= 2009–10 South Carolina Gamecocks women's basketball team =

Intercollegiate basketball season

2009–10 South Carolina Gamecocks women's basketball
- Conference: Southeast Conference
- Record: 14–15 (7–9 SEC)
- Head coach: Dawn Staley (2nd season)
- Assistant coaches: Lisa Boyer; Carla McGhee; Nikki McCray
- Home arena: Colonial Life Arena

2009–10 SEC women's basketball standings
	Conf.				Overall
Team	W		L	PCT	W		L	PCT
No. 3 Tennessee^{†}	15	–	1	.938	32	–	3	.914
No. 19 Kentucky	11	–	5	.688	28	–	8	.778
Mississippi State	9	–	7	.563	21	–	13	.618
No. 21 LSU	9	–	7	.563	21	–	10	.677
Vanderbilt	9	–	7	.563	23	–	11	.676
No. 23 Georgia	9	–	7	.563	25	–	9	.735
Florida	7	–	9	.438	15	–	17	.469
South Carolina	7	–	9	.438	14	–	15	.483
Ole Miss	7	–	9	.438	17	–	15	.531
Auburn	5	–	11	.313	15	–	16	.484
Alabama	4	–	12	.250	12	–	18	.400
Arkansas	4	–	12	.250	12	–	18	.400
† 2010 SEC tournament winner Rankings from AP poll

The 2009–10 South Carolina Gamecocks women's basketball team represented the University of South Carolina in the 2009–10 NCAA Division I women's basketball season. The Gamecocks were coached by Dawn Staley, in her second year, and played their home games at Colonial Life Arena. They competed as members of the Southeastern Conference.

Gamecock freshman and future WNBA player Kelsey Bone became the first South Carolina player to be named SEC Newcomer of the Year, before then transferring to Texas A&M.

South Carolina finished the season with a final record of 14–15. They lost to Ole Miss in the SEC Tournament and were not invited to the NCAA Tournament. This remains South Carolina's last season with a losing record.

== Offseason ==
- May 4: It was announced that the Gamecocks would participate in the 2009 US Virgin Islands Paradise Jam at the University of the Virgin Islands. The event was celebrating its tenth anniversary. Games were played at the U.V.I. Sports and Fitness Center, a basketball facility located in Charlotte Amalie, St. Thomas.
- May 15: The South Carolina women's basketball 2009 recruiting class was ranked the fourth-best in the nation by All-Star Girls Report. The Gamecocks added four players for the 2009–10 season, including Kelsey Bone and Ieasia Walker who were named ESPNrise.com All-Americans this week. Only Baylor, North Carolina and California signed better classes than the Gamecocks, according to the organization's rankings.
- May 16: Gamecocks basketball coach Dawn Staley returned to her alma mater, the University of Virginia, to give the valedictory address.
- May 17: Gamecocks signee Kelsey Bone was named one of 14 finalists for the 2009 USA Women's U19 World Championship Team.
- May 22: Dawn Staley announced that Ebony Wilson (Newark, N.J./Rend Lake College/Malcolm X Shabazz) signed a National Letter of Intent to attend the University of South Carolina and play basketball for the Gamecocks, with three years of eligibility beginning with the 2009–10 academic year.

== Schedule ==
Date time, TV	Opponent	Result	Record	Site city, state
Regular season
November 16, 2009*	at Charlotte	W 70–66	1–0	Dale F. Halton Arena; Charlotte, North Carolina
November 19, 2009*	at Clemson; Rivalry	L 92–94	1–1	Littlejohn Coliseum; Clemson, South Carolina
November 22, 2009*	Penn State	W 63–56	2–1	Colonial Life Arena; Columbia, South Carolina
November 26, 2009*	No. 20 Oklahoma; 2009 US Virgin Islands Paradise Jam	L 67–75	2–2	Sports and Fitness Center; Charlotte Amalie, U.S. Virgin Islands
November 27, 2009*	No. 5 Notre Dame; 2009 US Virgin Islands Paradise Jam	L 55–78	2–3	Sports and Fitness Center; Charlotte Amalie, U.S. Virgin Islands
November 28, 2009*	No. 23 San Diego; 2009 US Virgin Islands Paradise Jam	W 58–55	3–3	Sports and Fitness Center; Charlotte Amalie, U.S. Virgin Islands
December 2, 2009*	High Point	W 70–52	4–3	Colonial Life Arena; Columbia, South Carolina
December 13, 2009*	NC State	W 74–71	5–3	Colonial Life Arena; Columbia, South Carolina
December 17, 2009*	Wake Forest	W 62–52	6–3	Colonial Life Arena; Columbia, South Carolina
December 20, 2009*	No. 9 North Carolina; Carolinas Challenge	L 85–93	6–4	Myrtle Beach Convention Center; Myrtle Beach, South Carolina
December 28, 2009*	Boston University; Saint Joseph’s Tournament	L 67–68	6–5	Hagan Arena; Philadelphia, Pennsylvania
December 29, 2009*	Brown; Saint Joseph’s Tournament	W 73–46	7–5	Hagan Arena; Philadelphia, Pennsylvania
January 3, 2010	No. 11 Louisiana State	L 58–70	7–6	Colonial Life Arena; Columbia, South Carolina
January 7, 2010	at No. 4 Tennessee	L 62–79	7–7	Thompson–Boling Arena; Knoxville, Tennessee
January 10, 2010	at Alabama	W 80–68	8–7	Coleman Coliseum; Tuscaloosa, Alabama
January 14, 2010	Kentucky	W 79–71	9–7	Colonial Life Arena; Columbia, South Carolina
January 17, 2010	Auburn	W 63–49	10–7	Colonial Life Arena; Columbia, South Carolina
January 21, 2010	at No. 18 Louisiana State	L 52–69	10–8	Pete Maravich Assembly Center; Baton Rouge, Louisiana
January 24, 2010	at Florida	L 56–59	10–9	O'Connell Center; Gainesville, Florida
January 28, 2010	Ole Miss	W 64–50	11–9	Colonial Life Arena; Columbia, South Carolina
January 31, 2010	No. 5 Tennessee	L 55–60	11–10	Colonial Life Arena; Columbia, South Carolina
February 4, 2010	at Auburn	W 61–58	12–10	Beard–Eaves–Memorial Coliseum; Auburn, Alabama
February 7, 2010	at No. 14 Georgia	W 52–42	13–10	Stegeman Coliseum; Athens, Georgia
February 11, 2010	Mississippi State	L 53–55	13–11	Colonial Life Arena; Columbia, South Carolina
February 14, 2010	Arkansas	L 68–72	13–12	Colonial Life Arena; Columbia, South Carolina
February 21, 2010	at No. 16 Kentucky	L 50–71	13–13	Memorial Coliseum; Lexington, Kentucky
February 25, 2010	No. 24 Georgia	L 49–65	13–14	Colonial Life Arena; Columbia, South Carolina
February 28, 2010	at Vanderbilt	W 73–70	14–14	Memorial Gymnasium; Nashville, Tennessee
SEC Tournament
March 4, 2010	Ole Miss	L 63–64	14–15	The Arena at Gwinnett Center; Duluth, Georgia
*Non-conference game. ^{#}Rankings from AP Poll. (#) Tournament seedings in parentheses. All times are in Eastern Time.

== Roster ==
From the 2008–09 roster, 57.3% of minutes played and 50.8% of scoring returned.

Number	Name	Height	Position	Class
1	Ebony Wilson	5'8"	Guard	Sophomore
3	Lauren Falohun	5'9"	Guard	Junior
4	Samone Kennedy	5'4"	Guard	Junior
5	Kelsey Bone	6'5"	Center	Freshman

== Player stats ==
Player	Games played	Minutes	Field goals	Three pointers	Free throws	Rebounds	Assists	Blocks	Steals	Points

== See also ==
- 2009–10 NCAA Division I women's basketball season
- 2009–10 South Carolina Gamecocks men's basketball team
- 2009 South Carolina Gamecocks football team
