= 2009–10 Georgia Lady Bulldogs basketball team =

Intercollegiate basketball season

2009–10 Georgia Lady Bulldogs basketball

Lady Eagle Thanksgiving Classic champions

NCAA tournament, Sweet Sixteen
- Conference: Southeastern Conference
- Record: 25–9 (9–7 SEC)
- Head coach: Andy Landers (31st season)
- Assistant coach: La'Keshia Frett (5th season)
- Home arena: Stegeman Coliseum

2009–10 SEC women's basketball standings
	Conf.				Overall
Team	W		L	PCT	W		L	PCT
No. 3 Tennessee^{†}	15	–	1	.938	32	–	3	.914
No. 19 Kentucky	11	–	5	.688	28	–	8	.778
Mississippi State	9	–	7	.563	21	–	13	.618
No. 21 LSU	9	–	7	.563	21	–	10	.677
Vanderbilt	9	–	7	.563	23	–	11	.676
No. 23 Georgia	9	–	7	.563	25	–	9	.735
Florida	7	–	9	.438	15	–	17	.469
South Carolina	7	–	9	.438	14	–	15	.483
Ole Miss	7	–	9	.438	17	–	15	.531
Auburn	5	–	11	.313	15	–	16	.484
Alabama	4	–	12	.250	12	–	18	.400
Arkansas	4	–	12	.250	12	–	18	.400
† 2010 SEC tournament winner Rankings from AP poll

The 2009–10 Georgia Lady Bulldogs basketball team represented the University of Georgia in the 2009–10 NCAA Division I basketball season. The Lady Bulldogs compete in the Southeastern Conference.

== Offseason ==
- July 1: Rutgers will play in the eighth annual Jimmy V Women’s Classic when the Scarlet Knights host Florida on Dec. 7. This marks the fourth straight season the Scarlet Knights will take part in the game. They beat Georgia 45–34 last season. The games are part of the fundraising effort for the V Foundation for Cancer Research, which is named for the late Jim Valvano, who led North Carolina State to the national championship in 1983.
- July 11: The U.S. National Team, including Georgia guard Ashley Houts, rolled to an 81–64 victory over the Russian Federation in the gold medal game of the World University Games.
- July 17: Andy Landers, the first and still only full-time women's basketball head coach in the University of Georgia's history, has signed a three-year contract extension, Director of Athletics Damon Evans announced on Friday. The agreement adds to the two remaining years on Landers' existing contract and now extends through the 2013–14 season.
- July 25: Former Georgia Lady Bulldog Teresa Edwards headlines the list of the inductees included in the Women's Basketball Hall of Fame's Class of 2010. The group was announced Saturday in conjunction with the WNBA All-Star Game.
- July 30: The Women's Basketball Coaches Association (WBCA), on behalf of the Wade Coalition, announced the 2009–2010 preseason "Wade Watch" list for The State Farm Wade Trophy Division I Player of the Year. Georgia’s Ashley Houts has been named to the 2009–10 preseason "Wade Watch" list, which is made up of top NCAA Division I student-athletes who best embody the spirit of Lily Margaret Wade. This is based on the following criteria: game and season statistics, leadership, character, effect on their team and overall playing ability.
- August 21: The 2009–10 preseason candidates list for the Women’s Wooden Award was released, naming 31 student athletes. Ashley Houts from Georgia was one of the candidates.

== Regular season ==
=== Roster ===
Number	Name	Height	Position	Class
3	Anne Marie Armstrong	6–3	Guard	Freshman
12	Jasmine Hassell	6–2	Forward	Freshman
1	Ashley Houts	5–6	Guard	Senior
10	Jasmine James	5–9	Guard	Freshman
2	Ebony Jones	6–2	Forward	Freshman
22	Christy Marshall	6–1	Guard	Senior
11	Meredith Mitchell	6–1	Guard	Sophomore
21	Porsha Phillips	6–2	Forward	Junior
15	Jaleesa Rhoden	5–8	Guard	Junior
33	Angel Robinson	6–5	Forward	Senior
30	Candace Williams	5–8	Guard	Freshman
23	Tamika Willis	6–2	Forward	Freshman

=== Schedule ===
Date	Location	Opponent	Score	Leading Score	Record
Nov. 8	Athens, GA	Clayton State	80–49		Exhibition
Nov. 15	Athens, GA	No. 20 Oklahoma	62–51	Phillips (15)	1–0
Nov. 19	Chattanooga, TN	Chattanooga	74–57		2–0
Nov. 22	Athens, GA	Rutgers	49–48	Houts (17)	3–0
Nov. 25	Athens, GA	Alabama State	75–48	James (17)	4–0
Nov. 27	Hattiesburg, MS	Texas A&M – Corpus Christi	77–58	James (18)	5–0
Nov. 28	Hattiesburg, MS	Southern Miss	84–55	James (24)	6–0
Dec. 1	Athens, GA	UAB	71–42		7–0
Dec. 6	Athens, GA	No. 23 Georgia Tech	56–50		8–0
Dec. 8	Athens, GA	Tennessee State	71–50		9–0
Dec. 20	Athens, GA	No. 19 Virginia	63–59	James (17)	10–0
Dec. 22	Athens, GA	Detroit	66–42	Houts (12)	11–0
Dec. 28	Clemson, SC	Clemson	59–47	Robinson (12)	12–0
Dec. 30	Savannah, GA	Savannah State	80–45		13–0
Jan. 3	Tuscaloosa, AL	Alabama	52–44	Houts (14)	14–0
Jan. 7	Athens, GA	Kentucky	61–60 (OT)	Houts (27)	15–0
Jan. 10	Athens, GA	Florida	61–52	James (17)	16–0
Jan. 14	Nashville, TN	Vanderbilt	44–66	James (10)	16–1
Jan. 17	Fayetteville, AR	Arkansas	73–63	Houts (16)	17–1
Jan. 21	Athens, GA	No. 3 Tennessee	53–50	Houts (12)	18–1
Jan. 24	Athens, GA	Ole Miss	65–66	Houts (13)	18–2
Jan. 28	Starkville, MS	Mississippi State	66–74		18–3
Jan. 31	Auburn, AL	Auburn	53–67	James (13)	18–4
Feb. 4	Athens, GA	No. 19 LSU	49–46 (OT)	James (15)	19–4
Feb. 7	Athens, GA	South Carolina	42–52	James (11)	19–5
Feb. 11	Lexington, KY	No. 17 Kentucky	48–64	Hassell (9)	19–6
Feb. 14	Athens, GA	Alabama	76–47	Houts (24)	20–6
Feb. 21	Gainesville, FL	Florida	57–64	Phillips (14)	20–7
Feb. 25	Columbia, SC	South Carolina	65–49	Houts (21)	21–7
Feb. 28	Athens, GA	Arkansas	69–48	Houts (15)	22–7

== Player stats ==
Player	Games played	Minutes	Field goals	Three pointers	Free throws	Rebounds	Assists	Blocks	Steals	Points
Houts	34	1,201	134	39	115	109	127	1	69	422
James	34	1,222	130	46	85	173	101	3	60	391
Phillips	34	975	112	4	67	279	31	53	45	295
Mitchell	34	1,096	102	34	51	183	61	28	49	289
Robinson	30	771	78	3	69	228	20	61	17	228
Hassell	34	488	84	0	43	96	7	11	8	211
Armstrong	34	477	71	23	12	84	23	21	18	177
Williams	26	228	16	15	5	19	11	0	4	52
Rhoden	30	279	10	6	0	31	15	0	9	26
Jones	16	89	7	0	4	13	1	5	3	18
Willis	13	49	8	0	1	16	2	4	1	17

== Postseason ==
=== SEC women's basketball tournament ===
Date	Location	Opponent	Score	Leading Score	Record
Mar. 4	Duluth, GA	(11) Alabama (SEC Tournament first round	73–66		23–7
Mar. 5	Duluth, GA	(3) Mississippi State (SEC Tournament quarterfinals)	52–67		23–8

=== NCAA basketball tournament ===
Date	Location	Opponent	Score	Leading Score	Record
Mar. 20	Tempe, AZ	Tulane (first round)	64–59		24–8
Mar. 22	Tempe, AZ	Oklahoma State (second round)	74–71 (OT)		25–8
Mar. 27	Sacramento, CA	No. 2 Stanford (semifinals)	36–73		25–9

== Awards and honors ==
- Jasmine Hassell, All-SEC Freshman Team
- Jasmine James, All-SEC Freshman Team

== Team players drafted into the WNBA ==
Round	Pick	Player	WNBA club
2	16	Ashley Houts	New York Liberty
2	20	Angel Robinson	Los Angeles Sparks

== See also ==
- 2009–10 NCAA Division I women's basketball season
- 2009 Georgia Bulldogs football team
