= 2009–10 Maryland Terrapins women's basketball team =

Intercollegiate basketball season

2009–10 Maryland Terrapins women's basketball
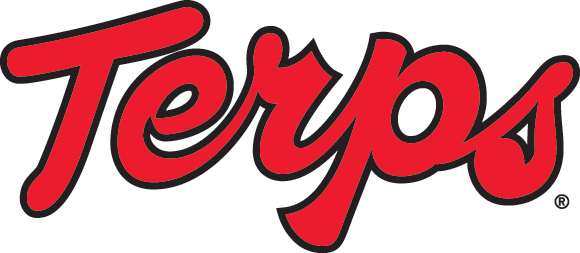

WNIT, third round
- Conference: Atlantic Coast Conference
- Record: 18–11 (5–9 Atlantic Coast)
- Head coach: Brenda Frese (8th season)
- Assistant coaches: Tina Langley; Marlin Chinn; David Adkins
- Home arena: Comcast Center

2009–10 ACC women's basketball standings
	Conf.				Overall
Team	W		L	PCT	W		L	PCT
Duke	12	–	2	.857	30	–	6	.833
Florida State	12	–	2	.857	29	–	6	.829
Virginia	9	–	5	.643	21	–	10	.677
Georgia Tech	8	–	6	.571	23	–	10	.697
North Carolina State	7	–	7	.500	20	–	14	.588
Wake Forest	7	–	7	.500	18	–	14	.563
North Carolina	6	–	8	.429	19	–	12	.613
Boston College	6	–	8	.429	17	–	15	.531
Maryland	5	–	9	.357	21	–	13	.618
Miami	4	–	10	.286	22	–	14	.611
Virginia Tech	4	–	10	.286	15	–	15	.500
Clemson	4	–	10	.286	13	–	18	.419
† 2010 ACC Tournament winner Rankings from AP Poll

The 2009–10 Maryland Terrapins women's basketball team represented the University of Maryland, College Park in the 2009–10 NCAA Division I women's basketball season. The Terps were coached by eighth year head coach Brenda Frese. The Terps are a member of the Atlantic Coast Conference.

== Offseason ==
- May 5: Maryland, 31-5 last season, will welcome a Big Ten team to College Park for the first time since hosting Ohio State in the 2007 Big Ten/ACC Challenge. The Terrapins upended the Buckeyes, 77-53, and followed that up with a road win at Purdue in the 2008 Challenge for a 2-0 record in the event. On December 3, the Terrapins will host the University of Minnesota.
- May 15: University of Maryland head coach Brenda Frese announced that assistant coach Erica Floyd has decided to step down from her post as assistant coach of the Terrapins women's basketball team and will pursue other opportunities outside of coaching in Louisiana.

== Regular season ==
- The Terrapins will compete in the Terrapin Classic on December 27 and 29.

=== Roster ===
Number	Name	Height	Position	Class
10	Anjale Barrett	5-10	G	Sophomore
31	Lori Bjork	5-11	G	Senior
21	Tianna Hawkins	6-3	F	Freshman
12	Lynetta Kizer	6-4	C	Sophomore
3	Jackie Nared	6-1	G	Redshirt Freshman
14	Yemi Oyefuwa	6-5	C	Sophomore
2	Dara Taylor	5-7	G	Freshman
24	Diandra Tchatchouang	6-3	F	Freshman
5	Essence Townsend	6-7	C	Freshman
33	Emery Wallace	6-1	F	Senior

=== Schedule ===
Date	Location	Opponent	Time	Score	Record
11/14/09	vs. North Carolina Central	College Park, Md.	TBA	88-39	1-0
11/16/09	vs. New Hampshire	College Park, Md.	7:00 p.m. ET	63-43	2-0
11/19/09	vs. Old Dominion	College Park, Md.	7:00 p.m. ET	84-67	3-0
11/22/09	at Mississippi State	Starkville, Miss.	3:00 p.m. ET	55-84	3-1
11/24/09	vs. Samford	College Park, Md.	7:00 p.m. ET	76-49	4-1
11/27/09	vs. Howard	College Park, Md.	7:00 p.m. ET	79-51	5-1
11/29/09	vs. Drexel	College Park, Md.	2:00 p.m. ET	82-65	6-1
12/03/09	vs. Minnesota	College Park, Md.	7:00 p.m. ET	66-45	7-1
12/06/09	vs. Loyola (Md)	College Park, Md.	2:00 p.m. ET	69-56	8-1
12/10/09	at Towson	Towson, Md.	7:00 p.m. ET	67-55	8-2
12/20/09	at American	Washington, D.C.	TBA	75-64	9-2
12/27/09	vs. Stony Brook	College Park, Md.	4:30 p.m. ET	76-44	10-2
12/29/09	vs. UNC-Wilmington	College Park, Md.	7:00 p.m. ET	67-61	11-2
01/03/10	vs. Saint Joseph's	College Park, Md.	2:00 p.m. ET	79-69	12-2
01/07/10	at North Carolina State *	Raleigh, N.C.	7:00 p.m. ET	73-45	12-3
01/11/10	at Virginia *	Charlottesville, Va.	7:30 p.m. ET	61-60	13-3
01/14/10	vs. Boston College	College Park, Md.	7:00 p.m. ET	72-65	14-3
01/17/10	at North Carolina *	Chapel Hill, N.C.	5:30 p.m. ET	75-64	14-4
01/21/10	vs. Miami *	College Park, Md.	7:00 p.m. ET	80-77	14-5
01/24/10	vs. Duke *	College Park, Md.	8:00 p.m. ET	58-57	14-6
01/28/10	at Virginia Tech *	Blacksburg, Va.	7:00 p.m. ET	60-44	15-6
01/31/10	at Longwood	Farmville, Va.	2:00 p.m. ET	85-40	16-6
02/05/10	vs. Georgia Tech *	College Park, Md.	8:30 p.m. ET	61-60	16-7
02/08/10	vs. Virginia *	College Park, Md.	7:00 p.m. ET	82-68	16-8
02/11/10	at Wake Forest *	Winston-Salem, N.C.	7:00 p.m. ET	70-65	17-8
02/14/10	vs. Clemson *	College Park, Md.	2:00 p.m. ET	71-51	18-8
02/21/10	at Duke *	Durham, N.C. 1:00 p.m. ET	TBA	71-59	18-9
02/25/10	at Boston College	Chestnut Hill, Mass.	7:00 p.m. ET	83-70	18-10
02/28/10	vs. Florida State	College Park, Md.	3:00 p.m. ET	94-61	18-11

== Atlantic Coast tournament ==
Date	Location	Opponent	Terps points	Opp. points	Time	Score	Record
03/04/10	at North Carolina (First Round)	Chapel Hill, N.C.	TBA	TBA	3:00 p.m. ET	83-77	19-11
03/05/10	at Duke (Second Round)	Durham, N.C.	TBA	TBA	3:00 p.m. ET	64-66	19-12

== Postseason ==
=== Women's National Invitational Tournament ===
The Terps were selected for the Women's NIT tournament, and fell to Providence College in the third round after defeating Iona College in round 1 and East Carolina University in round 2.

Date	Location	Opponent	Terps points	Opp. points	Time	Score	Record
03/19/10	Iona (First Round)	College Park, M.D.	TBA	TBA	7:00 p.m. ET	88-53	20-12
03/21/10	East Carolina (Second Round)	College Park, M.D.	TBA	TBA	12:00 p.m. ET	87-52	21-12
03/25/10	Providence (Third Round)	College Park, M.D.	TBA	TBA	7:00 p.m. ET	64-77	21-13

== Team players drafted into the WNBA ==
Round	Pick	Player	NBA club
1	6	Tianna Hawkins	Seattle Storm

== See also ==
- 2009–10 ACC women’s basketball season
- List of Atlantic Coast Conference women's basketball regular season champions
- List of Atlantic Coast Conference women's basketball tournament champions
