= 2009–10 Vanderbilt Commodores women's basketball team =

Intercollegiate basketball season

2009–10 Vanderbilt Commodores women's basketball

Vanderbilt Thanksgiving Tournament champions
- Conference: Southeastern Conference
- Record: 23–11 (9–7 SEC)
- Head coach: Melanie Balcomb
- Assistant coaches: Tom Garrick; Vicky Picott; Kim Rosamond
- Home arena: Memorial Gymnasium

2009–10 SEC women's basketball standings
	Conf.				Overall
Team	W		L	PCT	W		L	PCT
No. 3 Tennessee^{†}	15	–	1	.938	32	–	3	.914
No. 19 Kentucky	11	–	5	.688	28	–	8	.778
Mississippi State	9	–	7	.563	21	–	13	.618
No. 21 LSU	9	–	7	.563	21	–	10	.677
Vanderbilt	9	–	7	.563	23	–	11	.676
No. 23 Georgia	9	–	7	.563	25	–	9	.735
Florida	7	–	9	.438	15	–	17	.469
South Carolina	7	–	9	.438	14	–	15	.483
Ole Miss	7	–	9	.438	17	–	15	.531
Auburn	5	–	11	.313	15	–	16	.484
Alabama	4	–	12	.250	12	–	18	.400
Arkansas	4	–	12	.250	12	–	18	.400
† 2010 SEC tournament winner Rankings from AP poll

The 2009–10 Vanderbilt Commodores women's basketball team represented Vanderbilt University in the 2009–10 NCAA Division I basketball season. The Commodores were a member of the Southeastern Conference.

== Offseason ==
- April 23: The Commodores were honored with a joint resolution presented on the floor of the Tennessee House of Representatives which lauded the squad for its successful 2008–09 season. Representative Brenda Gilmore sponsored the resolution in the House after it was entered by Senator Douglas Henry.
- May 18, 2009: Former Vanderbilt women's basketball stars Christina Wirth and Jennifer Risper were adjusting to professional basketball. Wirth and Risper, now with the Indiana Fever and the Chicago Sky, helped one another move into their new respective homes this past week. After four years together with the Commodores, separating from each other and the rest of their teammates was an adjustment. Should they make the final rosters, they would meet three times during the regular season.
- On May 28, Ripser and Wirth played against each other. The Sky lost the game 74–67. In the loss, Risper appeared in 9 minutes, and had 3 free throws, 5 rebounds, 1 steal, and 3 points. Wirth played 10 minutes, had 2 free throws, 1 assist, and 1 steal, and scored 2 points.
- June 17, 2009: The Sommet Center in Nashville, Tennessee would host either the men's or women's SEC tournament in each of next four seasons. Nashville was previously revealed as the host of the 2010 men's tournament, and was awarded the 2011 and 2012 women's tournament, and the 2013 men's tournament.
- June 25: Jence Rhoads traveled to Austria, Italy and the Czech Republic as part of Athletes International, a non-profit organization that gives American athletes in over a dozen different sports a chance to play around the world.

== Preseason ==
Date	Location	Opponent	Score	Record
Oct 30	Nashville	Union (TN)	69–48	1–0
Nov 7	Nashville	Drury	79–54	2–0

== Regular season ==
- February 21: Jence Rhoads had 19 points as the Commodores beat Mississippi by a score of 68–59. It was the Commodores' first win in Oxford since 2003.

=== Roster ===
Number	Name	Height	Position	Class
11	Ashlee Bridge	5–11	Guard/forward	Senior
30	Elan Brown	6–0	Guard	Freshman
34	Tiffany Clarke	6–0	Forward	Freshman
12	Jordan Coleman	5–11	Forward	Sophomore
21	Stephanie Holzer	6–4	Center	Freshman
5	Lauren Lueders	5–8	Guard	Senior
23	Merideth Marsh	5–6	Guard	Senior
20	Jessica Mooney	5–8	Guard	Senior
4	Angela Puleo	5–9	Guard	Junior
22	Jence Rhoads	5–11	Guard	Junior
33	Rebecca Silinski	6–3	Forward	Junior
32	Gabby Smith	5–10	Guard	Freshman
15	Hannah Tuomi	6–1	Forward	Junior

=== Schedule ===
The Commodores participated in the Vanderbilt Thanksgiving Tournament (held from November 27–28)

Date	Location	Opponent	Score	Record
Nov. 15	Nashville	Lehigh	90–54	1–0
Nov. 18	Carbondale, Ill	Southern Illinois	90–64	2–0
Nov. 20	Nashville	UC Riverside	75–60	3–0
Nov. 24	Philadelphia	St. Joseph's	59–46	4–0
Nov. 27	Nashville	Austin Peay	95–51	5–0
Nov. 28	Nashville	North Carolina State	77–71	6–0
Dec. 2	Dayton	Wright State	63–46	

== Awards and honors ==
- Elan Brown, 2010 All-SEC Rookie Team
- Tiffany Clarke, 2010 All-SEC Rookie Team
- Merideth Marsh, 2010 Second Team All-SEC
- Jence Rhodes, 2010 First Team All-SEC

== See also ==
- 2009–10 NCAA Division I women's basketball season
- 2009 Vanderbilt Commodores football team
