= 2009–10 Boston College Eagles women's basketball team =

American college basketball season

2009–10 Boston College Eagles women's basketball

SMU Tournament champions
- Conference: Atlantic Coast Conference
- Head coach: Sylvia Crawley
- Assistant coaches: Stephanie Lawrence Yelton; Geoff Lanier; Angelita Forte

2009–10 ACC women's basketball standings
	Conf.				Overall
Team	W		L	PCT	W		L	PCT
Duke	12	–	2	.857	30	–	6	.833
Florida State	12	–	2	.857	29	–	6	.829
Virginia	9	–	5	.643	21	–	10	.677
Georgia Tech	8	–	6	.571	23	–	10	.697
North Carolina State	7	–	7	.500	20	–	14	.588
Wake Forest	7	–	7	.500	18	–	14	.563
North Carolina	6	–	8	.429	19	–	12	.613
Boston College	6	–	8	.429	17	–	15	.531
Maryland	5	–	9	.357	21	–	13	.618
Miami	4	–	10	.286	22	–	14	.611
Virginia Tech	4	–	10	.286	15	–	15	.500
Clemson	4	–	10	.286	13	–	18	.419
† 2010 ACC Tournament winner Rankings from AP Poll

The 2009–10 Boston College Eagles women's basketball team represented Boston College in the 2009–10 NCAA Division I women's basketball season. The team were coached by Sylvia Crawley. The Eagles were a member of the Atlantic Coast Conference.

== Offseason ==
- Aug. 20: Boston College center Carolyn Swords is one of 30 candidates named to the 2009-10 preseason Women's John R. Wooden Award.
- July 30: Carolyn Swords was named to the 2009-10 preseason "Wade Watch" list for the State Farm Wade Trophy Division I Player of the Year announced by the Women's Basketball Coaches Association (WBCA) .

== Regular season ==
=== Roster ===
Number	Name	Height	Position	Class
01	Ayla Brown	SR	Guard	6-0
05	Kelsey Reynolds	FR	Guard	5-9
10	Kerri Shields	FR	Guard	5-9
11	Jaclyn Thoman	JR	Guard	5-9
22	Brittanny Johnson	GS	Guard	5-8
23	Jasmine Gill	SO	Guard	6-1
24	Mary Nwachukwu	FR	Forward	6-2
30	Carolyn Swords	JR	Center	6-6
32	Stefanie Murphy	JR	Forward	6-4
33	Mickel Picco	SR	Guard	5-8

=== Schedule ===
The Eagles will compete in various tournaments. From November 27–28, the Eagles will participate in the SMU Tournament. On December 13, the Eagles will take part in the Maggie Dixon Classic. During the last week of December, the Eagles will take part in the San Diego Surf and Slam.

Date	Location	Opponent	Time	Score	Record
11/14/09	at Harvard	Cambridge, Mass.	6:00 p.m. ET	L 81–82	0–1
11/19/09	at Rutgers	Piscataway, NJ	7:30 p.m. ET	L 53–59	0–2
11/22/09	Vermont	Chestnut Hill, Mass.	2:00 p.m. ET	L 65–84	0–3
11/24/09	vs. Holy Cross	Chestnut Hill, Mass.	7:00 p.m. ET	W 90–57	1–3
11/27/09	vs. Fresno State	Dallas, TX	6:00 p.m. ET	W 83–75	2–3
11/28/09	at SMU	Dallas, TX	8:00 p.m. ET	W 69–68	3–3
12/02/09	at Iowa	Iowa	8:30 p.m. ET	W 72–67	4–3
12/05/09	vs. Monmouth N.J.	Chestnut Hill, Mass.	2:00 p.m. ET	W 75–49	5–3
12/10/09	vs. Michigan	Chestnut Hill, Mass.	7:00 p.m. ET	L 70–76	5–4
12/13/09	vs. Baylor	Madison Square Garden	1:00 p.m. ET	W 68–55	6–4
12/20/09	vs. Wright State	Chestnut Hill, Mass.	1:00 p.m. ET	W 62–56	7–4
12/28/09	vs. California	San Diego, CA	11:00 p.m. ET	W 81–69	8–4
12/30/09	at San Diego	San Diego, CA	8:15 p.m. ET	L 56–61	8–5
01/03/10	vs. Boston University	Chestnut Hill, Mass.	2:00 p.m. ET	W 69–61	9–5
01/07/10	vs. Dartmouth	Chestnut Hill, Mass.	7:00 p.m. ET	W 84–46	10–5
01/10/10	vs. North Carolina State	Chestnut Hill, Mass.	2:00 p.m. ET	W 83–66	11–5 (1–0)
01/14/10	at Maryland	College Park, MD	7:00 p.m. ET	L 65–72	11–6 (1–1)
01/17/10	vs. Georgia Tech	Chestnut Hill, Mass.	1:00 p.m. ET	W 77–51	12–6 (2–1)
01/21/10	vs. Virginia	Chestnut Hill, Mass.	7:00 p.m. ET	L 68–70	12–7 (2–2)
01/24/10	at Florida State	Tallahassee, FL	5:00 p.m. ET	L 64–85	12–8 (2–3)
01/29/10	at Clemson	Clemson, SC	6:30 p.m. ET	L 65–68	12–9 (2–4)
01/31/10	vs. Miami	Chestnut Hill, Mass.	2:00 p.m. ET	W 72–64	13–9 (3–4)
02/04/10	vs. Duke	Chestnut Hill, Mass.	7:00 p.m. ET	W 61–57	14–9 (4–4)
02/11/10	at North Carolina	Chapel Hill, NC	7:00 p.m. ET	W 69–62	15–9 (5–4)
02/14/10	vs. Wake Forest	Chestnut Hill, Mass.	2:00 p.m. ET	L 56–60	15–10 (5–5)
02/19/10	at North Carolina State	Raleigh, NC	6:30 p.m. ET	L 62–73	15–11 (5–6)
02/21/10	at Virginia Tech	Blacksburg, VA	2:00 p.m. ET	L 64–69	15–12 (5–7)
02/25/10	vs. Maryland	Chestnut Hill, Mass.	7:00 p.m. ET	W 83–70	16–12 (6–7)
02/28/10	at Miami	Coral Gables, FL	2:00 p.m. ET	L 68–76	16–13 (6–8)

== ACC tournament ==
Date	Opponent	Location	Time	Score	Record
03/04/10	vs. Virginia Tech	Greensboro, NC	6:00 p.m. ET	W 62–49	17–13
03/05/10	vs. Florida State	Greensboro, NC	6:00 p.m. ET	W 67–60	18–13
03/06/10	vs. North Carolina State	Greensboro, NC	3:30 p.m. ET	L 57–63	18–14

== See also ==
- 2009–10 ACC women’s basketball season
- 2009–10 NCAA Division I women's basketball season
- List of Atlantic Coast Conference women's basketball regular season champions
- List of Atlantic Coast Conference women's basketball tournament champions
