= 2009–10 Atlantic Coast Conference women's basketball season =

- League: NCAA Division I
- Sport: Basketball
- Teams: 11
- TV partner(s): ESPN, CBS

Regular Season

Tournament

Basketball seasons
- 08–09 10–11

2009–10 ACC women's basketball standings
	Conf.				Overall
Team	W		L	PCT	W		L	PCT
Duke	12	–	2	.857	30	–	6	.833
Florida State	12	–	2	.857	29	–	6	.829
Virginia	9	–	5	.643	21	–	10	.677
Georgia Tech	8	–	6	.571	23	–	10	.697
North Carolina State	7	–	7	.500	20	–	14	.588
Wake Forest	7	–	7	.500	18	–	14	.563
North Carolina	6	–	8	.429	19	–	12	.613
Boston College	6	–	8	.429	17	–	15	.531
Maryland	5	–	9	.357	21	–	13	.618
Miami	4	–	10	.286	22	–	14	.611
Virginia Tech	4	–	10	.286	15	–	15	.500
Clemson	4	–	10	.286	13	–	18	.419
† 2010 ACC Tournament winner Rankings from AP Poll

== Preseason ==
=== Wade Watch list ===
- On July 30, the Women's Basketball Coaches Association (WBCA), on behalf of the Wade Coalition, announced the 2009-2010 preseason "Wade Watch" list for The State Farm Wade Trophy Division I Player of the Year. The list includes three players from the ACC:
- Jessica Breland, North Carolina
- Jacinta Monroe, Florida State
- Monica Wright, Virginia

=== Big Ten/ACC Challenge ===
Date	Visiting Team	Home Team	Score	Leading Scorer	Attendance
Dec. 2/09	Georgia Tech	Penn State	G Tech 64-60	Tyra Grant, PSU (20)	TBD
Dec. 2/09	Illinois	Wake Forest	Illinois, 65-50	Jenna Smith, Illinois (27)	TBD
Dec. 2/09	Boston College	Iowa	BC, 72-67	Kamilee Wahlin, Iowa (23)	TBD
Dec. 3/09	Michigan	Virginia Tech	Mich, 71-51	Veronica Hicks, Michigan (19)	TBD
Dec. 3/09	Clemson	Northwestern	CLEM, 69-68	Kirstyn Wright, Clemson (22)	TBD
Dec. 3/09	Minnesota	Maryland	MD, 66-45	Kim Rodgers, Maryland (14)	TBD
Dec. 3/09	North Carolina	Michigan State	MSU, 72-66	Italee Lucas, North Carolina (29)	TBD
Dec. 3/09	Ohio State	Duke	Duke, 83-67	Jasmine Thomas, Duke (29)	TBD
Dec. 3/09	Purdue	Virginia	VA, 56-49	Brittany Rayburn, Purdue (19)	TBD
Dec. 3/09	Florida State	Indiana	FSU, 82-74	Jori Davis, Indiana (23)	TBD
Dec. 3/09	Wisconsin	NC State	Wisc, 53-48	Taylor Wurtz, Wisconsin (13)	TBD

== Regular season ==
=== Rankings ===
The rankings apply to the ESPN/USA Today poll.

- NR = Not ranked

AP Poll	Pre	Wk 1	Wk 2	Wk 3	Wk 4	Wk 5	Wk 6	Wk 7	Wk 8	Wk 9	Wk 10	Wk 11	Wk 12	Wk 13	Wk 14	Wk 15	Wk 16	Wk 17	Wk 18	Final^
Boston College	NR	NR	NR	NR																
Clemson	NR	NR	NR	NR																
Duke	6	12	12	8																
Florida State	15	9	9	6																
Georgia Tech	NR	NR	NR	NR																
Maryland	NR	NR	22	NR																
Miami	NR	NR	NR	NR																
North Carolina	5	4	4	10																
NC State	NR	NR	NR	NR																
Virginia	14	18	15	17																
Virginia Tech	NR	NR	NR	NR																
Wake Forest	NR	NR	NR	NR																

^Final Poll = ESPN/USA Today Coaches Poll
