= 2009–10 Miami Hurricanes women's basketball team =

Intercollegiate basketball season

2009–10 Miami Hurricanes women's basketball

UM Thanksgiving Tournament champions

WNIT, Runner-Up
- Conference: Atlantic Coast Conference
- Record: 22–14 (4–10 ACC)
- Head coach: Katie Meier
- Assistant coaches: Darrick Gibbs; Carolyn Kieger; Lonnette Hall

2009–10 ACC women's basketball standings
	Conf.				Overall
Team	W		L	PCT	W		L	PCT
Duke	12	–	2	.857	30	–	6	.833
Florida State	12	–	2	.857	29	–	6	.829
Virginia	9	–	5	.643	21	–	10	.677
Georgia Tech	8	–	6	.571	23	–	10	.697
North Carolina State	7	–	7	.500	20	–	14	.588
Wake Forest	7	–	7	.500	18	–	14	.563
North Carolina	6	–	8	.429	19	–	12	.613
Boston College	6	–	8	.429	17	–	15	.531
Maryland	5	–	9	.357	21	–	13	.618
Miami	4	–	10	.286	22	–	14	.611
Virginia Tech	4	–	10	.286	15	–	15	.500
Clemson	4	–	10	.286	13	–	18	.419
† 2010 ACC Tournament winner Rankings from AP Poll

The 2009–10 Miami Hurricanes women's basketball team represented the University of Miami in the 2009–2010 NCAA Division I basketball season. The team was coached by Katie Meier. The Hurricanes are a member of the Atlantic Coast Conference and attempted to win an NCAA championship.

== Offseason ==
- April 16: Head coach Katie Meier has announced that Shanel Williams has signed a National Letter of Intent to play for the Hurricanes beginning in the 2009-10 season. Williams is a native of Chesapeake, Virginia and led her Indian River High School team to an 89-20 record in her four-year career. The guard averaged 14.8 points per game her senior season.
- April 20: For the second consecutive season, an incoming University of Miami women's basketball player has been named to PARADE Magazine's Third-Team All-American squad. Morgan Stroman from Hopkins, South Carolina joined has joined the Hurricanes. Stroman is a 6-2 forward from Lower Richmond High School and has recently been named to the Sporting News Prep All-American Second-Team and earlier this month played in the 2009 McDonald's All-American game at the BankUnited Center. She ranks No. 8 nationally by the Blue Star report and No. 33 by HoopGurlz.com.
- April 27: The women's basketball team, along with the women's soccer and volleyball teams, paired up to contribute to the community on April 25 by participating in the Habitat for Humanity Project in the Liberty City section of northwest Miami. The players helped to build a home for a deserving family, a project that has stretched for two weeks.
- May 17: University of Miami women's basketball player, Shenise Johnson was one of 14 players that were named finalists for the USA Under-19 World Championship team. Johnson is the first Hurricane in program history that has been named a finalist for any USA Women's Basketball Team.

== Regular season ==
- The Hurricanes will compete in the UM Thanksgiving Tournament from November 27–28. From December 28–29, Miami will host the UM Holiday Tournament.

=== Schedule ===
Date	Location	Opponent	Score	Leading Scorer	Record
Nov. 7	Coral Gables, FL	Barry (Exhibition)	75–42		–
Nov. 13	Riverside, CA	UC Riverside	86–63		1–0
Nov. 15	Bakersfield, CA	Cal State Bakersfield	111–93		2–0
Nov. 18	Coral Gables, FL	Bethune-Cookman	88–46		3–0
Nov. 21	Birmingham, AL	UAB	70–54		4–0
Nov. 24	Coral Gables, FL	Houston	68–54		5–0
Nov. 27	Coral Gables, FL	Long Beach State	83–66		6–0
Nov. 28	Coral Gables, FL	Massachusetts	63–57		7–0
Dec. 5	Coral Gables, FL	Nebraska	71–76		7–1
Dec. 19	Binghamton, NY	Binghamton	68–52		8–1
Dec. 21	Ithaca, NY	Cornell	101–62		9–1
Dec. 28	Coral Gables, FL	Quinnipiac	93–48		10–1
Dec. 29	Coral Gables, FL	Texas	65–76		10–2
Dec. 31	Coral Gables, FL	North Florida	80–36		11–2
Jan. 3	Oxford, OH	Miami (OH)	75–61		12–2
Jan. 10	Coral Gables, FL	Florida State	78–70		13–2
Jan. 14	Coral Gables, FL	Duke	62–69		13–3
Jan. 17	Winston-Salem, NC	Wake Forest	64–67		13–4
Jan. 21	College Park, MD	Maryland	80–77		14–4
Jan. 24	Coral Gables, FL	Virginia Tech	69–73		14–5
Jan. 27	Atlanta, GA	Georgia Tech	73–80 (OT)		14–6
Jan. 31	Chestnut Hill, MA	Boston College	64–72		14–7
Feb. 4	Coral Gables, FL	North Carolina	80–69		15–7
Feb. 7	Coral Gables, FL	SIU Edwardsville	85–60		16–7
Feb. 11	Coral Gables, FL	Virginia	63–69 (OT)		16–8
Feb. 14	Raleigh, NC	NC State	64–66		16–9
Feb. 18	Clemson, SC	Clemson	72–73 (OT)		16–10
Feb. 21	Coral Gables, FL	Georgia Tech	73–77		16–11
Feb. 25	Tallahassee, FL	Florida State	62–87		16–12
Feb. 28	Coral Gables, FL	Boston College	76–68 (OT)		17–12

== Atlantic Coast Tournament ==
Date	Location	Opponent	Score	Leading Scorer	Record
Mar. 4	Greensboro, NC	Wake Forest	65–66 (OT)		17–13

== Postseason ==
=== Women's Invitation Tournament ===
Date	Location	Opponent	Score	Leading Scorer	Record
Mar. 18	Coral Gables, FL	Florida Gulf Coast (First Round)	70–57		18–13
Mar. 21	Coral Gables, FL	Florida (Second Round)	77–64		19–13
Mar. 25	Coral Gables, FL	North Carolina A&T (Third Round)	84–77		20–13
Mar. 28	Providence, RI	Providence (Quarterfinals)	73–65		21–13
Mar. 31	Ann Arbor, MI	Michigan (Semifinals)	76–59		22–13
Apr. 3	Berkeley, CA	California (Finals)	61–73		22–14

== See also ==
- 2009–10 ACC women’s basketball season
- List of Atlantic Coast Conference women's basketball regular season champions
- List of Atlantic Coast Conference women's basketball tournament champions
