= 2009–10 Tennessee Lady Volunteers basketball team =

Intercollegiate basketball season

2009–10 Tennessee Lady Volunteers basketball

SEC tournament champions SEC regular season champions State Farm Classic champions ESPN Classic champions

NCAA tournament, Sweet Sixteen
- Conference: Southeastern Conference

Ranking
- Coaches: No. 8
- AP: No. 3
- Record: 32–3 (15–1 SEC)
- Head coach: Pat Summitt (36th season)
- Assistant coaches: Holly Warlick; Dean Lockwood; Daedra Charles-Furlow
- Home arena: Thompson-Boling Arena

2009–10 SEC women's basketball standings
	Conf.				Overall
Team	W		L	PCT	W		L	PCT
No. 3 Tennessee^{†}	15	–	1	.938	32	–	3	.914
No. 19 Kentucky	11	–	5	.688	28	–	8	.778
Mississippi State	9	–	7	.563	21	–	13	.618
No. 21 LSU	9	–	7	.563	21	–	10	.677
Vanderbilt	9	–	7	.563	23	–	11	.676
No. 23 Georgia	9	–	7	.563	25	–	9	.735
Florida	7	–	9	.438	15	–	17	.469
South Carolina	7	–	9	.438	14	–	15	.483
Ole Miss	7	–	9	.438	17	–	15	.531
Auburn	5	–	11	.313	15	–	16	.484
Alabama	4	–	12	.250	12	–	18	.400
Arkansas	4	–	12	.250	12	–	18	.400
† 2010 SEC tournament winner Rankings from AP poll

The 2009–10 Tennessee Lady Volunteers basketball team represented the University of Tennessee in the 2009–10 NCAA Division I basketball season. The Lady Volunteers, coached since 1974 by Pat Summitt, played their home games at Thompson-Boling Arena in Knoxville, Tennessee. The Lady Vols, regular-season and tournament champions of the Southeastern Conference, were a #1 seed in the 2010 NCAA tournament, losing in the semifinals of the Memphis Regional to Baylor.

== Offseason ==
- April 3:Lady Vol basketball redshirt freshman center Kelley Cain had undergone successful knee surgery at UT Hospital.
- May 3: To celebrate Pat Summitt's 1,000th basketball victory, the University of Tennessee Athletic Department hosted "Pat Summitt's Day of 1,000 Stories" at the Tennessee Theatre in downtown Knoxville.
- May 7: Tennessee Lady Vol basketball signee Taber Spani, a 6–1 guard from Lee's Summit, Mo., received an invitation to participate in the USA U19 National Team trials.
- July 7: Pat Summitt and C. Vivian Stringer will oppose each other in the fourth annual Maggie Dixon Classic. The women's doubleheader will be played Dec. 13 at Madison Square Garden. The two Hall of Fame coaches teams will meet in regular season play for the seventh straight year. Baylor and freshman star Brittney Griner will face Boston College in the other contest. The two teams played once before at Madison Square Garden. Tennessee won 68–54 in 1999. Baylor will be making its first appearance at MSG.
- August 21: The 2009–10 preseason candidates list for the Women's Wooden Award was released and the list named 31 student athletes. Angie Bjorklund from Tennessee was one of the candidates.

== Schedule ==
Date time, TV	Rank^{#}	Opponent^{#}	Result	Record	Site (attendance) city, state
Exhibition
November 5*; 7:00 pm		Carson-Newman (Exhibition)	W 124–34		Thompson–Boling Arena (12,363); Knoxville, TN
November 7*; 7:00 pm		Delta State (Exhibition)	W 79–46		Thompson–Boling Arena (10,619); Knoxville, TN
Non-conference regular season
November 15*; 11:00 am, ESPN2	No. 6	No. 8 Baylor; State Farm Tip-Off Classic	W 74–65	1–0	Thompson–Boling Arena (12,824); Knoxville, TN
November 17*; 7:00 pm, ESPNU	No. 6	vs. Texas Tech; ESPN Classic	W 91–53	2–0	AT&T Center (4,586); San Antonio, TX
November 17*; 4:00 pm	No. 6	at No. 12 Virginia	W 77–63	3–0	John Paul Jones Arena (11,895); Charlottesville, VA
November 25*; 8:00 pm	No. 6	at Middle Tennessee	W 69–52	4–0	Murphy Center (11,802); Murfreesboro, TN
November 28*; 3:00 pm, SportSouth	No. 6	UCLA	W 61–47	5–0	Thompson–Boling Arena (14,176); Knoxville, TN
December 1*; 7:00 pm, SportSouth	No. 6	George Washington	W 93–53	6–0	Thompson–Boling Arena (12,840); Knoxville, TN
December 6*; 7:02 pm, ESPN2	No. 6	No. 17 Texas	W 78–58	7–0	Thompson–Boling Arena (13,434); Knoxville, TN
December 13*; 3:30 pm, ESPNU	No. 4	vs. Rutgers; Maggie Dixon Classic	W 68–54	8–0	Madison Square Garden (7,190); New York, NY
December 16*; 7:00 pm, SportSouth	No. 3	Louisville	W 86–56	9–0	Thompson–Boling Arena (11,084); Knoxville, TN
December 19*; 2:30 pm, FSN	No. 3	at No. 2 Stanford; Rivalry	L 52-67	9–1	Maples Pavilion (6,809); Stanford, CA
December 22*; 10:00 pm	No. 4	at San Francisco	W 89–34	10–1	War Memorial Gymnasium (3,255); San Francisco, CA
December 30*; 7:00 pm, SportSouth	No. 4	Old Dominion	W 102–62	11–1	Thompson–Boling Arena (12,503); Knoxville, TN
January 3*; 7:00 pm, ESPN2	No. 4	No. 14 Oklahoma	W 96–75	12–1	Thompson–Boling Arena (13,332); Knoxville, TN
SEC regular season
January 7; 7:00 pm, FSN/SportSouth	No. 4	South Carolina	W 79–62	13–1 (1–0)	Thompson–Boling Arena (11,462); Knoxville, TN
January 10; 2:00 pm, SEC Network	No. 4	at Mississippi State	W 75–48	14–1 (2–0)	Humphrey Coliseum (5,787); Starkville, MS
January 14; 7:00 pm, CSS	No. 4	at Florida	W 66–64	15–1 (3–0)	O'Connell Center (4,103); Gainesville, FL
January 17; 6:06 pm, ESPNU	No. 4	Vanderbilt; Rivalry	W 64–57	16–1 (4–0)	Thompson–Boling Arena (16,645); Knoxville, TN
January 21; 7:00 pm, FSN	No. 3	at No. 8 Georgia	L 50-53	16–2 (4–1)	Stegeman Coliseum (7,728); Athens, GA
January 24; 6:00 pm, ESPNU	No. 3	at No. 18 LSU	W 55–43	17–2 (5–1)	Pete Maravich Assembly Center (6,784); Baton Rouge, LA
January 28; 7:00 pm, CSS	No. 5	Auburn	W 85–56	18–2 (6–1)	Thompson–Boling Arena (12,353); Knoxville, TN
January 31; 2:00 pm, SEC Network	No. 5	at South Carolina	W 60–55	19–2 (7–1)	Colonial Life Arena (7,123); Columbia, SC
February 4; 7:00 pm, FSN	No. 5	Arkansas	W 74–57	20–2 (8–1)	Thompson–Boling Arena (11,817); Knoxville, TN
February 8; 9:00 pm	No. 5	at Vanderbilt; Rivalry	W 69–60	21–2 (9–1)	Memorial Gymnasium (6,005); Nashville, TN
February 11; 9:00 pm, CSS	No. 5	at Mississippi	W 61–58	22–2 (10–1)	Tad Smith Coliseum (2,356); Oxford, MS
February 14; 2:04 pm, SEC Network	No. 5	Florida	W 83–44	23–2 (11–1)	Thompson–Boling Arena (16,451); Knoxville, TN
February 18; 9:00 pm, CSS	No. 5	at Alabama	W 74–67	24–2 (12–1)	Coleman Coliseum (3,900); Tuscaloosa, AL
February 22; 7:02 pm, ESPN2	No. 4	No. 20 LSU	W 70–61	25–2 (13–1)	Thompson–Boling Arena (13,851); Knoxville, TN
February 25; 7:00 pm, FSN	No. 4	No. 16 Kentucky; Rivalry	W 81–65	26–2 (14–1)	Thompson–Boling Arena (12,100); Knoxville, TN
February 28; 6:00 pm, ESPNU	No. 4	Mississippi; Senior Day	W 75–63	27–2 (15–1)	Thompson–Boling Arena (14,289); Knoxville, TN
2010 SEC Tournament
March 5; 12 noon, FSN	No. 4	vs. Mississippi; 2010 SEC tournament Quarterfinal	W 76–51	28–2	Arena at Gwinnett Center (5,012); Duluth, GA
March 6; 3:30 pm, ESPNU	No. 4	vs. Vanderbilt; 2010 SEC Tournament Semifinal / Rivalry	W 68–49	29–2	Arena at Gwinnett Center (6,148); Duluth, GA
March 7; 6:30 pm, ESPN2	No. 4	vs. No. 19 Kentucky; 2010 SEC Tournament Final / Rivalry	W 70–62	30–2	Arena at Gwinnett Center (5,854); Duluth, GA
2010 NCAA Tournament
March 20; 12:16 pm, ESPN2	No. 3 (1)	vs. No. (16) Austin Peay; 2010 NCAA tournament, first round	W 75–42	31–2	Thompson–Boling Arena (10,922); Knoxville, TN
March 22; 7:06 pm, ESPN2	No. 3 (1)	vs. No. (8) Dayton; 2010 NCAA Tournament, second round	W 92–64	32–2	Thompson–Boling Arena (10,022); Knoxville, TN
March 28; 12:04 pm, ESPN2	No. 3 (1)	vs. No. 14 (4) Baylor; 2010 NCAA Tournament, Memphis Regional semifinals	L 62-77	32–3	FedExForum (TBC); Memphis, TN
*Non-conference game. ^{#}Rankings from AP Poll. (#) Tournament seedings in parentheses.

== Regular season ==
The Volunteers participated in the State Farm Tip Off Classic, which was held on November 15. Two days later, the Volunteers participated in the ESPN Classic.

=== Roster ===
Number	Name	Height	Position	Class

== Player stats ==
Player	Games played	Minutes	Field goals	Three pointers	Free throws	Rebounds	Assists	Blocks	Steals	Points

== Team players drafted into the WNBA ==
Round	Pick	Player	NBA club

== See also ==
- UConn–Tennessee rivalry
