= 2009–10 Wake Forest Demon Deacons women's basketball team =

Intercollegiate basketball season

2009–10 Wake Forest Demon Deacons women's basketball

WNIT, First Round
- Conference: Atlantic Coast Conference
- Record: 18–14 (7–7 ACC)
- Head coach: Mike Petersen
- Associate head coach: Natasha Adair
- Assistant coaches: Bob Clark; Candice Jackson

2009–10 ACC women's basketball standings
	Conf.				Overall
Team	W		L	PCT	W		L	PCT
Duke	12	–	2	.857	30	–	6	.833
Florida State	12	–	2	.857	29	–	6	.829
Virginia	9	–	5	.643	21	–	10	.677
Georgia Tech	8	–	6	.571	23	–	10	.697
North Carolina State	7	–	7	.500	20	–	14	.588
Wake Forest	7	–	7	.500	18	–	14	.563
North Carolina	6	–	8	.429	19	–	12	.613
Boston College	6	–	8	.429	17	–	15	.531
Maryland	5	–	9	.357	21	–	13	.618
Miami	4	–	10	.286	22	–	14	.611
Virginia Tech	4	–	10	.286	15	–	15	.500
Clemson	4	–	10	.286	13	–	18	.419
† 2010 ACC Tournament winner Rankings from AP Poll

The 2009–10 Wake Forest Demon Deacons women's basketball team represented Wake Forest University in the 2009–2010 NCAA Division I basketball season. The team was coached by Mike Petersen. The Demon Deacons were a member of the Atlantic Coast Conference, and attempted to win an NCAA championship.

== Offseason ==
- June 23: Jessie Cain traveled to Nicaragua with twelve other Wake Forest students as part of a study abroad experience that combined health care, communication and service.
- July 2: Candice Jackson was named assistant coach for the Wake Forest women's basketball team. She would specialize in work with the Demon Deacon guards in addition to assisting in recruiting efforts.

== Exhibition ==
Date	Location	Opponent	Time	Score	Record
November 9	Winston-Salem, NC	Mars Hill	7:00 PM	109–65	

== Regular season ==
=== Roster ===
Number	Name	Height	Position	Class
1	Thomas, Brooke	5-4	Guard	SO
3	Collier, Camille	5-6	Guard	JR
5	Morris, Courteney	5-11	Guard	SR
10	Roulhac, Tiffany	5-6	Guard	SR
11	Johnson, Patrice	5-10	Guard	RS FR
13	Cain, Jessie	6-2	Forward	SR
15	Wilson, Kem	5-10	Guard	JR
20	Waters, Brittany	6-1	Forward	JR
21	Garcia, Sandra	6-3	Forward	FR
22	Boykin, Lakevia	5-9	Guard	FR
23	Ray, Secily	5-11	Guard	SO
24	Williams, Asia	5-11	Guard	FR
25	Bryant, Jessica	6-4	Center	SR
33	Walker, Mykala	6-0	Guard	FR

=== Schedule ===
The Demon Deacons competed in the San Diego State Tournament from December 28–29.

Date	Location	Opponent	Time	Score	Record
11/13/09	vs. Jacksonville	Winston-Salem, N.C.	5:00 p.m. ET	64–47	1–0
11/18/09	vs. USF	Winston-Salem, N.C.	5:00 p.m. ET	62–45	2–0
11/21/09	at Miami (OH)	Oxford, Ohio	2:00 p.m. ET	78–42	3–0
11/23/09	vs. Coppin State	Winston-Salem, N.C.	7:00 p.m. ET	62–40	4–0
11/25/09	vs. High Point	Winston-Salem, N.C.	3:00 p.m. ET	76–52	5–0
11/29/09	vs. Presbyterian	Winston-Salem, N.C.	2:00 p.m. ET	66–25	6–0
12/02/09	vs. Illinois	Winston-Salem, N.C.	7:00 p.m. ET	50–65	6–1
12/05/09	at Georgetown	Washington, D.C.	1:00 p.m. ET	56–73	6–2
12/14/09	vs. North Florida	Winston-Salem, N.C.	11:30 a.m. ET	60–57	7–2
12/17/09	at South Carolina	Columbia, S.C.	7:00 p.m. ET	52–62	7–3
12/19/09	vs. Wofford	Winston-Salem, N.C.	2:00 p.m. ET	85–55	8–3
12/28/09	at San Diego State	San Diego, Calif.	5:00 p.m. PT	62–63	8–4
12/29/09	vs. Valparaiso	San Diego, Calif.	8:00 p.m. PT	52–34	9–4
01/04/10	vs. Richmond	Winston-Salem, N.C.	7:00 p.m. ET	54–64	9–5
01/07/10	vs. Virginia Tech	Winston-Salem, N.C.	7:00 p.m. ET	66–63	10–5 (1–0)
01/10/10	at Duke	Durham, N.C.	1:00 p.m. ET	51–65	10–6 (1–1)
01/14/10	at Georgia Tech	Atlanta, Ga.	7:00 p.m. ET	60–72	10–7 (1–2)
01/17/10	vs. Miami	Winston-Salem, N.C.	2:00 p.m. ET	67–64	11–7 (2–2)
01/22/10	at North Carolina State	Raleigh, N.C.	6:30 p.m. ET	49–51	11–8 (2–3)
01/24/10	vs. Clemson	Winston-Salem, N.C.	2:00 p.m. ET	63–43	12–8 (3–3)
01/31/10	vs. Virginia	Winston-Salem, N.C.	1:00 p.m. ET	64–57	13–8 (4–3)
02/05/10	at Virginia Tech	Blacksburg, Va.	4:00 p.m. ET	58–51	14–8 (5–3)
02/07/10	at Florida State	Tallahassee, Fla.	2:00 p.m. ET	38–83	14–9 (5–4)
02/11/10	vs. Maryland	Winston-Salem, N.C.	7:00 p.m. ET	65–70	14–10 (5–5)
02/14/10	at Boston College	Chestnut Hill, Mass.	2:00 p.m. ET	60–56	15–10 (6–5)
02/18/10	vs. North Carolina	Winston-Salem, N.C.	7:00 p.m. ET	59–65 OT	15–11 (6–6)
02/22/10	vs. North Carolina Central	Winston-Salem, N.C.	7:00 p.m. ET	76–63	16–11 (7–6)
02/25/10	vs. North Carolina State	Winston-Salem, N.C.	7:00 p.m. ET	66–50	17–11 (8–6)
02/28/10	at Clemson	Clemson, S.C.	2:00 p.m. ET	62–67	17–12 (8–7)

== ACC tournament ==
Date	Opponent	Location	Time	Score
03/04/10	vs. Miami (FL)	Greensboro, NC	11:00 a.m. ET	66–65 OT
03/05/10	vs. Georgia Tech	Greensboro, NC	11:00 a.m. ET	45–52

== WNIT ==
Date	Opponent	Location	Time	Score
03/18/10	vs. North Carolina A&T (First Round)	Winston-Salem, NC	7:00 p.m. ET	49–73

== See also ==
- 2009–10 ACC women's basketball season
- 2009–10 NCAA Division I women's basketball season
- List of Atlantic Coast Conference women's basketball regular season champions
- List of Atlantic Coast Conference women's basketball tournament champions
