= 2009–10 Duke Blue Devils women's basketball team =

Intercollegiate basketball season

2009–10 Duke Blue Devils women's basketball

Caribbean Challenge champions

NCAA tournament, Memphis Regional Final
- Conference: Atlantic Coast Conference
- Record: 30–6 (12–2 ACC)
- Head coach: Joanne P. McCallie
- Assistant coaches: Al Brown; Shannon Perry; Trisha Stafford-Odom

2009–10 ACC women's basketball standings
	Conf.				Overall
Team	W		L	PCT	W		L	PCT
Duke	12	–	2	.857	30	–	6	.833
Florida State	12	–	2	.857	29	–	6	.829
Virginia	9	–	5	.643	21	–	10	.677
Georgia Tech	8	–	6	.571	23	–	10	.697
North Carolina State	7	–	7	.500	20	–	14	.588
Wake Forest	7	–	7	.500	18	–	14	.563
North Carolina	6	–	8	.429	19	–	12	.613
Boston College	6	–	8	.429	17	–	15	.531
Maryland	5	–	9	.357	21	–	13	.618
Miami	4	–	10	.286	22	–	14	.611
Virginia Tech	4	–	10	.286	15	–	15	.500
Clemson	4	–	10	.286	13	–	18	.419
† 2010 ACC Tournament winner Rankings from AP Poll

The 2009–10 Duke Blue Devils women's basketball team represented Duke University in the 2009–10 NCAA Division I basketball season. The Blue Devils were coached by Joanne P. McCallie, (also known as Coach P) and the Blue Devils played their home games at Cameron Indoor Stadium in Durham, North Carolina. The Blue Devils are a member of the Atlantic Coast Conference.

== Offseason ==
- April 23, 2009: Duke University senior Carrem Gay has signed a training camp contract with the Connecticut Sun of the WNBA. Gay along with Kristi Cirone of Illinois State and Ashley Hayes of Murray State will get a chance to compete for a place on the club’s roster.
- May 5, 2009:

The Atlantic Coast Conference and the Big Ten Conference announced the pairings for the annual Big Ten/ACC Challenge for women’s basketball, which is in its third year of a four-year agreement. The 2009 Challenge would involve Ohio State playing Duke on December 3.

== Preseason ==
Date	Location	Opponent	Score	Record
Nov. 5, 2009	Durham, NC	Wingate	99–31	1–0
Nov. 8, 2009	Durham, NC	Alaska Anchorage	100–32	2–0

== Regular season ==
- The Blue Devils were victorious in the Caribbean Challenge. The Challenge was held in Cancun and was held from November 26–27, 2009.

=== Roster ===
Number	Name	Height	Position	Class
1	Chelsea Hopkins	5-8	Guard	Sophomore
3	Shay Selby	5-9	Guard	Sophomore
5	Jasmine Thomas	5-9	Guard	Junior
13	Karima Christmas	6-0	Guard/Forward	Junior
15	Bridgette Mitchell	6-0	Forward/Guard	Senior
21	Joy Cheek	6-1	Forward	Senior
24	Kathleen Scheer	6-2	Guard/Forward	Sophomore
31	Keturah Jackson	6-0	Guard/Forward	Senior
32	Alexis Rogers	6-1	Guard/Forward	Freshman
34	Krystal Thomas	6-4	Center	Junior
43	Allison Vererey	6-5	Center	Freshman

=== Schedule ===
Date	Location	Opponent	Score	Leading scorer	Record
Nov. 13, 2009	Houston, TX	Houston Baptist	104–35		1–0
Nov. 15, 2009	College Station, TX	Texas A&M	77–95		1–1
Nov. 19, 2009	Durham, NC	Georgia Southern	69–42		2–1
Nov. 23, 2009	Durham, NC	UNC Charlotte	57–44		3–1
Nov. 26, 2009	Cancun, Mexico	Western Kentucky	70–47		4–1
Nov. 27, 2009	Cancun, Mexico	Marquette	74–43		5–1
Dec. 3, 2009	Durham, NC	Ohio State	83–67		6–1
Dec. 6, 2009	Durham, NC	Southern California	78–72		7–1
Dec. 15, 2009	Palo Alto, CA	Stanford	55–71		7–2
Dec. 18, 2009	Durham, NC	James Madison	79–65		8–2
Dec. 21, 2009	Orono, ME	Maine	75–34		9–2
Dec. 28, 2009	Durham, NC	North Carolina Central	117–28		10–2
Dec. 31, 2009	Philadelphia, PA	Temple	70–62		11–2
Jan. 3, 2010	Durham, NC	Providence	88–63		12–2
Jan. 7, 2010	Clemson, SC	Clemson	67–41		13–2 (1–0)
Jan. 10, 2010	Durham, NC	Wake Forest	65–51		14–2 (2–0)
Jan. 14, 2010	Coral Gables, FL	Miami (FL)	69–62		15–2 (3–0)
Jan. 18, 2010	Durham, NC	Connecticut	48–81		15–3
Jan. 21, 2010	Durham, NC	Virginia Tech	69–38		16–3 (4–0)
Jan. 24, 2010	College Park, MD	Maryland	58–57		17–3 (5–0)
Jan. 29, 2010	Durham, NC	Florida State	73–43		18–3 (6–0)
Feb. 4, 2010	Chestnut Hill, MA	Boston College	57–61		18–4 (6–1)
Feb. 8, 2010	Durham, NC	North Carolina	79–51		19–4 (7–1)
Feb. 11, 2010	Durham, NC	N.C. State	70–39		20–4 (8–1)
Feb. 14, 2010	Charlottesville, VA	Virginia Tech	65–53		21–4 (9–1)
Feb. 19, 2010	Atlanta, GA	Georgia Tech	64–50		22–4 (10–1)
Feb. 21, 2010	Durham, NC	Maryland	71–59		23–4 (11–1)
Feb. 26, 2010	Durham, NC	Virginia	83–65		24–4 (12–1)
Feb. 28, 2010	Chapel Hill, NC	North Carolina	54–64		24–5 (12–2)

== Postseason ==
=== ACC Tournament ===
Date	Location	Opponent	Score	Leading scorer	Record
Mar 5. 2010	Durham, NC	Maryland (Quarterfinals)	66–64		25–5
Mar 6. 2010		Georgia Tech (Semifinals)	67–55		26–5
Mar 7. 2010		N.C. State (Championship Game)	70–60		27–5

=== NCAA basketball tournament ===
Date	Location	Opponent	Score	Leading scorer	Record
Mar 20. 2010	Durham, NC	Hampton (First Round)	72–37		28–5
Mar 22. 2010		LSU (Second Round)	60–52		29–5
Mar 27. 2010		San Diego State (Memphis Regional Semifinals)	66–58		30–5
Mar 29. 2010		Baylor (Memphis Regional Finals)	48–51		30–6

== Team players drafted into the WNBA ==
Round	Pick	Player	NBA club
3	35	Joy Cheek	Indiana Fever

== See also ==
- 2009–10 ACC women’s basketball season
- 2009–10 NCAA Division I women's basketball season
- List of Atlantic Coast Conference women's basketball regular season champions
- List of Atlantic Coast Conference women's basketball tournament champions
