= 2009–10 LSU Lady Tigers basketball team =

Intercollegiate basketball season

2009–10 LSU Lady Tigers basketball

NCAA tournament, Memphis Regional Second Round
- Conference: Southeastern Conference
- Record: 20-8 (9-7 SEC)
- Head coach: Van Chancellor
- Home arena: Pete Maravich Assembly Center

2009–10 SEC women's basketball standings
	Conf.				Overall
Team	W		L	PCT	W		L	PCT
No. 3 Tennessee^{†}	15	–	1	.938	32	–	3	.914
No. 19 Kentucky	11	–	5	.688	28	–	8	.778
Mississippi State	9	–	7	.563	21	–	13	.618
No. 21 LSU	9	–	7	.563	21	–	10	.677
Vanderbilt	9	–	7	.563	23	–	11	.676
No. 23 Georgia	9	–	7	.563	25	–	9	.735
Florida	7	–	9	.438	15	–	17	.469
South Carolina	7	–	9	.438	14	–	15	.483
Ole Miss	7	–	9	.438	17	–	15	.531
Auburn	5	–	11	.313	15	–	16	.484
Alabama	4	–	12	.250	12	–	18	.400
Arkansas	4	–	12	.250	12	–	18	.400
† 2010 SEC tournament winner Rankings from AP poll

The 2009–10 LSU Lady Tigers basketball team represented Louisiana State University in the 2009–10 NCAA Division I basketball season. The Lady Tigers were coached by Van Chancellor and were a member of the Southeastern Conference.

== Offseason ==
- May 6: LSU All-Southeastern Conference guard Allison Hightower is one of 29 student-athletes from across the country who have been invited to participate in the USA Basketball World University Games Team Trials.
- May 15: Former LSU women's basketball All-American Sylvia Fowles led a group of 48 student-athletes who received degrees
- May 17: LSU forward LaSondra Barrett was named one of 14 finalists for the 2009 USA Basketball Women’s U19 World Championship Team following the completion of a three-day training camp on Sunday afternoon at the U.S. Olympic Training Center.
- July 30: The Women's Basketball Coaches Association (WBCA), on behalf of the Wade Coalition, announced the 2009–10 preseason "Wade Watch" list for The State Farm Wade Trophy Division I Player of the Year. Louisiana State’s Allison Hightower has been named to the 2009-10 preseason "Wade Watch" list, which is made up of top NCAA Division I student-athletes who best embody the spirit of Lily Margaret Wade. This is based on the following criteria: game and season statistics, leadership, character, effect on their team and overall playing ability.
- August 21: The 2009–10 preseason candidates list for the Women’s Wooden Award was released, naming 31 student athletes. Allison Hightower from LSU was one of the candidates.

== Team players drafted into the WNBA ==
Round	Pick	Player	WNBA club
2	15	Allison Hightower	Connecticut Sun

== See also ==
- 2009–10 NCAA Division I women's basketball season
