= 2009–10 Florida State Seminoles women's basketball team =

Intercollegiate basketball season

2009–10 Florida State Seminoles women's basketball

ACC Regular Season Co-Champions Seminole Classic Champions

NCAA tournament, Elite Eight
- Conference: Atlantic Coast Conference

Ranking
- Coaches: No. 9
- AP: No. 11
- Record: 29–6 (12–2 ACC)
- Head coach: Sue Semrau
- Assistant coaches: Cori Close; Angie Johnson; Lance White
- Home arena: Donald L. Tucker Center

2009–10 ACC women's basketball standings
	Conf.				Overall
Team	W		L	PCT	W		L	PCT
Duke	12	–	2	.857	30	–	6	.833
Florida State	12	–	2	.857	29	–	6	.829
Virginia	9	–	5	.643	21	–	10	.677
Georgia Tech	8	–	6	.571	23	–	10	.697
North Carolina State	7	–	7	.500	20	–	14	.588
Wake Forest	7	–	7	.500	18	–	14	.563
North Carolina	6	–	8	.429	19	–	12	.613
Boston College	6	–	8	.429	17	–	15	.531
Maryland	5	–	9	.357	21	–	13	.618
Miami	4	–	10	.286	22	–	14	.611
Virginia Tech	4	–	10	.286	15	–	15	.500
Clemson	4	–	10	.286	13	–	18	.419
† 2010 ACC Tournament winner Rankings from AP Poll

The 2009–10 Florida State Seminoles women's basketball team represented Florida State University in the 2009–10 NCAA Division I women's basketball season. The Seminoles were coached by Sue Semrau. The Seminoles were a member of the Atlantic Coast Conference.

The Seminoles won their second consecutive regular season title and were selected as a three-seed in the NCAA tournament where they advanced to the semifinals for the first time in school history

== Offseason ==
- May 5:The Florida State women's basketball team will play at the Indiana University as part of the 2009 Big Ten/ACC Women's Basketball Challenge. The two squads will square off on Dec. 3, 2009.
- May 6:The 2009 USA Women's World University Games Team Trials roster was officially released Thursday and Florida State standout Jacinta Monroe is one of 29 players that are set to compete for one of 12 spots on the final roster.
- May 13:Florida State University women's basketball coach Sue Semrau and men's basketball coach Leonard Hamilton were recognized by the Florida State Senate on April 23 for their accomplishments.
- July 30: The Women's Basketball Coaches Association (WBCA), on behalf of the Wade Coalition, announced the 2009–2010 preseason "Wade Watch" list for The State Farm Wade Trophy Division I Player of the Year. Florida State’s Jacinta Monroe has been named to the 2009–10 preseason "Wade Watch" list, which is made up of top NCAA Division I student-athletes who best embody the spirit of Lily Margaret Wade. This is based on the following criteria: game and season statistics, leadership, character, effect on their team and overall playing ability.
- August 21: The 2009–10 preseason candidates list for the Women’s Wooden Award was released, naming 31 student athletes. Jacinta Monroe from Florida State was one of the candidates.

== Regular season ==
=== Roster ===
Number	Name	Height	Position	Class

=== Schedule ===
Date	Location	Opponent	Seminoles points	Opp. points	Record

== Player stats ==
Player	Games played	Minutes	Field goals	Three pointers	Free throws	Rebounds	Assists	Blocks	Steals	Points

== Team players drafted into the WNBA ==
Round	Pick	Player	NBA club
1	6	Jacinta Monroe	Washington Mystics

== See also ==
- 2009–10 ACC women’s basketball season
- List of Atlantic Coast Conference women's basketball regular season champions
- List of Atlantic Coast Conference women's basketball tournament champions
