= 2009–10 Georgia Tech Yellow Jackets women's basketball team =

Intercollegiate basketball season

2009–10 Georgia Tech Yellow Jackets women's basketball

LIU Thanksgiving Tournament champions
- Conference: Atlantic Coast Conference
- Record: 23–10 (8–6 ACC)
- Head coach: MaChelle Joseph
- Assistant coaches: Sytia Messer; Teri Moren; Gene Hill

2009–10 ACC women's basketball standings
	Conf.				Overall
Team	W		L	PCT	W		L	PCT
Duke	12	–	2	.857	30	–	6	.833
Florida State	12	–	2	.857	29	–	6	.829
Virginia	9	–	5	.643	21	–	10	.677
Georgia Tech	8	–	6	.571	23	–	10	.697
North Carolina State	7	–	7	.500	20	–	14	.588
Wake Forest	7	–	7	.500	18	–	14	.563
North Carolina	6	–	8	.429	19	–	12	.613
Boston College	6	–	8	.429	17	–	15	.531
Maryland	5	–	9	.357	21	–	13	.618
Miami	4	–	10	.286	22	–	14	.611
Virginia Tech	4	–	10	.286	15	–	15	.500
Clemson	4	–	10	.286	13	–	18	.419
† 2010 ACC Tournament winner Rankings from AP Poll

The 2009–10 Georgia Tech Yellow Jackets women's basketball team represented Georgia Tech in the 2009–10 NCAA Division I basketball season. The Jackets were coached by MaChelle Joseph. The Jackets were a member of the Atlantic Coast Conference.

== Offseason ==
- April 9: Georgia Tech broke ground Thursday on a 20,000-square-foot (1,900 m^{2}) basketball practice facility which will be called the Zelnak Center. The facility was spurred by a lead gift from Steve and Judy Zelnak, the facility will be built at a cost of $5 million and be open in time for the beginning of pre-season practice in October. Zelnak is chairman, president and chief executive officer of Martin Marietta Materials in Raleigh, N.C.
- April 28: In less than one week, the Georgia Tech women's basketball team will embark on an 11-day foreign tour to Tunisia and Paris. The Yellow Jackets will depart Saturday, May 2, and arrive in Tunisia the following day. The Jackets will spend the first six days of their trip in Port EL Kantaoui, Tunisia where they are scheduled to play an exhibition game against the Tunisian U-20 National Team and two games against the Tunisian National Team.
- May 4: The Yellow Jackets opened a 46-18 halftime lead on the U-20 Tunisian National Team. Deja Foster scored a team-high 10 points in the first 20 minutes. The final score was Georgia Tech 77-35. The Jackets finished with 25 steals. Some of the top Tech performances include:
  - Brigitte Ardossi: 16 points, 8 rebounds, 5 steals
  - Deja Foster: 12 points, 7 rebounds, 7 assists, five steals
  - Iasia Hemingway: 11 points, 3 rebounds, 3 steals
  - Sasha Goodlett: 9 points, 4 rebounds
  - LaQuananisha Adams: 7 points, 6 rebounds
- May 6: The Georgia Tech women's basketball team will take on Penn State in the third annual Big Ten/ACC Challenge. The Yellow Jackets and Nittany Lions will meet for the first time on Wednesday, December 2, 2009. The Jackets are 2-0 in the previous challenges with wins at Iowa and against Michigan State.
- May 6: In the second game against the Tunisian National Team, Tech would win the game 58-35. Mo Bennett led the team with eight points, 12 rebounds and seven steals. Iasia Hemingway scored 14 points and Deja Foster added 10 points and nine rebounds.
- May 7: Georgia Tech played the Tunisian National Team for a final time. At the end of the first quarter the game was tied at 12 and Tech would hold a 29-20 lead at the half. The second half was very competitive as Tunisia pulled within six points. A late 16-4 run by the Jackets sealed the 63-45 win and a perfect 3-0 record in Tunisia. Mo Bennett and Sasha Goodlett each scored 16 points and Brigitte Ardossi had seven points and nine rebounds in the game.

== Preseason WNIT ==
Date	Location	Opponent	Score
Nov. 13	Georgia Tech	Winthrop	63-30
Nov. 15	@ Oklahoma State	Oklahoma State	64-70
Nov. 21	Atlanta, GA	Florida Gulf Coast	58-48

== Regular season ==
- The Yellow Jackets competed in the Long Island University Thanksgiving Tournament from November 27–28.

=== Schedule ===
Date	Location	Opponent	Score	Record
Nov. 27	Brooklyn, NY	Seton Hall	57-51	1-0
Nov. 28	Brooklyn, NY	Long Island	73-56	2-0
Dec. 2	University Park, GA	Penn State	64-60	3-0
Dec. 6	Athens, GA	Georgia	50-56	3-1

== Team players drafted into the WNBA ==
Round	Pick	Player	WNBA club
2	21	Brigitte Ardossi	Atlanta Dream

== See also ==
- 2009–10 ACC women’s basketball season
- List of Atlantic Coast Conference women's basketball regular season champions
- List of Atlantic Coast Conference women's basketball tournament champions
