= 2010 SEC women's basketball tournament =

American college basketball postseason tournament

- Classification: Division I
- Season: 2009–10
- Teams: 12
- Site: Arena at Gwinnett Center; Duluth, GA
- Champions: Tennessee (14th title)
- Winning coach: Pat Summitt (14th title)
- MVP: Alyssia Brewer (Tennessee)
- Attendance: 27,894

2009–10 SEC women's basketball standings
	Conf.				Overall
Team	W		L	PCT	W		L	PCT
No. 3 Tennessee^{†}	15	–	1	.938	32	–	3	.914
No. 19 Kentucky	11	–	5	.688	28	–	8	.778
Mississippi State	9	–	7	.563	21	–	13	.618
No. 21 LSU	9	–	7	.563	21	–	10	.677
Vanderbilt	9	–	7	.563	23	–	11	.676
No. 23 Georgia	9	–	7	.563	25	–	9	.735
Florida	7	–	9	.438	15	–	17	.469
South Carolina	7	–	9	.438	14	–	15	.483
Ole Miss	7	–	9	.438	17	–	15	.531
Auburn	5	–	11	.313	15	–	16	.484
Alabama	4	–	12	.250	12	–	18	.400
Arkansas	4	–	12	.250	12	–	18	.400
† 2010 SEC tournament winner Rankings from AP poll

The 2010 SEC women's basketball tournament was the postseason women's basketball tournament for the Southeastern Conference (SEC) for the 2009–10 NCAA Division I women's basketball season and held at the Arena at Gwinnett Center in the Atlanta suburb of Duluth, Georgia from March 4 – 7, 2010. The winner of the tournament earned the SEC's automatic bid to the 2010 NCAA tournament. The first round and quarterfinals were televised by Fox Sports South, the semifinals were aired by ESPNU, and the final aired on ESPN2.

The regular-season champion, Tennessee, won the tournament and secured a #1 seed in the NCAA Tournament.

== Seeds ==
All SEC schools played in the tournament. Teams were seeded by 2009–10 SEC season record, with a tiebreaker system to seed teams with identical conference records. Unlike men's basketball play, SEC women's play is not conducted in a divisional format; all 12 teams are organized in a single table. The top four teams in the regular-season standings received byes.

Seed	School	Conference record	Overall record	Tiebreaker
1	Tennessee^{‡†}	15–1	32–3	
2	Kentucky^{†}	11–5	28–8	
3	Mississippi State^{†}	9–7	21–13	
4	LSU^{†}	9–7	21–10	
5	Vanderbilt	9–7	23–11	
6	Georgia	9–7	25–9	
7	Florida	7–9	15–17	
8	South Carolina	7–9	14–15	
9	Ole Miss	7–9	17–15	
10	Auburn	5–11	15–16	
‡ – SEC regular season champions, and tournament No. 1 seed. † – Received a bye in the conference tournament. Overall records include all games played in the SEC Tournament.

== Schedule ==
Session	Game	Time*	Matchup^{#}	Television	Attendance
First round - Thursday, March 4
1	1	12 noon	#9 Ole Miss vs. #8 South Carolina	Fox Sports South	2,385
1	2	2:30 pm	#10 Auburn vs. #7 Florida	Fox Sports South	2,385
2	3	6:30 pm	#12 Arkansas vs. #5 Vanderbilt	Fox Sports South	3,682
2	4	9:00 pm	#11 Alabama vs #6 Georgia	Fox Sports South	3,682
Quarterfinals - Friday, March 5
3	5	12 noon	#9 Ole Miss vs. #1 Tennessee	Fox Sports South	5,012
3	6	2:30 pm	#10 Auburn vs. #2 Kentucky	Fox Sports South	5,012
4	7	6:30 pm	#5 Vanderbilt vs. #4 LSU	Fox Sports South	4,813
4	8	9:00 pm	#6 Georgia vs. #3 Mississippi State	Fox Sports South	4,813
Semifinals - Saturday, March 6
5	9	3:30 pm	#1 Tennessee vs. #5 Vanderbilt	ESPNU	6,148
5	10	6:00 pm	#2 Kentucky vs. #3 Mississippi State	ESPNU	6,148
Championship Game - Sunday, March 7
6	11	6:30 pm	#1 Tennessee vs. #2 Kentucky	ESPN2	5,854
*Game Times in ET. #-Rankings denote tournament seeding.

== 2010 SEC tournament ==
First round March 4 FSN
9	Ole Miss	64
8	South Carolina	63
12	Arkansas	64
5	Vanderbilt	65
11	Alabama	66
6	Georgia	73
10	Auburn	74
7	Florida	61

Second round March 5 FSN
9	Ole Miss	51
1	Tennessee	76
5	Vanderbilt	63
4	LSU	61
6	Georgia	52
3	Mississippi State	67
10	Auburn	54
2	Kentucky	65

Semifinals; March 6 ESPNU
1	Tennessee	68
5	Vanderbilt	49
3	Mississippi State	65
2	Kentucky	76

SEC Championship Game; March 7 ESPN2
1	Tennessee	70
2	Kentucky	62
