= 2009–10 Kentucky Wildcats women's basketball team =

Intercollegiate basketball season

2009–10 Kentucky Wildcats women's basketball

2010 NCAA tournament, Elite Eight
- Conference: Southeastern Conference

Ranking
- Coaches: No. 16
- AP: No. 19
- Record: 28–8 (11–5 SEC)
- Head coach: Matthew Mitchell (3rd season)
- Assistant coaches: Kyra Elzy (2nd season); Matt Insell (2nd season); Shalon Pillow (1st season)
- Home arena: Memorial Coliseum (Capacity: 8,500)

2009–10 SEC women's basketball standings
	Conf.				Overall
Team	W		L	PCT	W		L	PCT
No. 3 Tennessee^{†}	15	–	1	.938	32	–	3	.914
No. 19 Kentucky	11	–	5	.688	28	–	8	.778
Mississippi State	9	–	7	.563	21	–	13	.618
No. 21 LSU	9	–	7	.563	21	–	10	.677
Vanderbilt	9	–	7	.563	23	–	11	.676
No. 23 Georgia	9	–	7	.563	25	–	9	.735
Florida	7	–	9	.438	15	–	17	.469
South Carolina	7	–	9	.438	14	–	15	.483
Ole Miss	7	–	9	.438	17	–	15	.531
Auburn	5	–	11	.313	15	–	16	.484
Alabama	4	–	12	.250	12	–	18	.400
Arkansas	4	–	12	.250	12	–	18	.400
† 2010 SEC tournament winner Rankings from AP poll

The 2009–10 Kentucky Wildcats women's basketball team represented the University of Kentucky in the 2009–10 NCAA Division I women's basketball season. The Wildcats, coached by Matthew Mitchell, were a member of the Southeastern Conference, and played their home games on campus at Memorial Coliseum—unlike UK's famous men's program, which plays off-campus at Rupp Arena in downtown Lexington.

The Wildcats had arguably the most successful season in the program's history, setting school records for most wins, most home wins, most conference wins, most consecutive conference wins, best start to a season, and highest finish in conference play. The season culminated in a deep run in the NCAA tournament that saw them appear in their first regional final since the inaugural NCAA tournament in 1982, when the then-Lady Kats lost in the Midwest Regional final to Louisiana Tech. This Wildcats team lost 88–68 to Oklahoma in the final of the Kansas City Regional.

== Preseason outlook ==
The Wildcats returned three starters from a team that had an injury-plagued 2008–09 season, finishing 16–16 and 5–9 in SEC play, ending in a second-round exit to Wisconsin in the WNIT. However, the team returned very little in the way of height—none of the returning players were taller than 6'1" (1.85 m).

The team received no respect from regional or national media prior to the 2009–10 season. The Cats were picked 11th of 12 teams in the conference by the media, and none of their players was named to either the first or second team on the media's preseason All-SEC team. The league's coaches gave no more respect to the team, also picking them 11th in the conference, but did name junior forward Victoria Dunlap to their preseason All-SEC second team.

The Wildcats were displeased at their preseason ranking; during the SEC's preseason media day, Dunlap told the assembled journalists,

We are not happy at all being picked 11th in the SEC. We actually printed out papers with '11' posted on and placed them in the locker room for motivation. We want to surprise a lot of people, win the SEC and get to the NCAA tournament.

== Exhibition ==
Date	Location	Opponent	Score
Nov. 7	Lexington, KY	Blue White Game	49–43
Nov. 9	Lexington, KY	Bellarmine	107–57

== 2009–10 roster ==
From the official UK women's basketball site:

#	Name	Height	Position	Class	Hometown	Previous Team(s)
Scholarship Players
1	A'dia Mathies	5'9"	G	Fr.	Louisville, KY, U.S.	Iroquois HS
3	Crystal Riley	5'5"	G	So.	Memphis, TN, U.S.	Hillcrest HS; LSU
4	Keyla Snowden	5'7"	G	So.	Lexington, KY, U.S.	Lexington Catholic HS; Akron
5	Carly Morrow	5'11"	G	Jr.	Chattanooga, TN, U.S.	Chattanooga Girls Preparatory School
10	Bernisha Pinkett	5'7"	G	Fr.	Washington, DC, U.S.	Howard D. Woodson HS
12	Lydia Watkins	6'1"	G-F	Sr.	Hopkinsville, KY, U.S.	Christian County HS
23	Rebecca Gray	5'10"	G	So.	Georgetown, KY, U.S.	Scott County HS; North Carolina
24	Amber Smith	5'6"	G	Jr.	Winter Haven, FL, U.S.	Winter Haven HS
25	Amani Franklin	5'11"	G	Sr.	Stone Mountain, GA, U.S.	Redan HS
30	Anna Cole	6'7"	C	Fr.	Mondovi, WI, U.S.	Mondovi HS
34	Victoria Dunlap	6'1"	F	Jr.	Nashville, TN, U.S.	Brentwood Academy
40	Brittany Henderson	6'2"	F	Fr.	Pasadena, CA, U.S.	John Muir HS

== 2009–10 schedule ==
Date time, TV	Rank^{#}	Opponent^{#}	Result	Record	Site (attendance) city, state
Exhibition
November 9*; 7:05 pm		Bellarmine	W 107–57		Memorial Coliseum (713); Lexington, KY
Non-conference regular season
November 13*; 11:00 am		Boston University	W 92–58	1–0	Memorial Coliseum (3,934); Lexington, KY
November 15*; 1:00 pm, Big Blue Sports Network/FSN		Butler	W 87–66	2–0	Memorial Coliseum (4,014); Lexington, KY
November 17*; 7:07 pm, Wazoo Sports		at Morehead State	W 72–55	3–0	Ellis Johnson Arena (2,012); Morehead, KY
November 22*; 6:00 pm		Chattanooga	W 65–55	4–0	Memorial Coliseum (4,301); Lexington, KY
November 25*; 3:00 pm		at UC Santa Barbara	W 68–54	5–0	The Thunderdome (1,244); Santa Barbara, CA
November 28*; 1:00 pm		McNeese State	W 85–50	6–0	Memorial Coliseum (4,140); Lexington, KY
December 1*; 7:00 pm		Miami (OH)	W 107–53	7–0	Memorial Coliseum (4,123); Lexington, KY
December 4*; 11:00 am		at Cincinnati	W 68–57	8–0	Fifth Third Arena (677); Cincinnati, OH
December 13*; 1:08 pm, Big Blue Sports Network/FSN		Florida A&M	W 91–39	9–0	Memorial Coliseum (4,608); Lexington, KY
December 20*; 1:08 pm, Big Blue Sports Network/FSN		Louisville; Battle for the Bluegrass/Pack the House	W 101–67	10–0	Memorial Coliseum (7,323); Lexington, KY
December 22*; 7:05 pm		UT-Martin	W 87–47	11–0	Memorial Coliseum (5,859); Lexington, KY
December 28*; 7:00 pm		Middle Tennessee	L 51–57	11–1	Murphy Center (4,811); Murfreesboro, TN
January 1*; 7:00 pm		Mississippi Valley State	W 93–48	12–1	Memorial Coliseum (5,921); Lexington, KY
SEC regular season
January 7; 7:00 pm		at No. 8 Georgia	L 60–61 ^{OT}	12–2 (0–1)	Stegeman Coliseum (3,134); Athens, GA
January 10; 1:08 pm, Big Blue Sports Network/FSN		No. 17 Vanderbilt	W 63–53	13–2 (1–1)	Memorial Coliseum (5,976); Lexington, KY
January 14; 7:00 pm		at South Carolina	L 71–79	13–3 (1–2)	Colonial Life Arena (2,341); Columbia, SC
January 17; 2:04 pm, SEC Network		Alabama	W 88–63	14–3 (2–2)	Memorial Coliseum (6,040); Lexington, KY
January 21; 7:00 pm		Arkansas	W 69–52	15–3 (3–2)	Memorial Coliseum (5,734); Lexington, KY
January 24; 2:04 pm, SEC Network		Auburn; Alumni Day & National Girls and Women in Sports Day	W 68–50	16–3 (4–2)	Memorial Coliseum (6,784); Lexington, KY
January 28; 8:00 pm		at No. 18 LSU	W 72–61	17–3 (5–2)	Pete Maravich Assembly Center (3,286); Baton Rouge, LA
January 31; 3:00 pm		at Mississippi State	W 69–59	18–3 (6–2)	Humphrey Coliseum (1,385); Starkville, MS
February 4; 7:08 pm, Big Blue Sports Network/FSN	No. 20	Mississippi	W 80–66	19–3 (7–2)	Memorial Coliseum (5,957); Lexington, KY
February 7; 3:00 pm	No. 20	at Arkansas	W 71–57	20–3 (8–2)	Bud Walton Arena (2,470); Fayetteville, AR
February 11; 7:05 pm, FSN	No. 17	No. 19 Georgia	W 64–48	21–3 (9–2)	Memorial Coliseum (6,521); Lexington, KY
February 14; 6:00 pm, ESPNU	No. 17	at Vanderbilt	L 55–68	21–4 (9–3)	Memorial Gymnasium (5,216); Nashville, TN
February 18; 7:00 pm	No. 16	Florida	W 77–51	22–4 (10–3)	Memorial Coliseum (6,638); Lexington, KY
February 21; 3:05 pm, Fox Sports South	No. 16	South Carolina; Senior Day	W 71–50	23–4 (11–3)	Memorial Coliseum (7,742); Lexington, KY
February 25; 7:00 pm, FSN	No. 16	at No. 4 Tennessee; Rivalry	L 65–81	23–5 (11–4)	Thompson-Boling Arena (12,100); Knoxville, TN
February 28; 3:00 pm	No. 16	at Auburn	L 53–65	23–6 (11–5)	Beard–Eaves–Memorial Coliseum (4,614); Auburn, AL
2010 SEC tournament
March 5; 2:30 pm, Fox Sports South	No. 19	vs. Auburn; Quarterfinal	W 65–54	24–6	Arena at Gwinnett Center (5,012); Duluth, GA
March 6; 9:00 pm, ESPNU	No. 19	vs. Mississippi State; Semifinal	W 76–65	25–6	Arena at Gwinnett Center (6,148); Duluth, GA
March 7; 6:30 pm, ESPN2	No. 19	vs. No. 4 Tennessee; Final / Rivalry	W 70–62	25–7	Arena at Gwinnett Center (5,854); Duluth, GA
2010 NCAA tournament
March 20; 2:30 pm, ESPN2	No. 19 (4)	vs. (13) Liberty; First round	W 83–77	26–7	Freedom Hall (3,560); Louisville, KY
March 22; 7:21 pm, ESPN2	No. 19 (4)	vs. No. 24 (5) Michigan State; Second Round	W 70–52	27–7	Freedom Hall (3,361); Louisville, KY
March 28; 9:30 pm, ESPN2	No. 19 (4)	vs. No. 4 (1) Nebraska; Regional semifinals/Sweet Sixteen	W 76–67	28–7	Sprint Center (5,907); Kansas City, MO
March 30; 9:07 pm, ESPN	No. 19 (4)	vs. No. 12 (3) Oklahoma; Regional final/Elite Eight	L 68–88	28–8	Sprint Center (4,423); Kansas City, MO
*Non-conference game. ^{#}Rankings from AP Poll. (#) Tournament seedings in parentheses. All times are in Eastern Time.

All attendance figures are from official box scores available at the official UK women's basketball site.

== Regular season notes ==
The regular season proved to be a season of milestones for the Wildcats, beginning with the best start in the program's history. UK's previous best start had been 9–0 in the 1980–81 season; they broke that record with a 101–67 pasting of Louisville on December 20 in which they forced a then school-record 38 turnovers. They reached 11–0 before their first loss at Middle Tennessee.

In SEC play, the Cats had never won more than four conference games in a row, with the last time being in 2005–06. They broke that record with a win at Mississippi State in which they also surpassed their SEC win total from 2008 to 2009. The Wildcats eventually stretched their record conference winning streak to eight.

With a win over South Carolina on February 21, 2010, the Wildcats completed an undefeated home season, the second in school history, and also set a school record for SEC wins in a season. However, they entered the SEC tournament on a down note, as they lost their final two regular-season games, both on the road.

The Wildcats' success has been heavily fueled by defense. Including their three SEC Tournament games, they have forced double-digit turnovers in every one of their 32 games, and have forced 20 or more in 24 of these games. As of the SEC final game, they were 4th nationally in turnover margin, averaging 7.59 more than their opposition. They were also in the top 25 nationally in scoring (73.9 per game), scoring margin (15.8), and steals (11.4).

== Postseason ==
=== SEC Tournament ===
With their second-place finish in the regular season, the Wildcats earned a first-round bye and also were bracketed away from regular-season champion Tennessee.

They began their SEC tournament on March 5 with a rematch of their regular-season finale against Auburn, who had beaten the Wildcats in Auburn five days earlier. The Cats' two leading scorers on the season, Victoria Dunlap and A'dia Mathies, respectively scored 24 and 15 points, and the team forced the Tigers into 20 turnovers as they won 65–54.

Next up for the Cats were third seed Mississippi State, whom they had beaten in their only previous meeting this season, also on the road. This time out, Kentucky started poorly, shooting less than 30% from the field in the first half and ending the first half down by 11. The deficit went up to 14 early in the second half before Mathies and fellow guard Amber Smith exploded, respectively scoring 18 and 11 in the half as the Cats shot 51.5% from the floor. The Lady Bulldogs were slowed in the second half by turnovers and foul trouble; all of their starters ended the game with four fouls. The Cats won 76–65, with Mathies leading the scoring with 25 points and Dunlap adding 22 to go with 9 rebounds, 5 blocks, and 5 steals. The result sent the Wildcats to the SEC title game for only the second time in the program's history, with the only other appearance coming in 1982. It also gave the Cats 25 wins on the season, tying the UK record set by their 1980–81 team.

The Wildcats then played their expected opponent, top seed and #4-ranked Tennessee, on March 7. The teams had a recent history, as the Lady Vols had clinched the SEC regular-season title on February 25 with an 81–65 home win over the Cats. This encounter, in front of a nominally neutral though mostly partisan Tennessee crowd, proved considerably closer. The Wildcats remained in contention for most of the game, even opening up a four-point lead early in the second half and tied at 50 with 10 minutes remaining. However, the Lady Vols then went on an 11–3 run and never looked back, winning 70–62. This was Tennessee's first sweep of the SEC regular-season and tournament titles since 2000.

=== NCAA basketball tournament ===
Kentucky was seeded #4 in the Kansas City Region of the 2010 NCAA Division I women's basketball tournament, their seventh appearance in that tournament. This marked Kentucky's first NCAA tournament appearance since 2006, and the Cats' highest seed since 1983.

The Wildcats' first-round game was against #13 seed Liberty at Freedom Hall in Louisville, Kentucky. The Lady Flames, making their 13th NCAA tournament appearance in the last 14 seasons, started strongly, scoring the first six points and taking a quick 8-point lead. The Cats then went on a 17–0 run to take back the lead, only to see the Lady Flames go on an 11–0 run of their own and take a 35–33 halftime lead. The second half was nearly as close, but Kentucky took the lead for good with 12 minutes left, and in the final 10 minutes Liberty could get no closer than the Wildcats' final 83–77 margin.

Kentucky was outrebounded 38–26 and outscored 54–30 in the paint. They made up for this with defense, forcing 22 turnovers, and free throws, outscoring the Lady Flames by 11 from the stripe. A'dia Mathies led the Cats with a career-high 32 points, which was also a record for a Kentucky player in NCAA tournament play. Victoria Dunlap and Keyla Snowden had 15 points each, with all of Snowden's scoring coming in the second half. The Cats' win was their 26th of the season, setting a new record for the program.

Next up for Kentucky in Freedom Hall was #5 seed Michigan State, in what was touted as a clash of styles between the undersized Cats and the bigger, though slightly slower, Spartans. The size mismatch was most obvious inside, where the 6'1" (1.85 m) Dunlap was matched against the 6'9" (2.06 m) Allyssa DeHaan. Dunlap was suffering from an upset stomach and was given an IV before the game, and also suffered a minor ankle injury in the first half. However, she apparently felt little effect, as she shot 9 for 13 from the field and led the Cats with 21 points and 8 rebounds.

The first half was largely a back-and-forth affair, with Kentucky taking a 35–31 halftime lead after holding Michigan State without a field goal for the last 6½ minutes. The Wildcats then went on a 24–6 run in the second half to take command of the game, ultimately winning 70–52. The Kentucky defense forced 18 turnovers and held the Spartans to under 35% shooting from the field, and also held the Spartans to their lowest point total in NCAA tournament play. The win sent Kentucky into the regional semifinals for the first time since 1982.

The victory earned the Cats a trip to Kansas City and a date with top seed Nebraska, another team having its best season ever. The Cornhuskers' only loss going into the game was in the semifinals of the Big 12 Tournament to Texas A&M, and they would have a partisan crowd on their side, as Kansas City is about a 3-hour drive from the school's campus.

This time, it was the Wildcats who took control of the game almost from the start, going on an early 12–4 run and stretching their lead to double digits late in the first half. They went into the locker room with a 43–34 lead, and then started the second half on an 11–1 run to take control of the game. While the Huskers made a late comeback while three Kentucky guards had four fouls, the Cats held on for a 76–67 upset win. Mathies led the Cats with 21 points, with Dunlap adding 18 plus 7 rebounds and Snowden scoring 13. While both teams had 16 turnovers, most of Kentucky's came late in the game. The Cats also outrebounded the bigger Huskers 36–25. The result sent Kentucky into its first regional final since 1982.

The regional final against Oklahoma opened as a repeat of the Nebraska game, with the Cats opening up a double-digit lead before the Sooners scored a basket and extending their lead to 17–4. However, Oklahoma quickly came back, taking its first lead with 7:41 left in the first half and going into halftime up 43–39. The second half belonged to the Sooners, who opened the half with a 15–5 run and later went on an 11–0 run to put the game out of reach, ultimately winning 88–68. The Wildcats shot only 23.1% from the floor in the second half, and were 2-for-17 from three-point range in the game. The only Wildcat to score in double figures was Dunlap, who had 31 points and 13 rebounds.

== Awards and honors ==
The conference's postseason awards announcement, made immediately after the end of the regular season, became a Kentucky coronation.

Matthew Mitchell, after leading the Cats to an all-time best of 11–5 in SEC play, was named the SEC Coach of the Year. He became only the second UK women's coach to win this award.

Victoria Dunlap became the first UK woman to be named SEC Player of the Year and the first to be named an Associated Press All-American. She was the only player in the conference to finish the regular season in the conference's top five in both scoring (17.2 per game) and rebounding (8.4 per game). Dunlap also led the SEC in steals and finished in the top 10 of four other SEC statistical categories. She was a unanimous selection to the All-SEC first team, becoming the first Wildcat to make the first team since Stacey Reed in 1993–94. Dunlap also made the SEC All-Defensive team, the AP All-America third team (the first woman from UK selected as an All-American by the AP), the United States Basketball Writers Association All-America team, and the State Farm Coaches' All-America team.

A'dia Mathies was named SEC Freshman of the Year, becoming the first UK woman to receive this honor. Second on the Wildcats to Dunlap in almost all key statistical categories, she was also named to the All-SEC second team.

The Wildcats became the first SEC women's team to sweep all three major conference honors (coach, player, and freshman of the year) since the unbeaten national champion 1997–98 Tennessee team; that team respectively claimed the top SEC honors with Pat Summitt, Chamique Holdsclaw, and Tamika Catchings.

== Class of 2010 commitments ==
On November 18, 2009, head coach Matthew Mitchell signed five high school players during the fall signing period, and received a Top-10 national ranking by two recruiting services. The class was ranked No. 5 by Blue Star Basketball and No. 10 by ESPN HoopGurlz. It marks the highest-ranking class for the Wildcats since 2006. The Class of 2010 signees are: McDonald's All-American Jennifer O'Neill, 2010 Gatorade Kentucky Player of the Year and Miss Kentucky Basketball Sarah Beth Barnette, 2010 Gatorade Connecticut Player of the Year Kastine Evans, Maegan Conwright, and LaQuinta Jefferson.
