= 2009–10 Auburn Tigers women's basketball team =

American college basketball season

2009–10 Auburn Tigers women's basketball
- Conference: Southeast Conference
- Head coach: Nell Fortner
- Assistant coaches: Kerry Cremeans; Mark Simons; Ayesha Whitfield

2009–10 SEC women's basketball standings
	Conf.				Overall
Team	W		L	PCT	W		L	PCT
No. 3 Tennessee^{†}	15	–	1	.938	32	–	3	.914
No. 19 Kentucky	11	–	5	.688	28	–	8	.778
Mississippi State	9	–	7	.563	21	–	13	.618
No. 21 LSU	9	–	7	.563	21	–	10	.677
Vanderbilt	9	–	7	.563	23	–	11	.676
No. 23 Georgia	9	–	7	.563	25	–	9	.735
Florida	7	–	9	.438	15	–	17	.469
South Carolina	7	–	9	.438	14	–	15	.483
Ole Miss	7	–	9	.438	17	–	15	.531
Auburn	5	–	11	.313	15	–	16	.484
Alabama	4	–	12	.250	12	–	18	.400
Arkansas	4	–	12	.250	12	–	18	.400
† 2010 SEC tournament winner Rankings from AP poll

The 2009–10 Auburn Tigers women's basketball team represented Auburn University in the 2009–10 NCAA Division I basketball season, coached by Nell Fortner. The Tigers were a member of the Southeast Conference.

== Offseason ==
- May 27:A trio of former Auburn women's basketball players squared off in WNBA preseason action with the Phoenix Mercury downing the Sacramento Monarchs, 74-70. DeWanna Bonner, the 2009 SEC Player of the Year and first-round draft pick of the Mercury, logged 19 minutes of action while picking up 10 points and a team-high six rebounds. Bonner also tallied two steals while making her WNBA preseason debut.

== See also ==
- 2009–10 NCAA Division I women's basketball season
