= 2009–10 Florida Gators women's basketball team =

Intercollegiate basketball season

2009–10 Florida Gators women's basketball
- Conference: Southeastern Conference
- Record: 15–17 (7–9 SEC)
- Head coach: Amanda Butler (3rd season)
- Assistant coach: Susie Gardner; Brenda Mock Kirkpatrick; David Lowery
- Home arena: Stephen C. O'Connell Center

2009–10 SEC women's basketball standings
	Conf.				Overall
Team	W		L	PCT	W		L	PCT
No. 3 Tennessee^{†}	15	–	1	.938	32	–	3	.914
No. 19 Kentucky	11	–	5	.688	28	–	8	.778
Mississippi State	9	–	7	.563	21	–	13	.618
No. 21 LSU	9	–	7	.563	21	–	10	.677
Vanderbilt	9	–	7	.563	23	–	11	.676
No. 23 Georgia	9	–	7	.563	25	–	9	.735
Florida	7	–	9	.438	15	–	17	.469
South Carolina	7	–	9	.438	14	–	15	.483
Ole Miss	7	–	9	.438	17	–	15	.531
Auburn	5	–	11	.313	15	–	16	.484
Alabama	4	–	12	.250	12	–	18	.400
Arkansas	4	–	12	.250	12	–	18	.400
† 2010 SEC tournament winner Rankings from AP poll

The 2009–10 Florida Gators women's basketball team represented the University of Florida in the sport of basketball during the 2009–10 women's college basketball season. The Gators competed in Division I of the National Collegiate Athletic Association (NCAA) and the Southeastern Conference (SEC). They were led by head coach Amanda Butler, and played their home games in the O'Connell Center on the university's Gainesville, Florida campus.

== Offseason ==
- June 8, 2009: Gators center Azania Stewart traveled to her native country of England, to try out for Great Britain’s Under-20 University World Games Team, which competed in Belgrade, July 1–12

== Regular season ==
=== Roster ===
Number	Name	Height	Position	Class
50	Ebonie Crawford	6–3	Center	Junior
33	Jordan Jones	5–9	Guard	Sophomore (RS)
21	Trumae Lucas	5–8	Guard	Sophomore
14	Ndidi Madu	6–1	Forward	Sophomore (RS)
22	Jennifer Mossor	5–9	Guard	Senior
24	Sharielle Smith	5–10	Forward	Senior
10	Steffi Sorensen	5–10	Guard	Senior
13	Azania Stewart	6–4	Center	Sophomore
2	Lonnika Thompson	5–4	Guard	Senior
20	Susan Yenser	5–10	Guard	Senior (RS)

=== Schedule ===
Date	Location	Opponent	Result	Record
Sat., Nov. 14	Gainesville, FL	Stetson	W 85–63	1–0
Tue., Nov. 17	Gainesville, FL	#13/10 Florida State	L 62–66	1–1
Fri., Nov. 20	Pittsburgh, PA	#25 Pittsburgh	L 58–81	1–2
Tue., Nov. 24	Gainesville, FL	Alabama–Birmingham	W 75–39	2–2
Fri., Nov. 27	Miami, FL	St. John's	L 47–61	2–3
Sun., Nov. 29	Miami, FL	Florida International	W 71–60	3–3
Tue., Dec. 1	Gainesville, FL	Florida A&M	L 71–72	3–4
Mon., Dec. 7	Piscataway, NJ	Rutgers (Jimmy V Classic)	L 38–51	3–5
Fri., Dec. 11	Norfolk, VA	Old Dominion	W 81–67	4–5
Sun., Dec. 20	Gainesville, FL	Southern	W 62–35	5–5
Mon., Dec. 21	Gainesville, FL	High Point	L 68–75	5–6
Mon., Dec. 28	Gainesville, FL	Ohio	W 78–49	6–6
Wed., Dec. 30	Gainesville, FL	Jacksonville	W 80–54	7–6
Sun., Jan. 3	Fayetteville, AR	Arkansas	W 59–53	8–6 (1–0)
Thu., Jan. 7	Gainesville, FL	Auburn	W 71–68	9–6 (2–0)
Sun., Jan. 10	Athens, GA	#8 Georgia	L 52–61	9–7 (2–1)
Thu., Jan. 14	Gainesville, FL	#4 Tennessee	L 64–66	9-8 (2–2)
Sun., Jan. 17	Starkville, MS	Mississippi State	W 55–52	10–8 (3–2)
Thu., Jan. 21	Tuscaloosa, AL	Alabama	L 58–82	10–9 (3–3)
Sun., Jan. 24	Gainesville, FL	South Carolina	W 59–56	11–9 (4–3)
Sun., Jan. 31	Oxford, MS	Ole Miss	W 67–64	12–9 (5–3)
Thu., Feb. 4	Gainesville, FL	#22 Vanderbilt	L 58–66	12–10 (5–4)
Sun., Feb. 7	Gainesville, FL	Mississippi State	W 80–78	13–10 (6–4)
Thu., Feb. 11	Gainesville, FL	#23 LSU	L 30–70	13–11 (6–5)
Sun., Feb. 14	Knoxville, TN	#4 Tennessee	L 44–83	13–12 (6–6)
Thu., Feb. 18	Lexington, KY	#16 Kentucky	L 51–77	13–13 (6–7)
Sun., Feb. 21	Gainesville, FL	#20 Georgia	W 64–57	14–13 (7–7)
Wed., Feb. 24	Nashville, TN	#22 Vanderbilt	L 60–71	14–14 (7–8)
Sun., Feb. 28	Gainesville, FL	Alabama	L 61–66	14–15 (7–9)
Thu., Mar. 4	Duluth, GA (SEC Tournament)	Auburn	L 61–74	14–16 (7–9)
Thu., Mar. 18	Gainesville, FL (WNIT)	South Florida	W 61–54	15–16 (7–9)
Sun., Mar. 21	Coral Gables, FL (WNIT)	Miami	L 64–77	15–17 (7–9)
