= 2009–10 Clemson Tigers women's basketball team =

Intercollegiate basketball season

2009–10 Clemson Tigers women's basketball
- Conference: Atlantic Coast Conference
- Record: 13–18 (4–10 ACC)
- Head coach: Cristy McKinney (5th season)
- Home arena: Littlejohn Coliseum

2009–10 ACC women's basketball standings
	Conf.				Overall
Team	W		L	PCT	W		L	PCT
Duke	12	–	2	.857	30	–	6	.833
Florida State	12	–	2	.857	29	–	6	.829
Virginia	9	–	5	.643	21	–	10	.677
Georgia Tech	8	–	6	.571	23	–	10	.697
North Carolina State	7	–	7	.500	20	–	14	.588
Wake Forest	7	–	7	.500	18	–	14	.563
North Carolina	6	–	8	.429	19	–	12	.613
Boston College	6	–	8	.429	17	–	15	.531
Maryland	5	–	9	.357	21	–	13	.618
Miami	4	–	10	.286	22	–	14	.611
Virginia Tech	4	–	10	.286	15	–	15	.500
Clemson	4	–	10	.286	13	–	18	.419
† 2010 ACC Tournament winner Rankings from AP Poll

The 2009–10 Clemson Tigers women's basketball team represented Clemson University during the 2009–10 NCAA Division I women's basketball season. The Tigers were led by fifth year head coach Cristy McKinney. The Tigers, members of the Atlantic Coast Conference, played their home games at Littlejohn Coliseum.

== Canadian tour ==
The Clemson Women's Basketball team wrapped up a successful western Canadian Tour, with a 4-2 record. The Lady Tigers played two games against the Canadian National team, and one each versus the University of British Columbia, Trinity Western, University College of the Fraser Valley, and Vancouver Island University. Clemson is widely regarded as the first women's team from a major NCAA conference to visit many of these universities. Clemson won the four games without All-ACC player Lele Hardy, who made the trip but was unable to participate due to injury.

Date time, TV	Rank^{#}	Opponent^{#}	Result	Record	Site city, state
August 7, 2009*		at Team Canada	L 61–79	0–1	Langley Events Centre; Langley, British Columbia
August 7, 2009*		at Trinity Western Spartans	W 72–52	1–1	Langley Events Centre; Langley, British Columbia
August 8, 2009*		at Team Canada	L 42–79	1–2	Envision Athletics Centre; Abbotsford, British Columbia
August 8, 2009*		at UFV Cascades	W 85–76	2–2	Envision Athletics Centre; Abbotsford, British Columbia
August 9, 2009*		at UBC Thunderbirds	W 94–79	3–2	UBC War Memorial Gymnasium; Vancouver, British Columbia
August 12, 2009*		at Vancouver Island Mariners	W 84–39	4–2	Vancouver Island Gym; Nanaimo, British Columbia
*Non-conference game. ^{#}Rankings from AP Poll. (#) Tournament seedings in parentheses.

== Schedule ==
Date time, TV	Rank^{#}	Opponent^{#}	Result	Record	Site city, state
November 13, 2009*		Furman	W 68–48	1–0	Littlejohn Coliseum; Clemson, South Carolina
November 16, 2009*		at College of Charleston	L 55–68	1–1	John Kresse Arena; Charleston, South Carolina
November 19, 2009*		South Carolina rivalry	W 94–92 ^{OT}	2–1	Littlejohn Coliseum; Clemson, South Carolina
November 24, 2009*		at Kennesaw State	W 75–69	3–1	KSU Convocation Center; Kennesaw, Georgia
November 27, 2009*		vs. Richmond; WBCA Classic	L 67–86	3–2	Harry A. Gampel Pavilion; Storrs, Connecticut
November 28, 2009*		vs. Hofstra; WBCA Classic	W 69–68	4–2	Harry A. Gampel Pavilion; Storrs, Connecticut
November 29, 2009*		at No. 1 Connecticut; WBCA Classic	L 47–86	4–3	Harry A. Gampel Pavilion; Storrs, Connecticut
December 3, 2009*		at Northwestern; ACC–Big Ten Women's Challenge	W 69–68	5–3	Welsh–Ryan Arena; Evanston, Illinois
December 6, 2009*		Charleston Southern	W 104–52	6–3	Littlejohn Coliseum; Clemson, South Carolina
December 12, 2009*		at Chattanooga	L 56–69	6–4	McKenzie Arena; Chattanooga, Tennessee
December 15, 2009*		USC Upstate	W 78–65	7–4	Littlejohn Coliseum; Clemson, South Carolina
December 19, 2009*		at Ohio	W 89–81 ^{OT}	8–4	Convocation Center; Athens, Ohio
December 21, 2009*		Wofford	W 67–51	9–4	Littlejohn Coliseum; Clemson, South Carolina
December 28, 2009*		No. 9 Georgia	L 47–59	9–5	Littlejohn Coliseum; Clemson, South Carolina
December 30, 2009*		Georgetown	L 57–72	9–6	Littlejohn Coliseum; Clemson, South Carolina
January 4, 2010*		at Charlotte	L 57–64	9–7	Dale F. Halton Arena; Charlotte, North Carolina
January 7, 2010		No. 9 Duke	L 41–67	9–8 (0–1)	Littlejohn Coliseum; Clemson, South Carolina
January 11, 2010		at No. 21 Georgia Tech	L 58–72	9–9 (0–2)	Alexander Memorial Coliseum; Atlanta, Georgia
January 14, 2010		No. 16 Florida State	L 50–80	9–10 (0–3)	Littlejohn Coliseum; Clemson, South Carolina
January 22, 2010		at No. 14 North Carolina	L 61–79	9–11 (0–4)	Carmichael Arena; Chapel Hill, North Carolina
January 24, 2010		at Wake Forest	L 43–63	9–12 (0–5)	LJVM Coliseum; Winston-Salem, North Carolina
January 29, 2010		Boston College	W 68–65	10–12 (1–5)	Littlejohn Coliseum; Clemson, South Carolina
January 31, 2010		NC State	W 69–56	11–12 (2–5)	Littlejohn Coliseum; Clemson, South Carolina
February 4, 2010		at No. 24 Virginia	L 60–82	11–13 (2–6)	John Paul Jones Arena; Charlottesville, Virginia
February 8, 2010		No. 21 Georgia Tech	L 53–68	11–14 (2–7)	Littlejohn Coliseum; Clemson, South Carolina
February 11, 2010		at No. 10 Florida State	L 50–67	11–15 (2–8)	Donald L. Tucker Civic Center; Tallahassee, Florida
February 14, 2010		at Maryland	L 51–71	11–16 (2–9)	Comcast Center; College Park, Maryland
February 18, 2010		Miami (FL)	W 73–72 ^{OT}	12–16 (3–9)	Littlejohn Coliseum; Clemson, South Carolina
February 25, 2010		at Virginia Tech	L 67–70	12–17 (3–10)	Cassell Coliseum; Blacksburg, Virginia
February 28, 2010		Wake Forest	W 67–62	13–17 (4–10)	Littlejohn Coliseum; Clemson, South Carolina
ACC Tournament
March 4, 2010*		vs. NC State; ACC Tournament first round	L 54–59	13–18 (4–10)	Greensboro Coliseum; Greensboro, North Carolina
*Non-conference game. ^{#}Rankings from AP Poll. (#) Tournament seedings in parentheses.

== See also ==
- 2009–10 ACC women’s basketball season
