= 2009–10 Virginia Cavaliers women's basketball team =

Intercollegiate basketball season

2009–10 Virginia Cavaliers women's basketball
- Conference: Atlantic Coast Conference
- Head coach: Debbie Ryan
- Assistant coaches: Tim Taylor; Angel Elderkin; Wendy Palmer

2009–10 ACC women's basketball standings
	Conf.				Overall
Team	W		L	PCT	W		L	PCT
Duke	12	–	2	.857	30	–	6	.833
Florida State	12	–	2	.857	29	–	6	.829
Virginia	9	–	5	.643	21	–	10	.677
Georgia Tech	8	–	6	.571	23	–	10	.697
North Carolina State	7	–	7	.500	20	–	14	.588
Wake Forest	7	–	7	.500	18	–	14	.563
North Carolina	6	–	8	.429	19	–	12	.613
Boston College	6	–	8	.429	17	–	15	.531
Maryland	5	–	9	.357	21	–	13	.618
Miami	4	–	10	.286	22	–	14	.611
Virginia Tech	4	–	10	.286	15	–	15	.500
Clemson	4	–	10	.286	13	–	18	.419
† 2010 ACC Tournament winner Rankings from AP Poll

The 2009–10 Virginia Cavaliers women's basketball team represented the University of Virginia in the 2009–2010 NCAA Division I basketball season. The team was coached by Debbie Ryan. The Cavaliers were a member of the Atlantic Coast Conference.

== Offseason ==
- August 20: Virginia senior guard Monica Wright was named one of 31 frontrunners for the Women's Wooden Award. During the 2008-09 season, she was the Associated Press honorable mention All-America nod and a spot on the All-ACC first team.
- August 25: Kelly Hartig has transferred from the University of Virginia. Hartig appeared in 34 games last season as a sophomore, and started 32.

== Regular season ==
=== Roster ===
Note: Flags indicate national team eligibility at FIBA sanctioned events. Players may hold other non-FIBA nationality not displayed.

No.		Position	Player
1	(United States)	G	China Crosby
2	(United States)	G	Whitny Edwards
3	(United States)	G	Paulisha Kellum
4	(United States)	C	Simone Egwu
5	(United States)	F	Erinn Thompson
14	(United States)	G	Lexie Gerson

No.		Position	Player
15	(United States)	G	Ariana Moorer
22	(United States)	G	Monica Wright
30	(United States)	F	Telia McCall
32	(United States)	F	Jayna Hartig
34	(United States)	F	Britny Edwards
50	(United States)	F	Chelsea Shine

=== Schedule ===
Date	Opponent	Location	Time	Score
Fri, Nov 13	@ UMBC	Baltimore, MD	7 p.m.	W, 68-57
Sun, Nov 15	Manhattan	Charlottesville, VA	2 p.m.	W, 86-68
Wed, Nov 18	USC Upstate	Charlottesville, VA	7 p.m.	W, 110-63
Sun, Nov 22	Tennessee	Charlottesville, VA	2 p.m.	L, 63-77
Thu, Nov 26	Indiana	Freeport, Grand Bahama Island	2:15 p.m.	W, 84-79
Fri, Nov 27	South Dakota State	Freeport, Grand Bahama Island	8 p.m.	W, 78-66
Thu, Dec 03	Purdue	Charlottesville, VA	7 p.m.	W, 56-49
Sun, Dec 06	James Madison	Charlottesville, VA	4 p.m.	L, 73-75
Tue, Dec 08	Furman	Charlottesville, VA	7 p.m.	W, 74-43
Sun, Dec 20	@ Georgia	Athens, GA	2:30 p.m.	L, 53-69
Mon, Dec 28	Samford	Charlottesville, VA	7 p.m.	W, 69-60
Tue, Dec 29	Liberty	Charlottesville, VA	7 p.m.	W, 63-54
Sat, Jan 02	@ Colorado	Boulder, CO	3:30 p.m.	W, 74-59
Mon, Jan 04	St. Bonaventure	Charlottesville, VA	7 p.m.	72-64
Thu, Jan 07	@Florida State *	Tallahassee, FL	7 p.m.	L, 50-68
Mon, Jan 11	Maryland *	Charlottesville, VA	7:30 p.m.	L, 60-61
Mon, Jan 18	@ Virginia Tech *	Blacksburg, VA	5 p.m.	W, 70-56
Thu, Jan 21	@ Boston College *	Chesnut Hill, MA	7 p.m.	W, 70-68
Sun, Jan 24	Georgia Tech *	Charlottesville, VA	1 p.m.	W, 57-55
Wed, Jan 27	NC State *	Charlottesville, VA	7 p.m.	W, 73-60
Sun, Jan 31	@ Wake Forest *	Winston-Salem, NC	1 p.m.	L, 57-64
Thu, Feb 04	Clemson *	Charlottesville, VA	7 p.m.	W, 82-60
Mon, Feb 08	@ Maryland *	College Park, MD	7 p.m.	W, 82-68
Thu, Feb 11	@ Miami *	Coral Gables, FL	7 p.m.	W, 69-63 (OT)
Mon, Feb 15	North Carolina *	Charlottesville, VA	7 p.m.	W, 82-78 (2OT)
Tue, Feb 16	Longwood	Charlottesville, VA	7 p.m.	W, 81-40
Mon, Feb 22	Florida State *	Charlottesville, VA	7 p.m.	L, 58-59
Fri, Feb 26	@ Duke *	Durham, NC	8:30 p.m.	L, 65-83
Sun, Feb 28	Virginia Tech *	Charlottesville, VA	1 p.m.	W, 55-46

== ACC tournament ==
Date	Opponent	Location	Time	Score
03/05/10	NC State	Greensboro, NC	8:00 pm	L, 59-66

== Postseason ==
=== NCAA tournament ===
Date	Opponent	Location	Time	Score
03/21/10	Green Bay	Ames, IA	6:20 pm	L, 67-69

== Team players drafted into the WNBA ==
Round	Pick	Player	WNBA club
1st	2nd	Monica Wright	Minnesota Lynx

== See also ==
- 2009–10 ACC women’s basketball season
- List of Atlantic Coast Conference women's basketball regular season champions
- List of Atlantic Coast Conference women's basketball tournament champions
