= Lauren Lueders =

American basketball player

Personal information
- Born: September 8, 1987 (age 38) Jackson, Missouri, U.S.
- Listed height: 5 ft 8 in (1.73 m)

Career information
- High school: Saxony Lutheran (Jackson, Missouri)
- College: Vanderbilt (2006–2010)
- WNBA draft: 2010: undrafted
- Position: Guard
- Number: 5

Lauren Lueders (born September 8, 1987) is an American basketball player.

== Playing career ==
=== High school ===
Lueders played her high school basketball at Saxony Lutheran in Missouri. She was a three-year starter for the Crusaders boys' basketball team. It was a small, private school in Jackson, Missouri that did not adopt a girls' basketball team until 2006. In her senior year, she was named the team captain. In her three years, the Crusaders had a 75-24 record. Statistically, she averaged 9.1 ppg and 6.0 apg as the squad's starting point guard and won a pair of conference championships. Following her senior season, she was a first-team All-State selection. Lueders was also a finalist for Miss Show-Me Basketball, an award presented by the Missouri Coaches Association. She participated in the St. John's Sports Medicine All-Star Game with the top girls' basketball players in Missouri and scored 16 points and added eight rebounds to lead the White squad. She also played AAU ball for Mike Taylor's St. Louis Gameface.

=== Vanderbilt ===
In 2006-07, she appeared in 29 of Vanderbilt's 34 games as a freshman and made 12 starts in the middle of the season. her first collegiate start was on Dec. 3 at UAB. After the start, she remained in the starting lineup through the Florida game in January. In her freshman year, she averaged 3.2 points in 10.8 minutes per game. On three occasions, she scored in double-figures, including a personal-best 12 points against Indiana State in the championship of the 2006 VU Holiday Classic. She shot 43.2 percent from behind the arc to rank fourth on the nation's best three-point shooting team. Statistically, she also connected on 82 percent of her free throws. Season highs with four assists and three steals were posted against Dartmouth. In 2007-08, she hit multiple three-pointers in 14 games. Against South Carolina, she scored 11 points including three three-pointers against South Carolina. Her first SEC points of the season was six points against Ole Miss. As a starter, Lueders averaged nearly 10 points per game as a starter. She matched her career high in steals with three against Colorado. She scored 13 points against St. Mary's and then scored a career-high 14 points, including 3-of-7 from behind-the-arc to lead VU over Iowa State.

=== Vanderbilt statistics ===
Legend
GP	Games played	GS	Games started	MPG	Minutes per game
FG%	Field goal percentage	3P%	3-point field goal percentage	FT%	Free throw percentage
RPG	Rebounds per game	APG	Assists per game	SPG	Steals per game
BPG	Blocks per game	PPG	Points per game	**Bold**	Career high

Year	Team	GP	Points	FG%	3P%	FT%	RPG	APG	SPG	BPG	PPG
2006-07	Vanderbilt	29	94	**45.8%**	**43.2%**	**81.8%**	1.5	0.7	0.2	**0.1**	3.2
2007-08	Vanderbilt	29	149	36.4%	37.8%	42.9%	1.8	1.1	**0.7**	-	5.1
2008-09	Vanderbilt	24	61	38.2%	35.0%	62.5%	1.3	1.1	0.5	0.0	2.5
2009-10	Vanderbilt	**34**	**252**	41.3%	38.2%	72.7%	**3.9**	**1.7**	**0.7**	-	**7.4**
Career		116	556	40.1%	38.3%	69.5%	2.3	1.2	0.5	0.0	4.8

== Awards and honors ==
- High school, named to the All-Southeast Missourian girls basketball team
- Nominnee for Miss Show-Me Basketball 2006
- Holds numerous Saxony Lutheran school records, including season and career marks for free throw percentage and three-point shooting

== Career stats ==
Season	Games Played	Minutes	Field Goals	Three Pointers	Free Throws	Rebounds	Assists	Blocks	Steals	Points
2006-07	29	314	33	19	9	43	19	2	7	94
2007-08	29	451	52	42	3	53	31	0	19	149
2008-09	24	186	21	14	5	31	26	1	11	61
