= 2009–10 North Carolina Tar Heels women's basketball team =

Intercollegiate basketball season

2009–10 North Carolina Tar Heels women's basketball
- Conference: Atlantic Coast Conference
- Record: 18-10 (6-8 ACC)
- Head coach: Sylvia Hatchell
- Home arena: Carmichael Arena

2009–10 ACC women's basketball standings
	Conf.				Overall
Team	W		L	PCT	W		L	PCT
Duke	12	–	2	.857	30	–	6	.833
Florida State	12	–	2	.857	29	–	6	.829
Virginia	9	–	5	.643	21	–	10	.677
Georgia Tech	8	–	6	.571	23	–	10	.697
North Carolina State	7	–	7	.500	20	–	14	.588
Wake Forest	7	–	7	.500	18	–	14	.563
North Carolina	6	–	8	.429	19	–	12	.613
Boston College	6	–	8	.429	17	–	15	.531
Maryland	5	–	9	.357	21	–	13	.618
Miami	4	–	10	.286	22	–	14	.611
Virginia Tech	4	–	10	.286	15	–	15	.500
Clemson	4	–	10	.286	13	–	18	.419
† 2010 ACC Tournament winner Rankings from AP Poll

The 2009–10 North Carolina Tar Heels women's basketball team represented the University of North Carolina in the 2009–10 NCAA Division I women's basketball season. The Tar Heels were coached by Sylvia Hatchell. They played their home games at newly-renovated Carmichael Arena as members of the Atlantic Coast Conference.

== Offseason ==
- May 5: The Atlantic Coast Conference and the Big Ten Conference announced the pairings for the annual Big Ten/ACC Challenge for women's basketball, which was in its third year of a four-year agreement. The Tar Heels would face Michigan State in East Lansing, Michigan, on December 3.
- May 17: USA Basketball announced the 14 finalists for the 2009 USA Women's U19 World Championship Team. North Carolina's Chay Shegog was among the finalists. The finalists would return to Colorado Springs on July 9 to begin training for the 2009 FIBA U19 World Championship, which was to be held July 23-Aug. 2 in Bangkok, Thailand.
- May 14:Tar Heels head coach Sylvia Hatchell and Atlantic Coast Conference commissioner John Swofford were among six honorees inducted into the 2009 North Carolina Sports Hall of Fame.
- July 30: The Women's Basketball Coaches Association (WBCA), on behalf of the Wade Coalition, announced the 2009-2010 preseason "Wade Watch" list for The State Farm Wade Trophy Division I Player of the Year. North Carolina senior forward Jessica Breland was one of 25 named to the list, which includes the top NCAA Division I student-athletes who best embody the spirit of Lily Margaret Wade. This is based on the following criteria: game and season statistics, leadership, character, effect on their team and overall playing ability.
- August 21: The 2009-10 preseason candidates list for the Women's Wooden Award was released, naming 31 student athletes, including Jessica Breland from North Carolina.

== Roster ==
Name	#	Height	Position	Year	Home town
Nyree Williams	00	6'1"	Forward	Freshman	Ellicott City, MD
She'la White	1	5'5"	Guard	Sophomore	Portsmouth, VA
Trinity Bursey	3	5'10"	Forward	Senior	Sanford, NC
Candace Wood	4	5'11"	Guard	Redshirt	Charlotte, NC
Nicole Powell	5	5'10"	Guard	Junior	Asheville, NC
Chay Shegog	20	6'5"	Forward/center	Sophomore	Stafford, VA
Krista Gross	21	6'0"	Guard	Freshman	Charlotte, NC
Cetera DeGraffenreid	22	5'6"	Guard	Junior	Cullowhee, NC
Martina Wood	30	6'2"	Forward/center	Senior	Charlotte, NC
Waltiea Rolle	32	6'6"	Forward/center	Freshman	Nassau, Bahamas
Laura Broomfield	33	6'1"	Forward	Sophomore	Lexington Park, MD
Cierra Robertson-Warren	42	6'4"	Forward	Freshman	Rancho Cucamonga, CA
Tierra Ruffin-Pratt	44	5'10"	Guard	Freshman	Alexandria, VA
Italee Lucas	50	5'8"	Guard	Junior	Las Vegas, NV
Jessica Breland	51	6'3"	Forward	Senior	Kelford, NC

== Schedule & results ==
=== Preseason ===
Date	Location	Opponent	Score
Nov. 5	Chapel Hill	Francis Marion	105-64
Nov. 10	Chapel Hill	Carson-Newman	121-52

=== Regular season ===
Date	Location	Opponent	Score	Leading scorer	Record
Nov. 13	Chapel Hill	College of Charleston	W 88-57		1-0
Nov. 18	Chapel Hill	Coastal Carolina	W 88-49		2-0
Nov. 22	Las Vegas, NV	UNLV	W 78-68	Lucas with 24	3-0
Nov. 25	Chapel Hill	Presbyterian	W 92-37	Ruffin-Pratt with 12	4-0
Nov. 29	Chapel Hill	Charleston Southern	W 76-67	Ruffin-Pratt with 16	5-0
Dec. 3	East Lansing, MI	Michigan State	L 66-72	Lucas with 29	5-1
Dec. 6	Chapel Hill	St. John's	W 83-73	Lucas with 17	6-1
Dec. 8	Chapel Hill	Radford	W 74-48	DeGraffenreid with 15	7-1
Dec. 13	Chapel Hill	Gardner-Webb	W 81-65	DeGraffenreid with 19	8-1
Dec. 20	Myrtle Beach, SC	South Carolina	W 93-85		9-1
Dec. 29	Chapel Hill	Kennesaw State	W 89-44	Lucas with 16	10-1
Dec. 31	Chapel Hill	East Tennessee State	W 104-65	Lucas with 17	11-1
Jan. 2	Chapel Hill	Winston Salem	W 101-38	White with 12	12-1
Jan. 6	Chapel Hill	Georgia Tech	W 89-78	Lucas with 28	13-1
Jan. 9	Storrs, CT	UConn	L 47-88	White with 9	13-2
Jan. 14	Blacksburg, VA	Virginia Tech	L 64-79	White with 12	13-3
Jan. 17	Chapel Hill	Maryland	W 75-64		14-3
Jan. 22	Chapel Hill	Clemson	W 79-61	DeGraffenreid with 12	15-3
Jan. 25	Raleigh, NC	NC State	W 81-69	Lucas with 33	16-3
Feb. 1	Chapel Hill	Florida State	L 73-83	Shegog with 16	16-4
Feb. 4	Coral Gables, FL	Miami	L 69-80	Rolle with 20	16-5
Feb. 8	Durham, NC	Duke	L 51-79	Shegog with 8	16-6
Feb. 11	Chapel Hill	Boston College	L 62-69	Rolle with 11	16-7
Feb. 15	Charlottesville, VA	Virginia	L 78-82 2OT	Lucas with 27	16-8
Feb. 18	Winston-Salem, NC	Wake Forest	W 65-59 OT		17–8
Feb. 21	Chapel Hill	NC State	L 63-74		17-9
Feb. 26	Atlanta, GA	Georgia Tech	L 57-64		17-10
Feb. 28	Chapel Hill	Duke	W 64-54	DeGraffenreid with 22	18-10
Mar. 4	Chapel Hill	Maryland	L 77-83	DeGraffenreid with 23	18-11
Mar. 14	Chapel Hill	North Carolina Central	W 88-66	Shegog with 17	19-11
