= 2009–10 NC State Wolfpack women's basketball team =

Intercollegiate basketball season

2009–10 NC State Wolfpack women's basketball

NCAA, 1st Round
- Conference: Atlantic Coast Conference
- Record: 20–14 (7–7 ACC)
- Head coach: Kellie Harper
- Assistant coaches: Stephanie McCormick; Jon Harper; Richard Barron
- Home arena: Reynolds Coliseum

2009–10 ACC women's basketball standings
| | Conf. | | | | Overall |
| Team | W | | L | PCT | W | | L | PCT |
|---|---|---|---|---|---|---|---|---|
| Duke | 12 | – | 2 | .857 | 30 | – | 6 | .833 |
| Florida State | 12 | – | 2 | .857 | 29 | – | 6 | .829 |
| Virginia | 9 | – | 5 | .643 | 21 | – | 10 | .677 |
| Georgia Tech | 8 | – | 6 | .571 | 23 | – | 10 | .697 |
| North Carolina State | 7 | – | 7 | .500 | 20 | – | 14 | .588 |
| Wake Forest | 7 | – | 7 | .500 | 18 | – | 14 | .563 |
| North Carolina | 6 | – | 8 | .429 | 19 | – | 12 | .613 |
| Boston College | 6 | – | 8 | .429 | 17 | – | 15 | .531 |
| Maryland | 5 | – | 9 | .357 | 21 | – | 13 | .618 |
| Miami | 4 | – | 10 | .286 | 22 | – | 14 | .611 |
| Virginia Tech | 4 | – | 10 | .286 | 15 | – | 15 | .500 |
| Clemson | 4 | – | 10 | .286 | 13 | – | 18 | .419 |
† 2010 ACC Tournament winner Rankings from AP Poll

The 2009–10 NC State Wolfpack women's basketball team represented North Carolina State University in the 2009–10 women's college basketball season. They were coached by Kellie Harper and played their home games in Reynolds Coliseum in Raleigh, North Carolina. The Wolfpack were a member of the Atlantic Coast Conference.

== 2009–10 roster ==
Note: Flags indicate national team eligibility at FIBA sanctioned events. Players may hold other non-FIBA nationality not displayed.

| No. | | Position | Player |
|---|---|---|---|
| 00 | (United States) | G | Amber White |
| 2 | (United States) | G | Nikitta Gartrell |
| 3 | (United States) | G | Kim Durham |
| 4 | (United States) | F | Tia Bell |
| 11 | (United States) | G | Emili Tasler |
| 15 | (Latvia) | C | Inga Muciniece |
| 21 | (United States) | F | Brittany Strachan |
| 22 | (United States) | F | Bonae Holston |
| 23 | (United States) | G | Marissa Kastanek |
| 24 | (United States) | F | Lucy Ellison |
| 25 | (United States) | F | Kelsie Lliteras |
| 31 | (United States) | G | Sharnise Beal |
| 52 | (United States) | C | Hanna Halteman |

== 2009–10 schedule ==
| Date time, TV | Rank^{#} | Opponent^{#} | Result | Record | Site city, state |
Exhibition
| Mon, Nov 2*; 7:00pm | | North Greenville | W 87–44 | | Reynolds Coliseum; Raleigh, NC |
Regular season
| Fri, Nov 13*; 8:00pm | | Florida International; Sheraton Raleigh Wolfpack Invitational | W 87–71 | 1–0 | Reynolds Coliseum; Raleigh, NC |
| Sat, Nov 14*; 6:00pm | | Vermont; Sheraton Raleigh Wolfpack Invitational | L 47–52 | 1–1 | Reynolds Coliseum; Raleigh, NC |
| Tue, Nov 17*; 7:00pm | | Florida Atlantic | W 84–70 | 2–1 | Reynolds Coliseum; Raleigh, NC |
| Fri, Nov 20*; 7:00pm | | Davidson | W 79–54 | 3–1 | Reynolds Coliseum; Raleigh, NC |
| Mon, Nov 23*; 7:00pm | | at Old Dominion | W 62–52 | 4–1 | Ted Constant Convocation Center; Norfolk, VA |
| Fri, Nov 27*; 5:00pm | | vs. Northwestern State; Vanderbilt Thanksgiving Tournament | W 76–67 | 5–1 | Memorial Gymnasium; Nashville, TN |
| Sat, Nov 28*; 5:00pm | | at No. 21 Vanderbilt; Vanderbilt Thanksgiving Tournament | L 71–77 | 5–2 | Memorial Gymnasium; Nashville, TN |
| Thu, Dec 3*; 7:00pm | | Wisconsin; ACC – Big Ten Challenge | L 48–53 | 5–3 | Reynolds Coliseum; Raleigh, NC |
| Sun, Dec 6*; 2:00pm | | Texas Christian | W 76–62 | 6–3 | Reynolds Coliseum; Raleigh, NC |
| Sun, Dec 13*; 2:00pm, SS | | at South Carolina | L 71–74 | 6–4 | Colonial Life Arena; Columbia, SC |
| Sat, Dec 19*; 5:00pm | | Winthrop | W 66–53 | 7–4 | Reynolds Coliseum; Raleigh, NC |
| Tue, Dec 22*; 7:00pm | | at Georgetown | L 66–67 | 7–5 | Verizon Center; Washington, DC |
| Mon, Dec 28*; 7:00pm | | Seton Hall | W 68–57 | 8–5 | Reynolds Coliseum; Raleigh, NC |
| Wed, Dec 30*; 9:00pm | | at Southern California | W 59–53 | 9–5 | Galen Center; Los Angeles, CA |
| Mon, Jan 4*; 7:00pm | | Columbia | W 60–58 | 10–5 | Reynolds Coliseum; Raleigh, NC |
| Thu, Jan 7; 7:00pm | | Maryland | W 73–45 | 11–5 (1–0) | Reynolds Coliseum; Raleigh, NC |
| Sun, Jan 10; 2:00pm | | at Boston College | L 66–83 | 11–6 (1–1) | Conte Forum; Chestnut Hill, MA |
| Sun, Jan 17; 2:00pm | | at No. 16 Florida State | L 71–74 | 11–7 (1–2) | Donald L. Tucker Center; Tallahassee, FL |
| Fri, Jan 22; 6:30pm, FSN | | Wake Forest | W 51–49 | 12–7 (2–2) | Reynolds Coliseum; Raleigh, NC |
| Mon, Jan 25; 7:00pm, FSN | | No. 12 North Carolina; NC State – North Carolina rivalry | L 69–81 | 12–8 (2–3) | Reynolds Coliseum; Raleigh, NC |
| Wed, Jan 27; 7:00pm | | at No. 21 Virginia | L 60–73 | 12–9 (2–4) | John Paul Jones Arena; Charlottesville, VA |
| Sun, Jan 31; 2:00pm | | at Clemson | L 56–69 | 12–10 (2–5) | Littlejohn Coliseum; Clemson, SC |
| Sun, Feb 7; 4:00pm, FSN | | Virginia Tech | W 70–57 | 13–10 (3–5) | Reynolds Coliseum; Raleigh, NC |
| Thu, Feb 11; 7:00pm | | at No. 8 Duke | L 39–70 | 13–11 (3–6) | Cameron Indoor Stadium; Durham, NC |
| Sun, Feb 14; 5:30pm, ESPN2 | | Miami; Hoops 4 Hope | W 66–64 | 14–11 (4–6) | Reynolds Coliseum; Raleigh, NC |
| Fri, Feb 19; 6:30pm, FSN | | Boston College; Pack the House | W 73–62 | 15–11 (5–6) | Reynolds Coliseum; Raleigh, NC |
| Sun, Feb 21; 2:00pm | | at North Carolina; NC State – North Carolina rivalry | W 74–63 | 16–11 (6–6) | Carmichael Auditorium; Chapel Hill, NC |
| Thu, Feb 25; 7:00pm | | at Wake Forest | L 50–66 | 16–12 (6–7) | LJVM Coliseum; Winston–Salem, NC |
| Sat, Feb 28; 2:00pm | | No. 22 Georgia Tech | W 54–46 | 17–12 (7–7) | Reynolds Coliseum; Raleigh, NC |
ACC tournament
| Thu, Mar 4; 8:00pm | | vs. Clemson; First Round | W 59–54 | 18–12 | Greensboro Coliseum; Greensboro, NC |
| Fri, Mar 5; 8:00pm | | vs. No. 24 Virginia; Quarterfinals | W 66–59 | 19–12 | Greensboro Coliseum; Greensboro, NC |
| Sat, Mar 6; 3:30pm, FSN | | vs. Boston College; Semifinals | W 63–57 | 20–12 | Greensboro Coliseum; Greensboro, NC |
| Sun, Mar 7; 1:00pm, FSN | | vs. No. 9 Duke; Final | L 60–70 | 20–13 | Greensboro Coliseum; Greensboro, NC |
NCAA tournament
| Sun, Mar 21*; 9:30pm, ESPN2 | | vs. No. 22 UCLA; First Round | L 54–74 | 20–14 | Williams Arena; Minneapolis, MN |
*Non-conference game. ^{#}Rankings from AP Poll. (#) Tournament seedings in parentheses. All times are in Eastern Time.

== Postseason awards ==
- Marissa Kastanek–2010 ACC Freshman of the Year
- Bonae Holston–2010 All–ACC Women's Basketball Honorable Mention
- Bonae Holston–2010 ACC All–Tournament First Team
- Nikitta Gartrell–2010 ACC All–Tournament First Team
- Marissa Kastanek–2010 ACC All–Tournament Second Team

== See also ==
- NC State Wolfpack women's basketball
- 2010 NCAA Division I women's basketball tournament
- 2009–10 NCAA Division I women's basketball season
- 2009–10 NC State Wolfpack men's basketball team
