= List of ACC women's basketball regular season champions =

ACC women's basketball regular season
- Conference basketball regular season
- Sport: College basketball
- Conference: Atlantic Coast Conference
- Number of teams: 12
- Format: Round robin
- Played: 1977–present
- Last contest: 2025–26
- Current champion: Duke
- Most championships: Duke (10 outright, 3 tied)
- TV partner(s): ESPN, ACC Network, ACCRSN
- Official website: theACC.com

The ACC Women's Basketball Regular Season is the season-long competition in basketball for the Atlantic Coast Conference (ACC). It has been held every season since 1977–78, several years before the first NCAA-sanctioned basketball games for women. It is a round-robin tournament with each team playing each other at least once. The final standings decide the seedings for the conference tournament.

== Standings by season ==
Season	Champion	Record	Runner-up	Record
1977–78	NC State	9–0	Maryland	5–1
1978–79	Maryland	6–1	NC State	7–2
1979–80	NC State	9–0	Maryland	5–2
1980–81	Clemson	6–1	NC State	7–2
1981–82	Maryland	6–1	NC State	11–2
1982–83	NC State	12–1	North Carolina +	10–3
1982–83	NC State	12–1	Maryland	10–3
1983–84	Virginia	11–3	Maryland	10–4
1984–85	NC State	13–1	North Carolina	11–3
1985–86	Virginia	13–1	North Carolina	10–4
1986–87	Virginia	12–2	NC State	11–3
1987–88	Virginia *			12–2
1987–88	Maryland			12–2
1988–89	Maryland	13–1	NC State	12–2
1989–90	NC State	12–2	Virginia	11–3
1990–91	Virginia	14–0	Maryland +	9–5
1990–91	Virginia	14–0	NC State	9–5
1991–92	Virginia	15–1	Maryland	13–3
1992–93	Virginia	13–3	Maryland +	11–5
1992–93	Virginia	13–3	North Carolina	11–5
1993–94	Virginia	15–1	North Carolina	14–2
1994–95	Virginia	16–0	North Carolina	12–4
1995–96	Virginia	13–3	Duke	12–4
1996–97	North Carolina	15–1	Virginia	12–4
1997–98	Duke	13–3	Clemson +	12–4
1997–98	Duke	13–3	NC State	12–4
1998–99	Duke	15–1	Virginia	12–4
1999–2000	Virginia	13–3	Duke	12–4
2000–01	Duke	13–3	Clemson	10–6
2001–02	Duke	16–0	North Carolina	11–5
2002–03	Duke	16–0	North Carolina	13–3
2003–04	Duke	15–1	North Carolina	12–4
2004–05	North Carolina *			12–2
2004–05	Duke			12–2
2005–06	North Carolina	13–1	Duke +	12–2
2005–06	North Carolina	13–1	Maryland	12–2
2006–07	Duke	14–0	North Carolina	11–3
2007–08	North Carolina	14–0	Maryland	13–1
2008–09	Maryland *			12–2
2008–09	Florida State			12–2
2009–10	Duke *			12–2
2009–10	Florida State			12–2
2010–11	Duke *			12–2
2010–11	Miami			12–2
2011–12	Duke	15–1	Miami	14–2
2012–13	Duke	17–1	Maryland+	14–4
2012–13	Duke	17–1	North Carolina	14–4
2013–14	Notre Dame	16–0	Duke+	12–4
2013–14	Notre Dame	16–0	Maryland	12–4
2014–15	Notre Dame	15–1	Florida State	14–2
2015–16	Notre Dame	16–0	Louisville	15–1
2016–17	Notre Dame	15–1	Florida State+	13–3
2016–17	Notre Dame	15–1	Duke	13–3
2017–18	Louisville*			15–1
2017–18	Notre Dame			15–1
2018–19	Notre Dame*			14–2
2018–19	Louisville			14–2
2019–20	Louisville	16–2	NC State	14–4
2020–21	Louisville	14–2	NC State	12–2
2021–22	NC State	17–1	Louisville	16–2
2022–23	Notre Dame	15–3	Duke+	14–4
2022–23	Notre Dame	15–3	Virginia Tech	14–4
2023–24	Virginia Tech	14–4	NC State+	13–5
2023–24	Virginia Tech	14–4	Syracuse	13–5
2023–24	Virginia Tech	14–4	Notre Dame	13–5
2024–25	NC State*			16–2
2024–25	Notre Dame			16–2
2025–26	Duke	16–2	Louisville	15–3

* top seed for tournament. + second seed for tournament.

== Performance by school ==
School	Champions	Runner-up	First season
Duke	1997–98, 1998–99, 2000–01, 2001–02, 2002–03, 2003–04, 2004–05, 2006–07, 2009–10, 2010–11, 2011–12, 2012–13, 2025–26 (10 outright, 3 tied)	1995–96, 1999–2000, 2004–05, 2005–06, 2016–17, 2022–23 (3, 3)	1977–78
Virginia	1983–84, 1985–86, 1986–87, 1987–88, 1990–91, 1991–92, 1992–93, 1993–94, 1994–95, 1995–96, 1999–2000 (10, 1)	1989–90, 1996–97, 1998–99 (3, 0)	1977–78
Notre Dame	2013–14, 2014–15, 2015–16, 2016–17, 2017–18, 2018–19, 2022–23, 2024–25 (5, 3)	2023–24 (0, 1)	2013–14
NC State	1977–78, 1979–80, 1982–83, 1984–85, 1989–90, 2021–22, 2024–25 (6, 1)	1978–79, 1980–81, 1981–82, 1986–87, 1988–89, 1990–91, 1997–98, 2019–20, 2020–21, 2023–24 (7, 3)	1977–78
Maryland	1978–79, 1981–82, 1987–88, 1988–89, 2008–09 (3, 2)	1977–78, 1979–80, 1982–83, 1983–84, 1990–91, 1991–92, 1992–93, 2005–06, 2007–08, 2012-13 (5, 5)	1977–78
North Carolina	1996–97, 2004–05, 2005–06, 2007–08 (3, 1)	1982–83, 1984–85, 1985–86, 1992–93, 1993–94, 1994–95, 2002–03, 2003–04, 2006–07, 2012-13 (7, 3)	1977–78
Louisville	2017–18, 2018–19, 2019–20, 2020–21 (2, 2)	2021–22, 2025–26 (2, 0)	2014–15
Florida State	2008–09, 2009–10 (0, 2)	2014–15, 2016–17 (1, 1)	1991–92
Clemson	1980–81 (1, 0)	1997–98, 2000–01 (1, 1)	1977–78
Virginia Tech	2023–24 (1, 0)	2022–23 (0, 1)	2004–05
Miami	2010–11 (0, 1)	2011–12 (1, 0)	2004–05
Syracuse		2023–24 (0, 1)	2013–14
Wake Forest			1977–78
Georgia Tech			1978–79
Boston College			2005–06
Pittsburgh			2013–14

Wake Forest was third in 1987–88; Georgia Tech was tied for third in 2011–12; Boston College was tied for fifth in 2007–08.
