= 2010 Big 12 Conference women's basketball tournament =

Women's Basketball Tournament

- Classification: Division I
- Season: 2009–10
- Teams: 12
- Site: Municipal Auditorium; Kansas City, Missouri
- Champions: Texas A&M (2nd title)
- Winning coach: Gary Blair (2nd title)
- MVP: Danielle Adams (Texas A&M)
- Attendance: 25,412 (overall); 3,120 (championship)
- Television: Metro Sports, FSN

2009–10 Big 12 Conference women's basketball standings
	Conf.				Overall
Team	W		L	PCT	W		L	PCT
No. 4 Nebraska	16	–	0	1.000	32	–	2	.941
No. 16 Iowa State	11	–	5	.688	25	–	8	.758
No. 12 Oklahoma	11	–	5	.688	27	–	11	.711
No. 9 Texas A&M †	10	–	6	.625	26	–	8	.765
No. 17 Texas	10	–	6	.625	22	–	11	.667
No. 14 Baylor	9	–	7	.563	27	–	10	.730
No. 20 Oklahoma State	9	–	7	.563	24	–	11	.686
Texas Tech	5	–	11	.313	18	–	15	.545
Kansas State	5	–	11	.313	14	–	18	.438
Kansas	5	–	11	.313	17	–	16	.515
Colorado	3	–	13	.188	13	–	17	.433
Missouri	2	–	14	.125	12	–	18	.400
† 2010 Big 12 Tournament winner Rankings from AP poll

The 2010 Big 12 Conference women's basketball tournament was the 2010 edition of the Big 12 Conference's championship tournament. It was held at Municipal Auditorium in Kansas City from March 11 through 14, 2010. Texas A&M, as the tournament champion, received an automatic bid to the 2010 NCAA Women's Division I Basketball Tournament.

Nebraska finished the 2009-10 regular season undefeated, but lost in the semifinals to eventual tournament champion Texas A&M. Nebraska was the one seed in the tournament and received a first round bye, along with the other top four seeds. The tournament ran simultaneously with the 2010 Big 12 men's basketball tournament.

== Seeding ==
2010 Big 12 Conference women's basketball tournament seeds
Seed	School	Conf.	Over.	Tiebreaker
1	Nebraska ‡#	16–0	32–2	
2	Iowa State #	11–5	25–8	
3	Oklahoma #	11–5	27–11	
4	Texas A&M #	10–6	26–8	
5	Texas	10–6	22–11	
6	Baylor	9–7	27–10	
7	Oklahoma State	9–7	24–11	
8	Texas Tech	5–11	18–15	
9	Kansas State	5–11	14–18	
10	Kansas	5–11	17–16	
11	Colorado	3–13	13–17	
12	Missouri	2–14	12–18	
‡ – Big 12 Conference regular season champions, and tournament No. 1 seed. # – Received a single-bye in the conference tournament. Overall records include all games played in the Big 12 Conference tournament.

== Schedule ==
Session	Game	Time	Matchup	Television	Attendance
First round – Thursday, March 11
1	1	11:00 am	#9 Kansas State 59 vs #8 Texas Tech 51	Metro Sports	3,412
1	2	1:30 pm	#5 Texas 64 vs #12 Missouri 59	Metro Sports	3,412
2	3	5:00 pm	#7 Oklahoma State 76 vs #10 Kansas 69	Metro Sports	4,239
2	4	7:30 pm	#6 Baylor 72 vs #11 Colorado 65	Metro Sports	4,239
Quarterfinals – Friday, March 12
3	5	11:00 am	#1 Nebraska 63 vs #9 Kansas State 46	FSN	5,603
3	6	1:30 pm	#4 Texas A&M 77 vs #5 Texas 64	FSN	5,603
4	7	5:00 pm	#7 Oklahoma State 62 vs #2 Iowa State 59	FSN	4,363
4	8	7:30 pm	#3 Oklahoma 59 vs #6 Baylor 54	FSN	4,363
Semifinals – Saturday, March 13
5	9	12:00 pm	#4 Texas A&M 80 vs #1 Nebraska 70	FSN	4,675
5	10	2:30 pm	#3 Oklahoma 74 vs #7 Oklahoma State 69	FSN	4,675
Final – Sunday, March 14
6	11	12:30 pm	#4 Texas A&M 74 vs #3 Oklahoma 67	FSN	3,120
Game times in CT. #-Rankings denote tournament seed

== Tournament ==
- Times listed are Central Standard Time zone.

First round (March 11)
8	Texas Tech	51
9	Kansas State	59
5	Texas	64
12	Missouri	59
7	Oklahoma State	76
10	Kansas	69
6	Baylor	72
11	Colorado	65

Quarterfinals (March 12)
1	Nebraska	63
9	Kansas State	46
4	Texas A&M	77
5	Texas	64
2	Iowa State	59
7	Oklahoma State	62
3	Oklahoma	59
6	Baylor	54

Semifinals (March 13)
1	Nebraska	70
4	Texas A&M	80
7	Oklahoma State	69
3	Oklahoma	74

Championship (March 14)
4	Texas A&M	74
3	Oklahoma	67

== All-Tournament team ==
Most Outstanding Player – Danielle Adams, Texas A&M

Player	Team
Danielle Adams	Texas A&M
Danielle Robinson	Oklahoma
Amanda Thompson	Oklahoma
Andrea Riley	Oklahoma State
Tyra White	Texas A&M

== See also ==
- 2010 Big 12 Conference men's basketball tournament
- 2010 NCAA Women's Division I Basketball Tournament
- 2009–10 NCAA Division I women's basketball rankings
