= 2009–10 Kansas State Wildcats women's basketball team =

Intercollegiate basketball season

2009–10 Kansas State Wildcats women's basketball
- Conference: Big 12 Conference
- North
- Record: 9-6 (1-0 Big 12)
- Head coach: Deb Patterson
- Assistant coaches: Kamie Ethridge; Shalee Lehning; Kelly Moylan
- Home arena: Bramlage Coliseum

2009–10 Big 12 Conference women's basketball standings
	Conf.				Overall
Team	W		L	PCT	W		L	PCT
No. 4 Nebraska	16	–	0	1.000	32	–	2	.941
No. 16 Iowa State	11	–	5	.688	25	–	8	.758
No. 12 Oklahoma	11	–	5	.688	27	–	11	.711
No. 9 Texas A&M †	10	–	6	.625	26	–	8	.765
No. 17 Texas	10	–	6	.625	22	–	11	.667
No. 14 Baylor	9	–	7	.563	27	–	10	.730
No. 20 Oklahoma State	9	–	7	.563	24	–	11	.686
Texas Tech	5	–	11	.313	18	–	15	.545
Kansas State	5	–	11	.313	14	–	18	.438
Kansas	5	–	11	.313	17	–	16	.515
Colorado	3	–	13	.188	13	–	17	.433
Missouri	2	–	14	.125	12	–	18	.400
† 2010 Big 12 Tournament winner Rankings from AP poll

The 2009–10 Kansas State Wildcats women's basketball team represented the Kansas State University in the 2009–10 NCAA Division I basketball season. The Wildcats were coached by Deb Patterson. The Wildcats were a member of the Big 12 Conference.

== Offseason ==
- April 9: Kansas State guard Shalee Lehning was selected with the 25th overall selection in the second round of the 2009 WNBA draft by the Atlanta Dream. Lehning became the sixth player in school history to be selected during the WNBA Draft and the eighth player overall to become a part of the league.
- May 13: Former Kansas State forward Marlies Gipson signed a training camp contract with the Atlanta Dream. Gipson joined former K-State teammate Shalee Lehning on the Dream's training camp roster.
- May 13: Former Kansas State guard Shalee Lehning's jersey put on permanent display at the Women's Basketball Hall of Fame in Knoxville, Tennessee. The uniform, her purple road jersey, will be on display in the Hall's “Ring of Honor”, recognizing Lehning's achievements during the 2008–09 season.
- August 21: The 2009-10 preseason candidates list for the Women's Wooden Award was released, naming 31 student athletes. Ashley Sweat from Kansas State was one of the candidates.

== Schedule ==
Date time, TV	Rank^{#}	Opponent^{#}	Result	Record	Site (attendance) city, state
Exhibition
11/3/2009*; 7:00 p.m.		Fort Hays State	W 81-68	0-0	Bramlage Coliseum (3,318); Manhattan, KS
11/9/2009*; 7:00 p.m., K-State Sports Network		Pittsburg State	W 89-61	0-0	Bramlage Coliseum (3,203); Manhattan, KS
Regular Season
11/14/2009*; 5:00 p.m., K-State Sports Network		Indiana State	L 73-77	0-1	Bramlage Coliseum (4,045); Manhattan, KS
11/16/2009*; 7:00 p.m., K-State Sports Network		Arkansas State	L 79-80 ^{OT}	0-2	Bramlage Coliseum (3,150); Manhattan, KS
11/20/2009*; 7:00 p.m., FSN KC		Washington State	W 70-63	1-2	Bramlage Coliseum (3,458); Manhattan, KS
11/23/2009*; 7:05 p.m., K-State Sports Network		at Creighton	L 54-63	1-3	D.J. Sokol Arena (921); Omaha, NE
11/27/2009*; 4:30 p.m., K-State Sports Network		at BYU	W 65-62	2-3	Marriott Center (937); Provo, UT
12/2/2009*; 7:00 p.m., K-State Sports Network		at Arkansas	L 58-60	2-4	Bud Walton Arena (1,570); Fayetteville, AR
12/4/2009*; 6:00 p.m., K-State Sports Network		Grambling State	W 87-62	3-4	Bramlage Coliseum (3,685); Manhattan, KS
12/5/2009*; 3:00 p.m., K-State Sports Network		Missouri State	W 64-60	4-4	Bramlage Coliseum (3,729); Manhattan, KS
12/13/2009*; 2:00 p.m., K-State Sports Network		Northwestern	L 50-53	4-5	Bramlage Coliseum (3,424); Manhattan, KS
12/19/2009*; 9:30 p.m., K-State Sports Network		vs. Hawaii	L 61-71	4-6	Cox Pavilion (749); Las Vegas, NV
12/20/2009*; 4:30 p.m., K-State Sports Network		vs. VCU	W 73-67	5-6	Cox Pavilion; Las Vegas, NV
12/21/2009*; 4:30 p.m., K-State Sports Network		vs. UTSA	W 59-55	6-6	Cox Pavilion; Las Vegas, NV
12/29/2009*; 9:00 p.m., K-State Sports Network		at UC Davis	W 73-59	7-6	The Pavilion (480); Davis, CA
1/2/2010*; 2:00 p.m., K-State Sports Network		Yale	W 78-59	8-6	Bramlage Coliseum (3,579); Manhattan, KS
Big 12 Season
1/9/2010; 11:00 a.m., FSN Kansas City		No. 24 Kansas; Sunflower Showdown	W 59-35	9-6 (1-0)	Bramlage Coliseum (5,799); Manhattan, KS
1/13/2010; 6:00 p.m., K-State Sports Network		at Missouri	W 65-50	10-6 (2-0)	Mizzou Arena (1,249); Columbia, MO
1/16/2010; 7:00 p.m., K-State Sports Network		at No. 15 Oklahoma State	L 56-66	10-7 (2-1)	Gallagher-Iba Arena (3,689); Stillwater, OK
1/20/2010; 7:00 p.m., FSN Kansas City		Colorado	L 57-63	10-8 (2-2)	Bramlage Coliseum (4,076); Manhattan, KS
1/23/2010; 11:00 a.m., FSN		at No. 7 Nebraska	L 56-71	10-9 (2-3)	Bob Devaney Sports Center (13,303); Lincoln, NE
1/31/2010; 2:00 p.m., K-State Sports Network		No. 22 Iowa State	W 73-67	11-9 (3-3)	Bramlage Coliseum (4,925); Manhattan, KS
2/3/2010; 7:00 p.m., K-State Sports Network		No. 15 Baylor	L 47-65	11-10 (3-4)	Bramlage Coliseum (3,893); Manhattan, KS
2/7/2010; 1:00 p.m., Metro Sports		at Kansas; Sunflower Showdown	L 60-70	11-11 (3-5)	Allen Fieldhouse (7,580); Lawrence, KS
2/10/2010; 7:00 p.m., FSN Kansas City		Missouri	W 37-33	12-11 (4-5)	Bramlage Coliseum (3,438); Manhattan, KS
2/23/2010; 7:00 p.m., K-State Sports Network		at No. 13 Texas A&M	L 63-69	12-12 (4-6)	Reed Arena (4,861); College Station, TX
2/17/2010; 7:00 p.m., K-State Sports Network		at No. 12 Texas	L 41-62	12-13 (4-7)	Frank Erwin Center (4,447); Austin, TX
2/21/2010; 2:00 p.m., FSN		No. 11 Oklahoma	L 58-64	12-14 (4-8)	Bramlage Coliseum (4,523); Manhattan, KS
2/24/2010; 7:00 p.m., FSN Kansas City		Texas Tech	L 67-75	12-13 (4-9)	Bramlage Coliseum (3,558); Manhattan, KS
2/27/2010; 7:00 p.m., K-State Sports Network		at No. 15 Iowa State	L 38-49	12-14 (4-10)	Hilton Coliseum (12,015); Ames, IA
3/3/2010; 8:00 p.m., K-State Sports Network		at Colorado	W 72-70	13-14 (5-10)	Coors Events Center (2,125); Boulder, CO
3/6/2010; 12:00 p.m., K-State Sports Network		Nebraska	L 72-82	13-15 (5-11)	Bramlage Coliseum (4,855); Manhattan, KS
Phillips 66 Big 12 Championship
3/11/2010; 11:00 a.m., Big 12 Network		vs. Texas Tech	W 59-51	14-15 (5-11)	Municipal Auditorium; Kansas City, MO
3/12/2010; 11:00 a.m., FSN		vs. No. 3 Nebraska	L 46-63	14-16 (5-11)	Municipal Auditorium; Kansas City, MO
*Non-conference game. ^{#}Rankings from AP Poll. (#) Tournament seedings in parentheses. All times are in Central Time.

== See also ==
- 2009–10 Kansas State Wildcats men's basketball team
