= 2009–10 Missouri Tigers women's basketball team =

Intercollegiate basketball season

2009–10 Missouri Tigers women's basketball
- Conference: Big 12
- Record: 12–18 (2–14 Big 12)
- Head coach: Cindy Stein
- Assistant coaches: Lynnette Robinson; Doshia Woods; Jarod Newland

2009–10 Big 12 Conference women's basketball standings
	Conf.				Overall
Team	W		L	PCT	W		L	PCT
No. 4 Nebraska	16	–	0	1.000	32	–	2	.941
No. 16 Iowa State	11	–	5	.688	25	–	8	.758
No. 12 Oklahoma	11	–	5	.688	27	–	11	.711
No. 9 Texas A&M †	10	–	6	.625	26	–	8	.765
No. 17 Texas	10	–	6	.625	22	–	11	.667
No. 14 Baylor	9	–	7	.563	27	–	10	.730
No. 20 Oklahoma State	9	–	7	.563	24	–	11	.686
Texas Tech	5	–	11	.313	18	–	15	.545
Kansas State	5	–	11	.313	14	–	18	.438
Kansas	5	–	11	.313	17	–	16	.515
Colorado	3	–	13	.188	13	–	17	.433
Missouri	2	–	14	.125	12	–	18	.400
† 2010 Big 12 Tournament winner Rankings from AP poll

The 2009–10 Missouri Tigers women's basketball team represented the University of Missouri in the 2009–10 NCAA Division I women's basketball season. The Tigers competed in the Big 12 conference.

== Offseason ==
- April 17: Sydney Crafton signed a National Letter of Intent to play for the Missouri women's basketball team. Crafton joins Trenee Thornton of Kansas City as a member of the recruiting class. Crafton, playing at Jefferson City High School, averaged 18.1 ppg., 5.8 rpg., 2.7 apg. and 2.1 spg. as a senior for the Lady Jays. She reached double figures in 23 of 25 games as the school recorded an 18–8 record.

== Regular season ==
=== Roster ===
Number	Name	Height	Position	Class
1	Bekah Mills	5–9	Guard	Sophomore
2	Bailey Gee	5–11	Guard	Sophomore
3	Amanda Hanneman	5–11	Forward	Senior
4	Jessra Johnson	6–1	Forward	Senior
10	Jasmyn Otote	5–9	Guard	Junior
11	Toy Richbow	5–6	Guard	Senior
21	Sydney Crafton		Guard	Freshman
22	BreAna Brock	6–2	Forward	Sophomore
23	RaeShara Brown	5–8	Guard	Junior
32	Marissa Scott	6–2	Forward	Senior
34	Kendra Frazier	6–5	Center	Sophomore
44	Shakara Jones	6–2	Forward	Junior
50	Christine Flores	6–3	Forward	Sophomore

=== Schedule ===
Date time, TV	Rank^{#}	Opponent^{#}	Result	Record	Site (attendance) city, state
Exhibition
11/08/2009*		Central Missouri	W 80–59		Mizzou Arena (945); Columbia, MO
Regular season
11/15/2009*; 5:00 pm		Northern Iowa	W 74–57	1–0	Mizzou Arena (1,246); Columbia, MO
11/18/2009*; 6:30 pm, MUTV		Memphis	L 74–75	1–1	Mizzou Arena (1,014); Columbia, MO
11/22/2009*; 1:00 pm, BTN		at Indiana	W 76–71	2–1	Assembly Hall (1,968); Bloomington, IN
11/27/2009*; 4:00 pm		vs. Florida A&M; Seminole Classic	W 69–65	3–1	Donald L. Tucker Center (N/A); Tallahassee, FL
11/29/2009*; 1:00 pm		at No. 9 Florida State; Seminole Classic	L 66–73	3–2	Donald L. Tucker Center (2,026); Tallahassee, FL
12/5/2009*; 12:30 pm, MSN		Ball State	W 66–55	4–2	Mizzou Arena (1,418); Columbia, MO
12/8/2009*; 7:05 pm		at Bradley	W 52–46	5–2	Lorene Ramsey Gym (427); Peoria, IL
12/10/2009*; 6:30 pm		UTPA	W 83–34	6–2	Mizzou Arena (1,219); Columbia, MO
12/13/2009*; 1:00 pm, MSN		Murray State	W 71–32	7–2	Mizzou Arena (1,197); Columbia, MO
12/21/2009*; 6:30 pm		UAPB	W 81–50	8–2	Mizzou Arena (1,041); Columbia, MO
12/28/2009*; 6:30 pm		North Texas	W 71–44	9–2	Mizzou Arena (1,263); Columbia, MO
1/2/2010*; 11:30 am		Duquesne	W 72–66	10–2	Mizzou Arena (1,227); Columbia, MO
1/5/2010*; 6:30 pm, MSN		No. 14 Xavier	L 60–68	10–3	Mizzou Arena (1,187); Columbia, MO
1/9/2010; 1:00 pm, FSN		at Colorado	L 48–64	10–4 (0–1)	Coors Events Center (2,406); Boulder, CO
1/13/2010; 6:00 pm, MSN		Kansas State	L 50–65	10–5 (0–2)	Mizzou Arena (1,249); Columbia, MO
1/17/2010; 1:00 pm		at Kansas; Border War	L 59–72	10–6 (0–3)	Allen Fieldhouse (5,289); Lawrence, KS
1/20/2010; 6:30 pm		No. 13 Oklahoma	L 61–62	10–7 (0–4)	Mizzou Arena (1,347); Columbia, MO
1/23/2010; 1:00 pm		No. 10 Baylor	W 70–62	11–7 (1–4)	Mizzou Arena (2,521); Columbia, MO
1/26/2010; 7:00 pm		at No. 15 Oklahoma State	L 60–75	11–8 (1–5)	Gallagher-Iba Arena (2,431); Stillwater, OK
1/30/2010; 5:00 pm		Kansas; Border War	L 59–61	11–9 (1–6)	Mizzou Arena (3,179); Columbia, MO
2/3/2010; 6:00 pm		at No. 10 Texas A&M	L 55–65	11–10 (1–7)	Reed Arena (3,510); College Station, TX
2/7/2010; 3:00 pm, FSN		No. 19 Iowa State	L 39–65	11–11 (1–8)	Mizzou Arena (1,392); Columbia, MO
2/10/2010; 7:00 pm, FSKC		at Kansas State	L 33–37	11–12 (1–9)	Bramlage Coliseum (3,438); Manhattan, KS
2/13/2010; 1:00 pm		at No. 4 Nebraska	L 78–82	11–13 (1–10)	Mizzou Arena (2,651); Columbia, MO
2/20/2010; 7:00 pm		at No. 12 Iowa State	L 42–55	11–14 (1–11)	Hilton Coliseum (11,212); Ames, IA
2/23/2010; 6:30 pm		at Colorado	L 79–80 ^{OT}	11–15 (1–12)	Mizzou Arena (1,784); Columbia, MO
2/27/2010; 7:05 pm		at No. 3 Nebraska	L 51–67	11–16 (1–13)	Bob Devaney Sports Center (13,595); Lincoln, NE
3/3/2010; 7:00 pm		at No. 22 Texas	L 41–60	11–17 (1–14)	Frank Erwin Center (4,576); Austin, TX
3/7/2010; 1:00 pm		at Texas Tech	W 58–55 ^{OT}	12–17 (2–14)	Mizzou Arena (2,412); Columbia, MO
Phillips 66 Big 12 Championship
3/11/2010; 1:30 pm, Metro Sports	(12)	vs. (5) No. 20 Texas; First Round	L 59–64	12–18	Municipal Auditorium; Kansas City, MO
*Non-conference game. ^{#}Rankings from AP Poll. (#) Tournament seedings in parentheses. All times are in Central Time.
