= 2009–10 Oklahoma State Cowgirls basketball team =

Intercollegiate basketball season

2009–10 Oklahoma State Cowgirls basketball

NCAA tournament, second round
- Conference: Big 12 Conference
- Record: 24–11 (9–7 Big 12)
- Head coach: Kurt Budke
- Assistant coaches: Jim Littell; Richard Henderson; Miranda Serna
- Home arena: Gallagher-Iba Arena

2009–10 Big 12 Conference women's basketball standings
	Conf.				Overall
Team	W		L	PCT	W		L	PCT
No. 4 Nebraska	16	–	0	1.000	32	–	2	.941
No. 16 Iowa State	11	–	5	.688	25	–	8	.758
No. 12 Oklahoma	11	–	5	.688	27	–	11	.711
No. 9 Texas A&M †	10	–	6	.625	26	–	8	.765
No. 17 Texas	10	–	6	.625	22	–	11	.667
No. 14 Baylor	9	–	7	.563	27	–	10	.730
No. 20 Oklahoma State	9	–	7	.563	24	–	11	.686
Texas Tech	5	–	11	.313	18	–	15	.545
Kansas State	5	–	11	.313	14	–	18	.438
Kansas	5	–	11	.313	17	–	16	.515
Colorado	3	–	13	.188	13	–	17	.433
Missouri	2	–	14	.125	12	–	18	.400
† 2010 Big 12 Tournament winner Rankings from AP poll

The 2009–10 Oklahoma State Cowgirls basketball team represented Oklahoma State University in the 2009–10 NCAA Division I women's basketball season. The Cowgirls, coached by Kurt Budke, played their home games at the Gallagher-Iba Arena in Stillwater, Oklahoma. The Cowgirls, a member of the Big 12 Conference, advanced to the NCAA tournament, losing in the second round to Georgia.

== Offseason ==
- May 20: Oklahoma State added three junior college players to its roster for the 2009-10 season. Lakyn Garrison, Carolyn Blair-Mobley and Precious Robinson all signed national letters of intent to play for the cowgirls in the upcoming season. Garrison earned second-team All-American honors from the National Junior College Athletic Association. Blair-Mobley earned third-team All-American honors by the NJCAA. Robinson earned first-team All-American honors from the NJCAA. They join six incoming players in the 2009 class for the Cowgirls, Keuna Flax, Heather Howard, Desiree Jeffries, Lindsey Keller, LaSharra Riley, and Toni Young.
- July 30: Oklahoma State senior Andrea Riley was one of 25 players named to the Women's Basketball Coaches Association's preseason "Wade Watch" list for the 2009-2010 season. She is one of three Big 12 players to make the list. Riley was one of just seven players on the list to appear for at least the second time.
- August 20: Senior guard, Andrea Riley, was named as a 2009-10 preseason candidate for the John R. Wooden Award. Riley was one of the 31 student athletes chosen for this list. She is one of only four players from the Big 12 who were on the list.
- November 18: Andrea Riley was named to the watch list for the 2009-10 Naismith Trophy. This is the third such list that Riley has appeared on this season.

== Roster ==
Number	Name	Height	Position	Class
5	Carolyn Blair-Mobley	5 ft 10 in (178 cm)	Guard	Sophomore
33	Megan Byford	6 ft 2 in (188 cm)	Center	Senior
11	Ally Clardy	5 ft 6 in (168 cm)	Guard	Senior
1	Tegan Cunningham	6 ft 1 in (185 cm)	Forward	Senior
22	Keuna Flax	5 ft 9 in (175 cm)	Guard	Freshman
00	Lakyn Garrison	5 ft 5 in (165 cm)	Guard	Junior
13	Heather Howard	6 ft 3 in (191 cm)	Forward	Freshman
32	Desiree Jeffries	5 ft 11 in (180 cm)	Guard/Forward	Freshman
25	Lindsey Keller	6 ft 2 in (188 cm)	Center	Freshman
12	Jordan Mortensen	5 ft 4 in (163 cm)	Guard	Junior
10	Andrea Riley	5 ft 5 in (165 cm)	Guard	Senior
21	LaSharra Riley	6 ft 2 in (188 cm)	Forward	Freshman
24	Precious Robinson	6 ft 0 in (183 cm)	Guard/Forward	Junior
15	Toni Young	6 ft 2 in (188 cm)	Guard/Forward	Freshman

== Schedule ==
- The Cowgirls are participating in the Preseason WNIT to be held on November 13 through November 22.
- The Cowgirls are participating in the Junkanoo Jam to be held on November 27 and 28.

=== Preseason exhibitions ===
Date	Location	Opponent	Score	Record
Nov. 10	Stillwater	Washburn	67-46	1-0

=== Regular season ===
Date	Location	Opponent	Score	Record
Nov. 13	Stillwater	Arkansas Little Rock	67-58	1-0
Nov. 15	Stillwater	Georgia Tech	70-64	2-0
Nov. 18	Albuquerque, NM	New Mexico	70-56	3-0
Nov. 22	Columbus, OH	Ohio State	72-93	3-1
Nov. 27	Freeport, Bahamas	Marist	71-69	4-1
Nov. 28	Freeport, Bahamas	Michigan State	90-93 (2OT)	4-2
Dec. 6	Stillwater	Coppin State	80-51	5-2
Dec. 13	Burlington, VT	Vermont	68-63	6-2
Dec. 17	Stillwater	UC Riverside	69-46	7-2
Dec. 19	Stillwater	Mercer	100-68	8-2
Dec. 22	Stillwater	Oral Roberts	90-65	9-2
Dec. 28	Stillwater	Western Illinois	68-55	10-2
Jan. 2	Stillwater	Texas Pan American	84-31	11-2
Jan. 4	Stillwater	Sam Houston State	98-60	12-2
Jan. 9	Stillwater	Baylor	78-65	13-2 (1-0)
Jan. 13	Lawrence, KS	Kansas	70-68	14-2 (2-0)
Jan. 16	Stillwater	Kansas State	66-56	15-2 (3-0)
Jan. 20	Austin, TX	Texas	63-77	15-3 (3-1)
Jan. 23	Boulder, CO	Colorado	74-63	16-3 (4-1)
Jan. 26	Stillwater	Missouri	75-60	17-3 (5-1)
Jan. 31	College Station, TX	Texas A&M	67-63	18-3 (6-1)
Feb. 3	Lincoln, NE	Nebraska	67-88	18-4 (6-2)
Feb. 6	Stillwater	Oklahoma	66-77	18-5 (6-3
Feb. 13	Stillwater	Texas Tech	57-65	18-6 (6-4)
Feb. 17	Stillwater	Texas A&M	52-69	18-7 (6-5)
Feb. 20	Waco, TX	Baylor	69-80	18-8 (6-6)
Feb. 24	Stillwater	Texas	73-72 (1OT)	19-8 (7-6)
Feb. 27	Lubbock, TX	Texas Tech	80-70	20-8 (8-6)
March 3	Stillwater	Iowa State	78-70	21-8 (9-6)
March 7	Norman, OK	Oklahoma	62-95	21-9 (9-7)

=== Big 12 Tournament ===
Date	Location	Opponent	Score	Record
March 11	Kansas City, MO	Kansas	76-69	22-9
March 12	Kansas City, MO	Iowa State	62-59	23-9
March 13	Kansas City, MO	Oklahoma	74-69	23-10

=== NCAA basketball tournament ===
Date	Location	Opponent	Score	Record
March 20	Tempe, AZ	Chattanooga	70-63	24-10
March 22	Tempe, AZ	Georgia	71-74 (OT)	24-11

== Player stats ==
Player	GP-GS	Min Avg	FG-FGA	FG Pct	3FG-FGA	3FG Pct	FT-FTA	FT Pct	Reb	Ast	Blk	Stl	Pts	Avg Pts
Blair-Mobley, Carolyn	32-4	11.2	6-31	.194	1-20	.050	10-17	.588	50	19	3	7	23	0.7
Byford, Megan	35-20	18.0	43-77	.558	0-0	.000	24-37	.649	154	7	30	16	110	3.1
Clardy, Ally	28-3	11.3	11-44	.250	8-33	.242	8-12	.667	18	29	1	10	38	1.4
Cunningham, Tegan	35-35	35.4	228-507	.450	68-176	.386	62-84	.738	255	30	13	46	586	16.7
Garrison, Lakyn	35-28	24.2	65-180	.361	45-132	.341	5-16	.313	65	49	1	19	180	5.1
Howard, Heather	20-0	6.0	2-16	.125	0-11	.000	1-2	.500	12	1	2	2	5	0.3
Jeffries, Desiree	14-1	5.9	5-7	.714	0-0	.000	5-10	.500	11	9	0	2	15	1.1
Keller, Lindsey	35-14	17.6	47-136	.346	9-35	.257	16-21	.762	124	17	6	23	119	3.4
Mortensen, Jordan	7-0	3.3	1-5	.200	0-3	.000	0-0	.000	3	2	1	0	2	0.3
Riley, Andrea	34-34	37.1	296-833	.355	78-262	.298	239-298	.802	114	220	3	59	909	26.7
Riley, LaSharra	26-0	6.7	11-31	.355	0-1	.000	9-18	.500	49	4	0	4	31	1.2
Robinson, Precious	35-20	22.7	99-185	.535	0-0	.000	80-112	.714	252	12	33	33	278	7.9
Young, Toni	35-16	18.2	98-188	.521	0-1	.000	50-80	.625	221	14	25	20	246	7.0

== Awards and honors ==
Oklahoma State

- Highest Associated Press ranking in school history at #10

Megan Byford

- First Team Academic All-Big 12 Women's Basketball

Ally Clardy

- First Team Academic All-Big 12 Women's Basketball

Tegan Cunningham

- Second Team All-Big 12 Women's Basketball
- Second Team Academic All-Big 12 Women's Basketball
- Preseason WNIT All-Tournament team
- Junkanoo Jam all-tournament team

Andrea Riley

- AP Second Team All-American
- First Team All-Big 12 Women's Basketball (Unanimous Selection)
- All-time leading scorer in school history
- Preseason WNIT All-Tournament team
- Junkanoo Jam all-tournament team
- Big 12 Women's Basketball Player of the week (November 16)
- Big 12 Women's Basketball Player of the week (November 30)
- Big 12 Women's Basketball Player of the week (January 11)
- Nancy Lieberman Award winner

== Players drafted into the WNBA ==
Round	Pick	Player	WNBA club
1	8	Andrea Riley	Los Angeles Sparks

== See also ==
- Oklahoma State Cowboys
- Oklahoma State Cowgirls basketball
