= 2009–10 Iowa State Cyclones women's basketball team =

Intercollegiate basketball season

2009–10 Iowa State Cyclones women's basketball

Northwestern Tournament champions

NCAA tournament, Sweet Sixteen
- Conference: Big 12 Conference
- Record: 25–8 (11–5 Big 12)
- Head coach: Bill Fennelly
- Assistant coaches: Jack Easley; Latoja Schaben; Jodi Steyer
- Home arena: Hilton Coliseum (Capacity: 14,092)

2009–10 Big 12 Conference women's basketball standings
	Conf.				Overall
Team	W		L	PCT	W		L	PCT
No. 4 Nebraska	16	–	0	1.000	32	–	2	.941
No. 16 Iowa State	11	–	5	.688	25	–	8	.758
No. 12 Oklahoma	11	–	5	.688	27	–	11	.711
No. 9 Texas A&M †	10	–	6	.625	26	–	8	.765
No. 17 Texas	10	–	6	.625	22	–	11	.667
No. 14 Baylor	9	–	7	.563	27	–	10	.730
No. 20 Oklahoma State	9	–	7	.563	24	–	11	.686
Texas Tech	5	–	11	.313	18	–	15	.545
Kansas State	5	–	11	.313	14	–	18	.438
Kansas	5	–	11	.313	17	–	16	.515
Colorado	3	–	13	.188	13	–	17	.433
Missouri	2	–	14	.125	12	–	18	.400
† 2010 Big 12 Tournament winner Rankings from AP poll

The 2009–10 Iowa State Cyclones women's basketball team represented the Iowa State University in the 2009–10 NCAA Division I women's basketball season. The Cyclones were coached by Bill Fennelly and played their home games at the Hilton Coliseum in Ames, Iowa. The Lady Clones finished second the Big 12 Conference and earned a #4 seed and a fourth consecutive trip to the NCAA women's tournament. Hilton Magic propelled the team through the first and second rounds with attendance at Hilton Coliseum ranked 2nd in the nation. However, UConn, the 2010 Champions, stopped the Lady Cyclones in the Sweet Sixteen.

== Offseason ==
- Six Iowa State women’s basketball players have graduated from the university. The players include Shellie Mosman, Jocelyn Anderson, Amanda Nisleit, Heather Ezell, Nicky Wieben, and Toccara Ross. All five senior who finished their eligibility this season in the NCAA Elite have finished their academic endeavors, and junior Shellie Mosman will graduate with a degree in accounting in just three years. The 2008–09 senior class earned three NCAA championship berths, and appeared in the Elite Eight at the 2009 NCAA Division I women's basketball tournament. The senior class won 92 games in their careers and matched the school record for most wins in a season with 27 victories.
- Chassidy Cole, a 5-8 guard from Amarillo, Texas, has signed a national letter of intent to play basketball at Iowa State in 2009–10. Bill Cole will be a sophomore for the Cyclones after spending one year at Howard College in Big Spring, Texas. Cole led Howard to a 26–9 record in 2008–09 and a top-four finish in the Western Junior College Athletic Conference, averaging eight points, 4.1 rebounds, 3.2 assists and 2.5 steals per game as a freshman. Howard was the National Junior College Athletic Association Region 5 champion and qualified for the national tournament. Cole led her region in assist-to-turnover ratio and ranked sixth in steals per game. She knocked down 33 three-pointers at a 32.4 percent clip, which ranked 14th regionally. Cole passed out five or more assists in seven contests and nabbed three or more steals 13 times.
- Other incoming players include Adrianna Prins, Amanda Zimmerman, Chelsea Poppens, and Jessica Schroll. Prins is an ESPNU HoopGurlz top 100 player from Broomfield, Colorado. At 6 foot 6 inches, she will be one of the tallest post players in the Big 12 for 2009–2010 season. Zimmerman is also a highly ranked recruit who committed to ISU while during her 8th grade year at Ballard-Huxley High School, Iowa. Zimmerman will be playing as a power forward. Poppens is a power forward from Aplington-Parkersburg High School, Iowa. Schroll is a shooting guard from H. H. Dow High School, Michigan.
- July 7: Jessica Schroll tore anterior and medial cruciate ligaments in her left knee during prime recruiting time the summer before her junior season in high school. Schroll’s knee injuries sidelined her for her entire junior campaign, but she came back to average 14.7 points, three assists and 2.7 steals per game as a senior at H.H. Dow High School in Midland, Michigan. Schroll moved to campus and started summer school on June 15, and she has spent time both on and off the court with her new teammates preparing for the upcoming season.

== Roster ==
Number	Name	Height	Position	Class
2	Williams, Whitney	5'7"	Guard	Sophomore
4	Lacey, Alison	6'0"	Guard	Senior
10	Stuckey, Denae	5'8"	Guard	Senior
11	Bolte, Kelsey	6'1"	Guard	Junior
12	Schroll, Jessica	5'10"	Guard	Freshman
13	Florzak, Anna	5'10"	Guard	Senior
22	Lightbourne, Genesis	6'0"	Forward	Senior
23	Cole, Chassidy	5'8"	Guard	Sophomore
30	Mosman, Shellie	5'10"	Guard	Senior
33	Poppens, Chelsea	6'2"	Power Forward	Freshman
42	Zimmerman, Amanda	6'2"	Power Forward	Freshman
55	Prins, Adrianna	6'6"	Post	Freshman

== Schedule ==
Date time, TV	Rank^{#}	Opponent^{#}	Result	Record	Site (attendance) city, state
Pre-Season (Exhibition)
November 1; 2:00 pm		Dubuque	W 99–57		Hilton Coliseum (9,552); Ames, IA
November 8; 2:00 pm		Minnesota Crookston	W 98–37		Hilton Coliseum (9,685); Ames, IA
Regular season
November 15*; 1:00 pm	No. 24	Florida Atlantic	W 80–40	1–0	Hilton Coliseum (9,922); Ames, IA
November 22*; 2:05 pm	No. 24	at Drake	L 75–78	1–1	Knapp Center (3,112); Des Moines, Iowa
November 27*; 3:00 pm		vs. Penn; Northwestern Tournament	W 78–38	2–1	(N/A); Evanston, Illinois
November 28*; 2:00 pm		vs. College of Charleston; Northwestern Tournament	W 68–50	3–1	(N/A); Evanston, IL
December 1*; 7:00 pm		Mississippi Valley State	W 83–44	4–1	Hilton Coliseum (9,646); Ames, IA
December 6*; 12:00 pm		Arkansas–Pine Bluff	W 80–64	5–1	Hilton Coliseum (9,893); Ames, IA
December 10*; 7:00 pm, Mediacom		Iowa; Cy-Hawk Series	W 85–66	6–1	Hilton Coliseum (12,244); Ames, IA
December 13*; 12:00 pm, Big Ten Network		at Minnesota	W 77–60	7–1	(4,376); Minneapolis, Minnesota
December 20*; 6:00 pm, Mediacom		Northern Iowa	W 76–51	8–1	Hilton Coliseum (N/A); Ames, IA
December 29*; 7:30 pm		North Carolina A&T; Cyclone Challenge	W 66–62	9–1	Hilton Coliseum (N/A); Ames, IA
December 30*; 7:30 pm		Fairfield; Cyclone Challenge	W 67–37	10–1	Hilton Coliseum (N/A); Ames, IA
January 3*; 6:00 pm		Lafayette	W 67–25	11–1	Hilton Coliseum (N/A); Ames, IA
January 5*; 7:00 pm, Mediacom		South Dakota	W 68–43	12–1	Hilton Coliseum (6,899); Ames, IA
January 9; 7:00 pm		No. 13 Nebraska	L 49–57	12–2 (0–1)	Hilton Coliseum (9,066); Ames, IA
January 13; 7:00 pm		at No. 8 Texas A&M	L 44–68	12–3 (0–2)	(5,766); College Station, TX
January 16; 5:30 pm, Fox Sports Net		at Colorado	W 68–62	13–3 (1–2)	(4,198); Boulder, CO
January 20; 7:00 pm, Fox Sports Net		Kansas	W 53–42	14–3 (2–2)	Hilton Coliseum (9,798); Ames, IA
January 23; 1:00 pm		at No. 20 Texas	W 73–71 ^{OT}	15–3 (3–2)	(4,800); Austin, TX
January 27; 1:00 pm	No. 22	No. 11 Oklahoma	W 63–56	16–3 (4–2)	Hilton Coliseum (10,121); Ames, IA
January 31; 2:00 pm	No. 22	at Kansas State	L 67–73	16–4 (4–3)	(4,925); Manhattan, KS
February 3; 7:00 pm	No. 22	Texas Tech	W 63–48	17–4 (5–3)	Hilton Coliseum (10,059); Ames, IA
February 7; 3:00 pm, Fox Sports Net	No. 22	at Missouri	W 65–39	18–4 (6–3)	(1,392); Columbia, MO
February 13; 11:00 am, Fox Sports Net	No. 20	No. 11 Baylor	W 69–45	19–4 (7–3)	Hilton Coliseum (11,210); Ames, IA
February 17; 7:00 pm	No. 13	at No. 3 Nebraska	L 40–50	19–5 (7–4)	(10,988); Lincoln, NE
February 20; 7:00 pm	No. 13	Missouri	W 55–42	20–5 (8–4)	Hilton Coliseum (11,212); Ames, IA
February 25; 6:00 pm, Fox Sports Net	No. 15	at Kansas	W 57–54	21–5 (9–4)	(3,281); Lawrence, KS
February 27; 7:00 pm, Mediacom	No. 15	Kansas State	W 48–39	22–5 (10–4)	Hilton Coliseum (12,015); Ames, IA
March 3; 7:00 pm	No. 13	at No. 20 Oklahoma State	L 70–78	22–6 (10–5)	(2,563); Stillwater, OK
March 6; 2:00 pm	No. 13	Colorado	W 59–41	23–6 (11–5)	Hilton Coliseum (11,946); Ames, IA
Big 12 Tournament
March 12*; 5:00 pm, Fox Sports Net	No. 14	at No. 21 Oklahoma State; Big 12 Tournament Quarterfinals	L 59–62	23–7 (11–5)	Municipal Auditorium (N/A); Kansas City, MO
NCAA Division I Tournament
March 21*; ESPN 2	No. 16	Lehigh; NCAA Tournament First Round	W 79–42	24–7 (11–5)	Hilton Coliseum (6,738); Ames, IA
March 23*; ESPN 2	No. 16	Green Bay; NCAA Tournament Second Round	W 60–56	25–7 (11–5)	Hilton Coliseum (6,498); Ames, IA
March 23*; ESPN	No. 16	at No. 1 Connecticut; NCAA Tournament Sweet Sixteen	L 36–74	25–8 (11–5)	(5,285); Dayton, OH
*Non-conference game. ^{#}Rankings from AP Poll. (#) Tournament seedings in parentheses. All times are in Central Time.

== Regular season ==
=== Player stats ===
Player	Field goals	Three Pointers	Free Throws	Assists	Steals	Rebounds	Points
Lacey	163–369 .442	53–142 .373	94–107 .879	187	39	148–4.9	473–15.8
Bolte	136–348 .391	84–205 .410	37–42 .881	48	38	144–4.5	393–12.3
Prins	99–223 .444	27–67 .403	42–54 .778	14	3	113–4.2	167–9.9
Poppens	111–227 .489	0–1 .000	69–110 .627	22	19	238–7.2	291–8.8
Williams	63–157 .401	48–120 .400	20–23 .870	52	17	34–1.0	194–5.9
Zimmerman	58–113 .513	15–36 .417	25–37 .676	18	2	72–2.3	156–5.0
Stuckey	47–127 .370	15–46 .326	34–54 .630	68	41	200–6.1	143–4.3
Schroll	42–93 .452	2–12 .167	43–61 .705	17	7	110–3.3	129–3.9
Cole	18–50 .360	11–33 .333	15–27 .556	33	8	46–1.5	62–2.0
Mosman	6–19 .316	4–17 .235	5–8 .625	7	2	14–0.9	21–1.3
Florzak	3–9 .333	2–8 .250	8–8 1.000	0	3	7–0.5	16–1.1
Lightbourne	5–18 .278	0–0 .000	2–3 .667	3	1	17–1.1	12–0.8
Totals	751–1753 .428	261–687 .380	394–534 .738	469	180	1253–38.0	2157–65.4

== Team players drafted into the WNBA ==
Round	Pick	Player	NBA club
1st	10	Alison Lacey	Seattle Storm
