= 2009–10 Oklahoma Sooners women's basketball team =

Intercollegiate basketball season

2009–10 Oklahoma Sooners women's basketball

NCAA tournament, final Four
- Conference: Big 12 Conference
- South
- Record: 27–11 (11–5 Big 12)
- Head coach: Sherri Coale
- Assistant coaches: Stacy Hansmeyer; Jan Ross; Chad Thrailkill
- Home arena: Lloyd Noble Center

The 2009–10 Oklahoma Sooners women's basketball team represented the University of Oklahoma in the 2009–10 NCAA Division I basketball season. The Sooners, coached by Sherri Coale and members of the Big 12 Conference, made the Final Four of the NCAA tournament for the second consecutive season, losing in the national semifinals to Stanford. Their Final Four appearance was unexpected entering the season, as they had suffered seemingly devastating graduation losses from last year's team, most notably All-American Courtney Paris and her twin sister Ashley.

2009–10 Big 12 Conference women's basketball standings
	Conf.				Overall
Team	W		L	PCT	W		L	PCT
No. 4 Nebraska	16	–	0	1.000	32	–	2	.941
No. 16 Iowa State	11	–	5	.688	25	–	8	.758
No. 12 Oklahoma	11	–	5	.688	27	–	11	.711
No. 9 Texas A&M †	10	–	6	.625	26	–	8	.765
No. 17 Texas	10	–	6	.625	22	–	11	.667
No. 14 Baylor	9	–	7	.563	27	–	10	.730
No. 20 Oklahoma State	9	–	7	.563	24	–	11	.686
Texas Tech	5	–	11	.313	18	–	15	.545
Kansas State	5	–	11	.313	14	–	18	.438
Kansas	5	–	11	.313	17	–	16	.515
Colorado	3	–	13	.188	13	–	17	.433
Missouri	2	–	14	.125	12	–	18	.400
† 2010 Big 12 Tournament winner Rankings from AP poll

== Offseason ==
- April 30: Ashley Paris was among the finalists named for the 2009 Arthur Ashe Jr. Sports Scholar Award.
- May 4: The Sooners will participate in the 2009 US Virgin Islands Paradise Jam at University of Virgin Islands. The event is celebrating its tenth anniversary. Games will be played at the U.V.I. Sports and Fitness Center, a basketball facility located in Charlotte Amalie, St. Thomas.
- May 17: Oklahoma's Whitney Hand and Danielle Robinson were among the 14 finalists announced to compete for a spot on the 12-member USA World University Games team.
- July 2: Oklahoma’s Danielle Robinson supplied five points in Team USA’s 93–59 victory of Great Britain in the second round of pool play at the 2009 World University Games.
- July 30: The Women's Basketball Coaches Association (WBCA), on behalf of the Wade Coalition, announced the 2009–10 preseason "Wade Watch" list for The State Farm Wade Trophy Division I Player of the Year. Oklahoma’s Danielle Robinson has been named to the 2009-10 preseason "Wade Watch" list, which is made up of top NCAA Division I student-athletes who best embody the spirit of Lily Margaret Wade. This is based on the following criteria: game and season statistics, leadership, character, effect on their team and overall playing ability.
- August 21: The 2009-10 preseason candidates list for the Women’s Wooden Award was released, naming 31 student athletes. Danielle Robinson from Oklahoma was one of the candidates.

== Preseason ==
Date	Location	Opponent	Sooners points	Opp. points	Record
Nov. 4	Norman	Rogers State	94	53	1-0
Nov. 10	Norman	Oklahoma Christian	109	55	2-0

== Regular season ==
=== Roster ===
2009–10 Oklahoma Sooners women's basketball team
Players
Coaches

Pos.	#	Name	Height	Year	Hometown
G/F	1	Nyeshia Stevenson	5 ft 10 in (1.78 m)	—	Sr	Little Rock, Arkansas
F	10	Carlee Roethlisberger	6 ft 1 in (1.85 m)	—	Jr	Findlay, Ohio
G	13	Danielle Robinson	5 ft 9 in (1.75 m)	—	Jr	San Jose, California
G	14	Lauren Willis	5 ft 11 in (1.8 m)	—	Jr	Overland Park, Kansas
F	21	Amanda Thompson	6 ft 1 in (1.85 m)	—	Sr	Chicago, Illinois
G	25	Whitney Hand	6 ft 1 in (1.85 m)	—	So	Fort Worth, Texas
G	31	Kodi Morrison	5 ft 8 in (1.73 m)	—	Fr	Seminole, Oklahoma
C	34	Abi Olajuwon	6 ft 4 in (1.93 m)	—	Sr	Los Angeles, California
F	44	Lyndsey Cloman	6 ft 3 in (1.91 m)	—	Fr	San Antonio, Texas
G	45	Jasmine Hartman	5 ft 10 in (1.78 m)	—	So	Houston, Texas
F	53	Joanna McFarland	6 ft 3 in (1.91 m)	—	Fr	Derby, Kansas

Head coach

- Sherri Coale (Oklahoma Christian)

Assistant coach(es)

- Jan Ross (Oklahoma Christian)
- Stacy Hansmeyer (Connecticut)
- Chad Thrailkill (Southern Nazarene)

Legend

- (C) Team captain
- (S) Suspended
- (I) Ineligible
- (W) Walk-on
- Injured
- Current redshirt

Roster

=== Schedule ===
Date	Location	Opponent	Sooners points	Opp. points	Record
Nov. 13	Norman	Mercer	108	66	1–0
Nov. 15	Athens, Georgia	Georgia	51	62	1–1
Nov. 21	Norman	Texas Christian	74	70	2–1
Dec. 2	Norman	UT Arlington	100	67	3-1
Dec. 5	Norman	Arkansas	87	86	4-1
Dec. 9	Poughkeepsie	Marist	80	71	5-1
Dec.10	West Point	Army	59	46	6-1
Dec. 20	Omaha	Creighton	67	58	7-1
Dec. 30	Norman	Cal State Fullerton	95	76	8-1
Jan. 3	Knoxville	Tennessee	75	96	8-2
Jan. 9	Norman	Texas Tech	73	58	9-2
Jan. 13	Waco	Baylor	47	57	9-3
Jan.17	Norman	Texas A&M	74	65	10-3
Jan.20	Columbia, MO	Missouri	62	61	11-3
Jan.23	Norman	Kansas	81	69	12-3
Jan.27	Ames, Iowa	Iowa State	56	63	12-4
Jan.30	Lubbock	Texas Tech	70	66	13-4
Feb. 3	Norman	Texas	57	75	13-5
Feb. 6	Stillwater	Oklahoma State	77	66	14-5
Feb. 10	Norman	Baylor	62	60	15-5
Feb. 13	Norman	Colorado	65	55	16-5
Feb. 15	Norman	Connecticut	60	76	16-6
Feb. 20	Manhattan, KS	Kansas State	64	58	17-6
Feb. 24	Norman	Nebraska	64	80	17-7
Feb. 27	Austin	Texas	75	60	18-7
March 2	College Station, Texas	Texas A&M	55	78	18-8
March 7	Norman	Oklahoma State	95	62	19-8

==== Paradise Jam ====
Date	Time	Visiting team	Home team	Score	Leading Scorer	Leading Rebounder
Nov. 26	2:00 PM	South Carolina	Oklahoma	OK, 75-67	Bone (SC), 18	Stephens (SC), 10
Nov. 27	4:30 PM	Oklahoma	San Diego State	OK, 87-48	Thompson (OK), 18	Thompson (OK), 9
Nov. 28	4:30 PM	Oklahoma	Notre Dame	ND, 81-71	Robinson (OK), 26	Olajuwon (OK), 7, Bruszewski (ND) 7, Mallory (ND) 7

== Player stats ==
Player	Games played	Minutes	Field goals	Three pointers	Free throws	Rebounds	Assists	Blocks	Steals	Points

== Team players drafted into the WNBA ==
Round	Pick	Player	WNBA club
2	19	Amanda Thompson	Tulsa Shock
3	28	Abi Olajuwon	Chicago Sky
3	36	Nyeshia Stevenson	Phoenix Mercury
