= 2009–10 Baylor Lady Bears basketball team =

Intercollegiate basketball season

2009–10 Baylor Lady Bears basketball

Maggie Dixon Classic champions Las Vegas Hoops Classic champions World Vision Classic champions

NCAA tournament, Final Four
- Conference: Big 12 Conference

Ranking
- Coaches: No. 4
- Record: 27–10 (9–7 Big 12)
- Head coach: Kim Mulkey
- Assistant coaches: Bill Brock; Leon Barmore; Damion McKinney

2009–10 Big 12 Conference women's basketball standings
	Conf.				Overall
Team	W		L	PCT	W		L	PCT
No. 4 Nebraska	16	–	0	1.000	32	–	2	.941
No. 16 Iowa State	11	–	5	.688	25	–	8	.758
No. 12 Oklahoma	11	–	5	.688	27	–	11	.711
No. 9 Texas A&M †	10	–	6	.625	26	–	8	.765
No. 17 Texas	10	–	6	.625	22	–	11	.667
No. 14 Baylor	9	–	7	.563	27	–	10	.730
No. 20 Oklahoma State	9	–	7	.563	24	–	11	.686
Texas Tech	5	–	11	.313	18	–	15	.545
Kansas State	5	–	11	.313	14	–	18	.438
Kansas	5	–	11	.313	17	–	16	.515
Colorado	3	–	13	.188	13	–	17	.433
Missouri	2	–	14	.125	12	–	18	.400
† 2010 Big 12 Tournament winner Rankings from AP poll

The 2009–10 Baylor Lady Bears women's basketball team were coached by Kim Mulkey. The Bears were a member of the Big 12 Conference and participated in the Final Four.

== Offseason ==
- April 2: The 2009 Women's Basketball Coaches Association (WBCA) High School All-America Game presented by Nike will be televised on ESPNU. Baylor Lady Bear signees Brittney Griner and Mariah Chandler are two of the 20 players selected to participate in the All-Star game.
- April 7: The future stars of women’s basketball played in Saint Louis in the 2009 Women's Basketball Coaches Association (WBCA) High School All-America Game presented by Nike. State Farm/WBCA High School Player of the Year and Baylor signee Brittney Griner earned Blue Team MVP honors. She scored 20 points (9-of-15), nine rebounds, eight blocks and three steals.
- April 9: Baylor guard/forward Jessica Morrow was selected as the 27th overall pick in the 2009 WNBA draft. She became the program's seventh WNBA draftee. Morrow's selection marked the fifth straight season a Baylor player was taken in the WNBA Draft.
- April 14: The Baylor Lady Bear basketball program signed Brooklyn Pope, a 6-1 forward/guard, to a Letter of Athletic Aid. Pope is a transfer from the Rutgers University, intends to begin classes at Baylor in June. Pope will sit out the 2009-10 season in order to comply with NCAA transfer rules; she will have three seasons of eligibility beginning with the 2010-11 season but is eligible to practice with the Lady Bears next year. As a freshman for the Scarlet Knight, Pope appeared in 29 of the team's 34 games and logged one start. The 6-1 forward/guard averaged 2.1 points, 2.0 rebounds and 6.0 minutes a game in 2008-09.
- April 29: Sophomore Whitney Zachariason has been named to the Academic All-Big 12 first-team it was recently announced by the league office. Zachariason, a general studies major from Little Rock, Ark., maintains a 3.3 GPA.

== Preseason ==
Date	Location	Opponent	Bears points	Opp. points	Record
Nov. 3	Waco, Texas	St. Edwards	97	43	1-0
Nov. 7	Waco, Texas	Incarnate Word	81	52	2-0

== Regular season ==
Brittney Griner set numerous NCAA Division I, Big 12 Conference and Baylor records. She set a new single-season block mark with 218 and broke the NCAA Tournament blocked shot record, rejecting 35 through four tournament games.

=== Roster ===
Number	Name	Height	Position	Class
1	Kimetria Hayden	5-11	Guard	Freshman
2	Cherrish Wallace	5-6	Guard	Sophomore
3	Jordan Madden	6-0	Guard	Freshman
4	Whitney Zachariason	6-2	Forward	Junior
5	Melissa Jones	5-10	Guard	Junior
15	Shanay Washington	6-1	Guard	Freshman
20	Terran Condrey	5-7	Guard	Sophomore
21	Kelli Griffin	5-8	Guard	Junior
24	Ashley Field	6-2	Center	Sophomore
25	Lindsay Palmer	5-10	Guard	Sophomore
32	Brooklyn Pope	6-1	Forward/Guard	Redshirt Sophomore
42	Brittney Griner	6-8	Center	Freshman
44	Mariah Chandler	6-2	Forward	Freshman
55	Morghan Medlock	6-1	Forward	Senior

=== Schedule ===
- The Bears will participate in four notable events. On November 15, Baylor will play Tennessee in the State Farm Tip-Off Classic. From November 27 to December 5, Baylor will participate in the World Vision Classic. The Maggie Dixon Classic at Madison Square Garden involved Baylor and Boston College on December 13. Baylor would make its first appearance at MSG. From December 19 to December 20, the Bears will participate in the Las Vegas Hoops Classic.

Date time, TV	Rank^{#}	Opponent^{#}	Result	Record	Site (attendance) city, state
Regular season
2009/11/15*; 4:02 p.m., ESPN2	No. 7	at No. 8 Tennessee; State Farm Tip-Off Classic	L 65-74	0-1 (0-0)	Thompson-Boling Arena (12,824); Knoxville, Tennessee
2009/11/17*; 7:00 p.m.	No. 7	Tennessee Tech	W 100-55	1-1 (0-0)	Ferrell Center (6,266); Waco, Texas
2009/11/22*; 4:06 p.m., Fox Sports Net	No. 8	at No. 17 California	W 69-49	2-1 (0-0)	Haas Pavilion (2,361); Berkeley, California
2009/11/24*; 7:00 p.m.	No. 8	Jacksonville State	W 104-45	3-1 (0-0)	Ferrell Center (6,127); Waco, Texas
2009/11/27*; 7:00 p.m.	No. 8	Idaho; World Vision Classic	W 82-37	4-1 (0-0)	Ferrell Center (6,451); Waco, Texas
2009/11/28*; 12:00 p.m.	No. 8	Louisiana-Lafayette; World Vision Classic	W 89-42	5-1 (0-0)	Ferrell Center (6,177); Waco, Texas
2009/11/29*; 2:30 p.m.	No. 8	Lamar; World Vision Classic	W 87-65	6-1 (0-0)	Ferrell Center (6,006); Waco, Texas
2009/12/05*; 5:05 p.m., FSSouthwest	No. 8	Louisiana Tech	W 77-67	7-1 (0-0)	Ferrell Center (6,582); Waco, Texas
2009/12/13*; 12:00 p.m., ESPNU	No. 6	vs. Boston College; Maggie Dixon Classic	W 68-55	8-1 (0-0)	Madison Square Garden (7,190); New York City, New York
2009/12/16*; 7:00 p.m.	No. 6	Oral Roberts	W 101-76	9-1 (0-0)	Ferrell Center (6,282); Waco, Texas
2009/12/19*; 10:45 p.m.	No. 6	vs. Gonzaga; Holiday Hoops Classic	W 70-49	10-1 (0-0)	South Point Arena (516); Las Vegas, Nevada
2009/12/20*; 8:30 p.m.	No. 6	vs. No. 14 Arizona State; Holiday Hoops Classic	W 70-66	11-1 (0-0)	South Point Arena (722); Las Vegas, Nevada
2009/12/30*; 7:00 p.m.	No. 5	Texas–Pan American	W 100-46	12-1 (0-0)	Ferrell Center (6,713); Waco, Texas
2010/01/02*; 7:00 p.m.	No. 5	Texas State	W 99-18	13-1 (0-0)	Ferrell Center (6,669); Waco, Texas
2010/01/09; 2:30 p.m., CSN	No. 5	at Oklahoma State	L 65-78	13-2 (0-1)	Gallagher-Iba Arena (3717); Stillwater, Oklahoma
2010/01/13; 7:00 p.m., ESPN Fullcourt	No. 9	Oklahoma	W 57-47	14-2 (1-1)	Ferrell Center (7718); Waco, Texas
2010/01/17; 2:30 p.m., Fox Sports Net		Nebraska	L 56-65	14-3 (1-2)	Ferrell Center (7883); Waco, Texas
2010/01/23; 1:00 p.m.		at Missouri	L 62-70	14-4 (1-3)	Mizzou Arena (2521); Columbia, Missouri
2010/01/27; 7:00 p.m.		Texas A&M	W 61-53	15-4 (2-3)	Ferrell Center (8702); Waco, Texas
2010/01/31; 4:00 p.m., ESPN2		at Texas	L 50-61	15-5 (2-4)	Frank Erwin Center (9123); Austin, Texas
2010/02/03; 7:00 p.m.		at Kansas State	W 65-47	16-5 (3-4)	Bramlage Coliseum (3893); Manhattan, Kansas
2010/02/06; 7:30 p.m.		Colorado	W 76-42	17-5 (4-4)	Ferrell Center (7350); Waco, Texas
2010/02/10; 7:00 p.m.		at Oklahoma	L 60-62	17-6 (4-5)	Lloyd Noble Center (8493); Norman, Oklahoma
2010/02/13; 11:00 a.m., Fox Sports Net		at Iowa State	L 45-69	17-7 (4-6)	Hilton Coliseum (11210); Ames, Iowa
2010/02/17; 7:00 p.m.		Texas Tech	W 65-48	18-7 (5-6)	Ferrell Center (7009); Waco, Texas
2010/02/20; 7:00 p.m.		Oklahoma State	W 80-69	19-7 (6-6)	Ferrell Center (8282); Waco, Texas
2010/02/22; 8:00 p.m., ESPN2		at Texas A&M	W 65-63	20-7 (7-6)	Reed Arena (7233); College Station, Texas
2010/02/28; 4:00 p.m., ESPN2		Kansas	W 70-47	21-7 (8-6)	Ferrell Center (8575); Waco, Texas
2010/03/03; 7:00 p.m.		at Texas Tech	W 69-60	22-7 (9-6)	United Spirit Arena (7602); Lubbock, Texas
2010/03/07; 2:30 p.m., Fox Sports Net		Texas	L 54-70	22-8 (9-7)	Ferrell Center (9758); Waco, Texas
Big 12 Tournament
2010/03/11; 7:30 p.m., Fox Sports Net		Colorado	W 72-65	23-8 (9-7)	Municipal Auditorium (4663); Kansas City Missouri
2010/03/12; 7:30 p.m., Fox Sports Net		Oklahoma	L 54-59	23-9 (9-7)	Municipal Auditorium (4239); Kansas City Missouri
2010 NCAA tournament
2010/03/20; 9:50 p.m., ESPN2		Fresno State	W 69-55	24-9 (9-7)	Haas Pavilion (2,572); Berkeley, California
2010/03/22; 9:05 p.m., ESPN2		Georgetown	W 49-33	25-9 (9-7)	Haas Pavilion (1497); Berkeley, California
2010/03/27; 11:04 p.m., ESPN2		Tennessee	W 77-62	26-9 (9-7)	FedEx Forum (6577); Memphis, Tennessee
2010/03/29; 6:04 p.m., ESPN2		Duke	W 51-48	27-9 (9-7)	FedEx Forum (3263); Memphis, Tennessee
2010/04/04; 8:30 p.m., ESPN		No. 1 Connecticut	L 50-70	27-10 (9-7)	Alamodome (25,817); San Antonio, Texas
*Non-conference game. ^{#}Rankings from AP Poll. (#) Tournament seedings in parentheses. All times are in Central Time.

== Player stats ==
Player	Games played	Minutes	Field goals	Three pointers	Free throws	Rebounds	Assists	Blocks	Steals	Points
Brittney Griner	35	1174	232	0	180	297	35	223	18	644

== Postseason ==
=== NCAA basketball tournament ===
The Lady Bears advanced to the Women's Final Four by defeating Duke 51-48. In that game, Griner set a new NCAA Woman's tournament record by getting her 31st block, breaking the old record set by Alison Bales of Duke in 2006. She currently has 35 blocks.

== Awards and honors ==
- Lindsay Palmer, Elite 88 award
- Brittney Griner, Associated Press Second Team All-American
- Brittney Griner, National Freshman of the Year
- Brittney Griner, Memphis Regional's Most Outstanding Player
- Brittney Griner, WBCA/State Farm All-Region 5 team
- Brittney Griner, Big 12 Conference's Freshman of the Year
- Brittney Griner, Co-Defensive Player of the Year
- Brittney Griner, All-Big 12 first team
- Brittney Griner, All-Big 12 All-Defensive team
- Brittney Griner, All-Big 12 All-Freshman team.

== Team players drafted into the WNBA ==
Round	Pick	Player	WNBA club

== See also ==
- 2009–10 NCAA Division I women's basketball season
