= 2009–10 Kansas Jayhawks women's basketball team =

Intercollegiate basketball season

2009–10 Kansas Jayhawks women's basketball
- Conference: Big Twelve
- Head coach: Bonnie Henrickson
- Assistant coaches: Karen Lange; Katie O’Connor; Tamika Raymond

2009–10 Big 12 Conference women's basketball standings
	Conf.				Overall
Team	W		L	PCT	W		L	PCT
No. 4 Nebraska	16	–	0	1.000	32	–	2	.941
No. 16 Iowa State	11	–	5	.688	25	–	8	.758
No. 12 Oklahoma	11	–	5	.688	27	–	11	.711
No. 9 Texas A&M †	10	–	6	.625	26	–	8	.765
No. 17 Texas	10	–	6	.625	22	–	11	.667
No. 14 Baylor	9	–	7	.563	27	–	10	.730
No. 20 Oklahoma State	9	–	7	.563	24	–	11	.686
Texas Tech	5	–	11	.313	18	–	15	.545
Kansas State	5	–	11	.313	14	–	18	.438
Kansas	5	–	11	.313	17	–	16	.515
Colorado	3	–	13	.188	13	–	17	.433
Missouri	2	–	14	.125	12	–	18	.400
† 2010 Big 12 Tournament winner Rankings from AP poll

The 2009–10 Kansas Jayhawks women's basketball team represented the University of Kansas in the 2009–10 NCAA Division I women's basketball season. The Jayhawks were a member of the Big 12. Kansas returned four starters and eight letter winners to the line-up, including All-American guard-forward Danielle McCray. The Jayhawks added seven newcomers to the 2009-10 team, led by redshirt freshman Angel Goodrich, who sat out the entire 2008-09 season after suffering a knee injury.

== Offseason ==
- July 15: Kansas basketball players Tyshawn Taylor (men’s team) and Danielle McCray (women’s team) each earned a gold medal this month after winning championships in their respective tournaments. McCray helped lead her team to win the USA Women's World University Games in Belgrade, Serbia. McCray was the second leading scorer on Team USA shooting 56.7 percent.
- July 30: The Women's Basketball Coaches Association (WBCA), on behalf of the Wade Coalition, announced the 2009-2010 preseason "Wade Watch" list for The State Farm Wade Trophy Division I Player of the Year. Kansas player Danielle McCray has been named to the 2009-10 preseason "Wade Watch" list, which is made up of top NCAA Division I student-athletes who best embody the spirit of Lily Margaret Wade. This is based on the following criteria: game and season statistics, leadership, character, effect on their team and overall playing ability.
- August 21: The 2009-10 preseason candidates list for the Women’s Wooden Award was released, naming 31 student athletes. Danielle McCray from Kansas was one of the candidates.

== Exhibition ==
Date	Location	Opponent	Score	Record
Nov. 1	Allen Fieldhouse	Pittsburg State	86-56	1-0
Nov. 8	Allen Fieldhouse	Emporia State	85-48	2-0

== Regular season ==
- Nov 18: Senior All-American Danielle McCray was one of 50 players named to the Naismith Trophy Preseason Watch List announced by the Atlanta Tipoff Club.
- Nov 22: Senior Sade Morris scored a career-high 26 points. She also became the 21st player in Kansas women's basketball history to join the 1,000-point club.

=== Roster ===
Number	Name	Height	Position	Class
00	LaChelda Jacobs	5-10	Guard	Senior
1	Aishah Sutherland	6-2	Forward	Sophomore
2	Kelly Kohn	5-9	Guard	Senior
3	Rhea Codio	5-5	Guard	Junior
4	Danielle McCray	5-11	Guard/Forward	Senior
10	Tania Jackson	6-2	Forward	Freshman
13	Monica Engelman	5-11	Guard	Freshman
14	Krysten Boogaard	6-5	Center	Junior
20	Sade Morris	5-11	Guard	Senior
21	Carolyn Davis	6-3	Forward	Freshman
22	Marisha Brown	5-9	Guard	Junior
23	Angel Goodrich	5-4	Guard	Redshirt Freshman
24	Nicolette Smith	6-2	Forward	Junior
32	Annette Davis	6-1	Forward	Freshman
34	Porscha Weddington	6-1	Forward	Senior

=== Schedule ===
- The Jayhawks, who reached the 2009 WNIT championship game after playing one of the toughest schedules in the country, will also face five non-conference foes who reached postseason play in 2009.
- The Jayhawks will compete in the 2009 Junkanoo Jam on Grand Bahama Island Nov. 26-28. Kansas will face Xavier in the opening round on Thanksgiving Day (Thursday, Nov. 26), and will play either Minnesota or TCU Saturday, Nov. 28.
- The Sunflower Showdown will resume on January 9.

Date	Location	Opponent	Score	Leading Scorer (KU)	Record
Nov. 15	Lawrence, KS	Oral Roberts	106-80 (W)	D. McCray (27)	1-0
Nov. 18	Iowa City, IA	Iowa	66-55 (W)	D. McCray (20)	2-0
Nov. 22	Lawrence, KS	Michigan	77-66 (W)	S. Morris (26)	3-0
Nov. 26	Grand Bahama Island	Xavier	71-76 (L)	D. McCray (23)	3-1
Nov. 28	Grand Bahama Island	Texas Christian	69-74 (L)	K. Boogaard (21)	3-2
Dec. 3	Lawrence, KS	UCLA	54-49 (W)	D. McCray (15)	4-2
Dec. 6	Lawrence, KS	Northern Colorado	81-54 (W)	D. McCray (25)	5-2
Dec. 10	Lawrence, KS	UMKC	81-53 (W)	K. Boogaard (19)	6-2
Dec. 13	Lawrence, KS	Creighton	77-56 (W)	A. Goodrich (20)	7-2
Dec. 20	Lawrence, KS	UC Riverside	75-60 (W)	D. McCray (30)	8-2
Dec. 22	Houston, TX	@ Houston	89-69 (W)	D. McCray (37)	9-2
Dec. 30	Lawrence, KS	Pepperdine	82-63 (W)	S. Morris (22)	10-2
Jan. 3	Las Cruces, NM	@ New Mexico State	60-61 (L)	D. McCray (16)	10-3
Jan. 9	Manhattan, KS	@ Kansas State	35-59 (L)	A. Sutherland (12)	10-4
Jan. 13	Lawrence, KS	Oklahoma State	68-70 (L)	D. McCray (28)	10-5
Jan. 17	Lawrence, KS	Missouri	72-59 (W)	D. McCray (26)	11-5
Jan. 20	Ames, IA	@ Iowa State	42-53 (L)	S. Morris (16)	11-6
Jan. 23	Norman, OK	@ Oklahoma	69-81 (L)	S. Morris (17)	11-7
Jan. 27	Lawrence, KS	Colorado	75-64 (W)	D. McCray (29)	12-7
Jan. 30	Columbia, MO	@ Missouri	61-59 (W)	C. Davis (20)	13-7
Feb. 7	Lawrence, KS	Kansas State	70-60 (W)	M. Engelman (16)	14-7
Feb. 10	Lawrence, KS	Nebraska	60-67 (L)	C. Davis (17)	14-8
Feb. 13	Lawrence, KS	Texas	82-85 (2OT) (L)	C. Davis (29)	14-9
Feb. 16	Boulder, CO	@ Colorado	79-72 (W)	C. Davis (28)	15-9
Feb. 20	Lawrence, KS	Texas Tech	51-68 (L)	M. Engelman (18)	15-10
Feb. 24	Lawrence, KS	Iowa State	54-57 (L)	C. Davis (17)	15-11
Feb. 28	Waco, TX	@ Baylor	47-70 (L)	C. Davis (15)	15-12
March 3	Lincoln, NE	@ Nebraska	52-77 (L)	M. Engelman/A. Davis (9)	15-13
March 6	Lawrence, KS	Texas A&M	54-78 (L)	A. Sutherland (13)	15-14

==== Big 12 Tournament ====
Date	Location	Opponent	Score	Leading scorer (KU)	Record
March 11	Kansas City, MO	Oklahoma State	69-76 (L)	C. Davis (31)	15-15

== Postseason ==
=== Women's National Invitation Tournament (WNIT) ===
Date	Location	Opponent	Score	Leading scorer (KU)	Record
March 17 (1st round)	Lawrence, KS	Prairie View A&M	82-70 (W)	K. Boogaard (37)	16-15
March 21 (2nd round)	Lawrence, KS	Creighton	71-68 (W)	C. Davis (25)	17-15
March 25 (Sweet Sixteen)	Normal, IL	Illinois State	51-71 (L)	M. Engelman (14)	17-16

== See also ==
- 2009–10 Kansas Jayhawks men's basketball team
