= 2009–10 Nebraska Cornhuskers women's basketball team =

Intercollegiate basketball season

2009–10 Nebraska Cornhuskers women's basketball

Saint Mary's Hilton Tournament champions Big 12 Conference regular-season champion

2010 NCAA tournament, Sweet Sixteen
- Conference: Big 12
- North

Ranking
- Coaches: No. 4
- AP: No. 4
- Record: 32–2 (16–0 Big-12)
- Head coach: Connie Yori
- Assistant coaches: Sunny Smallwood; Kellie Lewis-Jay; Tony Verdi
- Home arena: Devaney Sports Center

2009–10 Big 12 Conference women's basketball standings
	Conf.				Overall
Team	W		L	PCT	W		L	PCT
No. 4 Nebraska	16	–	0	1.000	32	–	2	.941
No. 16 Iowa State	11	–	5	.688	25	–	8	.758
No. 12 Oklahoma	11	–	5	.688	27	–	11	.711
No. 9 Texas A&M †	10	–	6	.625	26	–	8	.765
No. 17 Texas	10	–	6	.625	22	–	11	.667
No. 14 Baylor	9	–	7	.563	27	–	10	.730
No. 20 Oklahoma State	9	–	7	.563	24	–	11	.686
Texas Tech	5	–	11	.313	18	–	15	.545
Kansas State	5	–	11	.313	14	–	18	.438
Kansas	5	–	11	.313	17	–	16	.515
Colorado	3	–	13	.188	13	–	17	.433
Missouri	2	–	14	.125	12	–	18	.400
† 2010 Big 12 Tournament winner Rankings from AP poll

The 2009–10 Nebraska Cornhuskers women's basketball team represented the University of Nebraska in the 2009–10 NCAA Division I women's basketball season. The Cornhuskers, a member of the Big 12 Conference, were coached by Connie Yori, and completed the regular season unbeaten at 29–0. However, they lost in the semifinals of the Big 12 Tournament to Texas A&M. Their season ended in the semifinals of the Kansas City Regional of the NCAA tournament, where they lost 76–67 to Kentucky.

== Offseason ==
- The Huskers welcomed three incoming freshmen to the program. The rookies were led by 2009 Washington High School Player-of-the-Year Lindsey Moore. The 5-9 point guard was from Kentwood High School in Covington, Washington. She earned third-team All-America honors from Parade magazine after leading the Conquerors to the Class 4A state title and a final No. 2 national ranking in the USA Today Super 25 poll. California forward Meghin Williams and Minnesota forward Katya Leick were the other freshmen.
- May 7: Nebraska incoming freshman Lindsey Moore was one of the nation's top 19-and-under players invited to the USA Basketball Women's U19 National Team Trials in the next week.
- Senior Kelsey Griffin was chosen as a preseason All-Big 12 selection by the league coaches for the third consecutive season.
- Nebraska was picked to finish sixth in the powerful Big 12 Conference in voting by the league's coaches announced on Thursday, October 15, by the conference office in Irving, Texas.
- Nebraska's Kelsey Griffin was officially named one of 30 candidates for the prestigious Lowe's Senior CLASS award on Wednesday, November 4, honoring women's basketball players across the nation who excel both on and off the court.

== Roster ==
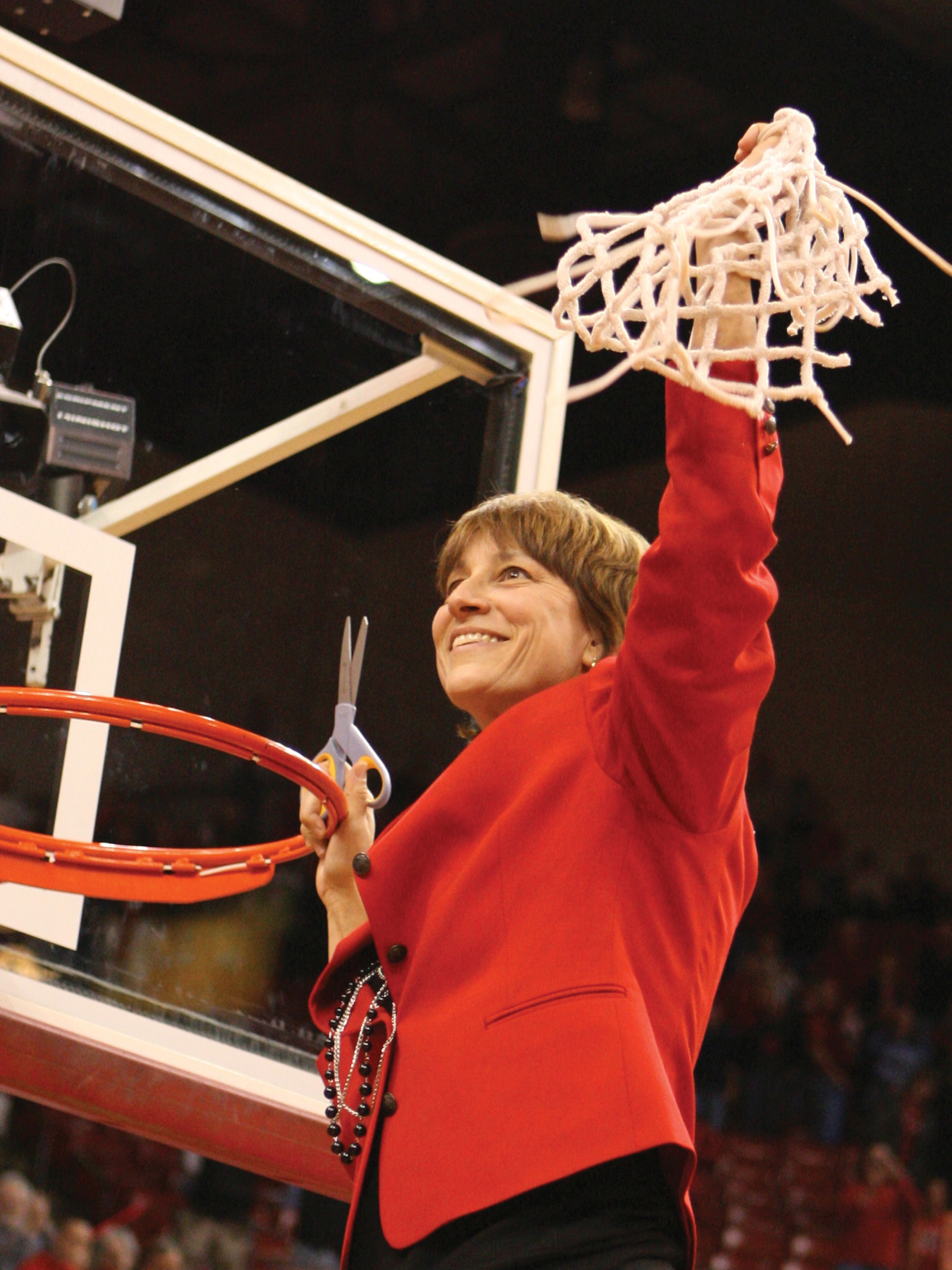
Connie Yori, cutting the nets after leading Nebraska to the 2010 Big 12 Conference regular-season title with a perfect 16–0 record

Number	Name	Height	Position	Class	Hometown
5	Kaitlyn Burke	5-7	Guard	Junior	North Vancouver, British Columbia, Canada
00	Lindsey Moore	5-9	Guard	Freshman	Covington, Washington
10	Meghin Williams	6-1	Forward	Freshman	Rancho Cucamonga, California
11	Nicole Neals	5-6	Guard	Senior	Chandler, Arizona
12	Layne Reeves	5-11	Guard	Redshirt freshman	Lubbock, Texas
13	Kala Kuhlmann	5-8	Guard	Senior	Charter Oak, Iowa
20	Katya Leick	6-1	Forward	Freshman	Grey Cloud Township, Minnesota
21	Harleen Sidhu	6-1	Forward	Sophomore	Surrey, British Columbia, Canada
22	Yvonne Turner	5-8	Guard	Senior	Omaha, Nebraska
23	Kelsey Griffin	6-2	Forward	Senior	Eagle River, Alaska
24	Dominique Kelley	5-7	Guard	Junior	Lincoln, Nebraska
35	Jessica Periago	6-4	Center	Junior	Toulon, France
40	Cory Montgomery	6-2	Forward	Senior	Cannon Falls, Minnesota
42	Nikki Bober	6-4	Center	Senior	Murdock, Nebraska
44	Catheryn Redmon	6-3	Center	Junior	Grand Prairie, Texas

== Schedule ==
=== Preseason exhibitions ===
Date	Location	Opponent	Score	Record
Nov. 3	Devaney Ctr.	Pittsburg State	68-54	1-0
Nov. 8	Devaney Ctr.	Nebraska-Kearney	89-47	2-0

=== Regular season ===
Date	Location	Rank	Opponent	Score	Record
Nov. 13	Devaney Center	NR	Davidson	86-62	1-0
Nov. 15	Las Vegas	NR	UNLV	73-51	2-0
Nov. 19	Devaney Center	NR	Idaho State	88-41	3-0
Nov. 22	Devaney Center	NR	Washington State	107-54	4-0
Nov. 27	Moraga, CA.	NR	UALR	62-45	5-0
Nov. 29	Moraga, CA.	NR	Saint Mary's College	84-73	6-0
Dec. 3	Devaney Center	NR	South Dakota	77-38	7-0
Dec. 5	Coral Gables, FL	NR	Miami	76-71	8-0
Dec. 9	Devaney Center	#24	Creighton	69-56	9-0
Dec. 13	Devaney Center	#24	Northern Illinois	69-44	10-0
Dec. 20	Devaney Center	#20	#5 LSU	77-63	11-0
Dec. 30	Devaney Center	#13	Albany	88-41	12-0
Jan. 4	Burlington, VT.	#12	Vermont	94-50	13-0
Jan. 9	Ames, Iowa	#12	Iowa State	57-49	14-0 (1-0)
Jan. 12	Devaney Center	#11	#19 Texas	91-79	15-0 (2-0)
Jan. 17	Waco, Texas	#11	#9 Baylor	65-56	16-0 (3-0)
Jan. 23	Devaney Center	#7	Kansas State	71-56	17-0 (4-0)
Jan. 27	Lubbock, Texas	#6	Texas tech	89-47	18-0 (5-0)
Jan. 30	Boulder, Colorado	#6	Colorado	80-64	19-0 (6-0)
Feb. 3	Devaney Center	#4	#10 Oklahoma State	88-67	20-0 (7-0)
Feb. 6	Devaney Center	#4	#12 Texas A&M	71-60	21-0 (8-0)
Feb. 10	Lawrence, Kansas	#3	Kansas	67-60	22-0 (9-0)
Feb. 13	Columbia, Missouri	#3	Missouri	82-78	23-0 (10-0)
Feb. 17	Devaney Center	#3	#13 Iowa State	60-50	24-0 (11-0)
Feb. 20	Devaney Center	#3	Colorado	89-73	25-0 (12-0)
Feb. 24	Norman, Oklahoma	#3	#11 Oklahoma	80-64	26-0 (13-0)
Feb. 27	Devaney Center	#3	Missouri	67-51	27-0 (14-0)
March 3	Devaney Center	#3	Kansas	77-52	28-0 (15-0)
March 6	Manhattan, Kansas	#3	Kansas State	82-72	29-0 (16-0)

=== Postseason ===
Big 12 Tournament
Date	Location	Rank	Opponent	Score	Record
March 12	Kansas City, Missouri	#1	#9 Kansas State	63-46	30-0
March 13	Kansas City, Missouri	#1	#4 Texas A&M	70-80	30-1
NCAA Tournament
Date	Location	Seed	Opponent	Score	Record
March 21	Minneapolis	#1	#16 Northern Iowa	83-44	31-1
March 23	Minneapolis	#1	#8 UCLA	83-70	32-1
March 28	Kansas City, Missouri	#1	#4 Kentucky	67–76	32–2

== Player stats ==
Player	Games played	Minutes	Field goals	Three pointers	Free throws	Rebounds	Assists	Blocks	Steals	Points
Bober, Nikki	--	--	--	--	--	--	--	--	--	--
Burke, Kaitlyn	6	5.7	.286	.200	1.000	0.5	3	--	--	1.2
Griffin, Kelsey	32	27.4	.607	.250	.762	10.3	58	22	58	20.4
Kelley, Dominique	32	24.1	.427	.408	.778	3.9	59	1	26	12.0
Kuhlmann, Kala	32	16.8	.340	.313	.806	1.6	27	1	10	3.4
Leick, Katya	10	5.8	.222	.000	.833	1.4	2	0	2	1.8
Montgomery, Cory	32	27.6	.503	.380	.792	5.2	33	7	17	12.8
Moore, Lindsey	32	27.4	.349	.266	.690	2.2	141	6	43	5.8
Neals, Nicole	32	15.0	.324	.284	.364	1.0	46	2	20	3.0
Periago, Jessica	28	8.4	.302	.238	.286	1.7	13	10	6	1.2
Redmon, Catheryn	32	15.9	.620	--	.275	4.6	6	63	13	4.3
Reeves, Layne	23	6.7	.385	.533	.333	0.7	7	3	5	1.3
Sidhu, Harleen	12	5.2	.385	.286	.500	1.7	3	1	1	2.2
Turner, Yvonne	32	26.9	.406	.368	.694	3.6	51	4	62	11.8
Williams, Meghin	13	2.9	.222	.000	.667	0.7	0	0	0	0.9

== Awards and honors ==
=== Players ===
- Big 12 Player of the Year — Kelsey Griffin
- Big 12 Defensive Player of the Year — Yvonne Turner (with Brittney Griner of Baylor)
- First-team All-Big 12 — Griffin (unanimous selection), Cory Montgomery, and Turner
- Lowe's Senior CLASS Award — Kelsey Griffin

=== Coach ===
All of the following were awarded to head coach Connie Yori:

- Naismith College Coach of the Year
- Big 12 Coach of the Year
- WBCA National Coach of the Year
- Kay Yow National Coach of the Year Award

== Rankings ==
Ranking movement
Poll	Pre- season	Nov 16	Nov 23	Nov 30	Dec 7	Dec 14	Dec 21	Dec 28	Jan 4	Jan 11	Jan 18	Jan 25	Feb 1	Feb 8	Jan 15	Jan 22	March 1	March 8	March 15	Final
USA Today/ESPN Coaches' Poll	NR	NR	NR	NR	23	18	14	14	13	9	6	4	4	4	3	3	3	3	4	
Associated Press	NR	NR	NR	NR	24	20	14	13	12	11	7	6	4	3	3	3	3	3	4	
NR = Not ranked

== Team players drafted into the WNBA ==
Round	Pick	Player	WNBA club
1	3	Kelsey Griffin	Minnesota Lynx (traded to Connecticut Sun)
3	25	Cory Montgomery	New York Liberty
