= 2009–10 Texas Longhorns women's basketball team =

Intercollegiate basketball season

2009–10 Texas Longhorns women's basketball
- Conference: Big 12 Conference
- South
- Head coach: Gail Goestenkors
- Assistant coaches: Mickie DeMoss; LaKale Malone; Gale Valley

The 2009–10 Texas Longhorns women's basketball team represented University of Texas at Austin in the 2009–10 NCAA Division I basketball season. The Longhorns were coached by Gail Goestenkors. The Longhorns are a member of the Big 12 Conference.

2009–10 Big 12 Conference women's basketball standings
	Conf.				Overall
Team	W		L	PCT	W		L	PCT
No. 4 Nebraska	16	–	0	1.000	32	–	2	.941
No. 16 Iowa State	11	–	5	.688	25	–	8	.758
No. 12 Oklahoma	11	–	5	.688	27	–	11	.711
No. 9 Texas A&M †	10	–	6	.625	26	–	8	.765
No. 17 Texas	10	–	6	.625	22	–	11	.667
No. 14 Baylor	9	–	7	.563	27	–	10	.730
No. 20 Oklahoma State	9	–	7	.563	24	–	11	.686
Texas Tech	5	–	11	.313	18	–	15	.545
Kansas State	5	–	11	.313	14	–	18	.438
Kansas	5	–	11	.313	17	–	16	.515
Colorado	3	–	13	.188	13	–	17	.433
Missouri	2	–	14	.125	12	–	18	.400
† 2010 Big 12 Tournament winner Rankings from AP poll

== Offseason ==
- May 4: The Texas Women's Basketball team joins an elite field selected to participate in The U.S. Virgin Islands Paradise Jam tournament in November at the University of the Virgin Islands in St. Thomas, USVI.

=== Exhibition ===
Date	Location	Opponent	Score	Record
Nov. 13	Austin	UTSA	71-60	1-0
Nov. 17	San Antonio	Connecticut	58-83	1-1
Nov. 20	Austin	North Texas	96-52	2-1

== Paradise Jam ==
- Games at the 2009 US Virgin Islands Paradise Jam shall be played at the U.V.I. Sports and Fitness Center, a basketball facility located in Charlotte Amalie, St. Thomas.

Date	Time	Visiting team	Home team	Score	Leading Scorer	Leading Rebounder
Nov. 26	9:30 PM	Mississippi State	Texas	Texas, 73-55		
Nov. 27	9:30 PM	Texas	Southern California	SC, 61-54		
Nov. 28	9:30 PM	Texas	Rutgers	Texas, 70-67		

== Regular season ==
- Dec 1: Erika Arriaran made seven 3-pointers and scored a career-high 23 points in a 94–80 victory over Oral Roberts. Arriaran set a career best for three-pointers and grabbed four rebounds.
- The Longhorns will compete in the University of Miami tournament to be held from December 28 to 29.

=== Roster ===
Number	Name	Height	Position	Class
00	Earnesia Williams	6-1	Forward	Senior
4	Erika Arrarian	5-10	Guard	Senior
5	Kathleen Nash	6-2	Guard	Junior
10	Brittainey Raven	6-0	Guard	Senior
12	Yvonne Anderson	5-7	Guard	Sophomore
13	Lauren Flores	5-7	Guard	Freshman
22	Ashley Gayle	6-4	Center	Sophomore
32	Kristen Nash	6-3	Forward	Senior
33	Ashley Fontenette	5-8	Guard	Sophomore
45	Cokie Reed	6-4	Forward	Freshman

=== Schedule ===
- The Longhorns will compete in the University of Miami Tournament, to be held on December 28 and 29.

Date	Location	Opponent	Score	Record
Dec. 1	Austin	Oral Roberts	94-80	1-0
Dec. 6	Knoxville	Tennessee		
Dec. 16	Austin	Mississippi		
Dec. 20	Austin	Texas Southern		
Dec. 28	Miami	Central Michigan		
Dec. 29	Miami	Quinnipiac or Miami		
Jan. 2	Austin	Arkansas Pine Bluff		
Jan. 5	Austin	UT Arlington		
Jan. 9	Austin	Texas A&M		
Jan. 12	Lincoln, NE	Nebraska		
Jan. 16	Lubbock, TX	Texas Tech		
Jan. 20	Austin	Oklahoma State		
Jan. 23	Austin	Iowa State		
Jan. 31	Austin	Baylor		
Feb.3	Norman, OK	Oklahoma		
Feb. 6	Austin	Texas Tech		
Feb. 10	Boulder, CO	Colorado		
Feb. 13	Lawrence, KS	Kansas		
Feb. 17	Austin	Kansas State		
Feb. 20	College Station, TX	Texas A&M		
Feb. 24	Stillwater, OK	Oklahoma State		
Feb. 27	Austin	Oklahoma		
Mar. 3	Austin	Missouri		
Mar. 7	Waco, TX	Baylor		

=== Big 12 Championship ===
Date	Location	Opponent	Longhorns points	Opp. points
Mar. 11	Kansas City			

== Player stats ==
Player	Games played	Minutes	Field goals	Three Pointers	Free Throws	Rebounds	Assists	Blocks	Steals	Points

== Team players drafted into the WNBA ==
Round	Pick	Player	WNBA club
