= 2010 NCAA Division I women's basketball tournament =

American college basketball tournament

- Season: 2009–10
- Teams: 64
- Finals site: Alamodome, San Antonio
- Champions: Connecticut Huskies (7th title, 7th title game, 11th Final Four)
- Runner-up: Stanford Cardinal (4th title game, 9th Final Four)
- Semifinalists: Baylor Bears (2nd Final Four); Oklahoma Sooners (3rd Final Four)
- Winning coach: Geno Auriemma (7th title)
- MOP: Maya Moore (Connecticut)

The 2010 NCAA Division I women's basketball tournament started Saturday, March 20, 2010, and was completed on Tuesday, April 6 of the same year, with University of Connecticut Huskies defending their title from the previous year by defeating Stanford, 53–47.

== Tournament procedure ==
The field consisted of 64 teams for the 17th consecutive season. Thirty automatic bids were awarded to each program that wins their conference's tournament, with a 31st automatic bid going to the regular season champion of the Ivy League. The remaining 33 bids were "at-large", with selections extended by the NCAA Selection Committee.

The tournament is split into four regional tournaments, and each regional has teams seeded from 1 to 16, with the committee ostensibly making every region as comparable to the others as possible. The top-seeded team in each region plays the #16 team, the #2 team plays the #15, etc. (meaning where the two seeds add up to 17, that team will be assigned to play another).

The Selection Committee also seeded the entire field from 1 to 64.

== Notable events ==
The top seeded Tennessee Lady Vols faced the Baylor Lady Bears in the Memphis Regional semifinals. This was a rematch of the season open for the two teams, a game won by Tennessee 74–65. Earlier in March, the freshman center for Baylor, Brittney Griner had broken the nose of Jordan Barncastle in a game against Texas Tech, which resulted in Griner playing more tentative, concerned about drawing attention to the referees. She was not tentative in the game against the Lady Vols, scoring 27 points and recording ten blocks. Despite her performance, Tennessee led by five points with under eight minutes to go in the game. Baylor then went on a 21–1 run to take a 15-point lead, and command of the game. Baylor won 77–62 to advance to the regional finals.

Stanford more than doubled up Georgia, winning 73–36 in the regional semifinal, then faced Xavier. Although Stanford opened up an early five-point lead, Xavier cut the lead to one. The Cardinal extended the lead to five again, and the Musketeers cut the lead to two points at the half. Stanford opened up a six-point lead in the second half, but Xavier responded to take a lead. With just under a minute to go, Xavier took a two-point lead and Kayla Pedersen hit a jumper to tie the game at 53 points apiece. With 18 seconds left, Xavier ran a play that opened up Delaquese Jernigan under the basket. She received the ball, and missed a point-blank uncontested layup. The rebound came out beyond the three-point line to Amber Harris. The Cardinal were trying to cover the Xavier players, but missed Jernigan standing by herself under the basket. Harris passed the ball in to Jernigan who took an uncontested layup and missed it again. With only four seconds left in the game Jeanette Pohlen drove the length of the court, weaving among defenders, and threw up a shot with under a second left. The shot went in and the Cardinal won 55–53 to advance.

In the Kansas City Regional, both top seeds were upset in the semifinal round. Kentucky, led by 21 point from A'dia Mathies, opened up a lead ant he second half, extended it to 19 points, and were victorious, beating Nebraska 76–67 to advance to the regional finals. The regional semifinal game was a second of the season for Oklahoma and Notre Dame, a game the Irish has won in the regular season. In this game the score was tied early, while Oklahoma took a slim lead at the half. They extended the lead to eight points in the second half, but Notre Dame took the lead back at 50–49. With less than a minute to play, Oklahoma took a three-point lead, but Skylar Diggins hit a three-pointer to tie the game at 66 points each. Oklahoma had the ball for the last possession, but never got a shot off, so the game went to overtime. The game was tied with 72 points for each team with seconds to go when Oklahoma had another chance. This time, Nyeshia Stevenson hit a three-pointer, giving the Sooners a three-point lead with just over four seconds to go. Notre Dame tried a long inbounds pass, but were unsuccessful, and Oklahoma won 77–72.

In the Dayton Regional, Connecticut prevailed easily. They held their first three opponents to under 40 points each. While Florida State, in the regional final, managed to 50, the Huskies scored 90. This set up a game against Baylor in a semifinal game. The Baylor Bears would not go so easily. The Huskies seemed to be on the same track as prior games, with a 13-point lead at halftime. Kalana Greene scored the first basket of the second half, extending the lead to 15 points. However, Baylor then scored the next twelve points, cutting the lead to three. Connecticut, which had missed eight consecutive shots, began hitting again, and their defense held Baylor without a field goal for over seven minutes. UConn scored 16 points during the stretch and rebuild the lead. UConn would go on to win the game 70–50, to reach the championship game.

After the close call against Xavier, the Cardinal seemed in control in their game against Oklahoma in the second half when they led by 18 points. However, the Sooners, concentrated on defense, and cut the lead to three points with only 16 seconds left in the game. On the inbounds play, Oklahoma failed to guard Nnemkadi Ogwumike, and Kayla Pedersen made a long pass to an open Ogwumike who made an open layup to extend the lead to five points. Then Stanford stole the ball, was fouled, and hit the final two free throws to complete the victory 73–66. Ogwumike scored 38 points, including the final seven of the game for Stanford.

Stanford entered the national championship game on a 27-game winning streak. The last game they had lost, occurred in December 2009. It was against Connecticut. The UConn team entered the national championship game on a 77 winning streak. The last game they had lost, occurred in April 2008. It was against Stanford.

UConn was no stranger to low scoring halves in an NCAA game. There had been, up to this point, eleven halves of basketball in NCAA tournament history with twelve or fewer points. UConn was involved in four of them. On three occasions, involving Southern University in 2010, Long Island University in 2001, and Temple in 2010, the Huskies held their opponents to twelve or fewer points. However, on this day, Connecticut would be on the opposite side of the ledger, scoring only 12 points against Stanford in the first half. The first two minutes gave no indication of this result. UConn held a 5–0 lead just over two minutes into the game, but they would not score again until after the media timeout with under eight minutes to go in the half. Connecticut hit but 5 of their 29 shot attempts in the first half for a shooting percentage of 17% described by the New York Times as "laughable". However, their inability to hit a basket did not prevent them from playing defense, and they held the Cardinal to 8 baskets on 31 shots, a percentage the Times called "abysmal". Stanford ended the half with an 8-point lead.

The second half proved to be very different. UConn scored 17 of the first 19 points in the half and took a lead. They held Ogwumike, who had scored 38 points in the semifinal, to eleven points. They held Jayne Appel, one of the nation's leading centers, to zero points on 0–12 shooting. Appel was playing on a sore ankle that required pain killers during the game. Maya Moore scored 23 points for UConn and Tina Charles contributed eleven rebounds. In the end, Connecticut won 53–47 to win their seventh national championship and complete the first back-to-back undefeated seasons in NCAA history.

== Schedule and venues ==
First and second rounds (subregionals)

2010 NCAA subregionals — Green 21 & 23 March — Orange 20 & 22 March

The format is the same as the men's tournament, except that there are 64 teams and no play-in game. There are 31 automatic bids for conference champions and 33 at-large bids available.

The subregionals, based on the "pod system" keeping teams at or close to home, were at these locations from March 21 through 24. Prior to the committee's decision to expand the number of subregional sites to sixteen, eight sites were chosen. This list included the Sun National Bank Center in Trenton, New Jersey. When the decision was made to increase the number of sites to sixteen, Trenton declined to participate.

The remaining seven sites continue to be part of the final list of sixteen:

- Frank Erwin Center, University of Texas at Austin, Austin, Texas (Sunday, Tuesday)
- Haas Pavilion, University of California, Berkeley, Berkeley, California (Saturday, Monday)
- Thompson–Boling Arena, University of Tennessee, Knoxville, Tennessee (Saturday, Monday)
- Williams Arena, University of Minnesota, Twin Cities, Minneapolis (Sunday, Tuesday)
- Ted Constant Convocation Center, Old Dominion University, Norfolk, Virginia (Sunday, Tuesday)
- Edmund P. Joyce Center, University of Notre Dame, South Bend, Indiana (Sunday, Tuesday)
- Wells Fargo Arena, Arizona State University, Tempe, Arizona (Saturday, Monday)

As per the expansion of the subregional sites, these nine sites were added in 2008:

- Freedom Hall, Louisville, Kentucky (host: University of Louisville) (Saturday, Monday)
- The Pit, University of New Mexico, Albuquerque, New Mexico
- Cameron Indoor Stadium, Duke University, Durham, North Carolina (Saturday, Monday)
- Lloyd Noble Center, University of Oklahoma, Norman, Oklahoma (Sunday, Tuesday)
- Bank of America Arena at Hec Edmundson Pavilion, University of Washington, Seattle, Washington (Saturday, Monday)
- Petersen Events Center, University of Pittsburgh, Pittsburgh (Sunday, Tuesday)
- Cintas Center, Xavier University, Cincinnati (Sunday, Tuesday)
- Donald L. Tucker Center, Tallahassee, Florida (host: Florida State University) (Saturday, Monday)
- Hilton Coliseum, Iowa State University, Ames, Iowa (Sunday, Tuesday)

That list included Albuquerque, but Albuquerque had to withdraw, due to construction issues. The NCAA added Stanford, as a replacement:

- Maples Pavilion, Stanford University, Palo Alto, California (Saturday, Monday)

Note: Unless otherwise indicated, all locations are on-campus sites.

Sweet Sixteen and Elite Eight (regional semifinals and finals)

2010 NCAA Regionals and Final Four — Blue 27 & 29 March — Purple 28 & 30 March

The Regionals, named for the city rather than the region of geographic importance since 2005, which was held from March 28 to 31, were at these sites:

- Dayton Regional, University of Dayton Arena, Dayton, Ohio
- Kansas City Regional, Sprint Center, Kansas City, Missouri (host: Big 12 Conference)
- Memphis Regional, FedExForum, Memphis, Tennessee (host: University of Memphis)
- Sacramento Regional, ARCO Arena, Sacramento, California (host: University of the Pacific)

National semifinals and championship (Final Four and championship)

- April 4 and 6
  - Alamodome, San Antonio, Texas (hosts: the Incarnate Word, the UTSA, and San Antonio Sports)

This is the second time the women's Final Four was played in San Antonio, having previously been played in the city in 2002.

== Tournament records ==
- Points in a Final Four game—Nnemkadi Ogwumike scored 38 points, the second most ever in an NCAA Final Four game in the National semifinal between Stanford and Oklahoma.
- Free throws—Nnemkadi Ogwumike, Stanford, hit 12 free throws in the semifinal against Oklahoma, tied for the most free throws completed in a semifinal game.
- Free throws—Stanford attempted four three throws in a game against Connecticut, the fewest free throws attempted in an NCAA Tournament game.
- Blocked shots—Brittney Griner, Baylor, blocked 14 shots in the second-round game against Georgetown, the most blocked shots recorded in an NCAA Tournament game since blocks began being recorded in 1988.
- Free throws—Iowa State completed zero throws in a game against Connecticut, tied for the fewest free throws completed in an NCAA Tournament game.
- Blocked shots—Baylor blocked 16 shots in the second-round game against Georgetown, the most blocked shots recorded in an NCAA Tournament game.
- Three-pointers—Maya Moore hit 20 three-point field goals, tied for the most three-point shots completed in an NCAA Tournament.
- Blocked shots—Brittney Griner, Baylor, blocked 40 shots, the most blocked shots recorded in an NCAA Tournament since blocks began being recorded in 1988.
- Three-pointers—Connecticut hit 47 three-point field goals, tied for the most three-point shots completed in an NCAA Tournament.

== Qualifying teams – automatic ==
Sixty-four teams were selected to participate in the 2010 NCAA Tournament. Thirty-one conferences were eligible for an automatic bid to the 2010 NCAA tournament.

Automatic bids
		Record		
Qualifying school	Conference	Regular season	Conference	Seed
Austin Peay	Ohio Valley Conference	15–17	11–7	16
Bowling Green	MAC	27–6	14–2	12
Chattanooga	Southern Conference	24–8	16–4	13
Cleveland State	Horizon League	19–13	11–7	15
Connecticut	Big East	33–0	16–0	1
Duke	ACC	27–5	12–2	2
East Tennessee State	Atlantic Sun Conference	23–8	18–2	14
Gonzaga	West Coast Conference	27–4	14–0	7
Hampton	MEAC	20–11	12–4	15
James Madison	Colonial	26–6	13–5	9
Lamar	Southland	26–7	13–3	14
Lehigh	Patriot League	29–3	13–1	13
Liberty	Big South Conference	27–5	14–2	13
Louisiana Tech	WAC	23–8	11–5	14
Marist	MAAC	26–7	15–3	12
Middle Tennessee State	Sun Belt Conference	25–5	17–1	10
Ohio State	Big Ten	30–4	15–3	2
Portland State	Big Sky Conference	18–14	9–7	15
Princeton	Ivy League	26–2	13–1	11
San Diego State	Mountain West	21–10	10–6	11
South Dakota State	Summit League	22–10	14–4	14
Southern	SWAC	23–8	14–4	16
St. Francis (PA)	Northeast Conference	17–14	11–7	15
Stanford	Pac-10	31–1	18–0	1
Tennessee	SEC	30–2	15–1	1
Texas A&M	Big 12 Conference	25–7	10–6	2
Tulane	Conference USA	26–6	12–4	12
UC-Riverside	Big West Conference	17–15	11–5	16
Northern Iowa	Missouri Valley Conference	17–15	10–8	16
Vermont	America East	26–6	13–3	10
Xavier	Atlantic 10	27–3	14–0	3

== Qualifying teams – at-large ==
Thirty-three additional teams were selected to complete the sixty-four invitations.

At-large bids
		Record		
Qualifying school	Conference	Regular season	Conference	Seed
Baylor	Big 12	23–9	9–7	4
Dayton	Atlantic 10	24–7	11–3	8
DePaul	Big East	21–11	9–7	11
Florida State	Atlantic Coast	26–5	12–2	3
Fresno State	Western Athletic	27–6	16–0	13
Georgetown	Big East	25–6	13–3	5
Georgia	Southeastern	23–8	9–7	5
Georgia Tech	Atlantic Coast	23–9	8–6	6
Green Bay	Horizon	27–4	15–3	12
Hartford	America East	27–4	16–0	10
Iowa	Big Ten	19–13	10–8	8
Iowa State	Big 12	23–7	11–5	4
Kentucky	Southeastern	25–7	11–5	4
LSU	Southeastern	20–9	9–7	7
Michigan State	Big Ten	22–9	12–6	5
Mississippi State	Southeastern	19–12	9–7	7
Nebraska	Big 12	30–1	16–0	1
North Carolina	Atlantic Coast	19–11	6–8	10
N.C. State	Atlantic Coast	20–13	7–7	9
Notre Dame	Big East	27–5	12–4	2
Oklahoma	Big 12	23–10	11–5	3
Oklahoma State	Big 12	23–10	9–7	4
Rutgers	Big East	19–14	9–7	9
St. John's (NY)	Big East	24–6	12–4	6
TCU	Mountain West	22–8	12–4	9
Temple	Atlantic 10	24–8	11–3	8
Texas	Big 12	22–10	10–6	6
UALR	Sun Belt	26–6	17–1	11
UCLA	Pacific-10	24–8	15–3	8
Vanderbilt	Southeastern	22–10	9–7	6
Virginia	Atlantic Coast	21–9	9–5	5
West Virginia	Big East	28–5	13–3	3
Wisconsin	Big Ten	21–10	10–8	7

== Bids by conference ==
Thirty-one conferences earned an automatic bid. In nineteen cases, the automatic bid was the only representative from the conference. Thirty-three additional at-large teams were selected from twelve of the conferences.

Bids	Conference	Teams
7	Big 12	Texas A&M, Baylor, Iowa St., Nebraska, Oklahoma, Oklahoma St., Texas
7	Big East	Connecticut, DePaul, Georgetown, Notre Dame, Rutgers, St. John's NY, West Virginia
6	Atlantic Coast	Duke, Florida St., Georgia Tech, North Carolina, North Carolina St., Virginia
6	Southeastern	Tennessee, Georgia, Kentucky, LSU, Mississippi St., Vanderbilt
4	Big Ten	Ohio St., Iowa, Michigan St., Wisconsin
3	Atlantic 10	Xavier, Dayton, Temple
2	America East	Vermont, Hartford
2	Horizon	Cleveland St., Green Bay
2	Mountain West	San Diego St., TCU
2	Pacific-10	Stanford, UCLA
2	Sun Belt	Middle Tenn., UALR
2	Western Athletic	Louisiana Tech, Fresno St.
1	Atlantic Sun	East Tenn. St.
1	Big Sky	Portland St.
1	Big South	Liberty
1	Big West	UC Riverside
1	Colonial	James Madison
1	Conference USA	Tulane
1	Ivy	Princeton
1	Metro Atlantic	Marist
1	Mid-American	Bowling Green
1	Mid-Eastern	Hampton.
1	Missouri Valley	UNI
1	Northeast	St. Francis PA
1	Ohio Valley	Austin Peay
1	Patriot	Lehigh
1	Southern	Chattanooga
1	Southland	Lamar
1	Southwestern	Southern U.
1	Summit	South Dakota St.
1	West Coast	Gonzaga

== Tournament seeds ==
Dayton RegionalUniversity of Dayton Arena, Dayton, Ohio
Seed	School	Conference	Record	RPI	Berth type
1	Connecticut	Big East	33–0	1	Automatic
2	Ohio State	Big Ten	30–4	9	Automatic
3	Florida State	ACC	26–5	14	At-large
4	Iowa State	Big 12	23–7	26	At-large
5	Virginia	ACC	21–9	17	At-large
6	St. John's	Big East	24–6	20	At-large
7	Mississippi State	SEC	19–12	45	At-large
8	Temple	Atlantic 10	24–8	33	At-large
9	James Madison	CAA	26–6	37	Automatic
10	Middle Tennessee	Sun Belt	25–5	23	Automatic
11	Princeton	Ivy	26–2	51	Automatic
12	Green Bay	Horizon	27–4	70	At-large
13	Lehigh	Patriot	29–3	62	Automatic
14	Louisiana Tech	WAC	23–8	76	Automatic
15	St. Francis (PA)	Northeast	17–14	152	Automatic
16	Southern	SWAC	23–8	190	Automatic

Sacramento RegionalARCO Arena, Sacramento, California
Seed	School	Conference	Record	RPI	Berth type
1	Stanford	Pac-10	31–1	2	Automatic
2	Texas A&M	Big 12	25–7	6	Automatic
3	Xavier	Atlantic 10	27–3	11	Automatic
4	Oklahoma State	Big 12	23–10	12	At-large
5	Georgia	SEC	23–8	25	At-large
6	Vanderbilt	SEC	22–10	21	At-large
7	Gonzaga	West Coast	27–4	30	Automatic
8	Iowa	Big Ten	19–13	43	At-large
9	Rutgers	Big East	19–14	24	At-large
10	North Carolina	ACC	19–11	38	At-large
11	DePaul	Big East	21–11	31	At-large
12	Tulane	Conference USA	26–6	41	Automatic
13	Chattanooga	Southern	24–8	75	Automatic
14	East Tennessee State	Atlantic Sun	23–8	87	Automatic
15	Portland State	Big Sky	18–14	184	Automatic
16	UC Riverside	Big West	17–15	163	Automatic

Memphis RegionalFedEx Forum, Memphis, Tennessee
Seed	School	Conference	Record	RPI	Berth type
1	Tennessee	SEC	30–2	3	Automatic
2	Duke	ACC	27–5	5	Automatic
3	West Virginia	Big East	28–5	10	At-large
4	Baylor	Big 12	23–9	15	At-large
5	Georgetown	Big East	25–6	18	At-large
6	Texas	Big 12	22–10	13	At-large
7	LSU	SEC	20–9	29	At-large
8	Dayton	Atlantic 10	24–7	40	At-large
9	TCU	Mountain West	22–8	42	At-large
10	Hartford	America East	27–4	27	At-large
11	San Diego State	Mountain West	21–10	52	Automatic
12	Marist	MAAC	26–7	49	Automatic
13	Fresno State	WAC	27–6	35	At-large
14	Lamar	Southland	26–7	107	Automatic
15	Hampton	MEAC	20–11	130	Automatic
16	Austin Peay	Ohio Valley	15–17	176	Automatic

Kansas City RegionalSprint Center, Kansas City, Missouri
Seed	School	Conference	Record	RPI	Berth type
1	Nebraska	Big 12	30–1	4	At-large
2	Notre Dame	Big East	27–5	7	At-large
3	Oklahoma	Big 12	23–10	8	At-large
4	Kentucky	SEC	25–7	19	At-large
5	Michigan State	Big 12	22–9	16	At-large
6	Georgia Tech	ACC	23–9	32	At-large
7	Wisconsin	Big Ten	21–10	28	At-large
8	UCLA	Pac-10	24–8	22	At-large
9	NC State	ACC	20–13	34	At-large
10	Vermont	America East	26–6	39	Automatic
11	Arkansas-Little Rock	Sun Belt	26–6	56	At-large
12	Bowling Green	MAC	27–6	47	Automatic
13	Liberty	Big South	27–5	64	Automatic
14	South Dakota State	Summit	22–10	105	Automatic
15	Cleveland State	Horizon	19–13	123	Automatic
16	Northern Iowa	Missouri Valley	17–15	117	Automatic

== Bids by state ==
The sixty-four teams came from twenty-eight states, plus Washington, D.C. Tennessee had the most teams, with six bids. Twenty-two states did not have any teams receiving bids.

NCAA women's basketball tournament invitations by state 2010

Bids	State	Teams
6	Tennessee	Austin Peay, Chattanooga, East Tenn. St., Middle Tenn., Tennessee, Vanderbilt
5	California	San Diego St., Stanford, UC Riverside, Fresno St., UCLA
5	Ohio	Bowling Green, Cleveland St., Ohio St., Xavier, Dayton
5	Texas	Lamar, Texas A&M, Baylor, TCU, Texas
4	Louisiana	Louisiana Tech, Southern U., Tulane, LSU
4	Virginia	Hampton., James Madison, Liberty, Virginia
3	Iowa	UNI, Iowa, Iowa St.
3	New York	Marist, St. Francis PA, St. John's NY
3	North Carolina	Duke, North Carolina, North Carolina St.
2	Connecticut	Connecticut, Hartford
2	Georgia	Georgia, Georgia Tech
2	New Jersey	Princeton, Rutgers
2	Oklahoma	Oklahoma, Oklahoma St.
2	Pennsylvania	Lehigh, Temple
2	Wisconsin	Green Bay, Wisconsin
1	Arkansas	UALR
1	District of Columbia	Georgetown
1	Florida	Florida St.
1	Illinois	DePaul
1	Indiana	Notre Dame
1	Kentucky	Kentucky
1	Michigan	Michigan St.
1	Mississippi	Mississippi St.
1	Nebraska	Nebraska
1	Oregon	Portland St.
1	South Dakota	South Dakota St.
1	Vermont	Vermont
1	Washington	Gonzaga
1	West Virginia	West Virginia

== Game summaries ==
=== Dayton region ===
==== First round ====
Sixth seeded St. John's took on the eleventh seeded Ivy League champion Princeton. The Tigers had won their last 21 games, the nation's third longest win streak. While Princeton stayed close early, only down 15–12 at one time, they missed 15 of their next sixteen shots while St. John's pulled out to a sixteen-point halftime lead. The two teams played roughly evenly the second half, but the halftime lead was more than enough and the Red Storm prevailed 65–47.

Fourteenth seeded Louisiana Tech (La Tech) was returning to the NCAA Tournament after a three-year absence. Under Maggie Dixon award winning new coach Teresa Weatherspoon, the Lady Techsters took on third seeded Florida State. La Tech started out strong, pulling out to a nine-point lead late in the first half, but the Seminoles fought back to a 40–40 tie at halftime. The score was close well into the second half, with Florida State holding onto a one-point lead with just under nine minutes to go, but the Seminoles gradually increased the lead to ten. Although the Lady Techsters cut the lead in half to 65–61 with just under two minutes left, they would not score again and Florida State would hit ten straight free throws in the closing minutes to win 75–61.

=== Kansas City region ===
==== First round ====
Michigan State's fifth year senior Aisha Jefferson had stomach problems from a pre-game meal severe enough to keep her hunched over the front of a trash can in the first half, but it was not enough to keep her out of the game. She scored 17 points along with nine rebounds to help lead the fifth seeded Spartans over 12 seed Bowling Green 72–62.

Thirteenth seeded Liberty tried to challenge fourth seeded Kentucky, scoring the first six points, and leading by as much as nine early, but Kentucky's freshman A'dia Mathies scored 32 points to set a personal career high and an NCAA tournament record for Kentucky to help the Wildcats retake the lead. The Liberty Flames fought back, and had a slim two-point lead at halftime, but the Kentucky team, behind 26 of 36 free-throws, pulled ahead to win 83–77.

=== Memphis region ===
==== First round ====
Seventh seeded LSU easily beat tenth seeded Hartford 60–39. This was Hartford's first at-large invitation to the NCAA Tournament, but without leading scorer Erica Beverly, lost to a season-ending injury, the Hawks were unable to stay with the Tigers. LSU held Hartford scoreless for nearly eight minutes, scoring 17 consecutive points to take an early lead they would never give up.

Top seeded Tennessee defeated 16 seed Austin Peay 75–42. Playing at their home court "The Summitt", the Lady Vols scored 15 points before allowing a score by the Lady Govs.

Second-seeded Duke took on 15 seed Hampton in Cameron Indoor Stadium, the Blue Devils home court, where Duke had won twelve consecutive NCAA Tournament games. The Pirates managed to hold a slim lead in the early minutes of the game, but Duke quickly took over, moving out to a 40–14 halftime lead and winning easily 72–37.

Eighth seeded Dayton took on ninth seeded TCU in their first NCAA appearance. Early in the second half, it appeared that Dayton would only be playing one game, as they were behind by 18 points, 50–32. However, the Flyers did not fold, and hit a basket with one second left in the game to win by a single point 67–66.

Twelve seed Marist scored the first seven points in their game against five seed Georgetown, which may have reminded fans of the way Marist played in 2007, coming to the tournament as a 13 seed, and knocking off Ohio State and Middle Tennessee to make it to the round of sixteen. Georgetown, which had not been to the tournament in 17 years, started slowly, but managed to hold a two-point lead at halftime. Georgetown's Monica McNutt hit back-to-back three-pointers to start a 13–0 run at the beginning of the second half. The Red Foxes would never close the gap, and Georgetown went on to win 62–42.

Fourth seed Baylor took on 13th seed Fresno State. Baylor's Brittney Griner returned to the floor, after sitting out a two-game suspension for hitting an opponent in a game. This was freshman Griner's first tournament, and she confessed to having jitters, but she controlled the lane, and help keep Fresno State from winning their first ever NCAA game. Baylor held a six-point lead at halftime, which they stretched out to a 69–55 final score.

=== Sacramento region ===
==== First round ====
A fifteen seed has never beaten a two seed in the NCAA Women's Tournament, but with under five minutes left in the first half, 15th seeded Portland State was ahead of the second seed Texas A&M. The lead did not last long, as the Aggies pulled to an eight-point lead at halftime, and extended the lead through the second half. Texas A&M's Tanisha Smith just missed a triple double, with nine assists to go along with 17 points and 10 rebounds. The final score favored the Aggies 84–53.

Normally, a four seed would be a large favorite against a 13 seed, but normally, the four seed is not required to bench one of their players, and not just any player, but Andrea Riley, the third leading scorer in Division 1. Two years earlier, Riley had thrown a punch in an NCAA game, which earned her a one-game suspension. NCAA rules required that it be an NCAA game. Oklahoma State lost the game in which the punch was thrown, and did not make it to the Tournament in 2009, so the suspension was served two years later. The 13th seeded Chattanooga tried to take advantage of the situation, and led by as much as 18 in the first half. Riley could only cheer on the team from the bench. Freshman Toni Young responded by scoring 22 points, and senior Tegan Cunningham, after struggling in the first half, began hitting in the second half and ended up with 25 points, enough to help Oklahoma State win 70–63.

The 8/9 match-up between Iowa and Rutgers pitted current Rutgers coach C. Vivian Stringer against the program she helped bring to national prominence two decades earlier. Iowa had lost a game in the Big Ten tournament, after a big lead, and they did not want to experience that again. Rutgers played even with the Hawkeyes, in the second half, but the seven point halftime lead stood up, and Iowa won 70–63.

Seventh seed Gonzaga took on tenth seeded North Carolina. Gonzaga's Tiffanie Shives was scoreless for 31 minutes, but then scored 14 in the next five minutes. Her first basket cut the Tarheels' lead to two, and her next basket gave Gonzaga a lead they would not relinquish, although North Carolina cut the lead to one with under four minutes to go, only to fall short 82–76.

Twelfth seed Tulane stayed with fifth seed Georgia for 32 minutes, in a game with five lead changes and four ties, but then the Bulldogs went on an 18–2 run to take the lead for good. Georgia's Ashley Houts would score 22 points for the winning team, and teammate Angel Robinson had a double-double (18 points, 13 rebounds) to help lead the Bulldogs over the Green Wave 64–59.

The last time Stanford was a number 1 seed, they became the only top seed in the men's or women's tournament to lose to a sixteen seed. Earlier in the day, the top seeded men's team, Kansas, lost to Northern Iowa, so no one felt safe in the opening match against UC Riverside. Stanford jumped out to an 8–0 lead, and behind Ogwumike's double-double (19 points, 11 rebounds) won easily over the Big West champion 79–47.

== Brackets ==
Results to date (* indicates game went to overtime):

=== Dayton Regional – Dayton, Ohio ===
First round March 20–21
1	Connecticut	95
16	Southern	39
Norfolk, Virginia
8	Temple	65
9	James Madison	53
5	Virginia	67
12	Green Bay	69
Ames, Iowa
4	Iowa State	79
13	Lehigh	42
6	St. John's	65
11	Princeton	47
Tallahassee, Florida
3	Florida State	75
14	Louisiana Tech	61
7	Mississippi State	68
10	Middle Tennessee	64
Pittsburgh, Pennsylvania
2	Ohio State	93
15	St. Francis (Pa.)	59

Second round March 22–23
1	Connecticut	90
8	Temple	36
12	Green Bay	56
4	Iowa State	60
6	St. John's	65
3	Florida State	66*
7	Mississippi State	87
2	Ohio State	67

Regional semifinals March 28
1	Connecticut	74
4	Iowa State	36
3	Florida State	74
7	Mississippi State	71

Regional finals March 30
1	Connecticut	90
3	Florida State	50

=== Memphis Regional – Memphis, Tennessee ===
First round March 20–21
1	Tennessee	75
16	Austin Peay	42
Knoxville, Tennessee
8	Dayton	67
9	TCU	66
5	Georgetown	62
12	Marist	42
Berkeley, California
4	Baylor	69
13	Fresno State	55
6	Texas	63
11	San Diego State	74
Austin, Texas
3	West Virginia	58
14	Lamar	43
7	LSU	60
10	Hartford	39
Durham, North Carolina
2	Duke	72
15	Hampton	37

Second round March 22–23
1	Tennessee	92
8	Dayton	64
5	Georgetown	33
4	Baylor	49
11	San Diego State	64
3	West Virginia	55
7	LSU	52
2	Duke	60

Regional semifinals March 27
1	Tennessee	62
4	Baylor	77
11	San Diego State	58
2	Duke	66

Regional finals March 29
4	Baylor	51
2	Duke	48

=== Sacramento Regional – Sacramento, California ===
First round March 20–21
1	Stanford	79
16	UC Riverside	47
Stanford, California
8	Iowa	70
9	Rutgers	63
5	Georgia	64
12	Tulane	59
Tempe, Arizona
4	Oklahoma State	70
13	Chattanooga	63
6	Vanderbilt	83*
11	DePaul	76
Cincinnati, Ohio
3	Xavier	94
14	East Tennessee State	82
7	Gonzaga	82
10	North Carolina	76
Seattle, WA
2	Texas A&M	84
15	Portland State	53

Second round March 22–23
1	Stanford	96
8	Iowa	67
5	Georgia	74*
4	Oklahoma State	71
6	Vanderbilt	62
3	Xavier	63
7	Gonzaga	72
2	Texas A&M	71

Regional semifinals March 27
1	Stanford	73
5	Georgia	36
3	Xavier	74
7	Gonzaga	56

Regional finals March 29
1	Stanford	55
3	Xavier	53

=== Kansas City Regional – Kansas City, Missouri ===
First round March 20–21
1	Nebraska	83
16	Northern Iowa	44
Minneapolis, Minnesota
8	UCLA	74
9	NC State	54
5	Michigan State	72
12	Bowling Green	62
Louisville, Kentucky
4	Kentucky	83
13	Liberty	77
6	Georgia Tech	53
11	Arkansas-Little Rock	63
Norman, Oklahoma
3	Oklahoma	68
14	South Dakota State	57
7	Wisconsin	55
10	Vermont	64
Notre Dame, Indiana
2	Notre Dame	86
15	Cleveland State	58

Second round March 22–23
1	Nebraska	83
8	UCLA	70
5	Michigan State	52
4	Kentucky	70
11	Arkansas-Little Rock	44
3	Oklahoma	60
10	Vermont	66
2	Notre Dame	84

Regional semifinals March 28
1	Nebraska	67
4	Kentucky	76
3	Oklahoma	77*
2	Notre Dame	72

Regional finals March 30
4	Kentucky	68
3	Oklahoma	88

=== Final Four – San Antonio, Texas ===
National Semifinals; April 4
D1	Connecticut	70
M4	Baylor	50
S1	Stanford	73
K3	Oklahoma	66

National Championship Game; April 6
D1	Connecticut	53
S1	Stanford	47

== Record by conference ==
Conference	# of Bids	Record	Win %	Round of 32	Sweet Sixteen	Elite Eight	Final Four	Championship Game
Big 12	7	14–7	.667	6	4	2	2	–
Big East	7	11–6	.647	5	2	1	1	1
ACC	6	6–6	.500	2	2	2	–	–
SEC	6	11–6	.647	6	4	1	–	–
Big Ten	4	3–4	.429	3	–	–	–	–
Atlantic 10	3	5–3	.625	3	1	1	–	–
America East	2	1–2	.333	1	–	–	–	–
Horizon	2	1–2	.333	1	–	–	–	–
Mountain West	2	2–2	.500	1	1	–	–	–
Pac-10	2	6–2	.750	2	1	1	1	1
Sun Belt	2	1–2	.333	1	–	–	–	–
WAC	2	0–2	.000	–	–	–	–	–
West Coast	1	2–1	.667	1	1	–	–	–

Eighteen conferences went 0–1: the Atlantic Sun, Big Sky, Big South, Big West, Colonial, Conference USA, Ivy League, MAAC, MEAC, MAC, Missouri Valley, Northeast, Ohio Valley, Patriot, Southern, Southland, SWAC and Summit.

== All-Tournament team ==
- Maya Moore, Connecticut
- Tina Charles, Connecticut
- Nneka Ogwumike, Stanford
- Kayla Pedersen, Stanford
- Danielle Robinson, Oklahoma

== Game officials ==
- Tina Napier (semifinal)
- Bryan Enterline (semifinal)
- Denise Brooks (semifinal)
- Lisa Mattingly (semifinal)
- Michael Price (semifinal)
- Laura Morris (semifinal)
- Dee Kantner (final)
- Eric Brewton (final)
- Lisa Jones (final)

== Media coverage ==
=== Television ===
ESPN had US television rights to all games during the tournament. For the first and second round, ESPN aired select games nationally on ESPN or ESPNU. All other games were aired regionally on ESPN2 and streamed online via ESPN3. Most of the nation got whip-around coverage during this time, which allowed ESPN to rotate between the games and focus the nation on the one that was the closest. The regional semifinals were split between ESPN and ESPN2, and ESPN aired the regional finals, national semifinals, and championship match.

==== Studio host and analysts ====
- Trey Wingo (host)
- Kara Lawson (analyst)
- Carolyn Peck (analyst)

==== Commentary teams ====
First & second rounds Saturday/Monday

- Beth Mowins and Stephanie Ready – Durham, North Carolina
- Dave O'Brien and Doris Burke – Knoxville, Tennessee
- Justin Kutcher and Rebecca Lobo – Louisville, Kentucky
- Jon Sciambi and Abby Waner – Tallahassee, Florida
- Terry Gannon and Mary Murphy – Stanford, California
- Cara Capuano and Kayte Christensen – Berkeley, California
- Allen Hopkins and Krista Blunk – Seattle, Washington
- Dave Pasch and Brenda VanLengen – Tempe, Arizona

Sweet Sixteen & Elite Eight Saturday/Monday

- Dave O'Brien, Doris Burke, and Holly Rowe – Memphis, Tennessee
- Dave Pasch, Mary Murphy, and Cara Capuano – Sacramento, California

Final Four

- Dave O'Brien, Doris Burke, Rebecca Lobo, and Holly Rowe – San Antonio, Texas

First & second rounds Sunday/Tuesday

- Bob Picozzi and Jimmy Dykes – Ames, Iowa
- Carter Blackburn and LaChina Robinson – Austin, Texas
- Bob Wischusen and Stephanie White – Cincinnati, Ohio
- Clay Matvick and Leslie Hill – Minneapolis, Minnesota
- Marc Kestecher and Stephen Bardo – Norfolk, Virginia
- Dan McLaughlin and Fran Fraschilla – Norman, Oklahoma
- Eric Collins and Brooke Weisbrod – Notre Dame, Indiana
- Pam Ward and Debbie Antonelli – Pittsburgh, Pennsylvania

Sweet Sixteen & Elite Eight Sunday/Tuesday

- Bob Wischusen, Stephanie White, and Rebecca Lobo – Dayton, Ohio
- Pam Ward, Debbie Antonelli, and Beth Mowins – Kansas City, Missouri

Championship

- Dave O'Brien, Doris Burke, Rebecca Lobo, and Holly Rowe – San Antonio, Texas

== See also ==
- 2010 NCAA Division II women's basketball tournament
- 2010 NCAA Division III women's basketball tournament
- 2010 NAIA Division I women's basketball tournament
- 2010 NAIA Division II women's basketball tournament
- 2010 NCAA Division I men's basketball tournament
