= 2009–10 NCAA Division I women's basketball rankings =

- Season: 2009–10
- NCAA Tournament: 2010
- Preseason No. 1: Connecticut
- NCAA Tournament Champions: Connecticut
NCAA Division I women's basketball rankings
| |

Two human polls comprise the 2009–10 NCAA Division I women's basketball rankings, the AP Poll and the Coaches Poll, in addition to various publications' preseason polls. The AP poll is currently a poll of sportswriters, while the USA Today Coaches' Poll is a poll of college coaches. The AP conducts polls weekly through the end of the regular season and conference play, while the Coaches poll conducts a final, post-NCAA tournament poll as well.

== Legend ==
| – | No votes |
| (#) | Ranking |

== AP Poll ==
| Team | Pre- Season | Nov 16 | Nov 23 | Nov 30 | Dec 7 | Dec 14 | Dec 21 | Dec 28 | Jan 4 | Jan 11 | Jan 18 | Jan 25 | Feb 2 | Feb 8 | Feb 15 | Feb 22 | Mar 1 | Mar 8 | Mar 15 |
|---|---|---|---|---|---|---|---|---|---|---|---|---|---|---|---|---|---|---|---|
| Connecticut | 1 | 1 | 1 | 1 | 1 | 1 | 1 | 1 | 1 | 1 | 1 | 1 | 1 | 1 | 1 | 1 | 1 | 1 | 1 |
| Stanford | 2 | 2 | 2 | 2 | 2 | 2 | 2 | 2 | 2 | 2 | 2 | 2 | 2 | 2 | 2 | 2 | 2 | 2 | 2 |
| Tennessee | 8 | 6 | 6 | 6 | 4 | 3 | 4 | 4 | 4 | 4 | 3 | 5 | 5 | 5 | 5 | 4 | 4 | 4 | 3 |
| Nebraska | – | – | – | – | 24 | 20 | 14 | 13 | 12 | 11 | 7 | 6 | 4 | 3 | 3 | 3 | 3 | 3 | 4 |
| Xavier | 11 | 9 | 9 | 9 | 8 | 12 | 15 | 15 | 16 | 14 | 11 | 10 | 7 | 6 | 6 | 5 | 5 | 5 | 5 |
| Duke | 6 | 11 | 10 | 11 | 7 | 7 | 8 | 8 | 9 | 7 | 6 | 7 | 6 | 8 | 8 | 6 | 9 | 7 | 6 |
| Notre Dame | 4 | 5 | 5 | 5 | 3 | 4 | 3 | 3 | 3 | 3 | 4 | 3 | 3 | 4 | 4 | 7 | 6 | 6 | 7 |
| Ohio State | 3 | 3 | 3 | 3 | 9 | 8 | 6 | 6 | 6 | 5 | 5 | 4 | 8 | 7 | 7 | 10 | 10 | 8 | 8 |
| Texas A&M | – | 15 | 11 | 10 | 10 | 13 | 10 | 10 | 10 | 8 | 9 | 8 | 12 | 13 | 15 | 12 | 15 | 11 | 9 |
| West Virginia | – | – | – | – | – | – | – | – | 22 | 18 | 16 | 16 | 11 | 9 | 9 | 8 | 7 | 9 | 10 |
| Florida State | 15 | 13 | 12 | 12 | 12 | 10 | 12 | 12 | 13 | 16 | 15 | 13 | 16 | 10 | 10 | 9 | 8 | 10 | 11 |
| Oklahoma | 13 | 20 | 20 | 18 | 16 | 15 | 13 | 14 | 14 | 13 | 13 | 11 | 13 | 12 | 11 | 11 | 11 | 12 | 12 |
| Georgetown | – | – | – | – | – | – | – | – | – | 24 | 19 | 17 | 18 | 16 | 14 | 13 | 12 | 13 | 13 |
| Baylor | 7 | 8 | 8 | 8 | 6 | 6 | 5 | 5 | 5 | 9 | 10 | 14 | 15 | 11 | 18 | 17 | 14 | 16 | 14 |
| South Carolina | – | – | – | – | – | – | – | – | – | – | – | – | 25 | 25 | 22 | 18 | 16 | 17 | 15 |
| Iowa State | – | – | – | – | – | – | – | – | – | – | – | – | – | 20 | 13 | 15 | 13 | 14 | 16 |
| Texas | 12 | 10 | 13 | 17 | 17 | 17 | 17 | 17 | 15 | 19 | 20 | 19 | 17 | 14 | 12 | 14 | 18 | 15 | 17 |
| Gonzaga | – | – | – | – | – | – | – | – | – | – | – | – | 24 | 22 | 21 | 19 | 17 | 18 | 18 |
| Kentucky | – | – | – | – | – | – | – | – | – | – | – | – | 20 | 17 | 16 | 16 | 19 | 19 | 19 |
| Oklahoma State | – | – | – | – | – | – | – | – | 23 | 15 | 12 | 15 | 10 | 15 | 17 | 23 | 20 | 20 | 20 |
| LSU | 9 | 7 | 7 | 7 | 5 | 5 | 11 | 11 | 11 | 12 | 18 | 18 | 19 | 23 | 23 | 20 | 21 | 22 | 21 |
| UCLA | – | – | – | – | – | – | – | – | – | – | – | – | – | – | – | – | – | 23 | 22 |
| Georgia | 21 | 16 | 14 | 13 | 13 | 11 | 9 | 9 | 8 | 6 | 8 | 9 | 14 | 19 | 20 | 24 | 22 | 24 | 23 |
| Michigan State | 10 | 21 | 25 | 22 | 21 | 16 | 16 | 16 | 19 | 20 | – | – | – | – | – | – | 25 | 25 | 24 |
| Hartford | – | – | – | – | – | – | – | – | – | – | – | – | – | – | – | 25 | 23 | 21 | 25 |
| Virginia | 14 | 12 | 16 | 14 | 19 | 19 | 23 | 23 | 21 | 23 | 25 | 21 | – | – | – | 21 | 24 | – | – |
| Georgia Tech | 19 | – | – | 23 | – | 25 | 24 | 24 | 20 | 21 | 22 | 25 | 21 | 21 | 19 | 22 | – | – | – |
| North Carolina | 5 | 4 | 4 | 4 | 11 | 9 | 7 | 7 | 7 | 10 | 14 | 12 | 9 | 18 | – | – | – | – | – |
| Maryland | – | – | – | – | – | – | – | – | – | 25 | – | – | – | – | – | – | – | – | – |
| Miami | – | – | – | – | 25 | – | – | – | – | – | – | – | – | – | – | – | – | – | – |
| Wake Forest | – | – | – | – | – | – | – | – | – | – | – | – | – | – | – | – | – | – | – |
| Boston College | – | – | – | – | – | – | – | – | – | – | – | – | – | – | – | – | – | – | – |
| TCU | – | – | – | – | – | – | – | – | 25 | 22 | 23 | 20 | – | 24 | 24 | – | – | – | – |
| Vanderbilt | 22 | 22 | 21 | 16 | 18 | 18 | 19 | 18 | 17 | – | 21 | – | – | – | 25 | – | – | – | – |
| Ohio State | – | – | – | – | – | – | – | – | – | – | – | 22 | 22 | – | – | – | – | – | – |
| Green Bay | – | – | – | – | – | – | 22 | 22 | 18 | 17 | 17 | 24 | 23 | – | – | – | – | – | – |
| Penn State | – | – | – | – | – | – | – | – | – | – | – | 23 | – | – | – | – | – | – | – |
| Vermont | – | – | – | – | – | – | – | – | – | – | 24 | – | – | – | – | – | – | – | – |
| Kansas | 20 | 19 | 18 | 24 | 23 | 22 | 21 | 21 | 24 | – | – | – | – | – | – | – | – | – | – |
| Arizona State | 16 | 14 | 17 | 15 | 14 | 14 | 18 | 19 | – | – | – | – | – | – | – | – | – | – | – |
| Pittsburgh | – | – | 24 | 19 | 15 | 21 | 20 | 20 | – | – | – | – | – | – | – | – | – | – | – |
| James_Madison | – | – | – | – | – | 24 | 25 | 25 | – | – | – | – | – | – | – | – | – | – | – |
| West Virginia | – | – | – | – | – | 23 | – | – | – | – | – | – | – | – | – | – | – | – | – |
| Dayton | – | – | – | 25 | 20 | – | – | – | – | – | – | – | – | – | – | – | – | – | – |
| California | 18 | 17 | 22 | 20 | 22 | – | – | – | – | – | – | – | – | – | – | – | – | – | – |
| DePaul | 17 | 18 | 15 | 21 | – | – | – | – | – | – | – | – | – | – | – | – | – | – | – |
| Mississippi State | – | 25 | 19 | – | – | – | – | – | – | – | – | – | – | – | – | – | – | – | – |
| San Diego St | – | – | 23 | – | – | – | – | – | – | – | – | – | – | – | – | – | – | – | – |
| Louisville | 23 | 23 | – | – | – | – | – | – | – | – | – | – | – | – | – | – | – | – | – |
| Middle Tennessee | 24 | 24 | – | – | – | – | – | – | – | – | – | – | – | – | – | – | – | – | – |
| Rutgers | 25 | – | – | – | – | – | – | – | – | – | – | – | – | – | – | – | – | – | – |

== USA Today Coaches poll ==
| Team | Pre- Season | Nov 16 | Nov 23 | Nov 30 | Dec 7 | Dec 14 | Dec 21 | Dec 28 | Jan 4 | Jan 11 | Jan 18 | Jan 25 | Feb 2 | Feb 8 | Feb 15 | Feb 22 | Mar 1 | Mar 8 | Mar 15 | Apr 7 |
|---|---|---|---|---|---|---|---|---|---|---|---|---|---|---|---|---|---|---|---|---|
| Connecticut | 1 | 1 | 1 | 1 | 1 | 1 | 1 | 1 | 1 | 1 | 1 | 1 | 1 | 1 | 1 | 1 | 1 | 1 | 1 | 1 |
| Stanford | 2 | 2 | 2 | 2 | 2 | 2 | 2 | 2 | 2 | 2 | 2 | 2 | 2 | 2 | 2 | 2 | 2 | 2 | 2 | 2 |
| Oklahoma | 8 | 16 | 17 | 18 | 16 | 15 | 15 | 15 | 15 | 13 | 13 | 12 | 13 | 12 | 11 | 10 | 12 | 12 | 12 | 3 |
| Baylor | 4 | 9 | 8 | 8 | 6 | 5 | 5 | 5 | 5 | 10 | 12 | 16 | 17 | 15 | 19 | 17 | 15 | 18 | 18 | 4 |
| Xavier | 15 | 14 | 10 | 10 | 8 | 14 | 13 | 13 | 14 | 12 | 10 | 10 | 7 | 6 | 6 | 5 | 5 | 5 | 5 | 5 |
| Duke | 6 | 12 | 12 | 12 | 10 | 8 | 8 | 9 | 9 | 7 | 7 | 7 | 6 | 7 | 7 | 6 | 8 | 6 | 6 | 6 |
| Nebraska | – | – | – | – | 23 | 18 | 14 | 14 | 13 | 9 | 6 | 4 | 4 | 4 | 3 | 3 | 3 | 3 | 4 | 7 |
| Tennessee | 9 | 5 | 5 | 5 | 3 | 3 | 4 | 4 | 4 | 4 | 3 | 5 | 5 | 5 | 5 | 4 | 4 | 4 | 3 | 8 |
| Kentucky | – | – | – | – | – | – | – | – | – | – | 25 | 23 | 18 | 16 | 16 | 14 | 18 | 16 | 15 | 9 |
| Florida State | 12 | 10 | 9 | 9 | 7 | 6 | 11 | 11 | 11 | 16 | 16 | 14 | 12 | 10 | 10 | 9 | 6 | 10 | 11 | 9 |
| Notre Dame | 7 | 6 | 6 | 6 | 4 | 4 | 3 | 3 | 3 | 3 | 5 | 3 | 3 | 3 | 3 | 8 | 7 | 7 | 7 | 11 |
| Gonzaga | – | – | – | – | – | – | – | – | – | – | – | – | – | 23 | 22 | 20 | 17 | 15 | 14 | 12 |
| Iowa State | 24 | 24 | – | – | – | – | – | – | 23 | 20 | 21 | 18 | 19 | 17 | 12 | 13 | 13 | 14 | 16 | 13 |
| Texas A&M | 16 | 8 | 7 | 7 | 5 | 11 | 10 | 10 | 10 | 8 | 9 | 8 | 10 | 11 | 15 | 15 | 14 | 11 | 9 | 14 |
| Ohio State | 3 | 3 | 3 | 3 | 9 | 7 | 6 | 6 | 6 | 5 | 4 | 6 | 9 | 9 | 9 | 12 | 10 | 9 | 8 | 15 |
| West Virginia | – | – | – | – | – | 23 | 21 | 19 | 17 | 13 | 11 | 11 | 8 | 8 | 8 | 7 | 9 | 8 | 10 | 16 |
| Georgetown | – | – | – | – | – | – | – | – | 25 | 18 | 18 | 15 | 16 | 13 | 12 | 11 | 11 | 13 | 13 | 17 |
| St. John's | – | – | – | – | – | – | – | – | – | – | – | – | 25 | 24 | 23 | 19 | 16 | 17 | 17 | 18 |
| Georgia | – | 22 | 19 | 16 | 13 | 12 | 9 | 8 | 8 | 6 | 8 | 9 | 14 | 18 | 20 | 24 | 24 | – | – | 19 |
| Purdue | – | – | 24 | – | – | – | – | – | – | – | – | – | – | – | – | – | – | – | – | 20 |
| Middle Tennessee | – | – | 22 | – | – | – | – | – | – | – | – | – | – | – | – | – | – | – | – | 21 |
| Oklahoma State | – | – | – | – | – | – | – | – | – | 19 | 17 | 17 | 11 | 14 | 17 | 21 | 20 | 21 | 19 | 22 |
| UCLA | – | – | – | – | – | – | – | – | – | – | – | – | – | – | – | – | 25 | 23 | 22 | 23 |
| Vanderbilt | 20 | 18 | 16 | 14 | 17 | 16 | 16 | 16 | 16 | 22 | 20 | 24 | 22 | 22 | 20 | 22 | – | – | – | 24 |
| LSU | 17 | 15 | 11 | 11 | 12 | 9 | 12 | 12 | 12 | 15 | 19 | 19 | 21 | – | – | – | – | – | – | 25 |
| Texas | 14 | 13 | 14 | 17 | 21 | 21 | 22 | 22 | 20 | 21 | 23 | 25 | 23 | 19 | 14 | 16 | 22 | 20 | 20 | 25 |
| Virginia | 18 | 17 | 18 | 15 | 19 | 17 | 20 | 21 | 19 | 24 | 22 | 20 | 24 | 21 | 18 | 18 | 19 | 22 | 21 | – |
| Georgia Tech | – | – | – | – | – | – | – | – | – | – | – | – | – | – | – | – | – | – | – | – |
| North Carolina | 5 | 4 | 4 | 4 | 11 | 10 | 7 | 7 | 7 | 11 | 15 | 13 | 15 | 20 | – | – | – | – | – | – |
| Miami (FL) | – | – | – | – | – | – | – | – | – | – | – | – | – | – | – | – | – | – | – | – |
| Maryland | 21 | 20 | – | 22 | 18 | – | – | – | – | – | – | – | – | – | – | – | – | – | – | – |
| North Carolina State | – | – | – | – | – | – | – | – | – | – | – | – | – | – | – | – | – | – | – | – |
| Hartford | – | – | – | – | – | – | – | – | – | – | – | – | – | 25 | 24 | 23 | 21 | 19 | 23 | – |
| Middle Tennessee | – | – | – | – | – | – | – | – | – | – | – | – | – | – | – | – | – | 25 | 24 | – |
| Michigan State | 10 | 21 | 25 | 21 | 24 | 20 | 18 | 24 | 21 | 23 | – | – | – | – | – | 25 | 23 | 24 | 25 | – |
| TCU | – | – | – | – | – | – | – | – | – | – | 24 | 21 | – | – | 25 | – | – | – | – | – |
| Green Bay | – | – | – | – | – | 24 | 23 | 20 | 18 | 17 | 14 | 22 | 20 | – | – | – | – | – | – | – |
| Syracuse | – | – | – | – | 25 | 22 | 24 | 23 | – | 25 | – | – | – | – | – | – | – | – | – | – |
| Pittsburgh | 22 | 25 | 20 | 20 | 15 | 19 | 19 | 18 | 22 | – | – | – | – | – | – | – | – | – | – | – |
| Arizona State | 11 | 7 | 13 | 13 | 14 | 13 | 17 | 17 | 24 | – | – | – | – | – | – | – | – | – | – | – |
| James_Madison | – | – | – | – | – | 25 | 25 | 25 | – | – | – | – | – | – | – | – | – | – | – | – |
| Dayton | – | – | – | 24 | 20 | – | – | – | – | – | – | – | – | – | – | – | – | – | – | – |
| California | 13 | 11 | 15 | 19 | 22 | – | – | – | – | – | – | – | – | – | – | – | – | – | – | – |
| DePaul | 25 | – | 21 | 23 | – | – | – | – | – | – | – | – | – | – | – | – | – | – | – | – |
| Louisville | 19 | 19 | – | 25 | – | – | – | – | – | – | – | – | – | – | – | – | – | – | – | – |
| Kansas | – | – | 23 | – | – | – | – | – | – | – | – | – | – | – | – | – | – | – | – | – |
| Purdue | 23 | 23 | – | – | – | – | – | – | – | – | – | – | – | – | – | – | – | – | – | – |
