= 2009–10 Colorado Buffaloes women's basketball team =

Intercollegiate basketball season

2009–10 Colorado Buffaloes women's basketball
- Conference: Big 12 Conference
- Head coach: Kathy McConnell-Miller
- Assistant coaches: Patrick Harrington; Tom McConnell; Aisha Veasley

The 2009–10 Colorado Buffaloes women's basketball team represented the University of Colorado in the 2009–10 NCAA Division I women's basketball season. The Buffaloes were members of the Big 12.

== Offseason ==
- July 7: Bianca Smith played basketball with a group from USA Athletes International, an organization that gives amateur athletes the opportunity to participate on an international stage. Smith teamed up with the three former Central Michigan Chippewas – Sharonda Hurd, Latisha Luckett and Angel Chan as well as Prairie View A&M’s Gaati Werema, IPFW’s Jordan Zuppe, Cornell’s Lauren Benson, Breynna Winkler of Gardner-Webb and Vanderbilt’s Jence Rhoads. In all, three teams – two women’s, one men's – were part of the USAAI travel party. Six of the seven games were played in Vienna at the Pentecost Tournament. The team played two games a day, competing against teams from all over Europe. After the three-day tournament, USAAI took a six-hour trip into the Czech Republic for a game there.
- July 21: University of Colorado sophomore forward Julie Seabrook will be playing for the Canada National Junior Team at the 2009 FIBA U19 World Championship for Women, to be contested July 23-August 2 in Bangkok, Thailand.

=== Freshmen ===
- April 16: Kailah Bailey has signed a National Letter of Intent to play basketball at the University of Colorado in 2009-10. Bailey is a 6-0 power forward from Omaha, Nebraska, was listed as the 9th best available unsigned player for 2009 according to the Collegiate Girls Basketball Report. Bailey is the fifth player in CU’s Class of 2009, joining Janeesa “Chucky” Jeffery, a 5-10 guard from Colorado Springs (Sierra High School), Brenna Malcolm-Peck, a 6-2 forward from Boulder (Horizon), Meagan Malcolm-Peck, a 6-2 forward from Boulder (Horizon) and Melissa MacFarlane, a 6-7 center from Omaha (Millard North). The 2009 class includes three Colorado signees. This is the largest contingent from the state to come to CU since 1997.

== Exhibition ==
Date	Location	Opponent	Score
Nov. 15	Boulder	UC-Irvine	61-56

== Regular season ==
=== Roster ===
Number	Name	Height	Position	Class
1	Alyssa Fressle	5-10	Guard	Sophomore
2	Bianca Smith	5-9	Guard	Senior
3	Whitney Houston	5-5	Guard	Junior
4	Britney Blythe	5-9	Guard	Junior
14	Meagan Malcolm-Peck	6-2	Guard-Forward	Freshman
15	Julie Seabrook	6-3	Forward	Sophomore
21	Chelsea Dale	6-1	Guard-Forward	Junior
22	Brittany Spears	6-1	Forward	Junior
23	Chucky Jeffery	5-10	Guard	Freshman
24	Breanna Malcolm-Peck	6-2	Guard-Forward	Freshman
32	Kelly-Jo Mullaney	5-8	Guard	Junior
34	Courtney Dunn	6-4	Center	Junior
42	Kailah Bailey	6-0	Forward	Freshman
55	Melissa MacFarlane	6-7	Center	Freshman

=== Schedule ===
- The Buffaloes participated in the Minnesota Tournament held on November 21 and 22. In addition, the Buffaloes hosted the 23rd Annual Coors Classic from November 27 to 28.

Date	Location	Opponent	Score	Leading Scorer	Record
Nov. 20	Minneapolis	Illinois-Chicago	63-49		1-0
Nov. 22	Minneapolis	Minnesota	78-87		1-1
Nov. 27	Boulder	Georgia Southern	62-50		2-1
Nov. 28	Boulder	Harvard	67-65		3-1
Dec. 2	Boulder	Denver	84-57		4-1
Dec. 6	Boulder	Seton Hall			
Dec. 11	Fort Collins, CO	Colorado State			
Dec. 19	Boulder	Southern Utah			
Dec. 22	Boulder	San Jose State			
Dec. 30	Boulder	Grambling State			
Jan. 2	Boulder	Virginia			
Jan. 4	Boulder	Yale			
Jan. 9	Boulder	Missouri			
Jan. 12	Lubbock, TX	Texas Tech			
Jan. 16	Boulder	Iowa State			
Jan. 20	Manhattan, KS	Kansas State			
Jan. 23	Boulder	Oklahoma State			
Jan. 27	Lawrence, KS	Kansas			
Jan. 30	Boulder	Nebraska			
Feb. 7	Waco, TX	Baylor			
Feb. 10	Boulder	Texas			
Feb. 13					
Feb. 16					
Feb. 20					
Feb. 23					
Feb. 27					
March 3					
March 6	Ames, Iowa	Iowa State			

==== Big 12 Tournament ====
Date	Location	Opponent	Buffaloes points	Opp. points	Record
March 11					

== Player stats ==
Player	Games played	Minutes	Field goals	Three Pointers	Free Throws	Rebounds	Assists	Blocks	Steals	Points
