= 2010 Women's National Invitation Tournament =

College basketball postseason tournament

- Season: 2009–10
- Teams: 64
- Finals site: Haas Pavilion, Berkeley, California
- Champions: California (1st title)
- Runner-up: Miami (FL) (1st title game)
- Winning coach: Charmin Smith (1st title)
- MVP: Alexis Gray-Lawson (California)
- Attendance: 2,523

The 2010 Women's National Invitation Tournament (WNIT) was a single-elimination tournament of 64 National Collegiate Athletic Association (NCAA) Division I teams that did not participate in the 2010 NCAA Division I women's basketball tournament. The tournament is played entirely on campus sites. The highest ranked team in each conference that did not receive a bid to the NCAA Tournament received an automatic bid to this tournament. The remaining slots were filled by the WNIT Selection Committee.

== 2010 Preseason WNIT ==
At the beginning of the season, there is a Preseason WNIT.

=== Round 1 ===
- The games for round one were played on November 13.

==== Bracket 1 ====
- New Mexico 81, Northern Colorado 59
- Florida Gulf Coast 66, UTEP 54
- Georgia Tech 63, Winthrop 30
- Oklahoma State 67, Arkansas Little-Rock 58

==== Bracket 2 ====
- Ohio State 91, Eastern Illinois 68
- Bowling Green 76, Chicago State 41
- Marist 80, North Carolina A&T 64
- West Virginia 79, Towson 42

=== Round 2 ===
- The games for round one were played on November 15 and 16.

==== Bracket 1 ====
- New Mexico 80, Florida Gulf Coast 64
- Oklahoma State 70, Georgia Tech 64

==== Bracket 2 ====
- Ohio State 91, Bowling Green 72
- West Virginia 55 Marist 50

=== Semifinals and finals ===
Semifinals; November 18–19
Ohio State	92
West Virginia	69
Oklahoma State	70
New Mexico	56

Finals; November 22
Ohio State	93
Oklahoma State	72

Note: Asterisk denotes home team.

=== Consolation rounds ===
==== Rounds 1&2 ====
- Friday, Nov. 20
  - North Carolina A&T 62, Chicago State 57
  - UTEP 84, Eastern Illinois 80
  - Towson 56, Winthrop 46
  - Arkansas-Little Rock 55, Northern Colorado 43
- Saturday, Nov. 21
  - Chicago State 45, Winthrop 41
  - Eastern Illinois 74, Northern Colorado 70
  - Towson 74, NCA&T 69
  - UALR 64, UTEP 40

==== Round 3 ====
- Saturday, November 21
  - Marist 70, Bowling Green 65
  - Georgia Tech 58, Florida Gulf Coast 48

== 2010 Postseason WNIT ==
The 2010 Women's National Invitation Tournament (WNIT) was a single-elimination tournament of 64 National Collegiate Athletic Association (NCAA) Division I teams that did not participate in the 2010 NCAA Division I women's basketball tournament. The 42nd annual tournament was played from March 17, 2010 to April 3, 2010, entirely on campus sites. The highest ranked team in each conference that did not receive a bid to the NCAA Tournament received an automatic bid to this tournament. The remaining slots were filled by the WNIT Selection Committee.

== Participants ==
=== Automatic bids ===
2010 WNIT automatic bids

Legend	School	Conference
1	Boston	America East
2	Charlotte	Atlantic 10
3	Wake Forest	Atlantic Coast
4	Florida Gulf Coast	Atlantic Sun
5	Texas Tech	Big 12
6	Providence	Big East
7	Eastern Washington	Big Sky
8	Gardner-Webb	Big South
9	Purdue	Big Ten
10	UC Davis	Big West
11	Old Dominion	Colonial
12	Houston	Conference USA
13	Butler	Horizon
14	Harvard	Ivy League
15	North Carolina A&T	MEAC
16	Iona	Metro Atlantic
17	Toledo	Mid-American
18	Illinois State	Missouri Valley
19	Brigham Young	Mountain West
20	Robert Morris	Northeast
21	Eastern Illinois	Ohio Valley
22	California	Pac-10
23	American	Patriot
24	Florida	SEC
25	Samford	Southern
26	Stephen F. Austin	Southland
27	Oral Roberts	Summit
28	Western Kentucky	Sun Belt
29	Prairie View A&M	SWAC
30	Nevada	WAC
31	Saint Mary's	West Coast

=== At-Large bids ===
Legend	School	Conference
1	Arizona State	Pac-10
2	Creighton	Missouri Valley
3	Delaware	Colonial
4	Drexel	Colonial
5	Duquesne	Atlantic 10
6	East Carolina	Conference USA
7	Eastern Michigan	Mid-American
8	Hofstra	Colonial
9	Illinois	Big Ten
10	Kansas	Big 12
11	Kent State	Mid-American
12	Marquette	Big East
13	Maryland	Atlantic Coast
14	Miami	Atlantic Coast
15	Michigan	Big Ten
16	Mississippi	SEC
17	Missouri State	Missouri Valley
18	New Mexico	Mountail West
19	New Mexico State	WAC
20	Northwestern	Big Ten
21	Oregon	Pac-10
22	Penn State	Big Ten
23	Pepperdine	West Coast
24	Pittsburgh	Big East
25	Richmond	Atlantic 10
26	Saint Joseph's	Atlantic 10
27	Southern Methodist	Conference USA
28	South Florida	Big East
29	St. Bonaventure	Atlantic 10
30	Syracuse	Big East
31	Utah	Mountain West
32	Virginia Commonwealth	Colonial
33	Wyoming	Mountain West

== Brackets ==
Results to date (* indicates game went to overtime):

=== Region 1 ===
First round March 17–21
Oregon	95
Eastern Washington	66
New Mexico	66
Southern Methodist	51
California	74*
UC Davis	69
St. Mary's	53
Utah	66
Arizona State	84
New Mexico St.	61
BYU	62
Pepperdine	58
Texas Tech	80
Houston	77
Wyoming	74
Nevada	53

Second round March 21–23
Oregon	93
New Mexico	67
California	64
Utah	54
Arizona State	53
BYU	61
Texas Tech	57
Wyoming	68*

Regional semifinals March 25
Oregon	57
California	71
BYU	67
Wyoming	63

Regional finals March 27
California	76
BYU	50

=== Region 2 ===
First round March 17–19
Illinois State	57
Butler	54
Purdue	56
Eastern Michigan	50
Kansas	82
Prairie View A&M	70
Creighton	76
Stephen F. Austin	65
Marquette	85
Eastern Illinois	56
Western Kentucky	51
Illinois	68
Missouri State	75
Oral Roberts	53
Samford	66
Mississippi	65

Second round March 21–22
Illinois State	59
Purdue	57
Kansas	71
Creighton	68
Marquette	72
Illinois	74*
Missouri State	75
Samford	54

Regional semifinals March 25
Illinois State	71
Kansas	51
Illinois	65
Missouri State	53

Regional finals March 28
Illinois State	53
Illinois	50

=== Region 3 ===
First round March 17–19
Maryland	88
Iona	53
Drexel	76
East Carolina	78*
Boston University	58
Providence	64
Old Dominion	63
American	55
Charlotte	74
Gardner-Webb	60
Wake Forest	49
North Carolina A&T	73
Florida	61
South Florida	54
Miami (FL)	70
Florida Gulf Coast	57

Second round March 21–22
Maryland	87
East Carolina	52
Providence	76
Old Dominion	61
Charlotte	70
North Carolina A&T	79
Florida	64
Miami (FL)	77

Regional semifinals March 25
Maryland	64
Providence	77
North Carolina A&T	77
Miami (FL)	84

Regional finals March 28
Providence	65
Miami (FL)	73

=== Region 4 ===
First round March 18–19
St. Bonaventure	76
Robert Morris	50
Northwestern	79
Duquesne	72
Michigan	69
Kent State	34
Toledo	70
Pittsburgh	58
Syracuse	87
Harvard	68
Delaware	49
Richmond	67
Saint Joseph's	63
VCU	74
Penn State	68
Hofstra	76

Second round March 21–22
St. Bonaventure	62
Northwestern	66
Michigan	72
Toledo	57
Syracuse	69
Richmond	55
VCU	84
Hofstra	65

Regional semifinals March 25–26
Northwestern	44
Michigan	65
Syracuse	74
VCU	59

Regional finals March 28
Michigan	78
Syracuse	52

=== Semifinals and championship game ===
Semifinals; March 31-April 1
California	61
Illinois State	45
Miami (FL)	76
Michigan	59

Championship; April 3 Haas Pavilion, Berkeley, California
California	73
Miami (FL)	61

== All-tournament team ==
- Alexis Gray-Lawson, California (MVP)
- DeNesha Stallworth, California
- Shenise Johnson, Miami (FL)
- Riquna Williams, Miami (FL)
- Nicolle Lewis, Illinois State
- Veronica Hicks, Michigan

== See also ==
- 2010 National Invitation Tournament
