= 2009–10 Mid-American Conference women's basketball season =

- League: NCAA Division I
- Sport: Basketball
- Teams: 12

Regular season
- Champions: Bowling Green
- Season MVP: Lauren Prochaska

Tournament
- Champions: Bowling Green
- Runners-up: Toledo
- Finals MVP: Lauren Prochaska

Mid-American women's basketball seasons

2009–10 Mid-American Conference women's basketball standings
	Conf.				Overall
Team	W		L	PCT	W		L	PCT
Bowling Green †	14	–	2	.875	27	–	6	.818
Kent State	12	–	4	.750	20	–	10	.667
Akron	11	–	5	.688	18	–	13	.581
Miami (OH)	6	–	10	.375	9	–	22	.290
Ohio	4	–	12	.250	8	–	22	.267
Buffalo	3	–	13	.188	7	–	23	.233
West
Toledo	12	–	4	.750	24	–	8	.750
Eastern Michigan	11	–	5	.688	22	–	8	.733
Central Michigan	8	–	8	.500	12	–	18	.400
Ball State	7	–	9	.438	14	–	17	.452
Northern Illinois	4	–	12	.250	10	–	19	.345
Western Michigan	4	–	12	.250	9	–	21	.300
† 2010 MAC tournament winner Rankings from AP poll

The 2009–10 Mid-American Conference women's basketball season began with practices in October 2009, followed by the start of the 2009–10 NCAA Division I women's basketball season in November. Conference play began in January 2010 and concluded in March 2010. Bowling Green won the regular season title with a record of 14–2 by two games over Toledo and Kent State. Lauren Prochaska of Bowling Green was named MAC player of the year.

Top seeded Bowling Green won the MAC tournament over second seeded Toledo. Lauren Prochaska of Bowling Green was the tournament MVP. Bowling Green lost to Michigan State in the first round of the NCAA tournament. Toledo, Eastern Michigan, Kent State, and Akron played in the WNIT.

== Preseason awards ==
The preseason poll was announced by the league office on October 28, 2009.

=== Preseason women's basketball poll ===
(First place votes in parentheses)

==== East Division ====
1. Bowling Green (22)
2. Kent State (12)
3. Miami (2)
4. Akron
5. Ohio
6. Buffalo

==== West Division ====
1. Toledo (18)
2. Ball State (14)
3. Northern Illinois (4)
4. Central Michigan
5. Eastern Michigan
6. Western Michigan

==== Tournament champs ====
Bowling Green

=== Honors ===
Honor	Recipient
Preseason All-MAC East	Kara Murphy, Akron
Preseason All-MAC East	Lauren Prochaska, Bowling Green
Preseason All-MAC East	Tracy Pontius, Bowling Green
Preseason All-MAC East	Kourtney Brown, Buffalo
Preseason All-MAC East	Jennifer Bushby, Ohio
Preseason All-MAC West	Danielle Gratton, Ball State
Preseason All-MAC West	Emily Maggert, Ball State
Preseason All-MAC West	Britni Houghton, Central Michigan
Preseason All-MAC West	Naama Shafir, Toledo
Preseason All-MAC West	Tanika Mays, Toledo

== Postseason ==
=== Postseason awards ===
1. Coach of the Year: Jodi Kest, Akron
2. Player of the Year: Lauren Prochaska, Bowling Green
3. Freshman of the Year: Courtney Osborn, Miami
4. Defensive Player of the Year: Kourtney Brown, Buffalo
5. Sixth Man of the Year: Rachel Tecca, Akron

=== Honors ===
Honor	Recipient
Postseason All-MAC First Team	Lauren Prochaska, Bowling Green
Postseason All-MAC First Team	Kourtney Brown, Buffalo
Postseason All-MAC First Team	Tavelyn James, Eastern Michigan
Postseason All-MAC First Team	Jamilah Humes, Kent State
Postseason All-MAC First Team	Tanika Mays, Toledo
Postseason All-MAC Second Team	Kara Murphy, Akron
Postseason All-MAC Second Team	Emily Maggert, Ball State
Postseason All-MAC Second Team	Tracy Pontius, Bowling Green
Postseason All-MAC Second Team	Marke Freeman, Northern Illinois
Postseason All-MAC Second Team	Naama Shafir, Toledo
Postseason All-MAC Third Team	Britni Houghton, Central Michigan
Postseason All-MAC Third Team	Shonda Long, Central Michigan
Postseason All-MAC Third Team	Kaihla Szunko, Central Michigan
Postseason All-MAC Third Team	Taisja Jones, Kent State
Postseason All-MAC Third Team	Courtney Osborn, Miami
Postseason All-MAC Honorable Mention	Kyle Baumgartner, Akron
Postseason All-MAC Honorable Mention	Audrey McDonald, Ball State
Postseason All-MAC Honorable Mention	Jennifer Bushby, Ohio
Postseason All-MAC Honorable Mention	Melissa Goodall, Toledo
Postseason All-MAC Honorable Mention	Miame Giden, Western Michigan
All-MAC Freshman Team	Rachel Tecca, Akron
All-MAC Freshman Team	Abby Dowd, Buffalo
All-MAC Freshman Team	Rachel Mauk, Central Michigan
All-MAC Freshman Team	Kirsten Olowinski, Miami
All-MAC Freshman Team	Courtney Osborn, Miami

== See also ==
2009–10 Mid-American Conference men's basketball season
