= 2009–10 NCAA Division I women's basketball season =

Intercollegiate basketball season

- Regular season: November, 2009 – March 9, 2010
- NCAA Tournament: 2010
- Tournament dates: March 21, 2010 – April 6, 2010
- National Championship: Alamodome; San Antonio, Texas
- NCAA Champions: Connecticut Huskies
- Other champions: California Golden Bears (WNIT); Appalachian State Mountaineers (WBI)
- Player of the Year (Naismith, Wooden): Tina Charles, Connecticut Huskies (Naismith, Wooden); Maya Moore, Connecticut Huskies (Wade)

The 2009–10 NCAA Division I women's basketball season began in November 2009 and ended with the 2010 NCAA Women's Division I Basketball Tournament's championship game on April 6, 2010 at the Alamodome in San Antonio. The tournament opened with the first and second rounds on Thursday through Sunday, March 18–21, 2010. Regional games were played on Thursday through Sunday, March 28–31, 2010, with the Final Four played on Sunday and Tuesday, April 4 and 6, 2010.

The Connecticut Huskies successfully defended their national title from the previous season, defeating Stanford 53–47 in the final. This was the Huskies' second consecutive unbeaten championship season, unprecedented since the NCAA began to organize women's basketball in the 1981–82 season.

== Season headlines ==
- May 4: The tenth annual 2009 US Virgin Islands Paradise Jam is a women's basketball tournament that took place on November 26–28, 2009. Eight teams from the NCAA were invited to participate in the tournament. The teams were separated into two brackets, the Reef Division and the Island Division. The Reef Division consisted of Mississippi State, Rutgers, Southern California and Texas. The Island Division consisted of Notre Dame, Oklahoma, San Diego State and South Carolina.
- May 5: The Atlantic Coast Conference and the Big Ten Conference announced the pairings for the annual Big Ten/ACC Challenge for women's basketball, which was in the third year of a four-year agreement. The 2009 Challenge, which took on a two-day format this year, opened on Wednesday, December 2. The Big Ten/ACC Women's Basketball Challenge matches 11 teams from each conference in head-to-head competition, traditionally on the first Wednesday, Thursday and Friday after Thanksgiving, following the men's basketball Big Ten/ACC Challenge. The Big Ten and ACC have been among the most successful conferences in women's basketball. During the 2008–09 season, the ACC was represented by six teams in the NCAA Women's Basketball Championship. This was the seventh straight year that the league had at least six teams in the tournament. Maryland advanced to the 2009 NCAA Regional Finals, giving the ACC at least one team in the Elite Eight for the eighth consecutive year. In 2005–06, the ACC became the first conference to send three teams – Duke, Maryland and North Carolina – to the same Final Four. Overall, the ACC has made 11 Final Four trips, including six in the past 13 years.
- May 28, 2009: NBA referee Violet Palmer was hired as coordinator of women's basketball officials for the West Coast Conference and was to remain with the NBA, where she had worked for 12 seasons.
- July 1: Rutgers played in the eighth annual Jimmy V Women's Classic when the Scarlet Knights host Florida on December 7. This marked the fourth straight season that the Scarlet Knights took part in the game. They beat Georgia 45-34 in the previous season. The games are part of the fundraising effort for the V Foundation for Cancer Research, named for the late Jim Valvano, who led North Carolina State to the national championship in 1983.
- July 7: Pat Summitt and C. Vivian Stringer opposed each other in the fourth annual Maggie Dixon Classic. The women's doubleheader was played on December 13 at Madison Square Garden. The two Hall of Fame coaches teams met in regular season play for the seventh straight year. Baylor and freshman star Brittney Griner faced Boston College in the other contest. The two teams had played once before at Madison Square Garden. Tennessee won 68–54 in 1999. Baylor made its first appearance at MSG.
- August 4: Joan Bonvicini was introduced as the new women's basketball coach at Seattle University. She is one of only 18 coaches in Division I history with more than 600 victories.
- August 18: On January. 16, Notre Dame and Connecticut were part of the first-ever ESPN women's basketball College GameDay broadcast. The game was broadcast from Gampel Pavilion in Storrs, Connecticut. The matchup between the Fighting Irish and Huskies tipped off at 9 p.m. (ET) and was televised live to a national cable audience by ESPN.
- September 8: The West Coast Conference (WCC) and its multi-media rights partner, IMG College, announced Zappos.com as the official title sponsor of the WCC Men's and Women's Basketball Championships. The deal was effective through the 2011–12 season, and signified the WCC's first-ever title sponsorship.

== Preseason ==
=== Preseason "Wade Watch" list ===
On July 30, the Women's Basketball Coaches Association (WBCA), on behalf of the Wade Coalition, announced the 2009–2010 preseason "Wade Watch" list for the State Farm Wade Trophy Division I Player of the Year. The nominees were top NCAA Division I student-athletes who best embody the spirit of Lily Margaret Wade. This is based on the following criteria: game and season statistics, leadership, character, effect on their team and overall playing ability. The list is as follows:

- Jayne Appel, Stanford
- Jessica Breland, North Carolina
- Tina Charles, Connecticut
- Alysha Clark, Middle Tennessee
- Allyssa DeHaan, Michigan State
- Alexis Gray-Lawson, California
- Tiffany Hayes, Connecticut
- Allison Hightower, LSU
- Ashley Houts, Georgia
- Jantel Lavender, Ohio State
- Danielle McCray, Kansas
- Jacinta Monroe, Florida State
- Maya Moore, Connecticut
- Jené Morris, San Diego State
- Deirdre Naughton, DePaul
- Kayla Pedersen, Stanford
- Ta'Shia Phillips, Xavier
- Jeanette Pohlen, Stanford
- Samantha Prahalis, Ohio State
- Andrea Riley, Oklahoma State
- Danielle Robinson, Oklahoma
- Jenna Smith, Illinois
- Carolyn Swords, Boston College
- Courtney Vandersloot, Gonzaga
- Monica Wright, Virginia

=== Preseason Wooden Award nominees ===
August 21: The 2009–10 preseason candidates list for the Women's Wooden Award was released, naming 31 student athletes.

Name	Height	Class	Position	School
Jayne Appel	6-4	Sr.	F/C	Stanford
Erica Beverly	6-0	Sr.	F	Hartford
Angie Bjorklund	6-0	Jr.	G/F	Tennessee
Heather Bowman	6-2	Sr.	F	Gonzaga
Jessica Breland*	6-3	Sr.	F	North Carolina
Tina Charles	6-4	Sr.	C	Connecticut
Alysha Clark	5-10	Sr.	F	Middle Tennessee
Allyssa DeHaan	6-9	Sr.	C	Michigan State
Tyra Grant	5-11	Sr.	G	Penn State
Alexis Gray-Lawson	5-8	Sr.	G	California
Allison Hightower	5-10	Sr.	G	LSU
Ashley Houts	5-6	Sr.	G	Georgia
Ify Ibekwe	6-1	Jr.	F	Arizona
Jantel Lavender	6-4	Jr.	C	Ohio State
Gabriela Marginean	6-1	Sr.	F	Drexel
Danielle McCray	5-11	Sr.	G/F	Kansas
Nicole Michael	6-2	Sr.	F	Syracuse
Jacinta Monroe	6-4	Sr.	F/C	Florida State
Maya Moore	6-0	Jr.	F	Connecticut
Jené Morris	5-9	Sr.	G	San Diego State
Dierdre Naughton	5-10	Sr.	G	DePaul
Ta‘Shia Phillips	6-6	Jr.	C	Xavier
Jeanette Pohlen	6-0	Jr.	G	Stanford
Samantha Prahalis	5-7	So.	G	Ohio State
Andrea Riley	5-5	Sr.	G	Oklahoma State
Danielle Robinson	5-9	Jr.	G	Oklahoma
Jenna Smith	6-3	Sr.	C	Illinois
Ashley Sweat	6-2	Sr.	F	Kansas State
Carolyn Swords	6-6	Jr.	C	Boston College
Courtney Vandersloot	5-8	Jr.	G	Gonzaga
Monica Wright	5-11	Sr.	G	Virginia

=== Preseason WNIT ===
Ohio State headlines a field of 16 teams for the 2009 Preseason Women's National Invitation Tournament. The field includes 11 teams that played in the postseason the previous spring: Arkansas-Little Rock, Bowling Green, Florida Gulf Coast, Georgia Tech, Marist, New Mexico, North Carolina A&T, Ohio State, Oklahoma State, West Virginia, and Winthrop. They were joined in the Preseason WNIT field by Chicago State, Eastern Illinois, Northern Colorado, Towson, and UTEP.

The Preseason WNIT featured a three-game guarantee format. The event opened Friday, November 13 with first-round games. Second-round games were played November 15 and 16. The semifinals were on November 18 and 19. The championship was set for Sunday, November 22. Teams that lose in the first two rounds would play consolation games on the second weekend, November 20–22. All games were hosted by participating schools, and sites were announced by the end of the preceding round. In last year's Preseason WNIT, North Carolina defeated Oklahoma 80-79.

- First-round Preseason WNIT games to be held on Friday, November 13, 2009
  - Eastern Illinois (24-9) at Ohio State (29-6), 5 p.m. ET
  - UTEP (18-12) at Florida Gulf Coast (26-5), 7 p.m. ET
  - Arkansas-Little Rock (26-7) at Oklahoma State (17-16), 7 p.m. ET
  - Towson (17-13) at West Virginia (18-15), 7 p.m. ET
  - Winthrop (16-16) at Georgia Tech (22-10), 7:30 p.m. ET
  - Chicago State (16-13) at Bowling Green (29-5), 7:30 p.m. ET
  - North Carolina A&T (26-7) at Marist (29-4), 7:30 p.m. ET
  - Northern Colorado (12-18) at New Mexico (25-11), 9 p.m. ET

== Season outlook ==
Nov. 11: The Big Ten and Big 12 Conferences announced the formation of an annual inter-conference challenge for women's basketball. The challenge was to span at least two years, and began in the fall of 2010. The series would feature a home-and-home format over the initial two-year agreement, and each of the Big 12's teams would play in each challenge, while one Big Ten team, Wisconsin, will play two challenge games each year.

=== Pre-season polls ===
Associated Press
Ranking	School	Points
1	Connecticut	1000
2	Stanford	951
3	Ohio State	862
4	Notre Dame	799
5	North Carolina	798
6	Duke	772
7	Baylor	744
8	Tennessee	676
9	LSU	600
10	Michigan State	521
11	Xavier	492
12	Texas	487
13	Oklahoma	444
14	Virginia	394
15	Florida State	385
16	Arizona State	317
17	DePaul	301
18	California	294
19	Georgia Tech	262
20	Kansas	241
21	Georgia	201
22	Vanderbilt	165
23	Louisville	156
24	Middle Tennessee	143
25	Rutgers	138

USA Today
Ranking	School	Points
1	Connecticut	775
2	Stanford	739
3	Ohio State	653
4	Baylor	649
5	North Carolina	561
6	Duke	547
7	Notre Dame	438
8	Oklahoma	416
9	Tennessee	412
10	Michigan State	353
11	Arizona State	328
12	Florida State	323
13	California	314
14	Texas	311
15	Xavier	303
16	Texas A&M	302
17	LSU	298
18	Virginia	246
19	Louisville	232
20	Vanderbilt	223
21	Maryland	209
22	Pittsburgh	127
23	Purdue	126
24	Iowa State	125
25	DePaul	121

=== Preseason All-Americans ===
- Jayne Appel, Stanford
- Tina Charles, Connecticut
- Jantel Lavender, Ohio State
- Maya Moore, Connecticut
- Monica Wright, Virginia
- November 3: Maya Moore became just the seventh unanimous choice on the Associated Press' preseason All-America team. She received all 40 votes from a national media panel. This was the third straight year a player had been a unanimous choice in the preseason. Moore was joined on the preseason squad by teammate Tina Charles. This was the fifth time that two players from the same team made the All-America squad. Connecticut has also had two of the four other pairs of teammates on a preseason team – Jen Rizzotti and Kara Wolters in 1995–96, and Shea Ralph and Svetlana Abrosimova in 2000–01.

=== Preseason All-Conference teams ===
==== Big Ten ====
- 2009–10 Big Ten Preseason Player of the Year
  - Jantel Lavender
- Preseason All-Big Ten Coaches Team
  - Jenna Smith, Sr., F, ILL
  - Allyssa DeHaan, Sr., C, MSU
  - Jantel Lavender, Jr., C, OSU
  - Samantha Prahalis, So., G, OSU
  - Tyra Grant, Sr., F, PSU
- Preseason All-Big Ten Media Team
  - Jenna Smith, Sr., F, ILL
  - Allyssa DeHaan, Sr., C, MSU
  - Jantel Lavender, Jr., C, OSU
  - Samantha Prahalis, So., G, OSU
  - Tyra Grant, Sr., F, PSU

==== Conference USA ====
- 2009–10 C-USA Preseason Player of the Year
  - Emma Cannon, UCF
- 2009–10 C-USA Preseason Team
  - Courtney Taylor, Houston
  - Brittany Gilliam, SMU
  - Pauline Love, Southern Miss
  - Emma Cannon, UCF
  - Jareica Hughes, UTEP

== Regular season ==
=== 2009 Big Ten/ACC Challenge schedule ===
Date	Visiting team	Home team	Score	Leading scorer	Attendance
Dec. 2/09	Georgia Tech	Penn State	G Tech 64-60	Tyra Grant, PSU (20)	TBD
Dec. 2/09	Illinois	Wake Forest	Illinois, 65-50	Jenna Smith, Illinois (27)	TBD
Dec. 2/09	Boston College	Iowa	BC, 72-67	Kamilee Wahlin, Iowa (23)	TBD
Dec. 3/09	Michigan	Virginia Tech	Mich, 71-51	Veronica Hicks, Michigan (19)	TBD
Dec. 3/09	Clemson	Northwestern	CLEM, 69-68	Kirstyn Wright, Clemson (22)	TBD
Dec. 3/09	Minnesota	Maryland	MD, 66-45	Kim Rodgers, Maryland (14)	TBD
Dec. 3/09	North Carolina	Michigan State	MSU, 72-66	Italee Lucas, North Carolina (29)	TBD
Dec. 3/09	Ohio State	Duke	Duke, 83-67	Jasmine Thomas, Duke (29)	TBD
Dec. 3/09	Purdue	Virginia	VA, 56-49	Brittany Rayburn, Purdue (19)	TBD
Dec. 3/09	Florida State	Indiana	FSU, 82-74	Jori Davis, Indiana (23)	TBD
Dec. 3/09	Wisconsin	NC State	Wisc, 53-48	Taylor Wurtz, Wisconsin (13)	TBD

=== Early season tournaments ===
Name	Dates	Num. teams	Location	Championship
Aggie Hotel Encato Classic	Nov. 27-28	4	Las Cruces, New Mexico	New Mexico State Aggies
ASU Classic	Dec. 4-5	4	Tempe, Arizona	
Bahamas Tournament	Dec. 19-20	4	Nassau, Bahamas	
Basketball Travelers Tip-Off Tournament	Nov. 27-29	4	Lubbock, Texas	
Big Easy Classic	Dec. 4-5	4	New Orleans, Louisiana	
BTI Classic	Nov. 20-22	4	West Lafayette, Ind.	Dayton Flyers
BTI Tip-Off Tournament	Nov. 27-28			
Buckeye Classic	Nov. 28-29	4	Columbus, Ohio	Ohio State Buckeyes
Cal Poly Holiday Beach Classic	Nov. 28-29	4	San Luis Obispo, California	Illinois Fighting Illini
Caribbean Challenge	Nov. 26-27	4	Cancún, Mexico	Duke Blue Devils
Commerce Bank Wildcat Classic	Dec. 4			
Desert Sun Classic	Dec. 19-20	4	Las Vegas	
Great Alaska Shootout	Nov. 24-25	4	Anchorage	Alaska-Anchorage Seawolves
Holiday Inn & Suites Express Thanksgiving Tournament	Nov. 27-28	4	Albuquerque, New Mexico	Toledo Rockets
Hukilau Tournament	Dec. 4-5		Laie, Hawai'I	
Iona Tip-Off Tournament	Nov. 14-15	4	New Rochelle, New York	Arizona Wildcats
Jack in the Box Rainbow Wahine Classic	Nov. 27-29	4	Honolulu, HI	Arizona State Sun Devils
Junkanoo Jam	Nov. 27-28		Bahamas	Michigan State Spartans
KCRG-TV9 Hawkeye Challenge	Nov. 14-15	4	Iowa City, Iowa	Iowa Hawkeyes
Lady Eagle Thanksgiving Classic	Nov 27-28	4	Hattiesburg, Mississippi	Georgia Lady Bulldogs
Las Vegas Hoops Classic (Duel in the Desert)	Dec. 19-20	4	Las Vegas	Baylor Lady Bears
LIU Thanksgiving Tournament	Nov. 27-28	4	Brooklyn, New York	Georgia Tech Yellow Jackets
Maggie Dixon Classic	Dec. 13	2	New York	Baylor Lady Bears
Maine Classic	Nov. 27-28	4	Orono, Maine	Penn State Lady Lions
Mildred and Roger L. White Invitational	Nov. 29-Dec. 2		Evanston, Ill.	
Navy Classic	Nov. 20-21	2	Annapolis, Maryland	Navy Midshipmen
Northwestern Tournament	Nov. 27-28	4	Evanston, Ill.	Iowa State Cyclones
Nugget Classic	Nov. 7-8	4	Reno, Nevada	West Virginia Mountaineers
Omni Hotels Classic	Nov. 27-28		Boulder, Colorado	Colorado Buffaloes
Paradise Jam Tournament	Nov. 25-28	8	US Virgin Islands	Notre Dame Fighting Irish
Saint Mary's Hilton Tournament	Nov. 27-29	4	Moraga, California	Nebraska Cornhuskers
San Diego Surf and Slam	Dec. 28-30		San Diego, California	
Seminole Classic	Nov. 27-29	4	Tallahassee, Florida	Florida State Seminoles
SMU Tournament	Nov. 27-28	4	Dallas, Texas	Boston College Eagles
Subway Basketball Classic	Nov. 21-22	4	Minneapolis	Minnesota Golden Gophers
Terrapin Classic	Dec. 27-29		College Park, Maryland	
Tulane DoubleTree Classic	Dec. 28-29	4	New Orleans, Louisiana	
University of Miami Thanksgiving Tournament	Nov. 27-28	4	Coral Gables, Florida	Miami Hurricanes
University of Miami Holiday Tournament	Dec. 28-29		Coral Gables, Florida	
Vanderbilt Thanksgiving Tournament	Nov. 27-28	4	Nashville, Tennessee	Vanderbilt Commodores
Villanova Tournament	Dec. 28-29		Villanova, Pennsylvania	
Waikiki Beach Marriott Classic	Dec. 29-30		Honolulu, HI	
WBCA Classic	Nov. 27-Nov. 29	4		Connecticut Huskies
Women of Troy Classic	Dec. 19 – Dec. 20		Galen Center	
World Vision Classic	Nov. 27-Nov. 29	4	Waco, Texas	Baylor Lady Bears
World Vision Invitational	Nov. 27-Nov. 29	4	Eugene, Oregon	Wisconsin Badgers

=== Conference winners and tournaments ===
Thirty athletic conferences each end their regular seasons with a single-elimination tournament. The teams in each conference that win their regular season title are given the number one seed in each tournament, with tiebreakers applied if more than one team tops the season standings. In the table below, if teams tied for the regular-season title, the first team listed won the tiebreaker for top seed in the tournament.

The winners of these tournaments receive automatic invitations to the 2010 NCAA Women's Division I Basketball Tournament. The Ivy League does not have a conference tournament, instead giving their automatic invitation to their regular-season champion. The Great West Conference began play in 2009–10 and does not receive an automatic bid to the NCAA tournament.

Conference	Regular season winner	Conference Player of the Year	Conference tournament	Tournament venue (city)	Tournament winner
America East Conference	Hartford	Diana Delva, Hartford	2010 America East women's basketball tournament	All games before final at Chase Family Arena (West Hartford, Connecticut); Final at highest remaining seed	Vermont
Atlantic 10 Conference	Xavier	Amber Harris, Xavier	2010 Atlantic 10 women's basketball tournament	The Show Place Arena (Upper Marlboro, Maryland)	Xavier
Atlantic Coast Conference	Duke & Florida State	Monica Wright, Virginia	2010 ACC women's basketball tournament	Greensboro Coliseum (Greensboro, North Carolina)	Duke
Atlantic Sun Conference	East Tennessee State	Siarre Evans, East Tennessee State	2010 Atlantic Sun women's basketball tournament	University Center (Macon, Georgia)	East Tennessee State
Big 12 Conference	Nebraska	Kelsey Griffin, Nebraska	2010 Big 12 women's basketball tournament	Municipal Auditorium (Kansas City, Missouri)	Texas A&M
Big East Conference	Connecticut	Tina Charles, Connecticut	2010 Big East women's basketball tournament	XL Center (Hartford, Connecticut)	Connecticut
Big Sky Conference	Eastern Washington	Julie Piper, Eastern Washington	2010 Big Sky women's basketball tournament	Reese Court (Cheney, Washington)	Portland State
Big South Conference	Gardner–Webb	Margaret Roundtree, Gardner–Webb	2010 Big South Conference women's basketball tournament	Millis Center (High Point, North Carolina)	Liberty
Big Ten Conference	Ohio State	Jantel Lavender, Ohio State (coaches and media)	2010 Big Ten Conference women's basketball tournament	Conseco Fieldhouse (Indianapolis)	Ohio State
Big West Conference	UC Davis	Kristina Santiago, Cal Poly	2010 Big West Conference women's basketball tournament	Anaheim Convention Center (Anaheim, California)	UC Riverside
Colonial Athletic Association	Old Dominion	Elena Delle Donne, Delaware	2010 CAA women's basketball tournament	JMU Convocation Center (Harrisonburg, Virginia)	James Madison
Conference USA	Tulane	Courtney Taylor, Houston	2010 Conference USA women's basketball tournament	Reynolds Center (Tulsa, Oklahoma)	Tulane
Great West Conference	North Dakota	Kayla Bagaason, North Dakota	2010 Great West Conference women's basketball tournament	McKay Events Center (Orem, Utah)	Utah Valley
Horizon League	Green Bay	Melanie Thornton, Butler	2010 Horizon League women's basketball tournament	First round and quarterfinals at campus sites, Final Four at Kress Events Center (Green Bay, Wisconsin)	Cleveland State
Ivy League	Princeton	Judie Lomax, Columbia	No tournament		
Metro Atlantic Athletic Conference	Marist	Rachele Fitz, Marist	2010 MAAC women's basketball tournament	Times Union Center (Albany, New York)	Marist
Mid-American Conference	Bowling Green (East & overall); Toledo (West)	Lauren Prochaska, Bowling Green	2010 MAC women's basketball tournament	Quicken Loans Arena (Cleveland, Ohio)	Bowling Green
Mid-Eastern Athletic Conference	North Carolina A&T	Corin Adams, Morgan State	2010 MEAC women's basketball tournament	Lawrence Joel Veterans Memorial Coliseum (Winston-Salem, North Carolina)	Hampton
Missouri Valley Conference	Illinois State	Casey Garrison, Missouri State	2010 Missouri Valley Conference women's basketball tournament	The Family Arena (St. Charles, Missouri)	Northern Iowa
Mountain West Conference	TCU	Helena Sverrisdóttir, TCU	2010 MWC women's basketball tournament	Thomas & Mack Center (Paradise, Nevada)	San Diego State
Northeast Conference	Robert Morris	Angela Pace, Robert Morris	2010 Northeast Conference women's basketball tournament	Quarterfinals and semifinals at DeGol Arena (Loretto, Pennsylvania); Final at highest remaining seed	Saint Francis
Ohio Valley Conference	Eastern Illinois	Chynna Bozeman, Morehead State	2010 Ohio Valley Conference women's basketball tournament	First round at campus sites, Final Four at Bridgestone Arena (Nashville, Tennessee)	Austin Peay
Pacific-10 Conference	Stanford	Nnemkadi Ogwumike, Stanford (coaches and media)	2010 Pacific-10 Conference women's basketball tournament	Galen Center (Los Angeles)	Stanford
Patriot League	Lehigh & American	Michelle Kirk, American	2010 Patriot League women's basketball tournament	Quarterfinals and semifinals at Hart Center (Worcester, Massachusetts); Final at highest remaining seed	Lehigh
Southeastern Conference	Tennessee	Victoria Dunlap, Kentucky	2010 SEC women's basketball tournament	Arena at Gwinnett Center (Duluth, Georgia)	Tennessee
Southern Conference	Chattanooga	Shanara Hollinquest, Chattanooga (coaches and media)	2010 Southern Conference women's basketball tournament	Bojangles' Coliseum (first two rounds); Time Warner Cable Arena (semifinals and final) (Charlotte, North Carolina)	Chattanooga
Southland Conference	Stephen F. Austin (East); Lamar (West & overall #1 seed by tiebreaker)	Jenna Plumley, Lamar	2010 Southland Conference women's basketball tournament	Leonard E. Merrell Center (Katy, Texas)	Lamar
Southwestern Athletic Conference	Southern	Katrich Williams, Alabama A&M	2010 SWAC women's basketball tournament	CenturyTel Center (Bossier City, Louisiana)	Southern
The Summit League	Oral Roberts	Kevi Luper, Oral Roberts	2010 Summit League women's basketball tournament	Sioux Falls Arena (Sioux Falls, South Dakota)	South Dakota State
Sun Belt Conference	Middle Tennessee (East); UALR (West & overall #1 seed by tiebreaker)	Alysha Clark, Middle Tennessee	2010 Sun Belt women's basketball tournament	Summit Arena (Hot Springs, Arkansas)	Middle Tennessee
West Coast Conference	Gonzaga	Courtney Vandersloot, Gonzaga	2010 West Coast Conference women's basketball tournament	Orleans Arena (Paradise, Nevada)	Gonzaga
Western Athletic Conference	Fresno State	Shanavia Dowdell, Louisiana Tech	2010 WAC women's basketball tournament	Lawlor Events Center (Reno, Nevada)	Louisiana Tech

== Post-season tournaments ==
=== Women's Basketball Invitational ===
This season saw the debut of a third national postseason tournament in the Women's Basketball Invitational, a 16-team affair with all games played on home courts.

The inaugural title was won by Appalachian State, who came back from a 19-point deficit to defeat Memphis 79–71 in the final held on the Mountaineers' home floor in Boone, North Carolina.

== Awards and honors ==
=== Major player of the year awards ===
- Wooden Award: Tina Charles, Connecticut
- Naismith Award: Tina Charles, Connecticut
- Wade Trophy: Maya Moore, Connecticut

=== Major coach of the year awards ===
- Kay Yow Award: Connie Yori, Nebraska
- Maggie Dixon Award: Teresa Weatherspoon, Louisiana Tech
- Naismith College Coach of the Year: Connie Yori, Nebraska
- WBCA National Coach of the Year: Connie Yori, Nebraska

=== Other major awards ===
- Nancy Lieberman Award (best point guard): Andrea Riley, Oklahoma State
- Frances Pomeroy Naismith Award (best player 5'8"/1.73 m or shorter): Alexis Gray-Lawson, California
- Lowe's Senior CLASS Award (top senior): Kelsey Griffin, Nebraska

== Conference standings ==
2009–10 America East Conference women's basketball standings
	Conf.				Overall
Team	W		L	PCT	W		L	PCT
Hartford	16	–	0	1.000	27	–	5	.844
Vermont †	13	–	3	.813	27	–	7	.794
Boston U.	11	–	5	.688	16	–	15	.516
Stony Brook	7	–	9	.438	10	–	20	.333
Binghamton	7	–	9	.438	11	–	19	.367
UMBC	7	–	9	.438	13	–	17	.433
Albany	4	–	12	.250	11	–	19	.367
Maine	4	–	12	.250	8	–	21	.276
New Hampshire	3	–	13	.188	9	–	22	.290
† 2010 America East tournament winner

2009–10 ACC women's basketball standings
	Conf.				Overall
Team	W		L	PCT	W		L	PCT
Duke	12	–	2	.857	30	–	6	.833
Florida State	12	–	2	.857	29	–	6	.829
Virginia	9	–	5	.643	21	–	10	.677
Georgia Tech	8	–	6	.571	23	–	10	.697
North Carolina State	7	–	7	.500	20	–	14	.588
Wake Forest	7	–	7	.500	18	–	14	.563
North Carolina	6	–	8	.429	19	–	12	.613
Boston College	6	–	8	.429	17	–	15	.531
Maryland	5	–	9	.357	21	–	13	.618
Miami	4	–	10	.286	22	–	14	.611
Virginia Tech	4	–	10	.286	15	–	15	.500
Clemson	4	–	10	.286	13	–	18	.419
† 2010 ACC Tournament winner Rankings from AP Poll

2009–10 Big 12 Conference women's basketball standings
	Conf.				Overall
Team	W		L	PCT	W		L	PCT
No. 4 Nebraska	16	–	0	1.000	32	–	2	.941
No. 16 Iowa State	11	–	5	.688	25	–	8	.758
No. 12 Oklahoma	11	–	5	.688	27	–	11	.711
No. 9 Texas A&M †	10	–	6	.625	26	–	8	.765
No. 17 Texas	10	–	6	.625	22	–	11	.667
No. 14 Baylor	9	–	7	.563	27	–	10	.730
No. 20 Oklahoma State	9	–	7	.563	24	–	11	.686
Texas Tech	5	–	11	.313	18	–	15	.545
Kansas State	5	–	11	.313	14	–	18	.438
Kansas	5	–	11	.313	17	–	16	.515
Colorado	3	–	13	.188	13	–	17	.433
Missouri	2	–	14	.125	12	–	18	.400
† 2010 Big 12 Tournament winner Rankings from AP poll

2009–10 Big East Conference women's basketball standings
	Conf.				Overall
Team	W		L	PCT	W		L	PCT
Connecticut	16	–	0	1.000	39	–	0	1.000
West Virginia	13	–	3	.813	29	–	6	.829
Georgetown	13	–	3	.813	26	–	7	.788
St. John's	12	–	4	.750	25	–	7	.781
Notre Dame	12	–	4	.750	29	–	6	.829
Rutgers	9	–	7	.563	19	–	15	.559
DePaul	9	–	7	.563	21	–	12	.636
Providence	7	–	9	.438	19	–	15	.559
Syracuse	7	–	9	.438	25	–	11	.694
Marquette	6	–	10	.375	17	–	16	.515
South Florida	6	–	10	.375	15	–	16	.484
Pittsburgh	5	–	11	.313	16	–	15	.516
Louisville	5	–	11	.313	14	–	18	.438
Cincinnati	4	–	12	.250	12	–	18	.400
Villanova	3	–	13	.188	14	–	16	.467
Seton Hall	1	–	15	.063	9	–	21	.300
† 2010 Big East tournament winner

2009–10 Big Ten women's basketball standings
	Conf.				Overall
Team	W		L	PCT	W		L	PCT
No. 8 Ohio State†	15	–	3	.833	31	–	5	.861
No. 24 Michigan State	12	–	6	.667	23	–	10	.697
Wisconsin	10	–	8	.556	21	–	11	.656
Iowa	10	–	8	.556	20	–	14	.588
Purdue	9	–	9	.500	15	–	17	.469
Michigan	8	–	10	.444	20	–	13	.606
Penn State	8	–	10	.444	17	–	14	.548
Illinois	7	–	11	.389	19	–	14	.576
Northwestern	7	–	11	.389	18	–	15	.545
Indiana	7	–	11	.389	14	–	16	.467
Minnesota	6	–	12	.333	13	–	17	.433
† 2010 Big Ten tournament winner As of 3-27-2010; Rankings from AP Poll

2009–10 Mid-American Conference women's basketball standings
	Conf.				Overall
Team	W		L	PCT	W		L	PCT
Bowling Green †	14	–	2	.875	27	–	6	.818
Kent State	12	–	4	.750	20	–	10	.667
Akron	11	–	5	.688	18	–	13	.581
Miami (OH)	6	–	10	.375	9	–	22	.290
Ohio	4	–	12	.250	8	–	22	.267
Buffalo	3	–	13	.188	7	–	23	.233
West
Toledo	12	–	4	.750	24	–	8	.750
Eastern Michigan	11	–	5	.688	22	–	8	.733
Central Michigan	8	–	8	.500	12	–	18	.400
Ball State	7	–	9	.438	14	–	17	.452
Northern Illinois	4	–	12	.250	10	–	19	.345
Western Michigan	4	–	12	.250	9	–	21	.300
† 2010 MAC tournament winner Rankings from AP poll

2009–10 Pacific-10 Conference women's basketball standings
	Conf.				Overall
Team	W		L	PCT	W		L	PCT
No. 2 Stanford †	18	–	0	1.000	36	–	2	.947
No. 23 UCLA	15	–	3	.833	25	–	9	.735
USC	12	–	6	.667	19	–	12	.613
California	11	–	7	.611	24	–	13	.649
Arizona State	9	–	9	.500	18	–	14	.563
Oregon	7	–	11	.389	18	–	16	.529
Washington	7	–	11	.389	13	–	18	.419
Arizona	6	–	12	.333	14	–	17	.452
Washington State	3	–	15	.167	8	–	22	.267
Oregon State	2	–	16	.111	11	–	20	.355
† 2010 Pacific-10 Tournament winner As of April 6, 2010; Rankings from AP Poll

2009–10 SEC women's basketball standings
	Conf.				Overall
Team	W		L	PCT	W		L	PCT
No. 3 Tennessee^{†}	15	–	1	.938	32	–	3	.914
No. 19 Kentucky	11	–	5	.688	28	–	8	.778
Mississippi State	9	–	7	.563	21	–	13	.618
No. 21 LSU	9	–	7	.563	21	–	10	.677
Vanderbilt	9	–	7	.563	23	–	11	.676
No. 23 Georgia	9	–	7	.563	25	–	9	.735
Florida	7	–	9	.438	15	–	17	.469
South Carolina	7	–	9	.438	14	–	15	.483
Ole Miss	7	–	9	.438	17	–	15	.531
Auburn	5	–	11	.313	15	–	16	.484
Alabama	4	–	12	.250	12	–	18	.400
Arkansas	4	–	12	.250	12	–	18	.400
† 2010 SEC tournament winner Rankings from AP poll

2009–10 Sun Belt Conference women's basketball standings
	Conf.				Overall
Team	W		L	PCT	W		L	PCT
East Division
Middle Tennessee†	17	–	1	.944	25	–	6	.806
Western Kentucky	14	–	4	.778	21	–	11	.656
Florida Atlantic	10	–	8	.556	14	–	15	.483
FIU	9	–	9	.500	14	–	16	.467
South Alabama	9	–	9	.500	15	–	16	.484
Troy	5	–	13	.278	12	–	17	.414
West Division
Arkansas–Little Rock	17	–	1	.944	27	–	6	.818
Denver	12	–	6	.667	18	–	13	.581
Arkansas State	7	–	11	.389	13	–	18	.419
North Texas	5	–	13	.278	9	–	22	.290
New Orleans	4	–	14	.222	12	–	20	.375
Louisiana–Monroe	4	–	14	.222	10	–	19	.345
Louisiana–Lafayette	4	–	14	.222	10	–	22	.313
† Tournament winner Rankings from Coaches

== See also ==
- 2009–10 NCAA Division I women's basketball rankings
- 2010 NCAA Women's Division I Basketball Tournament
- 2009–10 ACC women's basketball season
- 2009–10 Big Ten Conference women's basketball season
- 2009–10 NCAA Division I men's basketball season
- 2009–10 NCAA Division I women's ice hockey season
