= 2009–10 Minnesota Golden Gophers women's basketball team =

Intercollegiate basketball season

2009–10 Minnesota Golden Gophers women's basketball

Subway Basketball Classic champions
- Conference: Big Ten
- Record: 13–17 (6–12 Big 10)
- Head coach: Pam Borton
- Assistant coaches: Barb Smith; Ted Riverso
- Home arena: Williams Arena

2009–10 Big Ten women's basketball standings
	Conf.				Overall
Team	W		L	PCT	W		L	PCT
No. 8 Ohio State†	15	–	3	.833	31	–	5	.861
No. 24 Michigan State	12	–	6	.667	23	–	10	.697
Wisconsin	10	–	8	.556	21	–	11	.656
Iowa	10	–	8	.556	20	–	14	.588
Purdue	9	–	9	.500	15	–	17	.469
Michigan	8	–	10	.444	20	–	13	.606
Penn State	8	–	10	.444	17	–	14	.548
Illinois	7	–	11	.389	19	–	14	.576
Northwestern	7	–	11	.389	18	–	15	.545
Indiana	7	–	11	.389	14	–	16	.467
Minnesota	6	–	12	.333	13	–	17	.433
† 2010 Big Ten tournament winner As of 3-27-2010; Rankings from AP Poll

The 2009–10 Minnesota Golden Gophers women's basketball team represented the University of Minnesota in the 2009–10 NCAA Division I women's basketball season. The Golden Gophers were coached by Pam Borton. The Golden Gophers, a member of the Big Ten Conference, finished last in the conference standings and did not advance to any national postseason tournament.

== Offseason ==
- May 5: The 2009–10 season will mark the third year of the Big Ten-ACC Basketball Challenge. On Thursday, December 3, the Golden Gopher will travel to Maryland to play the Maryland Terrapins.

== Exhibition ==
Date	Location	Opponent	Score	Record
Nov. 4	Williams Arena	Winona State	62-84	0-1
Nov. 8	Williams Arena	Minnesota-Duluth	77-45	1-1

== Regular season ==
=== Roster ===
Number	Name	Height	Position	Class

=== Schedule ===
Date	Location	Opponent	Score	Leading Scorer	Record
Nov. 15	Williams Arena	Lamar	84-45		1-0
Nov. 17	Salt Lake City	Utah	59-60		1-1
Nov. 21	Williams Arena	Illinois-Chicago	94-58		2-1
Nov. 22	Williams Arena	Colorado	87-78		3-1
Nov. 24	Williams Arena	North Dakota State	65-37		4-1
Nov. 27	Grand Island, Bahamas	TCU	61-56		5-1
Nov. 28	Grand Island, Bahamas	Xavier	56-71		5-2
Dec. 3	College Park, MD	Maryland	45-66		5-3
Dec. 6	Williams Arena	Penn State	56-48		6-3
Dec.					

== Player stats ==
Player	Games played	Minutes	Field goals	Three pointers	Free throws	Rebounds	Assists	Blocks	Steals	Points

== Team players drafted into the WNBA ==
Round	Pick	Player	NBA club

== See also ==
- 2009–10 Minnesota Golden Gophers women's ice hockey team
