= 2009–10 Wisconsin Badgers women's basketball team =

Intercollegiate basketball season

2009–10 Wisconsin Badgers women's basketball

World Vision Invitational champions

NCAA tournament, first round
- Conference: Big Ten Conference
- Record: 21–11 (10–8 Big 10)
- Head coach: Lisa Stone
- Assistant coaches: Kathi Bennett; Oties Epps; Ty Margenthaler

2009–10 Big Ten women's basketball standings
	Conf.				Overall
Team	W		L	PCT	W		L	PCT
No. 8 Ohio State†	15	–	3	.833	31	–	5	.861
No. 24 Michigan State	12	–	6	.667	23	–	10	.697
Wisconsin	10	–	8	.556	21	–	11	.656
Iowa	10	–	8	.556	20	–	14	.588
Purdue	9	–	9	.500	15	–	17	.469
Michigan	8	–	10	.444	20	–	13	.606
Penn State	8	–	10	.444	17	–	14	.548
Illinois	7	–	11	.389	19	–	14	.576
Northwestern	7	–	11	.389	18	–	15	.545
Indiana	7	–	11	.389	14	–	16	.467
Minnesota	6	–	12	.333	13	–	17	.433
† 2010 Big Ten tournament winner As of 3-27-2010; Rankings from AP Poll

The 2009–10 Wisconsin Badgers women's basketball team represented the University of Wisconsin in the 2009–10 NCAA Division I women's basketball season. The Badgers, coached by Lisa Stone, finished tied for third in the Big Ten Conference. They received an at-large bid to the NCAA tournament, where they lost in the first round to Vermont.

== Offseason ==
- May 5: The Wisconsin women's basketball team will hit the road next year for the third annual Big Ten Conference/Atlantic Coast Conference Challenge. The Badgers travel to Raleigh, N.C., on Thursday, Dec. 3 to take on North Carolina State for just the second time in school history. Wisconsin is 1-1 all-time in the Big Ten/ACC Challenge.
- July 28: Senior Teah Gant, junior Alana Trotter and sophomore Anya Covington have been named tri-captains of the University of Wisconsin women's basketball team for the upcoming season.

== Regular season ==
- Nov. 11: The Big Ten and Big 12 Conferences announced the formation of an annual inter-conference challenge for women's basketball. The challenge will span at least two years and will begin in the fall of 2010. The series will feature a home-and-home format over the initial two-year agreement, and each of the Big 12's teams will play in each Challenge, while one Big Ten team, Wisconsin, will play two Challenge games each year.
- The Badgers will compete in the BTI Tip-Off Tournament from November 27 – 29.

=== Roster ===
Number	Name	Height	Position	Class
00	Jade Davis			
1	Jamie Russell			
3	Emily Neal			
4	Tara Steinbauer			
11	Rae Lin D'Alie			
13	Teah Gant			
15	Alana Trotter			
23	Ashley Thomas			
30	Alyssa Karel			
33	Lin Zastrow			
40	Anya Covington			

=== Schedule ===
Date	Opponent	Location	Arena	Score
11/8/2009 1:30 PM	UW–Oshkosh	Madison WI	Kohl Center	106-39
11/15/2009 12:00 PM	North Dakota	Madison WI	Kohl Center	68-43
11/19/2009 7:00 PM	Milwaukee	Milwaukee WI	Klotsche Center	64-55
11/22/2009 4:00 PM	Cleveland State	Madison WI	Kohl Center	70-68
11/24/2009 8:00 PM	Green Bay	Madison WI	Kohl Center	58-60
11/27/2009 7:00 PM	Portland State	Eugene OR	McArthur Court	75-51
11/28/2009 6:30 PM	Oregon	Eugene OR	McArthur Court	58-57
11/29/2009 2:00 PM	Cal State Fullerton	Eugene OR	McArthur Court	57-44
12/3/2009 6:00 PM	NC State	Raleigh NC	Reynolds Coliseum	
12/6/2009 1:00 PM	Ohio State	Columbus OH	Jerome Schottenstein Center Value City Arena	
12/11/2009 7:00 PM	Marquette	Milwaukee WI	Al McGuire Center	
12/13/2009 4:00 PM	SIU-Edwardsville	Madison WI	Kohl Center	
12/15/2009 7:00 PM	Robert Morris	Madison WI	Kohl Center	
12/28/2009 7:00 PM	Michigan State	Madison WI	Kohl Center	
12/31/2009 5:00 PM	Iowa	Iowa City IA	Carver-Hawkeye Arena	
1/3/2010 3:00 PM	Illinois	Champaign IL	Assembly Hall	
1/7/2010 6:30 PM	Purdue	Madison WI	Kohl Center	
1/10/2010 1:00 PM	Michigan	Madison WI	Kohl Center	
1/14/2010 6:00 PM	Michigan State	East Lansing MI	Breslin Student Events Center	
1/17/2010 1:00 PM	Illinois	Madison WI	Kohl Center	
1/21/2010 7:00 PM	Penn State	Madison WI	Kohl Center	
1/28/2010 6:00 PM	Indiana	Bloomington IN	Assembly Hall	
1/31/2010 4:00 PM	Northwestern	Madison WI	Kohl Center	
2/4/2010 7:00 PM	Minnesota	Minneapolis MN	The Sports Pavilion	
2/7/2010 1:00 PM	Purdue	West Lafayette IN	Mackey Arena	
2/14/2010 TBA	Indiana	Madison WI	Kohl Center	
2/18/2010 7:00 PM	Ohio State	Madison WI	Kohl Center	
2/21/2010 12:00 PM	Michigan	Ann Arbor MI	Crisler Arena	
2/25/2010 TBA	Penn State	University Park PA	Bryce Jordan Center	
2/28/2010 TBA	Iowa	Madison WI	Kohl Center	

== Player stats ==
Player	Games Played	Minutes	Field goals	Three Pointers	Free Throws	Rebounds	Assists	Blocks	Steals	Points

== Postseason ==
=== Big Ten tournament ===
Date	Opponent	Location	Arena	Score
3/4/2010 TBA	2010 Big Ten Tournament Indianapolis IN	Conseco Fieldhouse		

== Team players drafted into the WNBA ==
Round	Pick	Player	WNBA club

== See also ==
- 2009–10 Big Ten women's basketball season
- 2009–10 NCAA Division I women's basketball season
- 2009–10 NCAA Division I women's basketball season
- 2009–10 Wisconsin Badgers women's ice hockey season
