= 2009–10 Penn State Lady Lions basketball team =

Intercollegiate basketball season

2009–10 Penn State Lady Lions basketball

Maine Classic Champions

WNIT, first round
- Conference: Big Ten
- Record: 17–14 (9–11 Big Ten)
- Head coach: Coquese Washington
- Assistant coaches: Itoro Coleman; Kia Damon; Maren Walseth
- Home arena: Bryce Jordan Center

2009–10 Big Ten women's basketball standings
	Conf.				Overall
Team	W		L	PCT	W		L	PCT
No. 8 Ohio State†	15	–	3	.833	31	–	5	.861
No. 24 Michigan State	12	–	6	.667	23	–	10	.697
Wisconsin	10	–	8	.556	21	–	11	.656
Iowa	10	–	8	.556	20	–	14	.588
Purdue	9	–	9	.500	15	–	17	.469
Michigan	8	–	10	.444	20	–	13	.606
Penn State	8	–	10	.444	17	–	14	.548
Illinois	7	–	11	.389	19	–	14	.576
Northwestern	7	–	11	.389	18	–	15	.545
Indiana	7	–	11	.389	14	–	16	.467
Minnesota	6	–	12	.333	13	–	17	.433
† 2010 Big Ten tournament winner As of 3-27-2010; Rankings from AP Poll

The 2009–10 Penn State Lady Lions basketball team represented Pennsylvania State University in the 2009–10 NCAA Division I women's basketball season. It was the 46th season of Lady Lions basketball. The Lady Lions, a member of the Big Ten Conference, finished the season tied for sixth in the conference. They advanced to the WNIT, losing in the first round to Hofstra.

== Offseason ==
- July 21: Julia Trogele recently completed her stint playing with the U20 German National team at the 2009 European U20 Women's Championships in Poland. The Germans finished in eighth place in the tournament, a marked improvement from the 12th-place finish last year. In nine games, Trogele finished second on the team with a 10.7 scoring average. She also led the Germans in rebounding (6.4), steals (1.9) and blocks (0.6). She connected on 46.3% of her shots (37–80) and 88% of her free throws (22–25).
- July 23: Basketball head coach Coquese Washington gave birth to a baby girl. Her name is Rhaiyna Kamille Brown. Her daughter was born at 2:40 p.m. on July 23, is 20.5 inches long and weighs seven pounds, five ounces.
- August 21: The 2009–10 preseason candidates list for the Women's Wooden Award was released, naming 31 student athletes. Tyra Grant from Penn State was one of the candidates.

== Regular season ==
=== Roster ===
Mia Nickson sat out the season due to NCAA transfer rules. Tyra Grant and Julia Trogele are the only starters from the previous season that returned.

Number	Name	Height	Position	Class
1	Tyra Grant	5–11	Guard	Senior
2	Emily Phillips	5–4	Guard	Sophomore
11	Julia Trogele	6–2	Guard/Forward	Junior
12	Zhaque Gray	5–8	Guard	Sophomore
15	Renee Womack	5–10	Guard	Sophomore
20	Alex Bentley	5–7	Guard	Freshman
22	Nicole Arcidiacono	5–9	Guard	Senior
23	Meggan Quinn	5–8	Guard	Senior
24	Mia Nickson	6–2	Forward	Redshirt Sophomore
25	Gizelle Studevent	5–11	Guard	Freshman
33	Meredith Monroe	6–1	Forward	Senior
40	Marisa Wolfe	6–2	Forward	Freshman
42	Janessa Wolff	6–3	Center	Junior
54	Nikki Greene	6–4	Center	Freshman

=== Schedule ===
The Nittany Lions competed in the Maine Classic from November 27–28. The WBCA Pink Zone at Penn State was held on January 24.

== Schedule and results ==
Date time, TV	Rank^{#}	Opponent^{#}	Result	Record	Site city, state
Exhibition
November 8*; 2:00 p.m., Penn State Radio Network		Indiana Univ. (Pa)	W 67–49	–	Bryce Jordan Center; University Park, PA
Regular season
November 13*; 7:00 p.m., Penn State Radio Network		at Drexel	W 71–61	1–0	Daskalakis Athletic Center; Philadelphia, PA
November 15*; 2:00 p.m., BigTenNetwork.com		NJIT	W 79–57	2–0	Bryce Jordan Center; University Park, PA
November 19*; 7:00 p.m., Penn State Radio Network		at Bucknell	W 77–62	3–0	Sojka Pavilion; Lewisburg, PA
November 22*; 3:00 p.m., SportSouth		at South Carolina	L 56–63	3–1	Colonial Life Arena; Columbia, SC
November 27*; 4:00 p.m., Penn State Radio Network		vs. Buffalo; Maine Classic	W 86–65	4–1	Orono, ME
November 28*; 2:00 p.m., Penn State Radio Network		vs. Holy Cross; Maine Classic	W 52–48	5–1	Orono, ME
December 2*; 6:30 p.m., Big Ten Network		Georgia Tech	L 60–64	5–2	Bryce Jordan Center; University Park, PA
December 6; 4:00 p.m., Big Ten Network		at Minnesota	L 48–56	5–3 (0–1)	Williams Arena; Minneapolis, MN
December 9*; 7:00 p.m., BigTenNetwork.com		Monmouth	W 67–42	6–3 (0–1)	Bryce Jordan Center; University Park, PA
December 12*; 1:00 p.m., Big Ten Network		No. 15 Pittsburgh	W 77–73	7–3 (0–1)	Bryce Jordan Center; University Park, PA
December 21*; 7:30 p.m., BigTenNetwork.com		Oakland	W 69–64	8–3 (0–1)	Bryce Jordan Center; University Park, PA
December 28; 7:00 p.m., BigTenNetwork.com		Iowa	W 77–73 ^{OT}	9–3 (1–1)	Bryce Jordan Center; University Park, PA
December 31; 3:00 p.m., Big Ten Network		at Illinois	L 60–69	9–4 (1–2)	Assembly Hall; Champaign, IL
January 3; 3:00 p.m., Penn State Radio Network		at Northwestern	W 88–68	10–4 (2–2)	Welsh-Ryan Arena; Evanston, IL
January 10; 12:00 p.m., Big Ten Network		Indiana	W 77–71 ^{OT}	11–4 (3–2)	Bryce Jordan Center; University Park, PA
January 14; 8:00 p.m., BigTenNetwork.com		at Iowa	W 68–62	12–4 (4–2)	Carver-Hawkeye Arena; Iowa City, IA
January 17; 1:00 p.m., BigTenNetwork.com		No. 20 Michigan State	W 68–60	13–4 (5–2)	Bryce Jordan Center; University Park, PA
January 21; 8:00 p.m., BigTenNetwork.com		at Wisconsin	W 54–43	14–4 (6–2)	Kohl Center; Madison, WI
January 24; 1:00 p.m., BigTenNetwork.com		Illinois	W 70–66	15–4 (7–2)	Bryce Jordan Center; University Park, PA
January 28; 7:00 p.m., BigTenNetwork.com	No. 23	Purdue	L 76–80 ^{OT}	15–5 (7–3)	Bryce Jordan Center; University Park, PA
January 31; 1:00 p.m., BigTenNetwork.com	No. 23	at Michigan	L 62–66	15–6 (7–4)	Crisler Arena; Ann Arbor, MI
February 4; 7:00 p.m., BigTenNetwork.com		at Michigan State	L 44–65	15–7 (7–5)	Breslin Center; East Lansing, MI
February 7; 1:00 p.m., BigTenNetwork.com		No. 8 Ohio State	L 73–86	15–8 (7–6)	Bryce Jordan Center; University Park, PA
February 11; 7:00 p.m., BigTenNetwork.com		Minnesota	L 52–59	15–9 (7–7)	Bryce Jordan Center; University Park, PA
February 14; 2:00 p.m., BigTenNetwork.com		at Purdue	L 59–63	15–10 (7–8)	Mackey Arena; West Lafayette, IN
February 18; 6:30 p.m., Big Ten Network		Michigan	W 71–65 ^{OT}	16–10 (8–8)	Bryce Jordan Center; University Park, PA
February 25; 7:00 p.m., BigTenNetwork.com		Wisconsin	L 39–71	16–11 (8–9)	Bryce Jordan Center; University Park, PA
February 28; 4:00 p.m., Big Ten Network		at Indiana	L 68–77	16–12 (8–10)	Assembly Hall; Bloomington, IN
Big Ten tournament
March 4; 2:30 p.m., Big Ten Network		vs. Minnesota; Big Ten tournament first round	W 63–52	17–12 (9–10)	Conseco Fieldhouse; Indianapolis, IN
March 5; 2:00 p.m., Big Ten Network		vs. Iowa; Big Ten tournament Quarterfinals	L 75–82	17–13 (9–11)	Conseco Fieldhouse; Indianapolis, IN
WNIT
March 18*; 7:00 p.m., BigTenNetwork.com		Hofstra; WNIT First Round	L 68–76	17–14 (9–11)	Bryce Jordan Center; University Park, PA
*Non-conference game. ^{#}Rankings from AP Poll. (#) Tournament seedings in parentheses.

== Player stats ==
Player	Games played	Minutes	Field goals	Three pointers	Free throws	Rebounds	Assists	Blocks	Steals	Points

== Awards and honors ==
=== Preseason All-Big Ten Coaches Team ===
- Tyra Grant, Sr., F, PSU

=== Preseason All-Big Ten Media Team ===
- Tyra Grant, Sr., F, PSU

== Team players drafted into the WNBA ==
Round	Pick	Player	NBA club
