= 2009–10 Iowa Hawkeyes women's basketball team =

Intercollegiate basketball season

2009–10 Iowa Hawkeyes women's basketball

KCRG-TV9 Hawkeye Challenge champions

NCAA tournament, second round
- Conference: Big Ten
- Record: 20–14 (10–8 Big 10)
- Head coach: Lisa Bluder
- Assistant coaches: Jan Jensen; Jenni Fitzgerald; Shannon Gage
- Home arena: Carver-Hawkeye Arena

2009–10 Big Ten women's basketball standings
	Conf.				Overall
Team	W		L	PCT	W		L	PCT
No. 8 Ohio State†	15	–	3	.833	31	–	5	.861
No. 24 Michigan State	12	–	6	.667	23	–	10	.697
Wisconsin	10	–	8	.556	21	–	11	.656
Iowa	10	–	8	.556	20	–	14	.588
Purdue	9	–	9	.500	15	–	17	.469
Michigan	8	–	10	.444	20	–	13	.606
Penn State	8	–	10	.444	17	–	14	.548
Illinois	7	–	11	.389	19	–	14	.576
Northwestern	7	–	11	.389	18	–	15	.545
Indiana	7	–	11	.389	14	–	16	.467
Minnesota	6	–	12	.333	13	–	17	.433
† 2010 Big Ten tournament winner As of 3-27-2010; Rankings from AP Poll

The 2009–10 Iowa Hawkeyes women's basketball team represented the University of Iowa in the 2009–10 NCAA Division I women's basketball season. The Hawkeyes were members of the Big Ten Conference.

== Offseason ==
- May 5: The University of Iowa women's basketball team hosted Boston College as part of the third annual Big Ten/ACC Challenge. The game was held at Carver-Hawkeye Arena on Dec. 2. This was to be the first-ever meeting between Iowa and Boston College. Overall, Iowa is 9–4 against teams from the ACC.

== Exhibition ==
Date	Opponent	Location	Time	Score	Record
11/08/09	vs. Washburn (Exhibition)	Iowa City, IA	TBA	88–60	

== Regular season ==
The Hawkeyes will host the KCRG-TV9 Hawkeye Challenge from November 14–15. Illinois State, UCLA and Santa Clara are the other teams. From November 27–28, the Hawkeyes will compete in the Nugget Classic. The Hy-Vee Cy-Hawk Series will resume against Iowa State on December 10.

=== Roster ===
Number	Name	Height	Position	Class
2	Kamille Wahlin	5'8"	Guard	Sophomore
4	Megan Considine	5'8"	Guard	Sophomore
11	Trisha Nesbitt	5'6"	Guard	Freshman
12	Morgan Johnson	6'5"	Center	Freshman
20	Kelly Krei	6'2"	Forward	Sophomore
21	Kachine Alexander	5'9"	Guard	Junior
22	Kelsey Cermak	6'1"	Forward	Junior
23	Theairra Taylor	5'11"	Guard	Freshman
24	Jaime Printy	5'11"	Guard	Freshman
31	Hannah Draxten	6'0"	Guard/Forward	Sophomore
32	Jade Rogers	6'0"	Forward	Freshman
45	JoAnn Hamlin	6'3"	Forward/Center	Senior
50	Gabby Machado	6'0"	Forward	Freshman

=== Schedule ===
Date	Opponent (Ranking)	Location	Time	Result	Record
11/14/09	vs. Santa Clara	Iowa City, IA	TBA	W 67–51	1–0
11/15/09	vs. Illinois State	Iowa City, IA	5:00pm	W 75–67	2–0
11/18/09	vs. Kansas	Iowa City, IA	7:00pm	L 55–66	L 2–1
11/22/09	at Northern Iowa	Cedar Falls, IA	TBA	W 81–70	3–1
11/24/09	vs. William & Mary	Iowa City, IA	TBA	W 78–54	4–1
11/27/09	at West Virginia	Reno, NV	TBA	L 66–69	4–2
11/28/09	at Columbia	Reno, NV	TBA	W 72–69	5–2
12/02/09	vs. Boston College	Iowa City, IA	7:30pm	L 67–72	5–3
12/06/09	vs. Michigan	Iowa City, IA	5:00pm	L 54–51	5–4 (0–1)
12/10/09	at Iowa State	Ames, IA	TBA	L 85–66	5–5
12/20/09	vs. Drake University	Iowa City, IA	1:00pm	W 73–61	6–5
12/22/09	vs. South Dakota St.	Iowa City, IA	TBA	W 82–69	7–5
12/28/09	at Penn State	University Park, PA	TBA	L 77–73	7–6 (0–2)
12/31/09	vs. Wisconsin	Iowa City, IA	5:00pm	W 61–51	8–6 (1–2)
01/03/10	at Minnesota	Minneapolis, MN	TBA	L 72–69	8–7 (1–3)
01/07/10	at Michigan	Ann Arbor, MI	TBA	L 63–46	8–8 (1–4)
01/14/10	vs. Penn State	Iowa City, IA	7:00pm	L 68–62	8–9 (1–5)
01/17/10	at Purdue	West Lafayette, IN	11:00am	L 81–59	8–10 (1–6)
01/21/10	at Illinois	Champaign, IL	TBA	W 74–65	9–10 (2–6)
01/24/10	vs. Northwestern	Iowa City, IA	4:00pm	W 78–69	10–10 (3–6)
01/31/10	vs. Purdue	Iowa City, IA	2:00pm	W 70–50	11–10 (4–6)
02/04/10	at Ohio State (9)	Columbus, OH	6:30pm	L 86–82	11–11 (4–7)
02/07/10	vs. Michigan State	Iowa City, IA	3:30pm		
02/11/10	at Indiana	Bloomington, IN	TBA		
02/14/10	vs. Illinois	Iowa City, IA	2:00pm		
02/18/10	vs. Minnesota	Iowa City, IA	6:30pm		
02/21/10	at Northwestern	Evanston, IL	TBA		
02/25/10	vs. Indiana	Iowa City, IA	7:00pm		
02/28/10	at Wisconsin	Madison, WI	TBA		

== Postseason ==
=== Big Ten tournament ===
Iowa went into the 2009–2010 Big Ten Tournament with a 17–12 (9–8) record and was seeded 3rd.

Date	Round	Opponent (Seed)	Location	Time	Result	Record
03/04/10	First Round	Bye	Indianapolis, IN			17–12 (9–8)
03/05/10	Quarterfinals	vs. Penn State (6)	Indianapolis, IN	1:00pm	W 82–75	18–12 (10–8)
03/06/10	Semifinals	at Michigan State (2)	Indianapolis, IN	4:00pm	W 59–54	19–12 (10–8)
03/07/10	Finals	at Ohio State (1)	Indianapolis, IN	3:30pm	L 66–64	19–13 (10–8)

=== NCAA basketball tournament ===
Iowa was invited to the 2009–2010 NCAA Division I women's basketball tournament. They were seeded 8th in the Sacramento Division

Date	Round	Opponent (Seed)	Location	Time	Result	Record
03/20/10	First Round	vs. Rutgers (9)	Stanford, CA	7:16pm	W 70–63	20–13
03/22/10	Second Round	at Stanford (1)	Stanford, CA	8:35pm	L 96–67	20–14

== See also ==
- 2009–10 Big Ten women's basketball season
