= 2010 MEAC women's basketball tournament =

- Classification: Division I
- Season: 2009–10
- Site: Lawrence Joel Veterans Memorial Coliseum; Winston-Salem, North Carolina
- Champions: Hampton University Pirates (4th title)
- Winning coach: David Six (1st title)
- MVP: Melanie Warner (Hampton University)
- Television: ESPN2

The 2010 Mid-Eastern Athletic Conference women's basketball tournament took place March 9–13, 2010, at the Lawrence Joel Veterans Memorial Coliseum in Winston-Salem, North Carolina. The tournament champion, The Hampton University Lady Pirates, received an automatic berth to the NCAA Division I women's basketball tournament. The 2009-2010 MEAC regular season champions, The North Carolina A&T Lady Aggies, earned the No. 1 seed and an early round bye.

== Bracket ==
Opening Round
7	Maryland - Eastern Shore	52
10	Delaware State	45
6	Bethune-Cookman	76
11	Norfolk State	66
8	South Carolina State	54
9	Coppin State	49

Quarterfinals
7	Maryland - Eastern Shore	41
2	Hampton University	65
6	Bethune-Cookman	63
3	Morgan State	52
4	Howard University
5	FAMU
8	South Carolina State	61
1	North Carolina A&T	60

Semifinals
2	Hampton University
6	Bethune-Cookman
4	Howard University	50
8	South Carolina State	63

Championship
2	Hampton University	57
8	South Carolina State	46
