= 2010 MAC women's basketball tournament =

- Classification: Division I
- Season: 2009–10
- Teams: 12
- Site: Quicken Loans Arena; Cleveland, Ohio
- Champions: Bowling Green
- Winning coach: Curt Miller
- MVP: Lauren Prochaska (Bowling Green)
- MAC women's basketball tournaments

2009–10 Mid-American Conference women's basketball standings
	Conf.				Overall
Team	W		L	PCT	W		L	PCT
Bowling Green †	14	–	2	.875	27	–	6	.818
Kent State	12	–	4	.750	20	–	10	.667
Akron	11	–	5	.688	18	–	13	.581
Miami (OH)	6	–	10	.375	9	–	22	.290
Ohio	4	–	12	.250	8	–	22	.267
Buffalo	3	–	13	.188	7	–	23	.233
West
Toledo	12	–	4	.750	24	–	8	.750
Eastern Michigan	11	–	5	.688	22	–	8	.733
Central Michigan	8	–	8	.500	12	–	18	.400
Ball State	7	–	9	.438	14	–	17	.452
Northern Illinois	4	–	12	.250	10	–	19	.345
Western Michigan	4	–	12	.250	9	–	21	.300
† 2010 MAC tournament winner Rankings from AP poll

The 2010 Mid-American Conference women's basketball tournament was the post-season basketball tournament for the Mid-American Conference (MAC) 2009–10 college basketball season. The 2010 tournament was held March 6–13, 2010. Top seeded Bowling Green won the championship over second seeded Toledo. Lauren Prochaska of Bowling Green was the MVP.

== Format ==
The top four seeds received byes into the quarterfinals. The winners of each division were awarded the #1 and #2 seeds. The team with the best record of the two receives the #1 seed. First round games will be played on campus sites at the higher seed. The remaining rounds were held at Quicken Loans Arena.

== Seeds ==
Seed	School	Conference record	Division
1†	Bowling Green	14–2	East
2†	Toledo	12–4	West
3†	Kent State	12–4	East
4†	Akron	11–5	East
5	Eastern Michigan	11–5	West
6	Central Michigan	8–8	West
7	Ball State	7–9	West
8	Miami	6–10	East
9	Northern Illinois	4–12	West
10	Western Michigan	4–12	West
11	Ohio	4–12	East
12	Buffalo	3–13	East
† – Received a Bye to quarterfinals. Overall record are as of the end of the regular season.

== Bracket ==
First round Campus sites March 5
8	Miami	67
9	Northern Illinois	66
5	Eastern Michigan	66
12	Buffalo	56
7	Ball State	67
10	Western Michigan	43
6	Central Michigan	69
11	Ohio	66

Quarterfinals; Quicken Loans Arena; March 9
1	Bowling Green	91
8	Miami	58
4	Akron	72
5	Eastern Michigan	46
2	Toledo	67
7	Ball State	56
3	Kent State	68
6	Central Michigan	55

Semifinals; Quicken Loans Arena; March 11
1	Bowling Green	81
4	Akron	49
2	Toledo	51
3	Kent State	49

Championship game Quicken Loans Arena; March 12
1	Bowling Green	62
2	Toledo	53

== All-Tournament Team ==
Tournament MVP – Lauren Prochaska, Bowling Green

Player	Team
Jamilah Humes	Kent State
Naama Shafir	Toledo
Tanika Mays	Toledo
Tara Breske	Bowling Green
Lauren Prochaska	Bowling Green
