= 2009–10 Big Ten Conference women's basketball season =

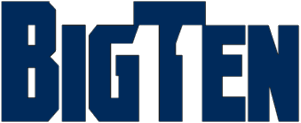
- League: NCAA Division I
- Sport: Basketball
- Duration: December 2009 through March, 2010
- Teams: 11
- TV partner(s): Big Ten Network, ESPN

Regular Season
- Champion: TBD
- Runners-Up: TBD
- Season MVP: TBD
- Top scorer: TBD

Tournament
- Champions: Ohio State
- Runners-up: Iowa
- Finals MVP: TBD

Basketball seasons
- 08–09 10–11

2009–10 Big Ten women's basketball standings
	Conf.				Overall
Team	W		L	PCT	W		L	PCT
No. 8 Ohio State†	15	–	3	.833	31	–	5	.861
No. 24 Michigan State	12	–	6	.667	23	–	10	.697
Wisconsin	10	–	8	.556	21	–	11	.656
Iowa	10	–	8	.556	20	–	14	.588
Purdue	9	–	9	.500	15	–	17	.469
Michigan	8	–	10	.444	20	–	13	.606
Penn State	8	–	10	.444	17	–	14	.548
Illinois	7	–	11	.389	19	–	14	.576
Northwestern	7	–	11	.389	18	–	15	.545
Indiana	7	–	11	.389	14	–	16	.467
Minnesota	6	–	12	.333	13	–	17	.433
† 2010 Big Ten tournament winner As of 3-27-2010; Rankings from AP Poll

The 2009–10 Big Ten Conference women's basketball season marked the continuation of the annual tradition of competitive basketball among Big Ten Conference members.

== Offseason ==
- On July 30, the Women's Basketball Coaches Association (WBCA), on behalf of the Wade Coalition, announced the 2009-2010 preseason "Wade Watch" list for The State Farm Wade Trophy Division I Player of the Year. The nominees are made up of top NCAA Division I student-athletes who best embody the spirit of Lily Margaret Wade. This is based on the following criteria: game and season statistics, leadership, character, effect on their team and overall playing ability. The list of Big Ten athletes are as follows:
- Jantel Lavender, Ohio State
- Samantha Prahalis, Ohio State
- Jenna Smith, Illinois

== Preseason ==
- October 29: Ohio State junior Jantel Lavender was selected as the Big Ten Preseason Player of the Year by the conference coaches and a panel of media members.

=== Preseason polls ===
- Coaches Polls
  - 1. Ohio State
  - 2. Michigan State
  - 3. Minnesota
  - 4. Purdue
  - 5. Iowa
  - 6. Illinois
  - 7. Penn State
  - 8. Northwestern
  - 9. Indiana
  - 10. Wisconsin
  - 11. Michigan

=== Preseason All-Big Ten Coaches Team ===
- JENNA SMITH, Sr., F, ILL
- Allyssa DeHaan, Sr., C, MSU
- JANTEL LAVENDER, Jr., C, OSU
- Samantha Prahalis, So., G, OSU
- Tyra Grant, Sr., F, PSU

=== Preseason All-Big Ten Media Team ===
- Jenna Smith, Sr., F, ILL
- Allyssa DeHaan, Sr., C, MSU
- JANTEL LAVENDER, Jr., C, OSU
- Samantha Prahalis, So., G, OSU
- Tyra Grant, Sr., F, PSU

== Regular season ==
=== November ===
- Nov. 11: The Big Ten and Big 12 Conferences announced the formation of an annual inter-conference challenge for women's basketball. The challenge will span at least two years and will begin in the fall of 2010. The series will feature a home-and-home format over the initial two-year agreement, and each of the Big 12's teams will play in each Challenge, while one Big Ten team, Wisconsin, will play two Challenge games each year.

=== 2009 Big Ten/ACC Challenge Schedule ===
Date	Visiting Team	Home Team	Score	Leading Scorer	Attendance
Dec. 2/09	Georgia Tech	Penn State	G Tech 64-60	Tyra Grant, PSU (20)	TBD
Dec. 2/09	Illinois	Wake Forest	Illinois, 65-50	Jenna Smith, Illinois (27)	TBD
Dec. 2/09	Boston College	Iowa	BC, 72-67	Kamilee Wahlin, Iowa (23)	TBD
Dec. 3/09	Michigan	Virginia Tech	Mich, 71-51	Veronica Hicks, Michigan (19)	TBD
Dec. 3/09	Clemson	Northwestern	CLEM, 69-68	Kirstyn Wright, Clemson (22)	TBD
Dec. 3/09	Minnesota	Maryland	MD, 66-45	Kim Rodgers, Maryland (14)	TBD
Dec. 3/09	North Carolina	Michigan State	MSU, 72-66	Italee Lucas, North Carolina (29)	TBD
Dec. 3/09	Ohio State	Duke	Duke, 83-67	Jasmine Thomas, Duke (29)	TBD
Dec. 3/09	Purdue	Virginia	VA, 56-49	Brittany Rayburn, Purdue (19)	TBD
Dec. 3/09	Florida State	Indiana	FSU, 82-74	Jori Davis, Indiana (23)	TBD
Dec. 3/09	Wisconsin	NC State	Wisc, 53-48	Taylor Wurtz, Wisconsin (13)	TBD

=== Rankings ===
The rankings are based on the ESPN/USA Today poll.

AP Poll	Pre	Wk 1	Wk 2	Wk 3	Wk 4	Wk 5	Wk 6	Wk 7	Wk 8	Wk 9	Wk 10	Wk 11	Wk 12	Wk 13	Wk 14	Wk 15	Wk 16	Wk 17	Wk 18	Final^
Illinois	NR																			
Indiana	NR																			
Iowa																				
Michigan																				
Michigan State	10	25	22		20															
Minnesota																				
Northwestern																				
Ohio State	3	3	3		7															
Purdue	23																			
Wisconsin																				

^Final Poll = ESPN/USA Today Coaches Poll

=== In season honors ===
Players of the week

Throughout the conference regular season, the Big Ten offices named a player of the week each Monday.

Week	Player of the week
11/16/09	
11/23/09	
11/30/09	
12/7/09	
12/14/09	
12/21/09	
12/28/08	
1/4/10	
1/11/10	
1/18/10	
1/25/10	
2/1/10	
2/8/10	
2/15/10	
2/22/10	
3/1/10	
3/8/10	

Midseason watch lists

=== Conference honors ===
Honor	Coaches	Media
Player of the Year		
Coach of the Year		
Freshman of the Year		
Defensive Player of the Year		
Sixth Woman of the Year		
All Big Ten First Team		
All Big Ten Second Team		
All Big Ten Third Team		
—		
—		
—		
All-Freshman Team		
All Defensive Team		

== Statistical leaders ==
Scoring
Name	School	PPG

Rebounding
Name	School	RPG

Assists
Name	School	APG

Steals
Name	School	SPG

== Postseason ==
=== NCAA Tournament ===
# of Bids	Record	Win %	R32	S16	E8	F4	CG
	0–0						

=== National Invitation Tournament ===
# of Bids	Record	Win %	R2	R3	SF	CG
	0–0					

== See also ==
- 2009–10 NCAA Division I women's basketball season
