= 2009–10 Ohio State Buckeyes women's basketball team =

Intercollegiate basketball season

2009–10 Ohio State Buckeyes women's basketball

Preseason WNIT champions Buckeye Classic champions Big Ten regular season and tournament champions

NCAA tournament, second round
- Conference: Big Ten
- Record: 31–5 (15–3 Big 10)
- Head coach: Jim Foster

2009–10 Big Ten women's basketball standings
	Conf.				Overall
Team	W		L	PCT	W		L	PCT
No. 8 Ohio State†	15	–	3	.833	31	–	5	.861
No. 24 Michigan State	12	–	6	.667	23	–	10	.697
Wisconsin	10	–	8	.556	21	–	11	.656
Iowa	10	–	8	.556	20	–	14	.588
Purdue	9	–	9	.500	15	–	17	.469
Michigan	8	–	10	.444	20	–	13	.606
Penn State	8	–	10	.444	17	–	14	.548
Illinois	7	–	11	.389	19	–	14	.576
Northwestern	7	–	11	.389	18	–	15	.545
Indiana	7	–	11	.389	14	–	16	.467
Minnesota	6	–	12	.333	13	–	17	.433
† 2010 Big Ten tournament winner As of 3-27-2010; Rankings from AP Poll

The 2009–10 Ohio State Buckeyes women's basketball team represented Ohio State University in the 2009–10 NCAA Division I women's basketball season. The Buckeyes, coached by Jim Foster, successfully defended their Big Ten Conference regular-season and tournament championships. They advanced to the NCAA tournament, losing in the second round to Mississippi State.

== Offseason ==
- May 5: The Atlantic Coast Conference and the Big Ten Conference announced the pairings for the annual Big Ten/ACC Challenge for women’s basketball. The Buckeyes would travel to Durham, N.C., to take on the Duke Blue Devils Thursday, December 3.
- May 18: Following three days of team trials, USA Basketball announced the 14 finalists for the 2009 USA Women's U19 World Championship Team. The finalists would return to Colorado Springs on July 9 to begin training for the 2009 FIBA U19 World Championship. Buckeye Samantha Prahalis was one of the finalists.
- May 18: USA Basketball also announced 14 finalists for the 2009 USA Women's World University Games Team. The finalists included Buckeyes player Jantel Lavender.
- July 29: The 2009 USA U19 World Championship Team (5-1) defeated Japan (2-4) 109-68 in FIBA U19 World Championship second round action on Wednesday afternoon in Bangkok, Thailand. Ohio State's Samantha Prahalis hit a pair of threes and contributed 12 points.
- July 30: The Women's Basketball Coaches Association (WBCA), on behalf of the Wade Coalition, announced the 2009–2010 preseason "Wade Watch" list for The State Farm Wade Trophy Division I Player of the Year. Making the list from Ohio State were junior Jantel Lavender and sophomore Samantha Prahalis. They were among the 25 named to the list, which was made up of top NCAA Division I student-athletes who best embodied the spirit of Lily Margaret Wade. This was based on the following criteria: game and season statistics, leadership, character, effect on their team and overall playing ability.
- August 21: The 2009–10 preseason candidates list for the Women's Wooden Award was released, naming 31 student athletes. Jantel Lavender and Samantha Prahalis from Ohio State were two of the candidates.

=== Signees ===
- May 20: Ohio State announced the signing of Aleksandra Dobranic, a 6-foot, 4-inch forward/center from Novi Sad, Serbia, to a National Letter of Intent to play for the Buckeyes beginning next season. Dobranic was a member of the Serbian Junior National Team. Dobranic was the fourth member of the Buckeyes' 2009–10 recruiting class. She joined Emilee Harmon, a 6-2 forward and 2009 Associated Press Ohio Co-Player of the Year from Pickerington Central High School. The other recruits included Brianna Sanders, a 5-foot, 11-inch guard from Princeton High School in Cincinnati; and Tayler Hill, a McDonald's All-American and the two-time Gatorade Player of the Year from Minneapolis South.

== Preseason ==
- October 29: Ohio State junior Jantel Lavender was selected as the Big Ten Preseason Player of the Year by the conference coaches and a panel of media members.

=== Preseason WNIT ===
Date	Opponent	Location	Time	Score
Fri, Nov 13	Eastern Illinois	Columbus, Ohio	5:00 p.m	91–68
Sun, Nov 15	Bowling Green	Columbus, Ohio	2:00 p.m.	91–72
Tue, Nov 17	Alabama-Birmingham	Columbus, Ohio	7:00 p.m.	88–55
Wed, Nov 19	West Virginia	Columbus, Ohio	7:00 p.m.	92–69
Sun, Nov 22	Oklahoma State	Columbus, Ohio	2:00 p.m.	93–72

== Regular season ==
The Buckeyes hosted the Buckeye Classic from November 28–29.

Date	Opponent	Location	Time	Score
Wed, Nov 25	UNC Greensboro	Columbus, Ohio	7:00 p.m	89–56
Sat, Nov 28	IUPUI	Columbus, Ohio	2:00 p.m	88–33
Sun, Nov 29	California	Columbus, Ohio	2:00 p.m	83–71

=== Roster ===
Number	Name	Height	Position	Class

=== Schedule ===
Date	Opponent	Location	Time	Score
Fri, Nov 13	Eastern Illinois	Columbus, Ohio	TBA	91–68
Sun, Nov 15	Bowling Green	Columbus, Ohio	TBA	91–72
Tue, Nov 17	UAB	Columbus, Ohio	TBA	88–55
Thu, Nov 19	West Virginia	Columbus, Ohio	TBA	92–69
Sun, Nov 22	Oklahoma State	Columbus, Ohio	TBA	93–72
Wed, Nov 25	UNC Greensboro	Columbus, Ohio	7:00 p.m	89–56
Sat, Nov 28	IUPUI	Columbus, Ohio	2:00 p.m	88–33
Sun, Nov 29	California/Southern	Columbus, Ohio	2:00 p.m	83–71
Thu, Dec 03	Duke	at Durham, N.C.	TBA	67–83
Sun, Dec 06	Wisconsin *	Columbus, Ohio	2:00 p.m.	70–55
Sun, Dec 13	Ole Miss	at Oxford, Miss.	TBA	79–77
Tue, Dec 15	Wright State	Columbus, Ohio	TBA	84–47
Sat, Dec 19	Alabama A&M	Columbus, Ohio	TBA	78–54
Mon, Dec 21	Western Illinois	Columbus, Ohio	TBA	99–38
Mon, Dec 28	Illinois *	at Champaign, Ill.	TBA	76–47
Thu, Dec 31	Northwestern *	at Evanston, Ill.	TBA	86–60
Sun, Jan 03	Michigan *	Columbus, Ohio	TBA	59–56
Sat, Jan 09	Michigan State *	at East Lansing, Mich.	2:00 p.m.	65–62
Thu, Jan 14	Illinois *	Columbus, Ohio	TBA	72–61
Sun, Jan 17	Indiana *	Columbus, Ohio	2:00 p.m.	81–64
Thu, Jan 21	Michigan *	at Ann Arbor, Mich.	TBA	58–56
Mon, Jan 25	Purdue *	at West Lafayette, Ind.	7:00 p.m.	61–63
Thu, Jan 28	Minnesota *	Columbus, Ohio	7:30 p.m.	81–58
Sun, Jan 31	Indiana *	at Bloomington, Ind.	12:00 p.m.	62–67
Thu, Feb 04	Iowa *	Columbus, Ohio	7:30 p.m.	86–82
Sun, Feb 07	Penn State *	at State College, Pa.	TBA	86–73
Thu, Feb 11	Purdue *	Columbus, Ohio	7:30 p.m.	75–45
Sun, Feb 14	Minnesota *	at Minneapolis, Minn.	2:30 p.m.	64–59
Thu, Feb 18	Wisconsin *	at Madison, Wis.	TBA	83–78
Sun, Feb 21	Michigan State *	Columbus, Ohio	3:00 p.m.	68–71 OT
Thu, Feb 25	Northwestern *	Columbus, Ohio	TBA	78–47

== Player stats ==
Player	Games played	Minutes	Field goals	Three pointers	Free throws	Rebounds	Assists	Blocks	Steals	Points

== Postseason ==
- March 7: At the 3:51 mark of the second half, Janel Lavender reached the 2,000 point plateau. This was her 100th career game. She became the first female Buckeye to reach the mark as a junior. The other Buckeyes with 2,000 career points are Katie Smith (2,578) and Jessica Davenport (2,303). In addition, she was only the 15th Big Ten player to reach the 2,000 point plateau.

=== Big Ten Tournament ===
Date	Opponent	Location	Time	Score
Fri, Mar 05	Illinois *	at Indianapolis, Ind.	TBA	66–55
Sat, Mar 06	Wisconsin *	at Indianapolis, Ind.	TBA	82–73
Sun, Mar 07	Iowa *	at Indianapolis, Ind.	TBA	66–64

== Awards and honors ==
- Jantel Lavender: Big Ten Preseason Player of the Year by the conference coaches and a panel of media members

=== Preseason All-Big Ten Coaches Team ===
- JANTEL LAVENDER, Jr., C, OSU
- Samantha Prahalis, So., G, OSU

=== Preseason All-Big Ten Media Team ===
- JANTEL LAVENDER, Jr., C, OSU
- Samantha Prahalis, So., G, OSU

=== Postseason ===
- Jantel Lavender, Big Ten Tournament Most Outstanding Player

== Team players drafted into the WNBA ==
Round	Pick	Player	WNBA club

== See also ==
- 2009–10 Big Ten women's basketball season
- 2009–10 Ohio State Buckeyes women's ice hockey season
