= 2009–10 Iona Gaels women's basketball team =

American college basketball season

2009–10 Iona Gaels women's basketball

WNIT, first round
- Conference: Metro Atlantic Athletic Conference
- Record: 19–14 (13–5 MAAC)
- Head coach: Anthony Bozzella (8th season)
- Assistant coaches: Christi Abbate; Ashlee Kelly; Toni Horvath
- Home arena: Hynes Athletic Center

2009–10 MAAC women's basketball standings
	Conf.				Overall
Team	W		L	PCT	W		L	PCT
Marist †	15	–	3	.833	26	–	8	.765
Iona	13	–	5	.722	18	–	14	.563
Fairfield	11	–	7	.611	20	–	14	.588
Manhattan	10	–	8	.556	15	–	15	.500
Loyola (MD)	9	–	9	.500	14	–	16	.467
Niagara	9	–	9	.500	13	–	18	.419
Siena	8	–	10	.444	11	–	18	.379
Saint Peter's	7	–	11	.389	11	–	19	.367
Canisius	6	–	12	.333	12	–	19	.387
Rider	2	–	16	.111	4	–	26	.133
† 2010 MAAC tournament winner Rankings from AP Poll

The 2009–10 Iona Gaels women's basketball team represented the Iona College in the 2009–10 NCAA Division I women's basketball season. The Iona Gaels were coached by eight year head coach, Anthony Bozzella. They play their home games in New Rochelle, New York, at the Hynes Athletic Center, and are a member of the Metro Atlantic Athletic Conference playing towards the NCAA championship. Jessica Anger was the Director of Basketball Operations.

== Offseason ==
- August 12: Sophomore guard Jessica Scannell was named a member of the Irish Senior Women's basketball team for the European qualification series. Former Gael Michelle Fahy joined Scannell on the Irish squad.

== Exhibition ==
Date	Opponent	Location	Time	Score
Sat, Nov 07	DOWLING	New Rochelle, NY	1:00 pm	97-63

== Regular season ==
=== Roster ===
Number	Name	Class	Position	Height
0	Tomica Bacic	So.	G	6-0
1	Milica Paligoric	So.	C	6-3
2	Jessica Scannell	So.	G	5-8
5	Haley D'Angelo	Fr.	G	5-6
0	Suzi Fregosi	Jr.	G	5-6
15	Thazina Cook	Sr.	G	5-9
20	Diana Hubbard	Fr.	G	5-7
23	Kristina Ford	So.	F	6-1
24	Robin Felder	So.	G	5-5
25	Kara Kochanek	So.	F	6-2
31	Marissa Flagg	Jr.	G	5-5
33	Kiera Schiavetta	Jr.	G	5-6
34	Sarah Schoof	So.	C	6-3
35	Samantha Kopp	Fr.	F	6-2
44	Catherine Lutz	Jr.	G/F	6-1
45	Anda Ivkovic	Jr.	F	6-1
50	Anna McLean	Sr.	C	6-2

=== Schedule ===
The Gaels competed in the Iona Tip-Off Tournament (Arizona, Bucknell, Miami (OH)) from November 14–15. In addition, they competed in the Cancun Tournament November 26–27.

Date	Opponent	Location	Time	Score	Record
Sat, Nov 14	Arizona	New Rochelle, NY	7:30 pm	70-75 OT	0-1
Sun, Nov 15	Bucknell	New Rochelle, NY	3:30 pm	62-55	1-1
Fri, Nov 20	Pacific	New Rochelle, NY	12:00 pm	76-54	2-1
Sun, Nov 22	Notre Dame	at South Bend, IN	2:00 pm	45-80	2-2
Thu, Nov 26	Arkansas	at Cancun, Mexico	1:00 pm	60-66	2-3
Fri, Nov 27	Cleveland State	at Cancun, Mexico	2:30 pm	58-64	2-4
Mon, Dec 07	Maryland-Eastern Shore	at Princess Anne, MD	6:00 pm	53-50	3-4
Wed, Dec 09	Fordham	at Bronx, NY	7:00 pm	64-70	3-5
Fri, Dec 18	Georgia State	New Rochelle, NY	7:30 pm	56-64	3-6
Sun, Dec 20	Connecticut	at Storrs, CT	6:00 pm	35-90	3-7
Mon, Dec 28	St. Francis (NY)	New Rochelle, NY	7:30 pm	85-51	4-7
Sun, Jan 3	Loyola (MD)	New Rochelle, NY	2:00 pm	59-71	4-8 (0-1)
Tue, Jan 5	Manhattan	at Bronx, NY	7:00 pm	79-62	5-8 (1-1)
Sat, Jan 9	Canisius	at Buffalo, NY	2:00 pm	60-48	6-8 (2-1)
Mon, Jan 11	Niagara	at Lewiston, NY	7:00 pm	59-51	7-8 (3-1)
Sat, Jan 16	Siena	New Rochelle, NY	1:00 pm	69-55	8-8 (4-1)
Mon, Jan 18	Saint Peter's	New Rochelle, NY	5:00 pm	61-45	9-8 (5-1)
Fri, Jan 22	Manhattan	New Rochelle, NY	12:00 pm	64-53	10-8 (6-1)
Sun, Jan 24	Niagara	New Rochelle, NY	1:00 pm	71-55	11-8 (7-1)
Fri, Jan 29	Rider	at Lawrenceville, NJ	7:00 pm	85-60	12-8 (8-1)
Mon, Feb 1	Fairfield	New Rochelle, NY	5:00 pm	75-63	13-8 (9-1)
Fri, Feb 5	Marist	at Poughkeepsie, NY	7:30 pm	58-68	13-9 (9-2)
Sun, Feb 7	Siena	at Loudonville, NY	1:00 pm	67-75	13-10 (9-3)
Mon, Feb 15	Canisius	New Rochelle, NY	2:00 pm	63-47	14-11 (10-3)
Wed, Feb 17	Loyola (MD)	at Baltimore, MD	4:30 pm	72-70	15-11 (11-3)
Fri, Feb 19	Fairfield	at Fairfield, CT	7:00 pm	59-72	15-12 (11-4)
Sun, Feb 21	Saint Peter's	at Jersey City, NJ	2:00 pm	57-41	16-12 (12-4)
Fri, Feb 26	Marist	New Rochelle, NY	7:30 pm	80-82	16-13 (12-5)
Sun, Feb 28	Rider	New Rochelle, NY	2:00 pm	79-43	17-13 (13-5)

== Postseason ==
=== Metro Atlantic Athletic Conference tournament ===
Date	Opponent	Location	Time	Score	Record
Fri, Mar 5	(7) Siena (Quarterfinals)	at Albany, NY	9:30 am	59-43	18-13
Sat, Mar 6	(3) Fairfield (Semifinals)	at Albany, NY	9:30 am	57-61	18-14

=== WNIT ===
Date	Opponent	Location	Time	Score	Record
Fri, Mar 19	Maryland (First Round)	at College Park, MD	7:00 pm	53-88	18-15
