= 2009–10 Ohio Bobcats women's basketball team =

Intercollegiate basketball season

2009–10 Ohio Bobcats women's basketball
- Conference: Mid-American Conference
- East Division
- Record: 8–22 (4–12 MAC)
- Head coach: Semeka Randall (2rd season)
- Assistant coach: Skyler Young
- Home arena: Convocation Center

2009–10 Mid-American Conference women's basketball standings
| | Conf. | | | | Overall |
| Team | W | | L | PCT | W | | L | PCT |
|---|---|---|---|---|---|---|---|---|
| Bowling Green † | 14 | – | 2 | .875 | 27 | – | 6 | .818 |
| Kent State | 12 | – | 4 | .750 | 20 | – | 10 | .667 |
| Akron | 11 | – | 5 | .688 | 18 | – | 13 | .581 |
| Miami (OH) | 6 | – | 10 | .375 | 9 | – | 22 | .290 |
| Ohio | 4 | – | 12 | .250 | 8 | – | 22 | .267 |
| Buffalo | 3 | – | 13 | .188 | 7 | – | 23 | .233 |
West
| Toledo | 12 | – | 4 | .750 | 24 | – | 8 | .750 |
| Eastern Michigan | 11 | – | 5 | .688 | 22 | – | 8 | .733 |
| Central Michigan | 8 | – | 8 | .500 | 12 | – | 18 | .400 |
| Ball State | 7 | – | 9 | .438 | 14 | – | 17 | .452 |
| Northern Illinois | 4 | – | 12 | .250 | 10 | – | 19 | .345 |
| Western Michigan | 4 | – | 12 | .250 | 9 | – | 21 | .300 |
† 2010 MAC tournament winner Rankings from AP poll

The 2009–10 Ohio Bobcats women's basketball team represented Ohio University during the 2009–10 NCAA Division I women's basketball season. The Bobcats, led by second year head coach Semeka Randall, played their home games at the Convocation Center in Athens, Ohio as a member of the Mid-American Conference. They finished the season 8–22 and 4–12 in MAC play.

== Preseason ==
The preseason poll was announced by the league office on October 28, 2009. Ohio was picked fifth in the MAC East.

=== Preseason women's basketball poll ===
(First place votes in parenthesas)

==== East Division ====
1. Bowling Green (22)
2. Kent State (12)
3. Miami (2)
4. Akron
5. Ohio
6. Buffalo

==== West Division ====
1. Toledo (18)
2. Ball State (14)
3. Northern Illinois (4)
4. Central Michigan
5. Eastern Michigan
6. Western Michigan

==== Tournament champs ====
Bowling Green

=== Preseason All-MAC ===
Preseason All-MAC teams
| Team | Player | Position | Year |
|---|---|---|---|
| Preseason All-MAC East | Jennifer Bushby | G | Sr. |

== Schedule ==
| Date time, TV | Rank^{#} | Opponent^{#} | Result | Record | Site (attendance) city, state |
Non-conference regular season
| Nov 13, 2009* | | at Cleveland State | L 34–56 | 0–1 | |
| Nov 16, 2009* | | Navy | L 51–55 | 0–2 | |
| Nov 22, 2009* | | George Washington | W 70–58 | 1–2 | |
| Nov 24, 2009* | | Marshall | W 63–48 | 2–2 | |
| Dec 1, 2009* | | at Southern Utah | L 53–56 | 2–3 | |
| Dec 3, 2009* | | at Utah Valley | W 57–43 | 3–3 | |
| Dec 6, 2009* | | Syracuse | L 54–70 | 3–4 | |
| Dec 10, 2009* | | at Temple | L 43–65 | 3–5 | |
| Dec 13, 2009* | | at Duquesne | L 50–52 | 3–6 | |
| Dec 17, 2009* | | UNC Wilmington | L 51–58 | 3–7 | |
| Dec 19, 2009* | | Clemson | L 81–89 ^{OT} | 3–8 | |
| Dec 28, 2009* | | at Florida | L 49–78 | 3–9 | |
| Jan 2, 2010* | | Colgate | W 75–40 | 4–9 | |
MAC regular season
| Jan 6, 2010 | | at Kent State | L 66–70 | 4–10 (0–1) | |
| Jan 9, 2010 | | Bowling Green | L 42–77 | 4–11 (0–2) | |
| Jan 13, 2010 | | at Miami (OH) | L 58–66 | 4–12 (0–3) | |
| Jan 16, 2010 | | at Buffalo | L 62–76 | 4–13 (0–4) | |
| Jan 20, 2010 | | Akron | W 64–63 | 5–13 (1–4) | |
| Jan 23, 2010 | | at Central Michigan | L 56–59 | 5–14 (1–5) | |
| Jan 27, 2010 | | Eastern Michigan | L 53–56 | 5–15 (1–6) | |
| Jan 30, 2010 | | Ball State | W 62–59 | 6–15 (2–6) | |
| Feb 3, 2010 | | at Western Michigan | L 47–51 | 6–16 (2–7) | |
| Feb 6, 2010 | | Toledo | L 54–76 | 6–17 (2–8) | |
| Feb 10, 2010 | | at Northern Illinois | L 61–68 | 6–18 (2–9) | |
| Feb 13, 2010 | | at Bowling Green | L 57–73 | 6–19 (2–10) | |
| Feb 20, 2010 | | Kent State | L 74–80 | 6–20 (2–11) | |
| Feb 23, 2010 | | Miami (OH) | W 69–56 | 7–20 (3–11) | |
| Feb 27, 2010 | | Buffalo | W 61–58 | 8–20 (4–11) | |
| Mar 2, 2010 | | at Akron | L 41–69 | 8–21 (4–12) | |
MAC Tournament
| Mar 7, 2010 | | at Central Michigan | L 66–69 | 8–22 | |
*Non-conference game. ^{#}Rankings from AP Poll. (#) Tournament seedings in parentheses. All times are in Eastern Time.

== Awards and honors ==
=== All-MAC Awards ===
Postseason All-MAC teams
| Team | Player | Position | Year |
|---|---|---|---|
| All-MAC Honorable Mention | Jennifer Bushby | G | Sr. |
