= 2009–10 Illinois Fighting Illini women's basketball team =

Intercollegiate basketball season

2009–10 Illinois Fighting Illini women's basketball

Cal Poly Holiday Beach Classic champions
- Conference: Big Ten
- Record: 7-1 (0-0 Big 10)
- Head coach: Jolette Law
- Assistant coaches: Tamika Louis; Patrick Klein
- Home arena: Assembly Hall

2009–10 Big Ten women's basketball standings
	Conf.				Overall
Team	W		L	PCT	W		L	PCT
No. 8 Ohio State†	15	–	3	.833	31	–	5	.861
No. 24 Michigan State	12	–	6	.667	23	–	10	.697
Wisconsin	10	–	8	.556	21	–	11	.656
Iowa	10	–	8	.556	20	–	14	.588
Purdue	9	–	9	.500	15	–	17	.469
Michigan	8	–	10	.444	20	–	13	.606
Penn State	8	–	10	.444	17	–	14	.548
Illinois	7	–	11	.389	19	–	14	.576
Northwestern	7	–	11	.389	18	–	15	.545
Indiana	7	–	11	.389	14	–	16	.467
Minnesota	6	–	12	.333	13	–	17	.433
† 2010 Big Ten tournament winner As of 3-27-2010; Rankings from AP Poll

The 2009–10 Illinois Fighting Illini women's basketball team represented the University of Illinois in the 2009–10 NCAA Division I women's basketball season. It was the 36th year of Illinois women's basketball. The Fighting Illini were a member of the Big 10.

== Offseason ==
- June 29: The University of Illinois Division of Intercollegiate Athletics marketing and promotions department recently placed first in the Single-Day Attendance Promotion. This was awarded by the National Association of Collegiate Marketing Administrators (NACMA) for the 2008-09 season. The award was for the World's Biggest Basketball Practice promotion, held at Memorial Stadium on Oct. 11, 2008 following the Fighting Illini's sold-out football game against Minnesota.

At the event, the Illinois men's and women's basketball teams held their first practice of the season immediately following the football game on a specially constructed outdoor court in the stadium's South end zone. Over 60,000 fans witnessed the practice, which also helped raise more than $20,000 for Coaches vs. Cancer. The World's Biggest Basketball Practice marked the largest crowd ever for a men's basketball practice and is the highest attendance to witness any women's basketball event. This honor marks the third year in a row that the Illinois marketing department has been awarded gold by NACMA for a Single-Day Attendance promotion.

- July 2: Lisa Cermignano was hired as an assistant coach. Cermignano has 11 years of Division I coaching experience, including the last three as an assistant at Vanderbilt University. She fills the vacancy on Law's staff left by Karen Middleton, who recently became the head coach at Western Carolina University. Cermignano served as the team's defensive coordinator, and was part of Vanderbilt's recruiting efforts. In three seasons at VU, she helped lead the Commodores to three NCAA Tournament appearances, including two Sweet 16s (2008 and '09), and two Southeastern Conference (SEC) tournament titles (2007 and '09).
- July 29: University of Illinois incoming freshman Destiny Williams has helped lead Team USA to a berth in the quarterfinals at the 2009 FIBA Women's U19 World Championships in Bangkok.
- July 30: The Women's Basketball Coaches Association (WBCA), on behalf of the Wade Coalition, announced the 2009-2010 preseason "Wade Watch" list for The State Farm Wade Trophy Division I Player of the Year. University of Illinois senior Jenna Smith is one of 25 named to the list, which is made up of top NCAA Division I student-athletes who best embody the spirit of Lily Margaret Wade. This is based on the following criteria: game and season statistics, leadership, character, effect on their team and overall playing ability.
- August 21: The 2009-10 preseason candidates list for the Women’s Wooden Award was released, naming 31 student athletes. Jenna Smith from Illinois was one of the candidates.

== Exhibition ==
Date	Opponent	Location	Time	Score
11/08/09	vs. Lewis (Exhibition)	Assembly Hall	TBA	75-40

== Regular season ==
- The Fighting Illini will compete in the Cal Poly Holiday Beach Classic on November 28 and 29.

=== Roster ===
Jenna Smith was an all Big 10 selection the previous two seasons. Destiny Williams transferred to Baylor on January 20. The six incoming freshmen are ranked as the No. 3 recruiting class by ESPN HoopGurlz. Destiny Williams is a McDonald’s All-American.

Number	Name	Height	Position	Class
00	Karisma Penn	6-2	Forward	Freshman
1	Whitney Toone	5-10	Forward	Senior
3	Fabiola Josil	5-7	Guard	Sophomore
11	Eboni Mitchell	5-7	Guard	Sophomore
12	Lydia McCully	5-9	Guard	Sophomore
13	Jenna Smith	6-3	Center	Senior
21	Macie Blinn	5-11	Guard	Sophomore
22	Lacey Simpson	6-1	Forward	Senior
24	Adrienne Godbold	5-11	Guard	Freshman
34	Lana Rukavina	6-3	Forward	Sophomore
42	Amber Moore	5-11	Guard	Freshman
44	Kersten Magrum	6-1	Forward	Freshman
50	Brianna Jones	6-2	Forward	Freshman

=== Schedule ===
Date	Opponent	Location	Time	Score
11/13/09	at Temple	Philadelphia, Pa.	7:00 p.m. ET	L 82-78 (OT)
11/15/09	vs. Siena	Assembly Hall	TBA	W 85-53
11/18/09	vs. Central Michigan	Assembly Hall	TBA	W 77-59
11/22/09	vs. Bradley	Assembly Hall	TBA	W 67-45
11/24/09	at Illinois State	Normal, Ill.	7:00 p.m. CT	W 62-51
11/28/09	at Cal Poly	San Luis Obispo, Calif.	2:00 p.m. PT	W 56-47
11/29/09	vs. Alabama	San Luis Obispo, Calif.	2:00 p.m. PT	W 64-55
12/02/09	at Wake Forest	Winston-Salem, N.C.	TBA	W 65-50
12/09/09	vs. Marquette	Assembly Hall	TBA-Big Ten Network	
12/19/09	vs. Oakland	Assembly Hall	TBA	
12/28/09	vs. Ohio State *	Assembly Hall	TBA	
12/31/09	vs. Penn State *	Assembly Hall	TBA	
01/03/10	vs. Wisconsin *	Assembly Hall	TBA	
01/07/10	at Indiana *	Bloomington, Ind.	TBA	
01/10/10	vs. Minnesota *	Assembly Hall	3:30 p.m. CT-BTN	
01/14/10	at Ohio State *	Columbus, Ohio	TBA	
01/17/10	at Wisconsin *	Madison, Wis.	TBA	
01/21/10	vs. Iowa *	Assembly Hall	TBA	
01/24/10	at Penn State *	University Park, Pa.	TBA	
01/28/10	vs. Michigan *	Assembly Hall	TBA	
01/31/10	at Minnesota *	Minneapolis, Minn.	TBA	
02/04/10	at Purdue *	West Lafayette, Ind.	TBA	
02/07/10	vs. Indiana *	Assembly Hall	TBA	
02/11/10	vs. Northwestern *	Assembly Hall	TBA	
02/14/10	at Iowa *	Iowa City, Iowa	TBA	
02/18/10	at Michigan State *	East Lansing, Mich.	TBA	
02/21/10	vs. Purdue *	Assembly Hall	4:00 p.m. CT-BTN	
02/28/10	at Northwestern	Evanston, Ill.	TBA	

== Postseason ==
=== Big Ten tournament ===
Date	Opponent	Location	Time	Score
03/04/10	First Round	Indianapolis, Ind.	TBA	

== Awards and honors ==
=== Preseason All-Big Ten Coaches Team ===
- JENNA SMITH, Sr., F, ILL

=== Preseason All-Big Ten Media Team ===
- Jenna Smith, Sr., F, ILL

== See also ==
- 2009–10 Big Ten women's basketball season
- 2009–10 Illinois Fighting Illini men's basketball team
