= 2009–10 Northwestern Wildcats women's basketball team =

Intercollegiate basketball season

2009–10 Northwestern Wildcats women's basketball

WNIT, Third Round
- Conference: Big Ten
- Record: 18–15 (7–11 Big 10)
- Head coach: Joe McKeown (2nd season)
- Home arena: Welsh–Ryan Arena

2009–10 Big Ten women's basketball standings
	Conf.				Overall
Team	W		L	PCT	W		L	PCT
No. 8 Ohio State†	15	–	3	.833	31	–	5	.861
No. 24 Michigan State	12	–	6	.667	23	–	10	.697
Wisconsin	10	–	8	.556	21	–	11	.656
Iowa	10	–	8	.556	20	–	14	.588
Purdue	9	–	9	.500	15	–	17	.469
Michigan	8	–	10	.444	20	–	13	.606
Penn State	8	–	10	.444	17	–	14	.548
Illinois	7	–	11	.389	19	–	14	.576
Northwestern	7	–	11	.389	18	–	15	.545
Indiana	7	–	11	.389	14	–	16	.467
Minnesota	6	–	12	.333	13	–	17	.433
† 2010 Big Ten tournament winner As of 3-27-2010; Rankings from AP Poll

The 2009–10 Northwestern Wildcats women's basketball team represented the Northwestern University in the 2009–10 NCAA Division I women's basketball season. The Wildcats were coached by Joe McKeown. The Wildcats were a member of the Big Ten Conference.

== Offseason ==
- May 5: Northwestern will host Clemson in the third-annual Big Ten/ACC Challenge Women's Basketball Challenge. The contest pits the two teams in a re-match from Clemson's 78–75 overtime victory in South Carolina last season.
- May 11: Northwestern announced the signing of Inesha Hale to a National Letter of Intent. Hale is a 5–9 point guard from Raytown, MO and joins two early period signees, Inga Orekhova and Dannielle Diamant as part of next year's class. According to ESPN HoopGurlz, Northwestern's class was ranked as 27th nationally prior to Hale's signing. Hale was ranked No. 14 at the point guard position by Scouts, Inc., and was tabbed No. 87 nationally overall by ESPN's Hoopgurlz.
- May 13: Center Amy Jaeschke was selected to participate in the USA Basketball 2009 Women's World University Games National Trials. The tryouts will be held May 14–17 at the U.S. Olympic Training Center in Colorado Springs, Colo.
- July 1: Kendall Hackney (Cincinnati, Ohio/Mount Notre Dame) was added to the 2009–10 Wildcat freshmen class. Hackney is Ohio's Miss Basketball and joins fellow top-100 signees Inga Orekhova (No. 40), Inesha Hale (No. 87) and Dannielle Diamant.

== Exhibition ==
Date	Location	Opponent	Score	Record
Nov. 1	Evanston, IL.	Robert Morris	119–60	1–0

== Regular season ==
=== Schedule ===
Date	Location	Opponent	Score	Record
Nov. 13	Toledo, OH	Toledo	73–64	1–0
Nov. 20	Evanston, IL	SIUE	68–37	2–0
Nov. 22	Evanston, IL	IPFW	78–58	3–0
Nov. 24	Evanston, IL	DePaul	59–55	4–0
Nov. 27	Evanston, IL	College of Charleston	50–54	4–1
Nov. 28	Evanston, IL	Penn	61–39	5–1
Dec. 3	Evanston, IL	Clemson		
Dec. 6	Evanston, IL	Purdue		
Dec. 13	Manhattan, KS	Kansas State		
Dec. 17	Evanston, IL	Arkansas		
Dec. 19	Evanston, IL	Chicago State		
Dec. 22	Evanston, IL	Loyola		
