= 2009–10 Michigan Wolverines women's basketball team =

Intercollegiate basketball season

2009–10 Michigan Wolverines women's basketball
- Conference: Big Ten
- Record: 5–2 (0–0 Big 10)
- Head coach: Kevin Borseth
- Assistant coaches: Dawn Plitzuweit; Tianna Kirkland; Mike Williams

2009–10 Big Ten women's basketball standings
	Conf.				Overall
Team	W		L	PCT	W		L	PCT
No. 8 Ohio State†	15	–	3	.833	31	–	5	.861
No. 24 Michigan State	12	–	6	.667	23	–	10	.697
Wisconsin	10	–	8	.556	21	–	11	.656
Iowa	10	–	8	.556	20	–	14	.588
Purdue	9	–	9	.500	15	–	17	.469
Michigan	8	–	10	.444	20	–	13	.606
Penn State	8	–	10	.444	17	–	14	.548
Illinois	7	–	11	.389	19	–	14	.576
Northwestern	7	–	11	.389	18	–	15	.545
Indiana	7	–	11	.389	14	–	16	.467
Minnesota	6	–	12	.333	13	–	17	.433
† 2010 Big Ten tournament winner As of 3-27-2010; Rankings from AP Poll

The 2009–10 Michigan Wolverines women's basketball team represented the University of Michigan in the 2009–10 NCAA Division I women's basketball season. The Wolverines were a member of the Big 10.

Led by coach Kevin Borseth, the team finished the season as 6th in the Big Ten WBB with an overall record of 21 wins and 14 losses.

== Offseason ==
- May 11, 2009: The College Sports Information Directors of America (CoSIDA) announced its Academic All-America Hall of Fame 2009 induction class. One of the five inductees is former University of Michigan basketball player Diane Dietz. She played with the school from 1979 to 1982. She is the Wolverines all-time leading scorer and a three-time Academic All-American.
- June 19, 2009: The Athletic Department announced the hiring of Jon Sanderson as the head strength and conditioning coach for basketball. Sanderson comes to Michigan after spending the last three years (2006–09) at Clemson University as an assistant strength and conditioning coach.

== Regular season ==
=== Roster ===
Number	Name	Height	Position	Class
3	Veronica Hicks	5-9	Guard	Junior
4	Jamillya Hardley	5-8	Guard	Sophomore
5	Janell Smith	5-7	Guard	Sophomore
20	Courtney Boylan	5-8	Guard	Sophomore
23	Kalyn McPherson	5-7	Guard	Senior
25	Krista Phillips	6-6	Center	Senior
33	Carmen Reynolds	6-0	Forward	Sophomore
35	Lauren Young	6-2	Forward	Junior

=== Schedule ===
Date	Location	Opponent	Score	Leading Scorer	Record
Nov. 13	Ann Arbor, MI	Ball State	87-67		1-0
Nov. 16	Ann Arbor, MI	Marquette	67-50		2-0
Nov. 19	Ann Arbor, MI	Southern Mississippi	91-54		3-0
Nov. 22	Lawrence, KS	Kansas	66-77		3-1
Nov. 27	Las Cruces, NM	Stephen F. Austin	85-61		4-1
Nov. 28	Las Cruces, NM	New Mexico State	67-72		4-2
Dec. 3	Blacksburg, VA	Virginia Tech	71-51		5-2
Dec. 6	Iowa City, IA	Iowa			

== See also ==
- 2009–10 Big Ten women's basketball season
