= 2009–10 Purdue Boilermakers women's basketball team =

Intercollegiate basketball season

2009–10 Purdue Boilermakers women's basketball

WNIT, Second Round
- Conference: Big Ten Conference
- Record: 15–17 (9–9 Big Ten)
- Head coach: Sharon Versyp (4th season)
- Home arena: Mackey Arena

2009–10 Big Ten women's basketball standings
	Conf.				Overall
Team	W		L	PCT	W		L	PCT
No. 8 Ohio State†	15	–	3	.833	31	–	5	.861
No. 24 Michigan State	12	–	6	.667	23	–	10	.697
Wisconsin	10	–	8	.556	21	–	11	.656
Iowa	10	–	8	.556	20	–	14	.588
Purdue	9	–	9	.500	15	–	17	.469
Michigan	8	–	10	.444	20	–	13	.606
Penn State	8	–	10	.444	17	–	14	.548
Illinois	7	–	11	.389	19	–	14	.576
Northwestern	7	–	11	.389	18	–	15	.545
Indiana	7	–	11	.389	14	–	16	.467
Minnesota	6	–	12	.333	13	–	17	.433
† 2010 Big Ten tournament winner As of 3-27-2010; Rankings from AP Poll

The 2009–10 Purdue Boilermakers women's basketball team represented Purdue University in the 2009–10 NCAA Division I women's basketball season. The Boilermakers were coached by Sharon Versyp. The Boilermakers were a member of the Big Ten Conference.

== Offseason ==
- May 5: Drey Mingo, a sophomore forward at Maryland will transfer to Purdue. Mingo appeared in 33 of 35 games this past season for the 31–5 Terrapins, including all 14 regular-season Atlantic Coast Conference contests. She averaged 3.7 points and 2.1 rebounds.

- May 5: The Atlantic Coast Conference and the Big Ten Conference announced the pairings for the annual Big Ten/ACC Challenge for women's basketball. The Boilermakers will travel to Charlottesville, Virginia, to take on Virginia on Thursday, December 3. It is the first meeting in women's basketball between the two schools. The Cavaliers finished the 2008–09 season with a 24–10 record and were knocked out in the second round of the NCAA Tournament, 99–73 by California.
- Sept. 9: Sharon Versyp has been named the honorary chair for the 2009 Greater Lafayette Hunger Hike. The Hunger Hike is a community service project for the Purdue women's basketball team.

== Exhibition ==
Date	Location	Opponent	Score	Record
Nov. 8	West Lafayette, IN	Lindsey Wilson College	74–39	1–0

== Regular season ==
The Boilermakers will participate in the BTI Classic, to be held November 20–22 in West Lafayette.

=== Roster ===
Number	Name	Height	Position	Class	Hometown
00	Jodi Howell	5'11"	SG	RS-SR	Alexandria, Indiana
2	Antoinette Howard	5'11"	SG	JR	Loganville, Georgia
5	Brittany Rayburn	5'11"	SG	SO	Attica, Indiana
20	FahKara Malone	5'3"	PG	SR	Evansville, Indiana
22	KK Houser	5'6"	PG	FR	Lincoln, Nebraska
24	Drey Mingo	6'2"	SF	JR	Atlanta, Georgia
32	Sam Ostarello	6'2"	SF	FR	Fort Pierre, South Dakota
40	Chelsea Jones	6'4"	C	SO	Fort Smith, Arkansas
41	Alex Guyton	6'3"	PF	SO	Bloomington, Indiana
43	Chantel Poston	5'10"	SF	SO	Milan, Tennessee
52	Ashley Wilson	6'0"	PF	FR	Wheeling, Illinois
54	Sam Woods	6'3"	PF	RS-SO	Bolingbrook, Illinois
55	Laura Garriga	6'0"	C	SR	Cambrils, Spain

=== Schedule ===
Date	Opponent	Location	Time	Score	Record
11/15/09	vs. Western Illinois	West Lafayette, Ind.	1:00 p.m.	70–37	1–0
11/20/09	vs. Seattle University	West Lafayette, Ind.	5:00 p.m.	69–38	2–0
11/21/09	vs. Dayton	West Lafayette, Ind.	5:00 p.m.	53–56	2–1
11/22/09	vs. Georgetown	West Lafayette, Ind.	4:00 p.m.	55–39	3–1
11/27/09	at UC Riverside	Riverside, Calif.	10:00 p.m.	65–53	4–1
11/29/09	at Pepperdine	Malibu, Calif.	5:00 p.m.	59–64	4–2
12/03/09	at Virginia	Charlottesville, Va.	7:00 p.m.	49–56	4–3
12/06/09	at Northwestern	Evanston, Ill.	5:00 p.m.	58–60	4–4
12/13/09	at Oakland	Rochester, Mich.	1:30 p.m.	71–64	5–4
12/19/09	vs. Evansville	West Lafayette, Ind.	12:00 p.m.	73–42	6–4
12/21/09	vs. Gardner-Webb	West Lafayette, Ind.	7:00 p.m.	55–56	6–5
12/28/09	vs. Minnesota	West Lafayette, Ind.	6:30 p.m.	51–43	7–5
12/31/09	vs. Indiana	West Lafayette, Ind.	12:00 p.m.	76–66	8–5
01/04/10	vs. Notre Dame	West Lafayette, Ind.	7:00 p.m.	75–79	8–6
01/07/10	at Wisconsin	Madison, Wis.	7:30 p.m.	51–64	8–7
01/10/10	vs. Northwestern	West Lafayette, Ind.	2:00 p.m.	53–42	9–7
01/14/10	at Minnesota	Minneapolis, Minn.	7:30 p.m.	47–74	9–8
01/17/10	vs. Iowa	West Lafayette, Ind.	12:00 p.m.	81–59	10–8
01/21/10	at Michigan State	East Lansing, Mich.	7:30 p.m.	54–72	10–9
01/25/10	vs. Ohio State	West Lafayette, Ind.	7:00 p.m.	63–61	11–9
01/28/10	at Penn State	University Park, Pa.	7:00 p.m.	80–76 (OT)	12–9
01/31/10	at Iowa	Iowa City, Iowa	3:00 p.m.	50–70	12–10
02/04/10	vs. Illinois	West Lafayette, Ind.	7:00 p.m.	53–48	13–10
02/07/10	vs. Wisconsin	West Lafayette, Ind.	2:00 p.m.	58–56	14–10
02/11/10	at Ohio State	Columbus, Ohio	7:30 p.m.	45–75	14–11
02/14/10	vs. Penn State	West Lafayette, Ind.	2:00 p.m.	63–59	15–11
02/21/10	at Illinois	Champaign, Ill.	5:00 p.m.	57–61	15–12
02/25/10	vs. Michigan State	West Lafayette, Ind.	7:00 p.m.	64–79	15–13
02/28/10	at Michigan	Ann Arbor, Mich.	2:00 p.m.	63–64	15–14

== Postseason ==
=== Big Ten tournament ===
Date	Opponent	Location	Time	Score
03/05/10	vs. Wisconsin (First Round)	Indianapolis, Ind.	8:30 p.m.	51–73

=== WNIT tournament ===
Date	Opponent	Location	Time	Score
03/17/10	vs. Eastern Michigan (First Round)	Indianapolis, Ind.	7:00 p.m.	56–50
03/21/10	vs. Illinois State (Second Round)	Indianapolis, Ind.	12:00 p.m.	57–59
