= 2009–10 Indiana Hoosiers women's basketball team =

Intercollegiate basketball season

2009–10 Indiana Hoosiers women's basketball
- Conference: Big Ten Conference
- Record: 14–16 (7–11 Big Ten)
- Head coach: Felisha Legette-Jack
- Home arena: Assembly Hall

2009–10 Big Ten women's basketball standings
	Conf.				Overall
Team	W		L	PCT	W		L	PCT
No. 8 Ohio State†	15	–	3	.833	31	–	5	.861
No. 24 Michigan State	12	–	6	.667	23	–	10	.697
Wisconsin	10	–	8	.556	21	–	11	.656
Iowa	10	–	8	.556	20	–	14	.588
Purdue	9	–	9	.500	15	–	17	.469
Michigan	8	–	10	.444	20	–	13	.606
Penn State	8	–	10	.444	17	–	14	.548
Illinois	7	–	11	.389	19	–	14	.576
Northwestern	7	–	11	.389	18	–	15	.545
Indiana	7	–	11	.389	14	–	16	.467
Minnesota	6	–	12	.333	13	–	17	.433
† 2010 Big Ten tournament winner As of 3-27-2010; Rankings from AP Poll

The 2009–10 Indiana Hoosiers women's basketball team represented Indiana University in the 2009–10 NCAA Division I basketball season. The Hoosiers were coached by Felisha Legette-Jack. The Hoosiers were a member of the Big Ten Conference.

== Offseason ==
- Aug 13: Indiana head coach has announced the addition of Scott Dorrell as Video Coordinator. Dorrell joins the staff after spending 2 seasons as a manager.

- Aug 1: Indiana head coach has announced the addition of Evan Suttner as Graduate Assistant Suttner joins the staff after spending 3 seasons as head manager.

- May 1: Indiana head coach has announced the addition of Amaka Agugua to the Hoosier women's basketball coaching staff. She will begin her duties at Indiana on Monday, May 4. Agugua comes to IU after spending three seasons at Virginia Commonwealth.
- May 5: The Hoosiers will host Florida State on Thursday, Dec. 3, in the third annual Big Ten/ACC Women's Basketball Challenge in Assembly Hall in Bloomington. The Hoosiers are 1–1 in the history of the challenge. The challenge began during the 2007–08 season. In the inaugural challenge, Indiana hosted Florida State and lost, 85–78. Last season, the Hoosiers traveled to Coral Gables, Fla., and defeated Miami, 69–54.
- May 18: Amber Jackson scored 22 points and Whitney Thomas collected a double-double with 15 points and 14 rebounds as the Indiana women's basketball team defeated USD Santa Marinella, an Italian B professional league team, 87–39.
- May 20: Nine Hoosiers got in the scoring column as the Indiana women's basketball team defeated Firenze Basket in Florence, Italy, 88–41, in its second game on a 10-day tour of Italy. Firenze Basket is a member of the Italian A-2 professional league.
- May 21:The Hoosiers came back from a 12-point deficit early in the third quarter to defeat Sernavimar Marghera, 79–69, in its third game on a tour of Italy. The Hoosiers will play their final game in Italy on Sunday, May 24, when they face ASD Geas Basket in Lake Como.

== Exhibition ==
Date	Opponent	Location	Time	Score
11/01/09	vs. Lambuth	Bloomington, Ind.	2 pm	W 108–54
11/05/09	vs. Grand Valley State	Bloomington, Ind.	2 pm	W 80–70

== Regular season ==
The Hoosiers will participate in the Junkanoo Jam on November 26 and 27.

=== Schedule ===
Date	Opponent	Location	Time	Score
11/13/09	at Memphis	Memphis, Tenn	6 PM	W 78–74
11/15/09	vs. IUPUI	Bloomington, Ind.	2 PM	W 75–52
11/18/09	vs. Cincinnati	Bloomington, Ind.	7 PM	W 64–57
11/22/09	vs. Missouri	Bloomington, Ind.	TBA	L, 76–71
11/26/09	vs. Virginia	Freeport, Bahamas	TBA	L, 84–79
11/27/09	UNC-Charlotte	Freeport, Bahamas	TBA	W, 72–61
12/03/09	vs. Florida State	Bloomington, Ind.	TBA	
12/06/09	at Michigan State	East Lansing, Mich.	12:00 p.m. ET	
12/09/09	vs. Tennessee-Martin	Bloomington, Ind.	TBA	
12/13/09	at Saint Louis	St. Louis, Mo.	TBA	
12/19/09	at Cleveland State	Cleveland, Ohio	TBA	
12/22/09	vs. Toledo	Bloomington, Ind.	TBA	
12/31/09	at Purdue	West Lafayette, Ind.	TBA	
01/03/10	vs. Michigan State	Bloomington, Ind.	12:00 p.m. ET	
01/07/10	vs. Illinois	Bloomington, Ind.	7:00 p.m. ET	
01/10/10	at Penn State	State College, Pa.	12:00 p.m. ET	
01/14/10	vs. Michigan	Bloomington, Ind.	7:00 p.m. ET	
01/17/10	at Ohio State	Columbus, Ohio	2/4:30 p.m. ET	
01/21/10	vs. Northwestern	Bloomington, Ind.	7:00 p.m. ET	
01/24/10	at Michigan	Ann Arbor, Mich.	12:00 p.m. ET	
01/28/10	vs. Wisconsin	Bloomington, Ind.	7:00 p.m. ET	
01/31/10	vs. Ohio State	Bloomington, Ind.	12:00 p.m. ET	
02/07/10	at Illinois	Champaign, Ill.	TBA	
02/11/10	vs. Iowa	Bloomington, Ind.	7:00 p.m. ET	
02/14/10	at Wisconsin	Madison, Wis.	TBA	
02/18/10	at Northwestern	Evanston, Ill.	TBA	
02/21/10	vs. Minnesota	Bloomington, Ind.	12:00 p.m. ET	
02/25/10	at Iowa	Iowa City, Iowa	TBA	
02/28/10	vs. Penn State	Bloomington, Ind.	TBA	

== Postseason ==
=== Big Ten tournament ===
Date	Opponent	Location	Time	Score
03/04/10	Big Ten Tournament First Round	Indianapolis, Ind.	TBA	

== See also ==
- 2009–10 Big Ten women's basketball season
- 2009–10 Indiana Hoosiers men's basketball team
