= 2009–10 Michigan State Spartans women's basketball team =

Intercollegiate basketball season

2009–10 Michigan State Spartans women's basketball

Junkanoo Jam champions

NCAA tournament, second round
- Conference: Big Ten Conference
- Record: 23–10 (12–6 Big Ten)
- Head coach: Suzy Merchant
- Assistant coaches: Shane Clipfell; Rick Albro; Evelyn Thompson
- Home arena: Breslin Center

2009–10 Big Ten women's basketball standings
	Conf.				Overall
Team	W		L	PCT	W		L	PCT
No. 8 Ohio State†	15	–	3	.833	31	–	5	.861
No. 24 Michigan State	12	–	6	.667	23	–	10	.697
Wisconsin	10	–	8	.556	21	–	11	.656
Iowa	10	–	8	.556	20	–	14	.588
Purdue	9	–	9	.500	15	–	17	.469
Michigan	8	–	10	.444	20	–	13	.606
Penn State	8	–	10	.444	17	–	14	.548
Illinois	7	–	11	.389	19	–	14	.576
Northwestern	7	–	11	.389	18	–	15	.545
Indiana	7	–	11	.389	14	–	16	.467
Minnesota	6	–	12	.333	13	–	17	.433
† 2010 Big Ten tournament winner As of 3-27-2010; Rankings from AP Poll

The 2009–10 Michigan State Spartans women's basketball team represented Michigan State University in the 2009–2010 NCAA Division I basketball season. The Spartans were coached by Suzy Merchant and played their home games at the Breslin Center. The Spartans were a member of the Big Ten Conference and advanced to the NCAA tournament, where they lost in the second round to Kentucky.

== Offseason ==
- May 5: The Big Ten Conference office announced today that the Michigan State women's basketball team will face North Carolina in the third-annual Big Ten/ACC Challenge. The Spartans and Tar Heels are scheduled for a Thursday, Dec. 3 matchup at the Breslin Center.
- May 19: Michigan State head coach Suzy Merchant completed her first experience with USA Basketball. Merchant, Charli Turner Thorne and fellow assistant Julie Rousseau, took part in the three-day trials at the U.S. Olympic training center in Colorado Springs, Colo.
- Junior Kalisha Keane is representing Canada at the 2009 World University Games on July 1–12 in Belgrade, Serbia. Keane is one of 11 student-athletes on the squad. In addition to Keane, two other NCAA student-athletes made the team: Vermont's Courtney Pilypaitis and Delaware's Vanessa Kabongo.
- July 30: The Women's Basketball Coaches Association (WBCA), on behalf of the Wade Coalition, announced the 2009-2010 preseason "Wade Watch" list for The State Farm Wade Trophy Division I Player of the Year. Michigan State’s Allyssa DeHaan has been named to the 2009-10 preseason "Wade Watch" list, which is made up of top NCAA Division I student-athletes who best embody the spirit of Lily Margaret Wade. This is based on the following criteria: game and season statistics, leadership, character, effect on their team and overall playing ability.
- August 21: The 2009-10 preseason candidates list for the Women’s Wooden Award was released, naming 31 student athletes. Allyssa DeHaan from Michigan State was one of the candidates.

== Exhibition ==
Date	Opponent	Location	Time	Score
11/05/09	vs. Wayne State (Exh.)	East Lansing, Mich.	6:30 p.m.	MSU, 79-47
11/08/09	vs. Grand Valley State (Exh.)	East Lansing, Mich.	2:00 p.m.	MSU, 88-53

== Regular season ==
- The Spartans will participate in the Junkanoo Jam from November 27 to 28.

=== Roster ===
Number	Name	Height	Position	Class
1	Jasmine Thomas	5'7"	Guard	Freshman
2	Mandy Piechowski	5'9"	Guard	Senior
3	Porsche Poole	5'8"	Guard	Sophomore
12	Tracy Nogle	5'11"	Guard	Freshman
15	Cetera Washington	6'0"	Forward	Junior
20	Brittney Thomas	5'10"	Guard	Junior
22	Aisha Jefferson	6'1"	Forward	Redshirt Senior
24	Courtney Schiffauer	6'1"	Forward	Sophomore
25	Taja Wilson	6'1"	Forward	Redshirt Sophomore
30	Lykendra Johnson	6'1"	Forward	Redshirt Sophomore
32	Kalisha Keane	6'1"	Forward	Junior
33	Taylor Alton	5'11"	Guard/Forward	Sophomore
41	Allyssa DeHaan	6'9"	Center	Senior
45	Lauren Aitch	6'1"	Center	Redshirt Senior
50	Jasmine Holmes	5'10"	Guard	Senior
54	Kelsey Smith	6'4"	Center	Freshman

=== Schedule ===
Date	Opponent	Location	Time	Score
11/13/09	at Dayton	Dayton, Ohio	7:00 p.m.	74–77
11/15/09	at Detroit	Detroit, Mich.	12:00 p.m.	71–62
11/19/09	vs. Notre Dame	East Lansing, Mich.	6:00 p.m.	67–68
11/22/09	vs. Western Michigan	Grand Rapids, Mich.	4:00 p.m.	74–51
11/27/09	vs. George Washington	Grand Bahama Island	1:15 p.m.	78–47
11/28/09	vs. Oklahoma State	Grand Bahama Island	8:00 p.m.	93–90 (2 OT)
12/03/09	vs. North Carolina	East Lansing, Mich.	8:30 p.m.	72–66
12/06/09	vs. Indiana *	East Lansing, Mich.	12:00 p.m.	63–68
12/09/09	vs. Xavier	East Lansing, Mich.	7:00 p.m.	66–53
12/13/09	vs. Florida Gulf Coast	East Lansing, Mich.	2:00 p.m.	94–71
12/19/09	vs. Washington	East Lansing, Mich.	7:00 p.m.	69–52
12/21/09	vs. St. Bonaventure	East Lansing, Mich.	6:00 p.m.	67–59
12/28/09	at Wisconsin *	Madison, Wis.	8:00 p.m.	54–62
12/31/09	vs. Michigan *	East Lansing, Mich.	2:00 p.m.	86–71
01/03/10	at Indiana *	Bloomington, Ind.	12:00 p.m.	53–44
01/09/10	vs. Ohio State *	East Lansing, Mich.	2:00 p.m.	62–65
01/14/10	vs. Wisconsin *	East Lansing, Mich.	7:00 p.m.	45–48
01/17/10	at Penn State *	State College, Pa.	1:00 p.m.	60–68
01/21/10	vs. Purdue *	East Lansing, Mich.	7:30 p.m.	72–54
01/24/10	at Minnesota *	Minneapolis, Minn.	3:00 p.m.	66–57
01/28/10	at Northwestern *	Evanston, Ill.	8:00 p.m.	56–52
02/04/10	vs. Penn State *	East Lansing, Mich.	7:00 p.m.	65–44
02/07/10	at Iowa *	Iowa City, Iowa	4:30 p.m.	66–77
02/11/10	at Michigan *	Ann Arbor, Mich.	7:00 p.m.	50–45
02/14/10	vs. Northwestern *	East Lansing, Mich.	2:30 p.m.	68–55
02/18/10	vs. Illinois *	East Lansing, Mich.	7:00 p.m.	64–43
02/21/10	at Ohio State *	Columbus, Ohio	3:00 p.m.	71–68
02/25/10	at Purdue *	West Lafayette, Ind.	7:00 p.m.	79–64
02/28/10	vs. Minnesota *	East Lansing, Mich.	2:00 p.m.	70–50

== Big Ten Tournament ==
Date	Opponent	Location	Time	Score
03/05/10	Michigan * (quarterfinals round)	Indianapolis, Indiana	11:30 a.m.	61–50
03/06/10	Iowa * (semifinals round)	Indianapolis, Indiana	5:00 p.m.	54–59

== Player stats ==
Player	Games played	Minutes	Field goals	Three pointers	Free throws	Rebounds	Assists	Blocks	Steals	Points

== Postseason ==
=== NCAA basketball tournament ===
Date	Opponent	Location	Time	Score
03/20/10	Bowling Green (first round)	Louisville, Kentucky	12:11 p.m.	72–62
03/22/10	Kentucky (second round)	Louisville, Kentucky	7:21 p.m.	52–70

== Awards and honors ==
=== Preseason All-Big Ten Coaches Team ===
- Allyssa DeHaan, Sr., C, MSU

=== Preseason All-Big Ten Media Team ===
- Allyssa DeHaan, Sr., C, MSU

== Team players drafted into the WNBA ==
Round	Pick	Player	NBA club

== See also ==
- 2009–10 Big Ten women's basketball season
- 2009-10 Michigan State Spartans men's basketball team
