= 2009 Paradise Jam =

- Season: 2009–10
- Teams: 8
- Finals site: Sports and Fitness Center, Saint Thomas, U.S. Virgin Islands
- Champions: Purdue (men's); Notre Dame (women's Island); Rutgers (women's Reef)
- MVP: E'Twaun Moore, Purdue (men's); Skylar Diggins, Notre Dame (women's Island); Brittany Ray, Rutgers (women's Reef)

The 2009 Paradise Jam was an early-season men's and women's college basketball tournament. The tournament, which began in 2000, was part of the 2009–10 NCAA Division I men's basketball season and 2009–10 NCAA Division I women's basketball season. The tournament was played at the Sports and Fitness Center in Saint Thomas, U.S. Virgin Islands. Purdue won the men's tournament, the men's final game included a spectacular play where Purdue's Chris Kramer swam down the court in order to poke the ball from a dribbling Tennessee player, knocking the ball off another Tennessee player to give Purdue the ball. In the women's tournament Notre Dame won the women's Island Division and Rutgers won the women's Reef Division.

== Men's tournament ==
=== Bracket ===
5th Place Game; November 23
Northern Iowa | 81
Boston College | 69
7th Place Game
South Dakota State | 73
East Carolina | 82

Consolation 2nd Round; November 22
Northern Iowa | 74
East Carolina | 68
Boston College | 75
South Dakota State | 58

First Round; November 20
DePaul | 60
Northern Iowa | 52
East Carolina | 66
11 | Tennessee | 105
Saint Joseph's | 84
Boston College | 80
South Dakota State | 63
7 | Purdue | 74

Semifinals; November 22
DePaul | 53
11 | Tennessee | 57
Saint Joseph's | 60
7 | Purdue | 85

Championship; November 23
11 | Tennessee | 72
6 | Purdue | 73
3rd Place Game
DePaul | 58
Saint Joseph's | 51

== Women's tournament ==
The woman's tournament is organized as two divisions of four teams, each playing each other in a round-robin format.

=== Island Division ===
In the opening round, 20th ranked (AP) Oklahoma faced South Carolina. The Sooners opened up a 20-point lead in the first half which South Carolina cut to two points part way through the second half. Oklahoma then ran off nine consecutive points to expand the lead back to double digits, and went on to win 75–67. The other match up featured two top 25 teams, Number 5 (AP) Notre Dame, and Number 23 (AP) and San Diego State. The Irish held a 21-point lead in the first half, which was still 15 points at halftime. The Aztecs continued to chip away at the lead and cut the margin to two points with under 30 seconds to go, Brittany Mallory connected on three of four free throws in the final seconds to secure the win, 84–79. The win was the 500th of Notre Dame's head coach Muffet McGraw

On the following day, Notre Dame played South Carolina and won 78–55. Oklahoma faced San Diego State, and opened up a 47–15 halftime lead, then cruised to a win with a score of 87–48. On the final day, the two 2–0 teams faced each other for the championship. Although the Irish had an eight-point halftime lead, Oklahoma came back to take a three-point lead near the midpoint of the second half. Notre Dame then scored 20 consecutive points to take a commanding lead, and ended up winning the 2009 Paradise Jam Championship 81–71. Notre Dame's Skylar Diggins was named Island Division MVP.

| November 26 |
| Oklahoma | 75 |
| South Carolina | 67 |

| November 26 |
| Notre Dame | 84 |
| San Diego State | 79 |

| November 27 |
| South Carolina | 55 |
| Notre Dame | 78 |

| November 27 |
| San Diego State | 48 |
| Oklahoma | 87 |

| November 28 |
| Oklahoma | 71 |
| Notre Dame | 81 |

| November 28 |
| San Diego State | 55 |
| South Carolina | 58 |

=== Reef Division ===
In the opening round, Rutgers beat USC 66–51, while Texas beat Mississippi State 73–55. The following day Rutgers beat Mississippi State 62–54 while USC beat Texas 61–54. On the final day, Rutgers, with a 2–0 record had a chance to win the tournament outright, They lost to Texas 70–67, because they had beaten USC, who also ended with a 2–1 after a win against Mississippi State, they were crowned the 2009 Paradise Jam Reef division champions.

| November 26 |
| Rutgers | 66 |
| USC | 51 |

| November 26 |
| Texas | 73 |
| Mississippi State | 55 |

| November 27 |
| Mississippi State | 54 |
| Rutgers | 62 |

| November 27 |
| USC | 61 |
| Texas | 54 |

| November 28 |
| Texas | 70 |
| Rutgers | 67 |

| November 28 |
| USC | 60 |
| Mississippi State | 64 |
