= 2009–10 Louisville Cardinals basketball team =

2009–10 Louisville Cardinals basketball team may refer to:

- 2009–10 Louisville Cardinals men's basketball team
- 2009–10 Louisville Cardinals women's basketball team
