= 2009–10 Pittsburgh Panthers women's basketball team =

Intercollegiate basketball season

2009–10 Pittsburgh Panthers women's basketball

WNIT, First Round
- Conference: Big East Conference (1979–2013)|Big East
- Record: 16–15 (5–11 Big East)
- Head coach: Agnus Berenato
- Assistant coaches: Jeff Williams; Caroline McCombs; Yolett McPhee-McCuin
- Home arena: Petersen Events Center

2009–10 Big East Conference women's basketball standings
| | Conf. | | | | Overall |
| Team | W | | L | PCT | W | | L | PCT |
|---|---|---|---|---|---|---|---|---|
| Connecticut | 16 | – | 0 | 1.000 | 39 | – | 0 | 1.000 |
| West Virginia | 13 | – | 3 | .813 | 29 | – | 6 | .829 |
| Georgetown | 13 | – | 3 | .813 | 26 | – | 7 | .788 |
| St. John's | 12 | – | 4 | .750 | 25 | – | 7 | .781 |
| Notre Dame | 12 | – | 4 | .750 | 29 | – | 6 | .829 |
| Rutgers | 9 | – | 7 | .563 | 19 | – | 15 | .559 |
| DePaul | 9 | – | 7 | .563 | 21 | – | 12 | .636 |
| Providence | 7 | – | 9 | .438 | 19 | – | 15 | .559 |
| Syracuse | 7 | – | 9 | .438 | 25 | – | 11 | .694 |
| Marquette | 6 | – | 10 | .375 | 17 | – | 16 | .515 |
| South Florida | 6 | – | 10 | .375 | 15 | – | 16 | .484 |
| Pittsburgh | 5 | – | 11 | .313 | 16 | – | 15 | .516 |
| Louisville | 5 | – | 11 | .313 | 14 | – | 18 | .438 |
| Cincinnati | 4 | – | 12 | .250 | 12 | – | 18 | .400 |
| Villanova | 3 | – | 13 | .188 | 14 | – | 16 | .467 |
| Seton Hall | 1 | – | 15 | .063 | 9 | – | 21 | .300 |
† 2010 Big East tournament winner

The 2009–10 Pittsburgh Panthers women's basketball team represented the University of Pittsburgh in the 2009–10 NCAA Division I women's basketball season. The Panthers were coached by Agnus Berenato. They were a member of the Big East Conference and played their home games at the Petersen Events Center in Pittsburgh, Pennsylvania.

== Previous season ==
The 2008-09 Pitt women's basketball went 25–8, a program record number of wins, en route to their second consecutive NCAA Sweet 16 appearance and a final #15 national ranking in both the AP and Coaches polls. Point guard junior Jania Sims was injured during the first game of the season and redshirted. Pitt graduated all-time leading scorer Shavonte Zellous, who was a first round draft pick by the WNBA's Detroit Shock. Pitt also graduated second team all-Big East guard Xenia Stewart.

== Offseason ==
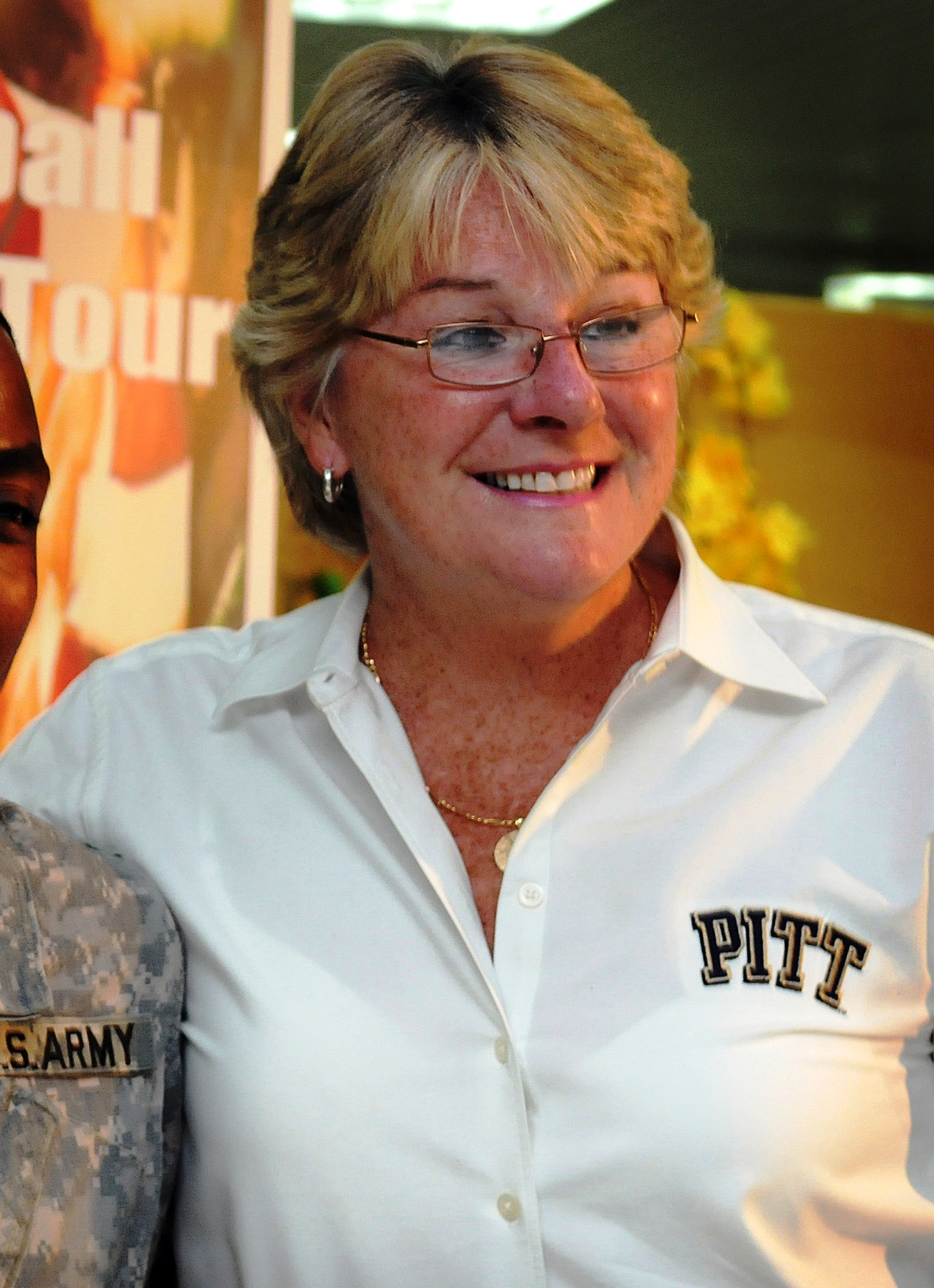
Pitt head coach Agnus Berenato poses for photos at Camp As Sayliyah, Qatar as part of a thank-you tour of overseas U.S military bases.

- May 19: Pitt head coach Agnus Berenato was awarded an honorary degree of Doctor of Humane Letters by Seton Hill University. She was recognized for her efforts in building the Panthers program into a national success. Her honorary diploma was presented to her by Seton Hill President JoAnne W. Boyle, Ph.D.. It stated, "Family, colleagues, students and friends describe you as 'genuine,' 'a master motivator,' 'a live ball of action,' 'a real go-getter,' 'loyal,' and finally 'amazing.'"
- May 22: It was announced that Shavonte Zellous' jersey would be inducted into the Women's Basketball Hall of Fame's "Ring of Honor".
- July 16, 2009: Pitt sophomore center Shawnice "Pepper" Wilson was named a finalist for the USA Basketball U19 World Championship Team. She participated in trials at the United States Olympic Training Center in Colorado Springs, Colorado, as the group was cut from 27 participants to the 14 finalists, but withdrew due to injury.
- August: Head coach Agnus Berenato was selected for and participated in a tour of overseas U.S military bases, with the goal of boosting "the morale and quality of life for deployed military personnel by providing entertainment from the home front."
- The Pitt women's basketball team was selected to play on national or regional television seven times for the 2009–10 season, including three games on the ESPN family of networks.
- Two freshman recruits joined the team: 5'9" guard Ashlee Anderson from Chicago, IL and 6'5" center Leeza Burdgess from Miami, FL.

== Roster ==
| Number | Name | Height | Position | Class | Hometown |
| 23 | Ashlee Anderson | 5-9 | Guard | Freshman | Chicago, IL |
| 42 | Leeza Burdgess | 6-5 | Center | Freshman | Miami, FL |
| 22 | Chelsea Cole | 6-3 | Forward | Junior | Lumberton, NJ |
| 10 | Taneisha Harrison | 6-0 | Guard | Junior | Bowie, MD |
| 32 | Selena Nwude | 6-5 | Center | Junior (RS) | Riverdale, MD |
| 24 | Sarah Ogoke | 5-9 | Guard | Sophomore | Sugar Land, TX |
| 50 | Kate Popovec | 6-3 | Center | Sophomore | Canfield, OH |
| 2 | Sophronia Sallard | 5-10 | Guard/forward | Senior (RS) | Syracuse, NY |
| 25 | Shayla Scott | 6-1 | Guard | Junior | Monroeville, PA |
| 14 | Jania Sims | 5-7 | Guard | Junior (RS) | Newark, NJ |
| 12 | Brittaney Thomas | 5-8 | Guard | Senior (RS) | Montgomery, AL |
| 40 | Shawnice "Pepper" Wilson | 6-6 | Center | Sophomore | Pittsburgh, PA |

== Schedule ==
Pitt's 2009-10 schedule.

| Date time, TV | Rank^{#} | Opponent^{#} | Result | Record | Site (attendance) city, state |
Exhibition
| Tue, Nov. 10*; 7:00 pm | | Seton Hill | W 91–60 | | Petersen Events Center (2,805); Pittsburgh, PA |
Non-conference regular season
| Tue, Nov. 17*; 11:00 a.m. | | North Florida | W 61–35 | 1–0 | Petersen Events Center (4,276); Pittsburgh, PA |
| Fri, Nov. 20*; 7:00 p.m. | | Florida | W 81–58 | 2–0 | Petersen Events Center (2,848); Pittsburgh, PA |
| Tue, Nov. 24*; 7:00 p.m. | No. 24 | St. Francis (PA) | W 75–70 | 3–0 | Petersen Events Center (2,269); Pittsburgh, PA |
| Fri, Nov. 27*; 1:00 p.m. | No. 24 | Appalachian State; Pittsburgh Thanksgiving Tournament | W 63–56 | 4–0 | Petersen Events Center (2,533); Pittsburgh, PA |
| Sat, Nov. 28*; 6:00 p.m. | No. 24 | Marshall; Pittsburgh Thanksgiving Tournament Championship Game | W 80–58 | 5–0 | Petersen Events Center (2,357); Pittsburgh, PA |
| Wed, Dec. 2*; 7:05 p.m. | No. 19 | at Youngstown State | W 89–37 | 6–0 | Beeghly Center (1,350); Youngstown, OH |
| Sat, Dec. 5*; 12:00 p.m. | No. 19 | Western Michigan | W 89–65 | 7–0 | Petersen Events Center (611); Pittsburgh, PA |
| Tue, Dec. 8*; 7:00 p.m. | No. 15 | Valparaiso | W 77–52 | 8–0 | Petersen Events Center (2,400); Pittsburgh, PA |
| Sat, Dec. 12*; 1:00 p.m., Big Ten Network | No. 15 | at Penn State; Pitt–Penn State rivalry | L 73–77 | 8–1 | Bryce Jordan Center (4,159); University Park, PA |
| Sun, Dec. 20*; 3:00 p.m. | No. 21 | at Austin Peay | W 76–75 ^{OT} | 9–1 | Dunn Center (410); Clarksville, TN |
| Tue, Dec. 22*; 6:30 p.m., Fox College Sports | No. 20 | at Western Kentucky | W 76–60 | 10–1 | E. A. Diddle Arena (1,442); Bowling Green, KY |
| Tue, Dec. 29*; 2:00 p.m. | No. 20 | Duquesne; City Game | L 63–72 | 10–2 | Petersen Events Center (3,018); Pittsburgh, PA |
| Thu, Dec. 31*; 1:00 p.m. | No. 20 | Mount St. Mary's | W 57–47 | 11–2 | Petersen Events Center (2,300); Pittsburgh, PA |
| Sat, Jan. 2; 8:00 p.m. | No. 20 | at Marquette | L 55–66 | 11–3 (0–1) | Al McGuire Center (2,584); Milwaukee, WI |
| Tue, Jan. 5; 7:00 p.m., CBS College Sports | | at No. 22 West Virginia; Backyard Brawl | L 59–63 | 11–4 (0–2) | WVU Coliseum (1,183); Morgantown, WV |
| Sun, Jan. 10; 1:00 p.m., ESPNU | | Rutgers | L 46–52 | 11–5 (0–3) | Petersen Events Center (2,925); Pittsburgh, PA |
| Sun, Jan. 17; 4:00 p.m., ESPNU | | No. 18 West Virginia; Backyard Brawl | L 54–69 | 11–6 (0–4) | Petersen Events Center (3,599); Pittsburgh, PA |
| Wed, Jan. 20; 7:00 p.m., Bright House Sports Network | | at South Florida | L 51–68 | 11–7 (0–5) | USF Sun Dome (864); Tampa, FL |
| Sat, Jan. 23; 2:00 p.m., Big East TV | | at Providence | W 72–58 | 12–7 (1–5) | Alumni Hall (703); Providence, RI |
| Sat, Jan. 30; 2:00 p.m., CPTV | | No. 1 Connecticut | L 56–98 | 12–8 (1–6) | Petersen Events Center (7,121); Pittsburgh, PA |
| Tue, Feb. 2; 7:00 p.m. | | Syracuse | L 80–87 ^{OT} | 12–9 (1–7) | Petersen Events Center (2,547); Pittsburgh, PA |
| Sat, Feb. 6; 2:00 p.m. | | at No. 3 Notre Dame | L 76–86 | 12–10 (1–8) | Joyce Center (9,149); Notre Dame, IN |
| Wed, Feb. 10; 7:00 p.m. | | No. 16 Georgetown | L 63–66 | 12–11 (1–9) | Petersen Events Center (511); Pittsburgh, PA |
| Sun, Feb. 14; 5:30 p.m., ESPN2 | | Louisville; Pink the Petersen | W 72–69 | 13–11 (2–9) | Petersen Events Center (4,168); Pittsburgh, PA |
| Wed, Feb. 17; 7:00 p.m. | | at Villanova | W 74–69 | 14–11 (3–9) | The Pavilion (577); Villanova, PA |
| Sat, Feb. 20; 2:00 p.m. | | Seton Hall | W 78–57 | 15–11 (4–9) | Petersen Events Center (2,745); Pittsburgh, PA |
| Tue, Feb. 23; 9:00 p.m., CBS College Sports | | at DePaul | L 57–68 | 15–12 (4–10) | McGrath Arena (2,024); Chicago, IL |
| Sat, Feb. 27; 2:00 p.m. | | at Cincinnati | W 72–60 | 16–12 (5–10) | Fifth Third Arena (820); Cincinnati, OH |
| Mon, Mar. 1; 7:00 p.m. | | No. 16 St. John's | L 65–77 | 16–13 (5–11) | Petersen Events Center (2,377); Pittsburgh, PA |
Postseason^{†} Big East Women's Basketball Championship
| Fri, Mar. 5; 12:00 p.m., Big East TV | No. 12 | vs. No. 13 Louisville; First Round | L 71–79 | 16–14 | XL Center (N/A); Hartford, CT |
Women's National Invitation Tournament
| Fri, Mar. 19; 7:00 p.m. | | at Toledo; First Round | L 58–70 | 16–15 | Savage Arena (1,868); Toledo, OH |
*Non-conference game. ^{#}Rankings from AP Poll. ^{†}Postseason ranks represent seeds in the applicable tournament. (#) Tournament seedings in parentheses. All times are in Eastern Standard Time.

== Rankings ==
Ranking movement Legend: ██ Improvement in ranking. ██ Decrease in ranking. ██ Not ranked the previous week. rv=Others receiving votes.
| Poll | Pre | Wk 1 | Wk 2 | Wk 3 | Wk 4 | Wk 5 | Wk 6 | Wk 7 | Wk 8 | Wk 9 | Wk 10 | Wk 11 | Wk 12 | Wk 13 | Wk 14 | Wk 15 | Wk 16 | WK 17 | Wk 18 | Final |
|---|---|---|---|---|---|---|---|---|---|---|---|---|---|---|---|---|---|---|---|---|
| AP | rv | rv | 24 | 19 | 15 | 21 | 20 | 20 | rv | -- | -- | -- | -- | -- | -- | -- | -- | -- | -- | |
| Coaches | 22 | 25 | 20 | 20 | 15 | 19 | 19 | 18 | 22 | rv | -- | -- | -- | -- | -- | -- | -- | -- | -- | |

== Player stats ==
| Player | Games played | Minutes | Field goals | Three pointers | Free throws | Rebounds | Assists | Blocks | Steals | Points |

== See also ==
- Pittsburgh Panthers women's basketball
- Pittsburgh Panthers men's basketball
- 2009–10 Pittsburgh Panthers men's basketball team
- Pittsburgh Panthers
- University of Pittsburgh
- Big East Conference
