= 2009–10 Villanova Wildcats women's basketball team =

Intercollegiate basketball season

2009–10 Villanova Wildcats women's basketball
- Conference: Big East Conference
- Head coach: Harry Perretta
- Assistant coaches: Joe Mullaney; Shanette Lee; Heather Vulin

2009–10 Big East Conference women's basketball standings
	Conf.				Overall
Team	W		L	PCT	W		L	PCT
Connecticut	16	–	0	1.000	39	–	0	1.000
West Virginia	13	–	3	.813	29	–	6	.829
Georgetown	13	–	3	.813	26	–	7	.788
St. John's	12	–	4	.750	25	–	7	.781
Notre Dame	12	–	4	.750	29	–	6	.829
Rutgers	9	–	7	.563	19	–	15	.559
DePaul	9	–	7	.563	21	–	12	.636
Providence	7	–	9	.438	19	–	15	.559
Syracuse	7	–	9	.438	25	–	11	.694
Marquette	6	–	10	.375	17	–	16	.515
South Florida	6	–	10	.375	15	–	16	.484
Pittsburgh	5	–	11	.313	16	–	15	.516
Louisville	5	–	11	.313	14	–	18	.438
Cincinnati	4	–	12	.250	12	–	18	.400
Villanova	3	–	13	.188	14	–	16	.467
Seton Hall	1	–	15	.063	9	–	21	.300
† 2010 Big East tournament winner

The 2009–10 Villanova Wildcats women's basketball team represented Villanova University in the 2009–10 NCAA Division I women's basketball season. The Wildcats were a member of the Big East.

== Offseason ==
- July 17: On July 8, 2009, the Women's Basketball Coaches Association (WBCA) announced its winners for the 2008-09 Academic Top 25 Team Honor Roll. Villanova finished 18th in the nation on the Honor Roll with a 3.346 team grade point average. The Wildcats have earned a spot for the fourth consecutive year on the Honor Roll.

== Regular season ==
=== Roster ===
Number	Name	Position	Class	Height
2	Rachel Roberts	Guard	FR	5-9
3	Jesse Carey	Guard	FR	5-10
4	Lindsay Kimmel	Forward	JR	6-0
5	Maria Getty	Guard	SR	5-9
10	Sarah Jones	Guard	SO	5-7
12	Kyle Dougherty	Guard	SR	5-10
20	Megan Pearson	Forward	RS FR	6-0
21	Tia Grant	Guard	SR	5-11
22	Devon Kane	Guard	FR	5-9
24	Amanda Swiezynski	Guard/Forward	JR	6-0
25	Emily Suhey	Forward	RS FR	6-1
33	Laura Sweeney	Forward	RS FR	6-2
45	Shannon Elliott	Forward/Center	JR	6-2
55	Heather Scanlon	Center	JR	6-3

== Player stats ==
Player	Games played	Minutes	Field goals	Three Pointers	Free Throws	Rebounds	Assists	Blocks	Steals	Points

== Team players drafted into the WNBA ==
Round	Pick	Player	NBA club
