= 2009–10 Connecticut Huskies women's basketball team =

Intercollegiate basketball season

2009–10 Connecticut Huskies women's basketball

NCAA tournament National Champions Big East tournament champions Big East regular season champions WBCA Classic champions
- Conference: Big East Conference (1979–2013)

Ranking
- Coaches: No. 1
- AP: No. 1
- Record: 39–0 (16–0 Big East)
- Head coach: Geno Auriemma
- Associate head coach: Chris Dailey
- Assistant coaches: Shea Ralph; Marisa Moseley
- Home arena: Harry A. Gampel Pavilion

2009–10 Big East Conference women's basketball standings
	Conf.				Overall
Team	W		L	PCT	W		L	PCT
Connecticut	16	–	0	1.000	39	–	0	1.000
West Virginia	13	–	3	.813	29	–	6	.829
Georgetown	13	–	3	.813	26	–	7	.788
St. John's	12	–	4	.750	25	–	7	.781
Notre Dame	12	–	4	.750	29	–	6	.829
Rutgers	9	–	7	.563	19	–	15	.559
DePaul	9	–	7	.563	21	–	12	.636
Providence	7	–	9	.438	19	–	15	.559
Syracuse	7	–	9	.438	25	–	11	.694
Marquette	6	–	10	.375	17	–	16	.515
South Florida	6	–	10	.375	15	–	16	.484
Pittsburgh	5	–	11	.313	16	–	15	.516
Louisville	5	–	11	.313	14	–	18	.438
Cincinnati	4	–	12	.250	12	–	18	.400
Villanova	3	–	13	.188	14	–	16	.467
Seton Hall	1	–	15	.063	9	–	21	.300
† 2010 Big East tournament winner

The 2009–10 Connecticut Huskies women's basketball team represented the University of Connecticut in the 2009–2010 NCAA Division I basketball season. The Huskies were coached by Geno Auriemma, as the Huskies played their home games at the Veterans Memorial Coliseum in the XL Center located in Hartford, Connecticut, and on campus at the Harry A. Gampel Pavilion in Storrs, Connecticut. The Huskies were a member of the Big East Conference and won their seventh NCAA championship against Stanford on April 6, 2010.

== Offseason ==
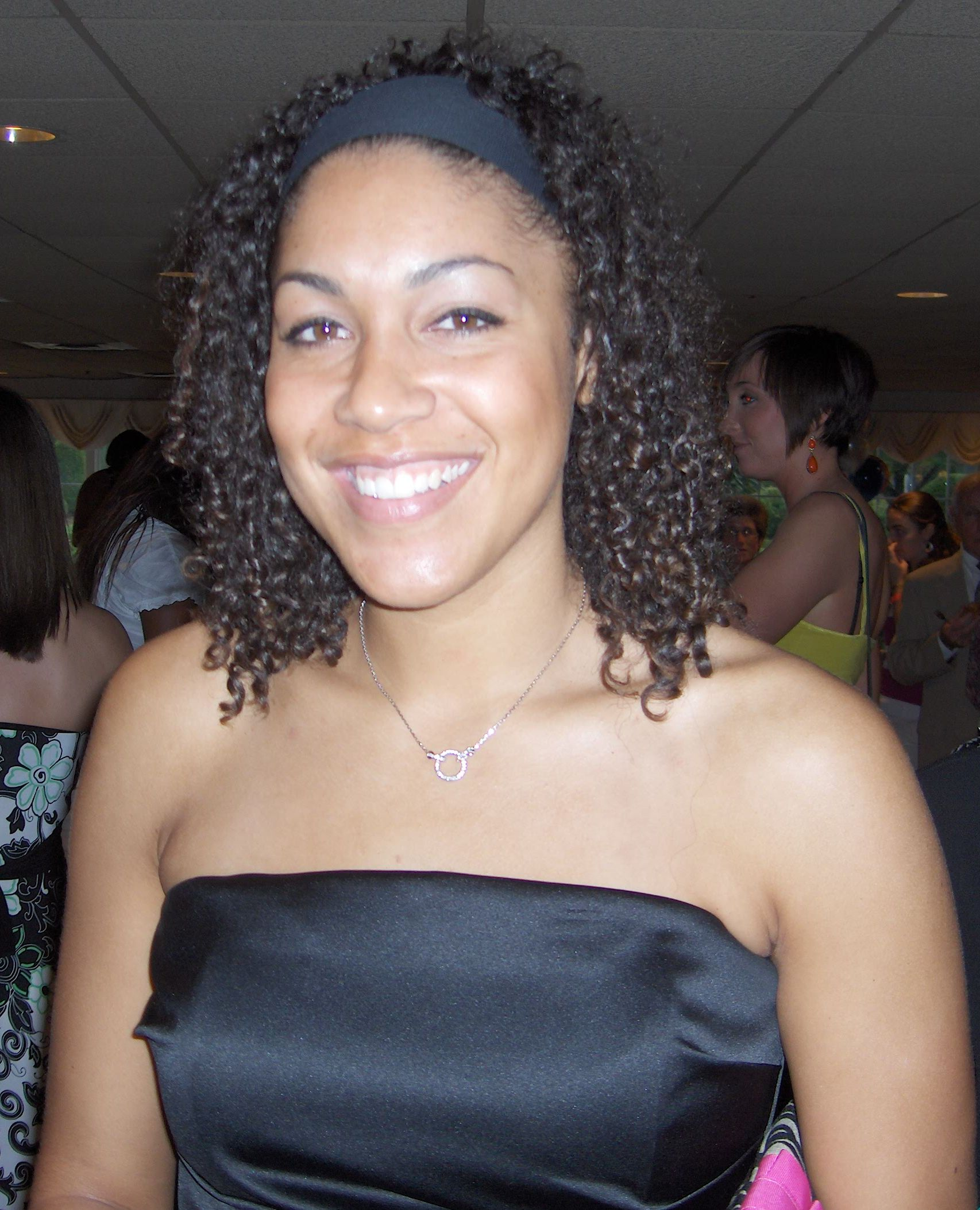
Marisa Moseley

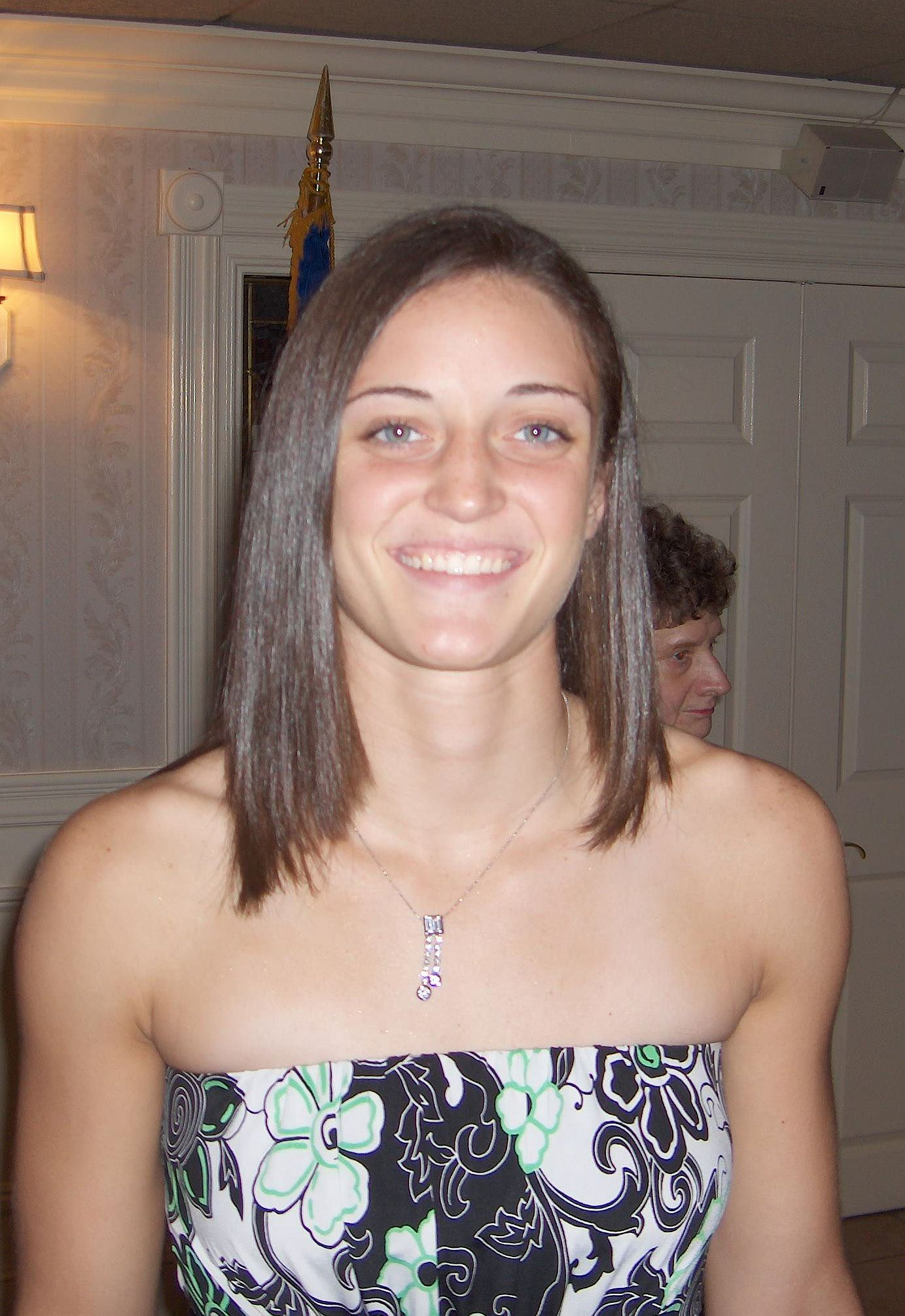
Kelly Faris

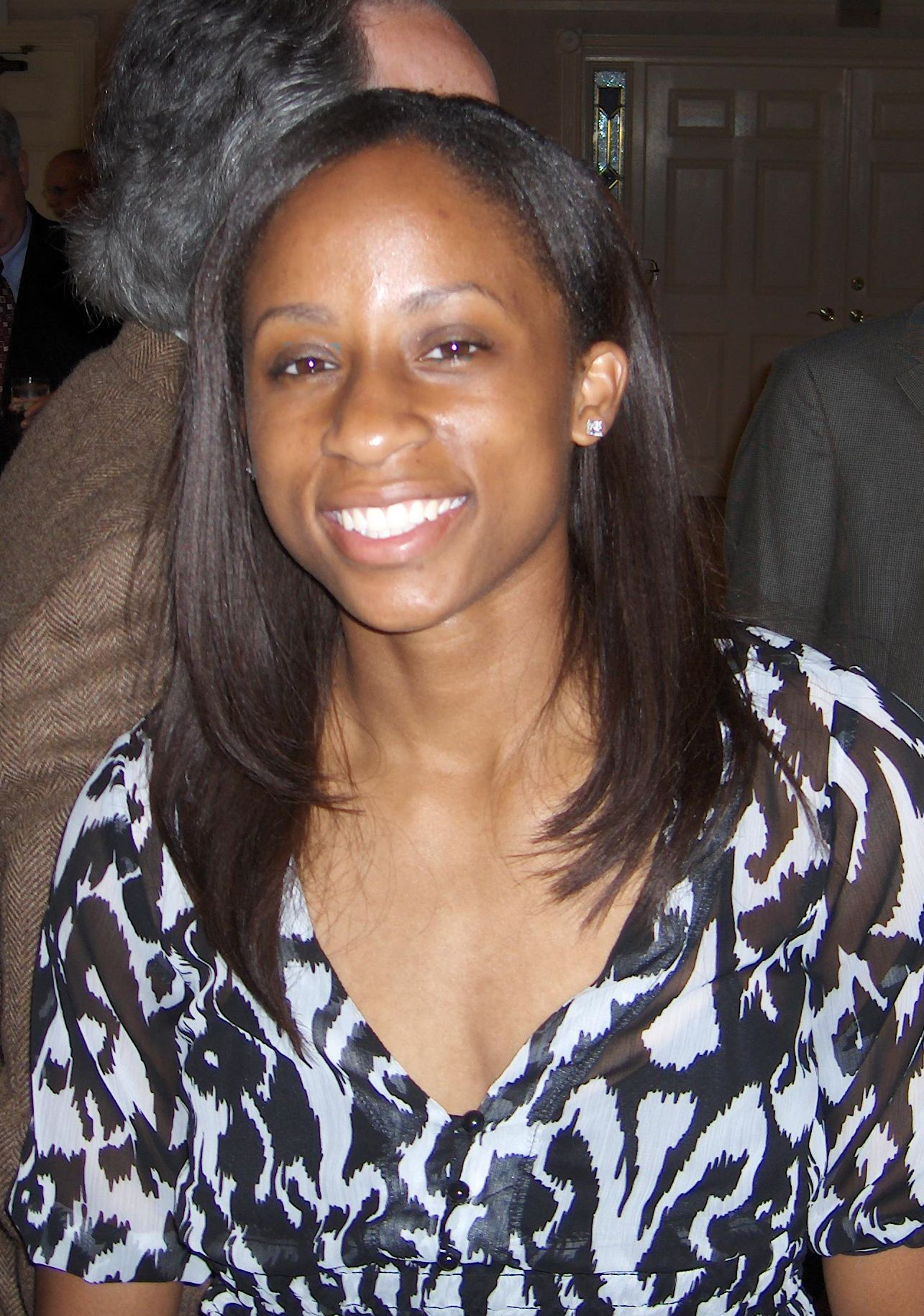
Lorin Dixon

- May 5: Jamelle Elliott, a 12-year member of Geno Auriemma's coaching staff was named head coach of the University of Cincinnati Bearcats women's team. She will be the school's eighth head women's basketball coach.
- May 18: Marisa Moseley was named women's basketball assistant coach at the University of Connecticut. Moseley works primarily with the post players in her new role. She spent the previous two seasons as an assistant coach on the women's basketball staff at the University of Minnesota. She also assists in all facets of recruiting and player development.
- June 8: Incoming freshman Kelly Faris named Indianapolis top high school female athlete.
- July 2: Huskies sophomore Tiffany Hayes scored nine points and added five rebounds as the 2009 USA Women's World University Games Team (2–0) posted a 93–59 victory over Great Britain (1–1). Senior Tina Charles contributed six points, two rebounds, a block and a steal in just 13 minutes of action.
- July 25: Rebecca Lobo became the first Connecticut player named as an inductee into the Women's Basketball Hall of Fame, leading a class of six inductees. Lobo helped UConn to its first national championship with an undefeated season in 1995. The six individuals in the Class of 2010 will be formally inducted as members of the Hall of Fame on June 12, 2010, in Knoxville, Tenn.
- July 30: The Women's Basketball Coaches Association (WBCA), on behalf of the Wade Coalition, announced the 2009–2010 preseason "Wade Watch" list for The State Farm Wade Trophy Division I Player of the Year. Three players from the Huskies, Tina Charles, Tiffany Hayes and Maya Moore, have been named to the 2009–10 preseason "Wade Watch" list, which is made up of top NCAA Division I student-athletes who best embody the spirit of Lily Margaret Wade. This is based on the following criteria: game and season statistics, leadership, character, effect on their team and overall playing ability.
- August 14: Lorin Dixon finishes four days at Point Guard College, run by Dena Evans
- August 18: ESPN announced that Notre Dame and Connecticut would be part of the first-ever ESPN women's basketball College GameDay broadcast.
- August 21: The 2009–10 preseason candidates list for the Women's Wooden Award was released, naming 31 student athletes. Tina Charles and Maya Moore from Connecticut were two of the candidates.
- September 22: UConn celebrated the undefeated national championship with a dinner for the team, athletic staff and fans.
- Senior Tina Charles and Junior Maya Moore were invited to the USA Basketball Women's National Team training camp, in preparation for the 2009 UMMC Ekaterinburg International Invitational. The team then will compete for the 2010 FIBA World Championship. Also on the 19 member team are former UConn players Renee Montgomery, Swin Cash, Asjha Jones, Sue Bird and Diana Taurasi. The coach of the National Team is UConn coach Geno Auriemma, although the team selections are made by USA Basketball.
- November 3: Maya Moore and Tina Charles selected to the preseason All-American team by the AP. Moore is only the seventh ever unanimous selection.

== Regular season ==
=== Pre-season ===
The Connecticut team opened the year ranked No. 1 in the ESPN Coaches poll and the AP Top 25 Poll, following a 39–0 record leading to a national championship in the prior season. In both cases, the polling results were unanimous. UConn graduated three seniors, Renee Montgomery, Tahirah Williams and Cassie Kerns, but only Renee was a regular starter. The team added one freshman, Kelly Faris, and Caroline Doty returned to the line-up after missing most of the prior season due to injury.

The two preseason games were wins against St. Rose College(85–44) and Vanguard (98–68).

=== Non-conference games ===
The defending national champions opened their season against Northeastern. The outcome of the game was never in doubt, with a final score of 105–35; the game was more about personal accomplishments than the game itself. Senior Tina Charles pulled down her 1000th career rebound while senior Kalana Greene scored her 1000th career point. The win would continue a consecutive streak started the previous year, then at 40 games. The game against Texas, played in San Antonio, the location of this season's Final Four, was expected to be competitive, as Texas was ranked tenth in the nation by the AP. However, UConn pulled out to a 21-point lead by halftime, and ended up winning by 25, 83–58.

Connecticut's next game against Holy Cross would mark the 20th game between the two teams, an annual competition going back to the 1985–86 season. At the start of the series, the schools were competitive, with the teams splitting the first four meetings. However, UConn has not lost since, and entered the game with a 17–2 series record. UConn prevailed 87–34.

After the WBCA Classic, UConn would play Vermont in a rematch of the previous year's NCAA opening round game. UConn won easily 84–42, on a night in which senior Tina Charles became the second leading rebounder in school history.

UConn's next opponent, Hartford, was coached by former UConn star Jennifer Rizzotti. Hartford had never beaten UConn, and this game would be no exception, with UConn winning 80–45 for the eleventh consecutive victory over the Hawks. In the next game, UConn easily beat Iona 90–35.

The Stanford game was one of the most anticipated games of the season. Both teams came into the game undefeated. UConn was ranked No. 1 in the AP writer's poll and the ESPN Coaches poll, while Stanford was ranked No. 2 in each poll. Stanford's last loss was to UConn in the 2009 NCAA Final Four game, while UConn's last loss was to Stanford in the 2008 Final Four game. UConn hadn't been behind in a game at halftime or later all season until this game, but Stanford entered halftime with a slim two-point lead. However, after trading baskets early in the second half, UConn pulled out to a 22-point lead (74–52) with five minutes left in the game, and coasted to their 49th consecutive victory, all of which were won with a double-digit margin.

UConn ended the calendar year with a 78–59 victory over 11th-ranked Florida State. The game was relatively close at halftime, 41–35, but UConn's Tina Charles scored 16 of her 24 points in the second half to help ensure a victory.

UConn took a break from conference games to play a home game against the University of North Carolina(UNC).

The first half wasn't just the best basketball Connecticut played; it might have been the best basketball it can play.

— Graham Hays,

At the time, UNC was ranked seventh in the country. Despite the prospect of a close game, it was never close. Tina Charles scored 25 points in the first half, single-handedly outscoring the entire UNC team. UConn lead at halftime 56–24, and go on to win by 41 points, 88–47. ESPN's Graham Hays called "the first-half play as good as it gets".

Connecticut had played ACC teams Florida State and North Carolina; on 18 January, they would play their third ACC team of the season, Duke. Just as North Carolina had been ranked seventh at the time of the game, the Duke team was the seventh ranked team in the country. The margin of victory would not be as large as the UNC game, but it was still a convincing win, with UConn outscoring Duke 81–48. In contrast to the UNC game in which the first half was decision, Duke would remain reasonably close at halftime, down only ten, 38–28, but UConn would stretch out the lead in the second half. Maya Moore hit six three point field goals in the game, and Kalana Greene scored 18 points.

Connecticut faced Oklahoma in a late, out-of-conference match-up on February 15. Oklahoma was ranked 12th in the nation, but UConn had faced higher ranked opponents, and won relatively easily. Midway through the first half, it appeared UConn was heading for another easy win, as they had doubled the Sooners score 24–12. However, Oklahoma brought the game back to a two-point margin at halftime, and took a one-point lead in the second half. Five minutes later, UConn had opened up a ten-point lead, and extended the lead to a final 16 point margin 76–60.

=== WBCA Classic ===
The WBCA Classic Tournament was held at the UConn campus 27–29 November 2009. Coach Geno Auriemma is the current president of the Women's Basketball Coaches Association. The four teams participating in the three-day round robin event were host UConn, Hofstra, Richmond, and Clemson. Richmond beat Clemson 86–67 in the first game. UConn easily beat Hofstra 91–46, but the game was notable for being Auriemma's 700th career win. Auriemma reached 700 victories the fastest of any coach in Division I history, reaching the mark in his 822nd game.

The following day, Clemson defeated Hofstra 69–68, while UConn defeated Richmond 86–37. On the final day of the tournament, Richmond defeated Hofstra 42–41, while UConn won the tournament with their victory over Clemson 87–48.

=== Conference games ===
UConn opened conference play against Seton Hall on 2 Jan 2010. Most away games against Seton Hall are played on campus, but this game was played at the Prudential Center in Newark. The result was never in doubt, as UConn won 91–24, their largest margin over a Big East team in seven years. UConn's second conference game was at home against the University of South Florida. UConn started out with an 18–2 run, but Charles and Moore got into early foul trouble, and had to sit on the bench. Nevertheless, UConn had a double-digit lead at halftime, leading coach Auriemma to quip, "This is the only place in America where you've got to apologize for being up 14 at halftime."

UConn's next game, against Cincinnati, was notable more for the coaching match up than the game. After twelve years as an assistant coach at Connecticut and four years as a player, Jamelle Elliott took the head coaching job at Cincinnati. This would be the first match up between Cincinnati and Connecticut since Elliot left Connecticut. UConn won easily 83–51.

UConn returned to Big east play after the UNC game with a game against Marquette at their arena. The game outcome wasn't in doubt, as Tina Charles had a double-double (23 points, 11 rebounds) leading to a 24-point halftime lead, and a final score of 68–43. The game was unusual for a rare coaching decision near the end of the game. UConn typically declines to attempt to score if the game result is not in doubt, and they are inbounding the ball with less than 30 seconds to play, preferring just to dribble out the end of the game. However, in this game, with 72 seconds on the clock, Coach Auriemma instructed his player not to even cross half-court, deliberately accepting a shot clock violation and a turnover. The announcers were unsure of the reason at the time, but subsequent remarks by Auriemma clarified that he felt the officials were not doing enough to stop rough play, and he didn't want to "put his players into any more physical danger by crossing midcourt".

UConn's game against Notre Dame on 16 January didn't tipoff until 9 pm, but the arena opened at 7:30 in the morning. The ESPN CollegeGame Day event, traditionally held at the campus on a men's basketball game, held its first ever College Game Day in connection with a women's basketball game. The campus, shut down for winter break, opened a day earlier than usual to allow students to return in time to attend GameDay. Thousands turned to be in the backdrop of the 10 am national coverage. Because the event occurred in the morning, the UConn team was able to participate.

Right now, if you took a poll of those award-voters who truly follow women's hoops, Charles likely would be the unanimous winner for national player of the year. And she should be.

— M.A. Voepel,

The game in the evening would pit two undefeated teams—UConn, ranked No. 1 in the country with a 16–0 record and Notre Dame, ranked No. 3 in the country, with a 15–0 record. Despite the closeness of the rankings, and records, the game would not be close. UConn pulled out to a 42–19 halftime lead, and coasted to a 24-point victory, winning 70–46. Tina Charles had a double-double (23 points, 13 rebounds), leading ESPN's Mechelle Voepel to call Charles "another one of UConn's all-time greats".

UConn continued their undefeated season with a win over Villanova, 74–35. This marked the first ever start for senior Meghan Gardler. While seniors traditionally get a starting role on senior day, the Villanova game was played near Gardler's hometown of Springfield Pennsylvania. Many friends and family members were at the game to see her play. The team, which normally would travel by plane to Pennsylvania, took the train, just for the experience.

Rutgers is known for its defense, but UConn's defense would prove to be superior, as UConn held Rutgers to 36 points, while scoring 73. Rutgers was the last team to beat UConn in the regular season, winning at their home in 2008, but on this day, the results would not be close. UConn next played Pittsburgh, but the story of the game was not the game result, which UConn won easily. 98–56, but the benchmark reached by Tina Charles, as she became only the sixth player in UConn history to score 2,000 points in her career.

The next conference opponent, West Virginia would be ranked No. 8 in the country at the time of the game, but had already faced strong teams this season, and had beaten West Virginia by 30 points in the previous year. This year's final score of 80–47 would produce a wider margin, but with a halftime margin of only 12, and a lead dropping to single-digits a few minutes into the second half, the game outcome appeared more in doubt than the final score would indicate.

The last time Connecticut played Louisville, it was for the national championship in April 2009. That game wasn't close, but this one would be less of a challenge. UConn tripled Louisville's first half scoring, leading to a 54–18 first half score, and cruised to a final score of 84–38.

DePaul was within nine points almost 15 minutes into the game, but Tiffany Hayes and Tina Charles started scoring, each ending up with 19 points for the game. The halftime lead was 20, and UConn started the second half with an 11–1 run to put the game away. The final score was 95–62.

Before the game against St. John's, Tina Charles was inducted into Huskies of Honor, to reflect her position as one of the most significant figures in the history of the team. Despite the emotion, she scored 25 points and a career high 21 rebounds to help lead UConn over the 24th ranked Red Storm in one of the closest games of the year, with a final score of 66–52. Only the 12 point win over Stanford was closer than the 14 point win against St. John's.

Connecticut did not have any trouble against Providence on 20 February, quickly building a 20-point lead and extending the lead in the second half, behind a career high points total of 26 from Tina Charles and 21 from Maya Moore. UConn has now won 237 consecutive victories against unranked opponents at home. Connecticut would continue their winning streak against Syracuse four days later, when Maya Moore had a season high 38 points and a career-high 20 rebounds in an 87–66 victory.

Connecticut played 11th ranked Georgetown with an opportunity to clinch the Big East regular season title. Tina Charles, who had tied her season high points total a week earlier, set a new season record with 33 points, hitting 14 of 16 shot. Seniors Kaili McLaren, Meghan Gardler and Jacquie Fernandes started the game along with Charles and Greene, to follow the tradition of starting seniors in their final home game. Although Georgetown started out strong, hitting three 3-pointers to take an early 9–4 lead, and extended it to 15–9, the largest deficit UConn has faced this season, the team retook the lead later in the first half and did not trail again, winning with a final score of 84–62.

The last regular season game was a rematch against Notre Dame. The usual Big East schedule has two games against one opponent—for several seasons, that opponent was Rutgers, but this season, it was the eighth ranked Notre Dame team. UConn won easily 76–51. Tina Charles set two UConn career records in the same game, becoming the all-time scoring leader, surpassing Nykesha Sales's record of 2,178 and became the all-time rebound leader, surpassing Rebecca Lobo's record of 1,268.

=== Roster ===
2009–10 Connecticut Huskies women's basketball team
Players
Coaches

Pos.	#	Name	Height	Year	Previous school	Hometown
F/C	21	Heather Buck	6 ft 3 in (1.91 m)	RS Fr	Stonington	Stonington, Conn.
C	31	Tina Charles (C)	6 ft 4 in (1.93 m)	Sr	Christ the King	Jamaica, N.Y.
G	30	Lorin Dixon	5 ft 4 in (1.63 m)	Jr	Christ the King	Springfield Gardens, N.Y.
G	5	Caroline Doty	5 ft 10 in (1.78 m)	So	Germantown Academy	Doylestown, Pa.
G	34	Kelly Faris	5 ft 11 in (1.8 m)	Fr	Heritage Christian	Plainfield, Ind.
G	13	Jacquie Fernandes	5 ft 9 in (1.75 m)	Sr	Stonington	Pawcatuck, Conn.
F	22	Meghan Gardler	6 ft 0 in (1.83 m)	Sr	Cardinal O'Hara	Springfield, Pa.
G	32	Kalana Greene	5 ft 10 in (1.78 m)	Sr	Timberland	Saint Stephen, South Carolina
G	3	Tiffany Hayes	5 ft 10 in (1.78 m)	So	Winter Haven	Lakeland, Florida
F	41	Kaili McLaren	6 ft 2 in (1.88 m)	Sr	Our Lady of Good Counsel	Washington, D.C.
F	23	Maya Moore (C)	6 ft 0 in (1.83 m)	Jr	Collins Hill	Lawrenceville, Ga.

Head coach

Geno Auriemma

Assistant coach(es)

Chris Dailey
Shea Ralph
Marisa Moseley

Legend

- (C) Team captain
- (S) Suspended
- (I) Ineligible
- (W) Walk-on
- Injured
- Current redshirt

Roster
Last update: 2013-08-23

=== Regular season schedule ===
XLC—Veterans Memorial Coliseum at XL Center

	Date	Time (EST)	Opponent / Event	Location	UConn points	Opp. points	Record
	5 Nov 09	7:30 p.m.	vs. St. Rose College e	Storrs, Connecticut (Gampel Pavilion)	85	44	
	9 Nov 09	7:00 p.m.	vs. Vanguard e	Hartford, Connecticut (XLC)	98	68	
1	14 Nov 09	2:00 p.m.	vs. Northeastern	Storrs, Connecticut (Gampel Pavilion)	105	35	1–0
2	17 Nov 09	9:30 p.m.	at Texas	San Antonio, Texas (AT&T Center)	83	58	2–0
3	20 Nov 09	7:00 p.m.	at Holy Cross	Worcester, Massachusetts (DCU Center)	87	34	3–0
4	27 Nov 09	7:30 p.m.	vs. Hofstra	Storrs, Connecticut (Gampel Pavilion)	91	46	4–0
5	28 Nov 09	7:30 p.m.	vs. Richmond	Storrs, Connecticut (Gampel Pavilion)	86	37	5–0
6	29 Nov 09	4:30 p.m.	vs. Clemson	Storrs, Connecticut (Gampel Pavilion)	87	48	6–0
7	3 Dec 09	7:30 p.m.	vs. Vermont	Storrs, Connecticut (Gampel Pavilion)	84	42	7–0
9	10 Dec 09	7:00 p.m.	vs. Hartford	Hartford, Connecticut (XLC)	80	45	8–0
8	20 Dec 09	6:00 p.m.	vs. Iona	Storrs, Connecticut (Gampel Pavilion)	90	35	9–0
10	23 Dec 09	5:30 p.m.	vs. Stanford	Hartford, Connecticut (XLC)	80	68	10–0
11	28 Dec 09	7:00 p.m.	at Florida State	Tallahassee, Florida (Tully Gym)	78	59	11–0
12	2 Jan 10	2:00 p.m.	at Seton Hall ß	Prudential Center, Newark	91	24	12–0
13	4 Jan 10	7:00 p.m.	vs. USF ß	Hartford, Connecticut (XLC)	84	42	13–0
14	7 Jan 10	7:30 p.m.	vs. Cincinnati ß	Storrs, Connecticut (Gampel Pavilion)	83	51	14–0
15	9 Jan 10	4:00 p.m.	vs. North Carolina	Storrs, Connecticut (Gampel Pavilion)	88	47	15–0
16	13 Jan 10	8:00 p.m.	at Marquette ß	Milwaukee, Wisconsin (Al McGuire Center)	68	43	16–0
17	16 Jan 10	7:30 p.m.	vs. Notre Dame ß	Storrs, Connecticut (Gampel Pavilion)	70	46	17–0
18	18 Jan 10	7:00 p.m.	at Duke	Durham, North Carolina (Cameron Indoor Stadium)	81	48	18–0
19	23 Jan 10	2:00 p.m.	at Villanova ß	Villanova, Pa. (The Pavilion)	74	35	19–0
20	26 Jan 10	7:00 p.m.	vs. Rutgers ß	Hartford, Connecticut (XLC)	73	36	20–0
21	30 Jan 10	2:00 p.m.	at Pittsburgh ß	Pittsburgh, Pennsylvania (Petersen Events Center)	98	56	21–0
22	2 Feb 10	7:00 p.m.	vs. West Virginia ß	Hartford, Connecticut (XLC)	80	47	22–0
23	7 Feb 10	12:00 p.m.	at Louisville ß	Louisville, Kentucky (Freedom Hall)	84	38	23–0
24	10 Feb 10	8:00 p.m.	at DePaul ß	Chicago, Ill. (McGrath Arena)	95	62	24–0
25	13 Feb 10	5:00 p.m.	vs. St. John's ß	Storrs, Connecticut (Gampel Pavilion)	66	52	25–0
26	15 Feb 10	9:00 p.m.	at Oklahoma	Norman, Oklahoma (Lloyd Noble Center)	76	60	26–0
27	20 Feb 10	1:00 p.m.	vs. Providence ß	Hartford, Connecticut (XLC)	85	53	27–0
28	24 Feb 10	7:00 p.m.	at Syracuse ß	Syracuse, New York (Carrier Dome)	87	66	28–0
29	27 Feb 10	12:00 p.m.	vs. Georgetown ß	Hartford, Connecticut (XLC)	84	62	29–0
30	1 Mar 10	7:00 p.m.	at Notre Dame ß	South Bend, Indiana (Joyce Center)	76	51	30–0

e Exhibition

ß Big East

== Big East tournament ==
=== Quarter-final ===
The Big East tournament started with first round action on Friday, 5 March 2010. By virtue of being one of the top four seeds, UConn earned a double-bye, with their first game scheduled in the quarterfinals on Sunday. Syracuse beat Seton Hall on Friday, then beat Providence on Saturday to earn the match up against the number one seeded team in the tournament. The game would never be close, with UConn leading at the half 44–17, and ended with a 77–41 victory. UConn's Tina Charles would tie her career high with 34 points, while Maya Moore would score the 2000th point of her career, ending the game with 16 points, 14 rebounds and 7 assists. The win would be UConn's 70th consecutive win, tying an NCAA Division I record for the longest winning streak in the history of women's college basketball, set by UConn in 2003.

=== Semi-final ===
UConn would break their own 70-game winning streak with a 59–44 victory over Notre Dame on March 8, 2010, earning their 71st straight victory; every single victory during their current streak has been by at least 10 points. The Huskies will play in the Big East Championship game on March 9, 2010, which will be their last game before the NCAA Tournament.

=== Big East Championship Game ===
UConn defeated West Virginia, 60–32, to improve their winning streak to 72 games, and making their season record 33–0. Kalana Greene's 15 points guided the Huskies to victory, and help her to earn the Most Outstanding Player award for the tournament. UConn closed the game on 27–4 run after leading 33–28 early in the second half.

Date time, TV	Rank^{#}	Opponent^{#}	Result	Record	High points	High rebounds	High assists	Site city, state
7 March 10; 2:00 pm, no	No. 1	Syracuse; Big East women's basketball tournament	W 77–41	31–0	34 – Tina Charles	14 – Maya Moore	7 – Maya Moore	XL Center; Hartford, Connecticut
8 March 10; 6:00 pm, no	No. 1	No. 7 Notre Dame; Big East women's basketball tournament	W 59–44	32–0	16 – Tina Charles	17 – Tina Charles	6 – Maya Moore	XL Center; Hartford, Connecticut
9 March 10; 7:00 pm, no	No. 1	No. 8 West Virginia; Big East women's basketball tournament	W 60–32	33–0	15 – Kalana Greene	12 – Kalana Greene	3 – Kalana Greene	XL Center; Hartford, Connecticut
*Non-conference game. ^{#}Rankings from AP Poll. (#) Tournament seedings in parentheses. All times are in Eastern Time.

== Postseason ==
=== NCAA Basketball tournament ===
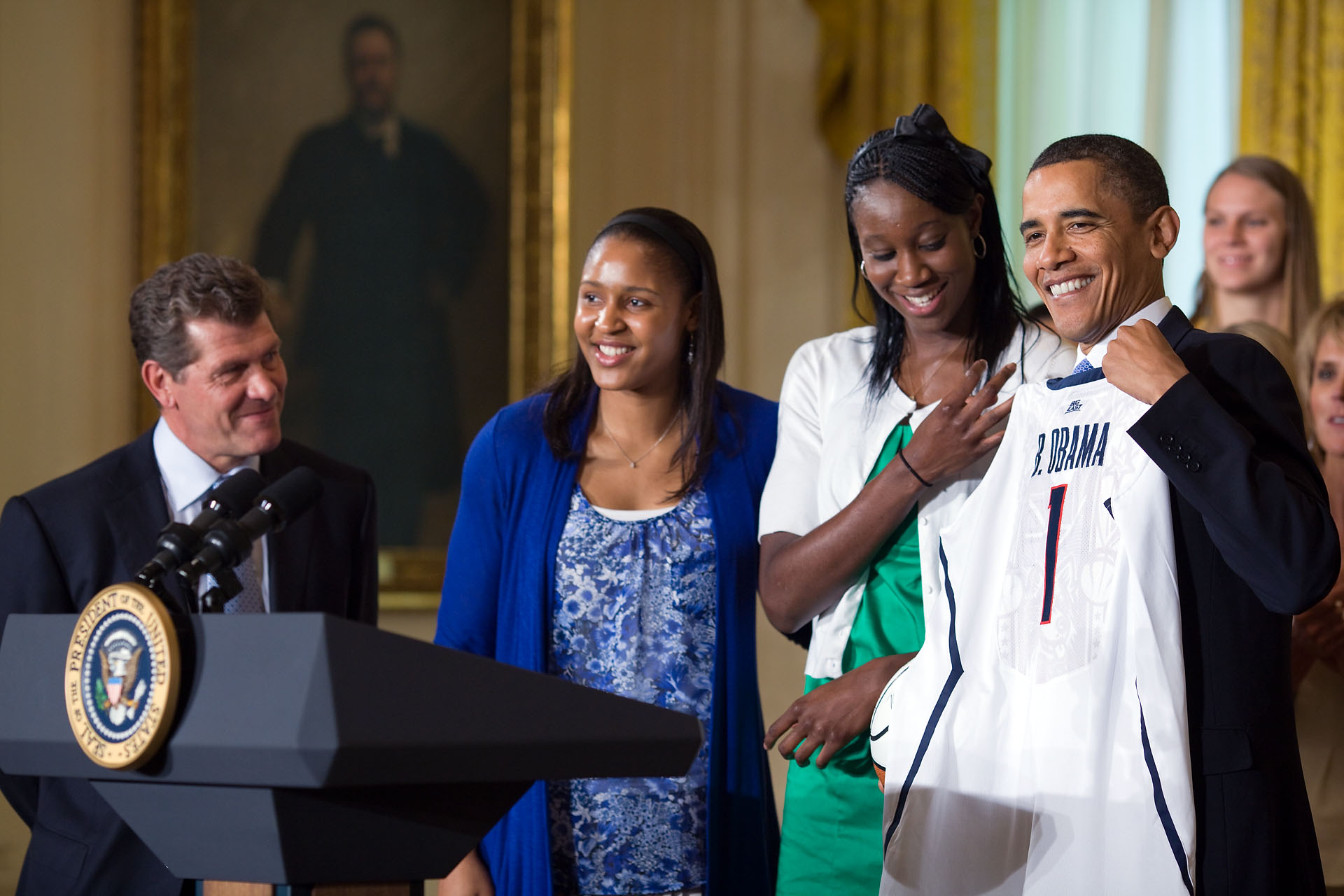
The Huskies at the White House

UConn was awarded a No. 1 seed (the number one overall seed) and assigned to the Dayton bracket. Their first-round game was against Southern, the winner of the SWAC tournament. Southern would score the first two points, but that would be their only lead of the game. Tina Charles hit her first nine shot attempts, on her way to a 22-point game, and teammate Maya More would add 21. Others would score as well, but those two scored enough to outscore the Jaguars. UConn's defense would hold the Jaguars to just ten second half points.

The second-round game was against Temple. The Temple team is coached by Tonya Cardoza, who was an assistant coach at UConn for 14 years, before she accepted the head coaching job at Temple prior to the start of the 2008–2009 season. The game also occurred on Auriemma's 56th birthday. UConn outscored Temple 55–12 in the first half, hitting 78% of their field goal attempts. The starting players ended up playing no more than half the game. Auriemma described the game as "pretty incredible performance".

The Sweet Sixteen game was against Iowa State. The two teams last played each other in 1999, when Iowa State knocked number one seeded UConn out of the NCAA tournament. This time, the result would be quite different. Maya Moore outscored Iowa State in the first half, despite sitting more than ten minutes with two fouls. The lead would grow to 50, at which time the starters all sat for the remainder of the game, and the final margin tightened. The final score was 74–36.

In the Dayton Regional final, there was a rematch of a game earlier this season against Florida State, and it was no contest as the Huskies rolled thanks to Maya Moore's 22 points and Tina Charles added 20 points and had 14 rebounds in a 90–50 rout of the Lady Seminoles. The win earned them a trip to the Women's Final Four and a date with Baylor and one of the most dominant players in women's basketball, Brittney Griner.

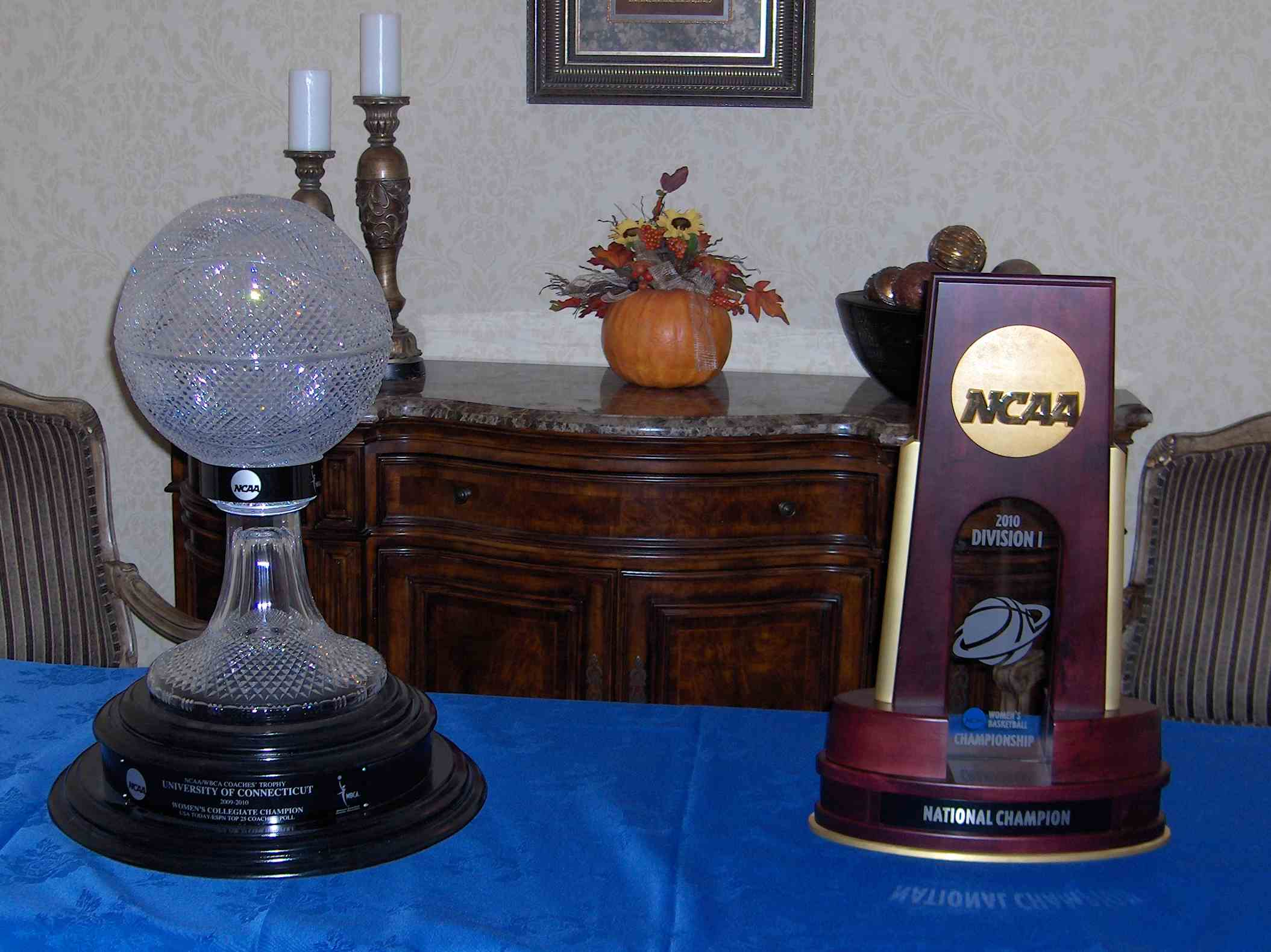
The Waterford crystal NCAA/WBCA Coaches' Trophy (left), awarded to the team finishing first in the USA TODAY ESPN Division I Top 25 Coaches' Poll and the NCAA Championship trophy

The Final Four semi-final game against Baylor started the way many games this season have started. Despite playing a top-ranked team, Connecticut went out to leads of 11–3 and 25–8. Baylor didn't quit, and by halftime, the 17-point lead was down to 13. UConn scored the first basket of the second half, but then Baylor scored twelve consecutive points, to cut the margin to three. Baylor's 6' 8" center Griner had five blocks to go along with 13 points and six rebounds. In contrast, UConn's center Charles had two blocks along with 21 points and 13 rebounds, while Maya Moore scored 34 points, the fourth highest point total in semifinal history. The final score in favor of Connecticut was 70–50, setting up a rematch with Stanford.

The National Championship game on Tuesday was against Stanford. Stanford's last loss was to Connecticut in December 2009, and Connecticut's last loss was to Stanford, exactly two years before, in the Final Four of 2008. The game started the way many games for Connecticut have started—just over two minutes into the game, Connecticut had a 5–0 lead. However, they would not score for over ten minutes, missing sixteen consecutive shots. Stanford would lead by as many as nine points, and would go to halftime with a 20–12 lead. The twelve points scored by UConn was the lowest first half total in the history of Connecticut basketball.

the best team in all of sports, any sport, any gender, by far

— Barack Obama, May 17, 2010,

Maya Moore lead the team after the half, scoring 11 of the team's first 17 points, including the basket that put Connecticut back into the lead, this time for good. Moore would end up with 23 points and 11 rebounds, and earned Most Outstanding Player honors for the Final Four. Connecticut would go on to win 53–47, ending their streak of double-digit victories, but winning their 78th consecutive game, resulting in their seventh national championship, their second consecutive undefeated season and their fourth overall undefeated season.

Date time, TV	Rank^{#}	Opponent^{#}	Result	Record	High points	High rebounds	High assists	Site city, state
21 March 10; 12:16 pm, ESPN2	No. 1	(16) Southern U. 2010 NCAA Division I women's basketball tournament	W 95–39	34–0	22 – Tina Charles	11 – Tina Charles	8 – Maya Moore	Ted Constant Convocation Center; Norfolk, Virginia
23 March 10; 7:06 pm, ESPN2	No. 1	(8) Temple; 2010 NCAA Division I women's basketball tournament	W 90–36	35–0	19 – Maya Moore	10 – Kelly Faris	5 – Caroline Doty	Ted Constant Convocation Center; Norfolk, Virginia
28 March 10; 12:04 pm, ESPN	No. 1	No. 16 (4) Iowa State; 2010 NCAA Division I women's basketball tournament	W 74–36	36–0	25 – Maya Moore	7 – Tina Charles	4 – Tiffany Hayes	University of Dayton Arena; Dayton, Ohio
30 March 10; 7:03 pm, ESPN	No. 1	No. 11 (3) Florida State; 2010 NCAA Division I women's basketball tournament	W 90–50	37–0	22 – Maya Moore	14 – Tina Charles	7 – Tiffany Hayes	University of Dayton Arena; Dayton, Ohio
4 April 10; 9:30 pm, ESPN	No. 1	No. 14 (4) Baylor; 2010 NCAA Division I women's basketball tournament	W 70–50	38–0	34 – Maya Moore	13 – Tina Charles	6 – Kelly Faris	Alamodome; San Antonio, Texas
6 April 10; 8:30 pm, ESPN	No. 1	No. 2 (1) Stanford; 2010 NCAA Division I women's basketball tournament	W 53–47	39–0	23 – Maya Moore	11 – Tina Charles	3 – Caroline Doty	Alamodome; San Antonio, Texas
*Non-conference game. ^{#}Rankings from AP Poll. (#) Tournament seedings in parentheses. All times are in Eastern Time.

== Awards and honors ==
=== Team ===
- The 1999–2000 NCAA champion University of Connecticut women's basketball team was recognized with induction into the UConn Huskies of Honor. This occurred at halftime of the UConn-Stanford game on December 23 at the XL Center. The Huskies of Honor program was launched in 2006.

=== Tina Charles ===
- All-BIG EAST First Team (unanimous)
- Big East Player of the Year
- AP All-American(unanimous)
- U.S. Basketball Writers Association's Player of the Year.
- State Farm Coaches' All-America Team
- AP National Player of the Year
- Naismith College Player of the Year
- No. 1 selection in 2010 WNBA draft
- John R. Wooden Award winner

=== Maya Moore ===
- Big East Scholar-Athlete of the Year
- Academic All-America of the Year award
- AP All-American(unanimous)
- State Farm Coaches' All-America Team
- State Farm Wade Trophy Player of the Year
- Honda Sports Award, basketball

=== Kalana Greene ===
- All-BIG EAST First Team
- Big East tournament Most Outstanding Player

=== Tiffany Hayes ===
- All-BIG EAST Second Team

=== Kelly Faris ===
- All-BIG EAST Freshman Team

=== Geno Auriemma ===
- Big East Coach of the Year

== Team players drafted into the WNBA ==
Round	Pick	Player	WNBA club
1	1	Tina Charles (basketball)	Connecticut Sun
2	1	Kalana Greene	New York Liberty

== See also ==
- UConn–Rutgers rivalry
- UConn–Tennessee rivalry
- 2009–10 Connecticut Huskies men's basketball team
- 2009–10 Connecticut Huskies women's ice hockey season
