= 2009–10 Cincinnati Bearcats women's basketball team =

Intercollegiate basketball season

2009–10 Cincinnati Bearcats women's basketball
- Conference: Big East Conference (1979–2013)|Big East
- Record: 12-18 (4-12 Big East)
- Head coach: Jamelle Elliott
- Assistant coaches: Mark Ehlen; LaRita Wilcher; Todd Moore
- Home arena: Fifth Third Arena

2009–10 Big East Conference women's basketball standings
	Conf.				Overall
Team	W		L	PCT	W		L	PCT
Connecticut	16	–	0	1.000	39	–	0	1.000
West Virginia	13	–	3	.813	29	–	6	.829
Georgetown	13	–	3	.813	26	–	7	.788
St. John's	12	–	4	.750	25	–	7	.781
Notre Dame	12	–	4	.750	29	–	6	.829
Rutgers	9	–	7	.563	19	–	15	.559
DePaul	9	–	7	.563	21	–	12	.636
Providence	7	–	9	.438	19	–	15	.559
Syracuse	7	–	9	.438	25	–	11	.694
Marquette	6	–	10	.375	17	–	16	.515
South Florida	6	–	10	.375	15	–	16	.484
Pittsburgh	5	–	11	.313	16	–	15	.516
Louisville	5	–	11	.313	14	–	18	.438
Cincinnati	4	–	12	.250	12	–	18	.400
Villanova	3	–	13	.188	14	–	16	.467
Seton Hall	1	–	15	.063	9	–	21	.300
† 2010 Big East tournament winner

The 2009–10 Cincinnati Bearcats women's basketball team represented the University of Cincinnati in the 2009–10 NCAA Division I women's basketball season. The Bearcats were coached by Jamelle Elliott, and played their home games at Fifth Third Arena in Cincinnati, Ohio. The Bearcats were a member of the Big East conference.

== Offseason ==
- May 5:Jamelle Elliott, a former student-athlete and assistant coach at the University of Connecticut, has been named the University of Cincinnati's eighth head basketball coach. Elliott has spent part of the last two decades with the Connecticut women's basketball program. She spent the last 12 years as an assistant coach. She has been a part of six national championships, including the Huskies' 2009 undefeated championship run, and won a title as a player, helping UConn to the 1995 championship, the first in the school's history.
- April 28: The Bearcats signed Shareese Ulis, a junior college transfer to a National Letter of Intent. Ulis will join the team for the 2009-10 academic year and have two years of eligibility remaining at UC. Ulis is a 5-7 guard from Trinity Valley CC (TX), where she averaged 12.0 points, 3.0 assists, 3.0 rebounds, and 3.0 steals per game. She also was an all-conference and honorable mention all-region selection during her time at TVCC.

== Exhibition ==
Date	Opponent	Location	Time	Score
Mon., Nov. 9	vs. Kentucky Wesleyan	Fifth Third Arena	7:00 p.m. ET	W 72-36

== Regular season ==
The Bearcats will compete in the Great Alaska Shootout from November 24 to 25.

=== Roster ===
Number	Name	Height	Position	Class
22	Shelly Bellman	5-10	Guard/Forward	Senior
5	Chanel Chisholm	5-11	Guard	Junior
32	Elese Daniel	5-11	Forward	Freshman
23	Carla Jacobs	5-7	Guard	Senior
52	Michelle Jones	6-1	Forward	Senior
35	Daress McClung	6-0	Guard/Forward	Freshman
20	Kahla Roudebush	5-8	Guard	Senior
14	Shanasa Sanders	5-7	Guard	Sophomore
30	Val Schuster	6-1	Guard/Forward	Sophomore
20	Bryonna Snow	6-1	Forward	Freshman
34	Stephanie Stevens	5-7	Guard	Senior
12	Shareese Ulis	5-7	Guard	Junior

=== Schedule ===
Date	Opponent	Location	Time	Score
Sun., Nov. 15	vs. Furman	Fifth Third Arena	7:00 p.m. ET	W 85-46
Wed., Nov. 18	at Indiana	Bloomington, Ind.	7:00 p.m. ET	L 57-64
Sat., Nov. 21	vs. Detroit	Fifth Third Arena	2:00 p.m. ET	W 65-58
Tue., Nov. 24	vs. Western Carolina	Anchorage, Alaska	TBA	W 67-54
Wed., Nov. 25	Alaska Anchorage	Anchorage, Alaska	TBA	L 48-49
Sun., Nov. 29	vs. Dartmouth	Fifth Third Arena	2:00 p.m. ET	W 55-35
Fri., Dec. 4	vs. Kentucky	Fifth Third Arena	11:00 a.m. ET	L 57-68
Sun., Dec. 6	at Xavier	Cincinnati, Ohio	2:00 p.m. ET	L 38-69
Sun., Dec. 13	vs. Butler	Fifth Third Arena	2:00 p.m. ET	L 48-65
Fri., Dec. 18	vs. Eastern Kentucky	Fifth Third Arena	7:00 p.m. ET	W 62-49
Mon., Dec. 21	vs. Valparaiso	Fifth Third Arena	7:00 p.m. ET	W 62-50
Tue., Dec. 29	vs. Wright State	Fifth Third Arena	7:00 p.m. ET	W 51-45
Sat., Jan. 2	vs. Louisville	Fifth Third Arena	2:00 p.m. ET	L 49-63
Thu., Jan. 7	at Connecticut	Hartford, Conn.	7:30 p.m. ET	L 51-83
Sun., Jan. 10	vs. St. Johns	Fifth Third Arena	2:00 p.m. ET	W 70-60
Sat., Jan. 16	at Rutgers	Piscataway, N.J.	2:00 p.m. ET	L 33-44
Tue., Jan. 19	vs. Georgetown	Fifth Third Arena	7:00 p.m. ET	L 56-60
Sat., Jan. 23	at Seton Hall	South Orange, N.J.	2:00 p.m. ET	W 64-47
Wed., Jan. 27	at DePaul	Chicago, Ill.	8:00 p.m. ET	L 63-71
Sat., Jan. 30	vs. South Florida	Fifth Third Arena	12:00 p.m. ET	L 47-64
Tue., Feb. 2	at Louisville	Louisville, Ky	7:00 p.m. ET	W 74-68 (OT)
Tue., Feb. 9	vs. Nortre Dame	Fifth Third Arena	7:00 p.m. ET	L 50-66
Sat., Feb. 13	at Syracuse	Syracuse, N.Y.	2:00 p.m. ET	W 66-62 (OT)
Tue., Feb. 16	at Providence	Providence, R.I.	7:00 p.m. ET	L 44-59
Sat., Feb. 20	vs. Villanova	Fifth Third Arena	7:00 p.m. ET	L 57-60
Tue., Feb. 23	vs. West Virginia	Fifth Third Arena	ET	L 43-64
Sat., Feb. 27	vs. Pittsburgh	Fifth Third Arena	ET	L 60-72
Mon., Mar. 1	at Marquette	Milwaukee, Wis.	8:00 p.m. ET	L 63-69 (OT)

== Postseason ==
Date	Opponent	Location	Time	Score
Fri., Mar. 5	vs. South Florida	Hartford, Conn.	8:00 p.m. ET	W 63-51
Sat., Mar. 6	vs. Rutgers	Hartford, Conn.	8:00 p.m. ET	L 44-70

== See also ==
- 2009-10 Cincinnati Bearcats men's basketball team
