= 2010 Big East women's basketball tournament =

- Tournament Logo
- Classification: Division I
- Season: 2009–10
- Teams: 16
- Site: XL Center; Hartford, Connecticut
- Champions: Connecticut (16th title)
- Winning coach: Geno Auriemma (16th title)
- MVP: Kalana Greene (Connecticut)
- Television: BE.tv, ESPN360.com, ESPNU, ESPN

The 2010 Big East women's basketball tournament took place in March 2010 at the XL Center in Hartford, Connecticut. The winner will receive the Big East Conference's automatic bid to the 2010 NCAA tournament. This was the second consecutive year Big East tournament to include all 16 of the conference's teams. The teams finishing 9 through 16 in the regular season standings played first round games, while teams 5 through 8 received byes to the second round. The top 4 teams during the regular season received double-byes to the quarterfinals.

During the tournament, top-ranked Connecticut broke its own NCAA record for consecutive wins. The Huskies extended their streak to a record-setting 71 with a 59–44 win over Notre Dame in the semifinals. The Huskies went on to win the tournament with a 60–32 pasting of West Virginia.

== Final regular season standings ==
2009–10 Big East Women's Basketball standings
Seed	School	Conf	Overall	Tiebreaker
#1	Connecticut‡	16-0	30-0	
#2	West Virginia	13-3	26-4	1-0 vs GTWN
#3	Georgetown	13-3	25-5	0-1 vs WVU
#4	St. John's	12-4	24-5	1-0 vs ND
#5	Notre Dame	12-4	25-4	0-1 vs STJ
#6	Rutgers	9-7	17-13	1-0 vs DPL
#7	DePaul	9-7	20-10	0-1 vs RUT
#8	Providence	7-9	16-13	1-0 vs SYR
#9	Syracuse	7-9	20-9	0-1 vs PROV
#10	Marquette	6-10	15-14	1-0 vs USF
#11	South Florida	6-10	15-14	0-1 vs MARQ
#12	Pittsburgh	5-11	16-13	1-0 vs LOU
#13	Louisville	5-11	13-16	0-1 vs PITT
#14	Cincinnati	4-12	11-17	
#15	Villanova	3-13	14-15	
#16	Seton Hall	1-15	9-20	

‡ Regular season Big East champion

== Bracket ==
First round Friday, March 5
12	Pittsburgh	71
13	Louisville	79
9	Syracuse	65
16	Seton Hall	42

Second round Saturday, March 6
13	Louisville	49
5	Notre Dame	89
9	Syracuse	76
8	Providence	71

Quarterfinals; Sunday, March 7
5	Notre Dame	75
4	St. John's	67
9	Syracuse	41
1	Connecticut	77

Semifinals; Monday, March 8
5	Notre Dame	44
1	Connecticut	59

First round Friday, March 5
10	Marquette	53
15	Villanova	49
11	South Florida	51
14	Cincinnati	63

Second round Saturday, March 6
10	Marquette	54
7	DePaul	64
14	Cincinnati	44
6	Rutgers	70

Quarterfinals; Sunday, March 7
7	DePaul	41
2	West Virginia	47
6	Rutgers	63^{2OT}
3	Georgetown	56

Semifinals; Monday, March 8
2	West Virginia	56
6	Rutgers	49

=== Championship game ===
Big East tournament Final; Tuesday, March 9
1	Connecticut	60
2	West Virginia	32
