= 2009 US Virgin Islands Paradise Jam (women) =

The tenth annual 2009 US Virgin Islands Paradise Jam was a women's basketball tournament that took place November 26–28, 2009. Eight teams from the NCAA were invited to participate in the tournament. The teams were separated into two brackets, the Reef Division and the Island Division. The Reef Division consisted of Mississippi State, Rutgers, Southern California and Texas. The Island Division consisted of Notre Dame, Oklahoma, San Diego State and South Carolina

== Reef Division ==
=== Schedule ===
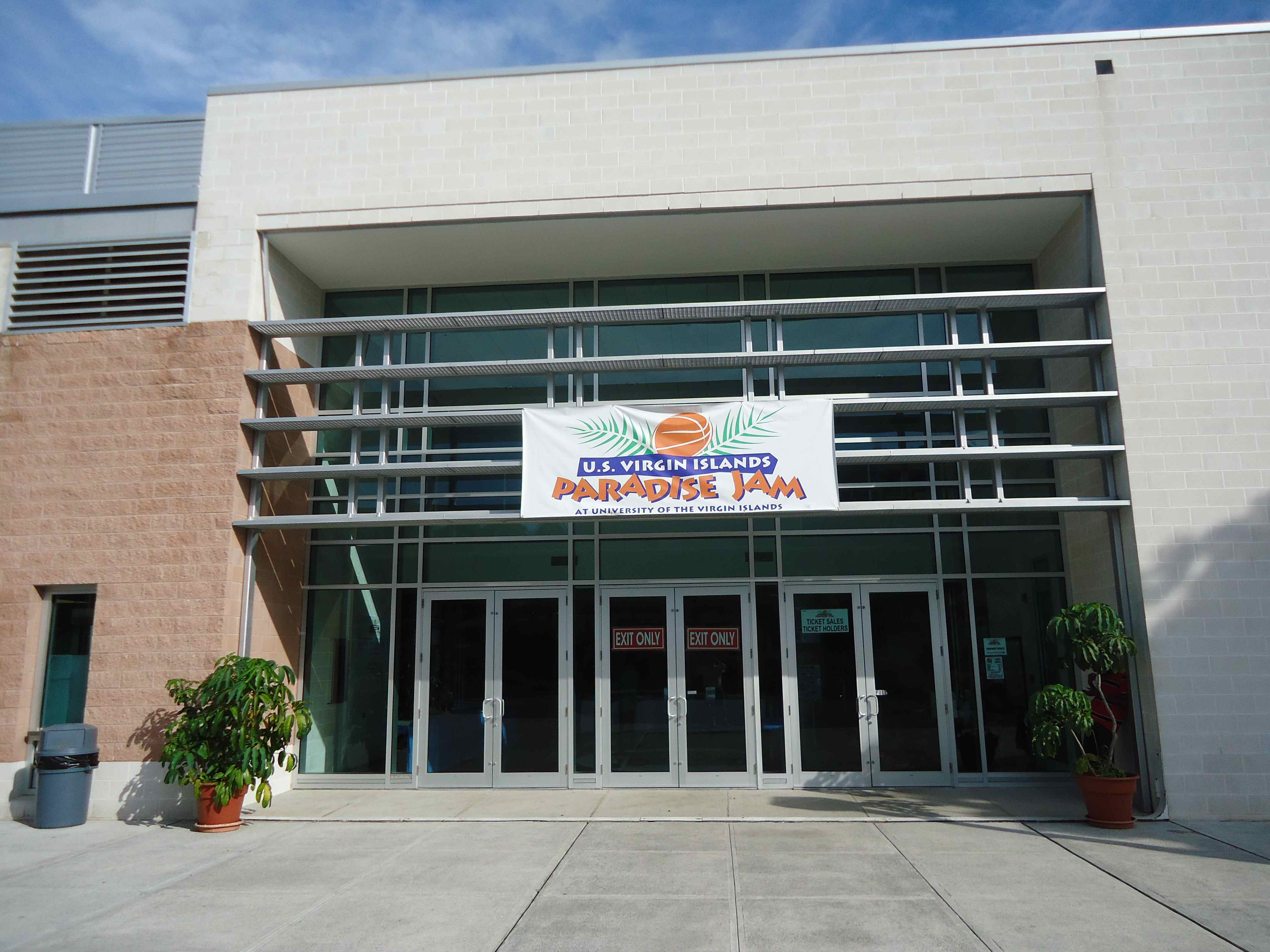
Sports and Fitness Center

- Games were played at the U.V.I. Sports and Fitness Center, the Caribbean's premier basketball facility located in Charlotte Amalie, U.S. Virgin Islands.

Date	Time	Visiting Team	Home Team
Nov. 26	7:00 PM	Southern California	Rutgers
Nov. 26	9:30 PM	Mississippi State	Texas
Nov. 27	7:00 PM	Rutgers	Mississippi State
Nov. 27	9:30 PM	Texas	Southern California
Nov. 28	7:00 PM	Southern California	Mississippi State
Nov. 28	9:30 PM	Texas	Rutgers

=== Final standings ===
^{†} Indicates team advanced directly to the championship game

* Indicates team advanced to the semifinal game

Reef Division	W	L
Mississippi State	0	3
Rutgers	2	1
USC	2	1
Texas	2	1

=== All Stars ===
- MVP: Brianna Butler, Syracuse
- Brittney Sykes, Syracuse
- Courtney Walker, Texas A&M
- Brady Sanders, Texas
- Ariel Hearn, Memphis

== Island Division ==
=== Schedule ===
Date	Time	Visiting Team	Home Team	Score	Leading Scorer	Leading Rebounder
Nov. 26	2:00 PM	South Carolina	Oklahoma			
Nov. 26	4:30 PM	San Diego State	Notre Dame	ND, 84-79		
Nov. 27	2:00 PM	Notre Dame	South Carolina	ND, 78-55		
Nov. 27	4:30 PM	Oklahoma	San Diego State			
Nov. 28	2:00 PM	San Diego State	South Carolina			
Nov. 28	4:30 PM	Oklahoma	Notre Dame	ND, 81-71	Danielle Robinson (OK), 26	Olajuwon (OK), 7, Bruszewski (ND) 7, Mallory (ND) 7

=== Final standings ===
^{†} Indicates team advanced directly to the championship game * Indicates team advanced to the semifinal game

Reef Division	W	L
Notre Dame	3	0
Oklahoma	2	1
South Carolina	1	2
San Diego State	0	3

=== All Stars ===
- MVP: Skylar Diggins – Notre Dame
- Danielle Robinson (Oklahoma)
- Amanda Thompson (Oklahoma)
- Valerie Nainima (South Carolina)
- Melissa Lechlitner (Notre Dame)
- Jene Morris (SDSU)

== See also ==
- Paradise Jam Tournament
