= 2010 Women's Basketball Invitational =

American women's college basketball tournament

- Season: 2009–10
- Teams: 16
- Champions: Appalachian State

The 2010 Women's Basketball Invitational (WBI) was a single-elimination tournament of 16 National Collegiate Athletic Association (NCAA) Division I teams that did not participate in the 2010 NCAA Division I women's basketball tournament or 2010 Women's National Invitation Tournament. This was the inaugural edition of the WBI. In the championship game, the Appalachian State Mountaineers defeated the Memphis Tigers.

== West Region ==
1st Round; March 17,18
1	Memphis	72
8	UMKC	68
4	Wichita State	67
5	Akron	61
2	Texas A&M–Corpus Christi	97
7	Cal State Bakersfield	89
3	Washington	75
6	Portland	44

Quarterfinals; March 21
1	Memphis	74
4	Wichita State	58
2	Texas A&M–Corpus Christi	59
3	Washington	58

Semi-finals; March 25
1	Memphis	80
2	Texas A&M–Corpus Christi	55

== East Region ==
1. 7 Morehead State hosted a first round game.

1st Round; March 17,18
1	Appalachian State	62
8	Charleston Southern	47
4	Towson	55
5	Fairfield	69
2	College of Charleston	67
7	Morehead State	59
3	Louisville	59
6	Bradley	69

Quarterfinals; March 21
1	Appalachian State	59
5	Fairfield	36
2	College of Charleston	76
6	Bradley	66

Semi-finals; March 25
1	Appalachian State	77
2	College of Charleston	58

== WBI Championship Game ==
The WBI Championship Game was hosted by Appalachian State.

Championship game March 27
1W	Memphis	71
1E	Appalachian State	79
