= 2009–10 Rutgers Scarlet Knights women's basketball team =

Intercollegiate basketball season

2009–10 Rutgers Scarlet Knights women's basketball

NCAA tournament, First round
- Conference: Big East Conference (1979–2013)
- Head coach: C. Vivian Stringer
- Assistant coaches: E. Carlene Mitchell; Ronald Hughey
- Home arena: Louis Brown Athletic Center

2009–10 Big East Conference women's basketball standings
| | Conf. | | | | Overall |
| Team | W | | L | PCT | W | | L | PCT |
|---|---|---|---|---|---|---|---|---|
| Connecticut | 16 | – | 0 | 1.000 | 39 | – | 0 | 1.000 |
| West Virginia | 13 | – | 3 | .813 | 29 | – | 6 | .829 |
| Georgetown | 13 | – | 3 | .813 | 26 | – | 7 | .788 |
| St. John's | 12 | – | 4 | .750 | 25 | – | 7 | .781 |
| Notre Dame | 12 | – | 4 | .750 | 29 | – | 6 | .829 |
| Rutgers | 9 | – | 7 | .563 | 19 | – | 15 | .559 |
| DePaul | 9 | – | 7 | .563 | 21 | – | 12 | .636 |
| Providence | 7 | – | 9 | .438 | 19 | – | 15 | .559 |
| Syracuse | 7 | – | 9 | .438 | 25 | – | 11 | .694 |
| Marquette | 6 | – | 10 | .375 | 17 | – | 16 | .515 |
| South Florida | 6 | – | 10 | .375 | 15 | – | 16 | .484 |
| Pittsburgh | 5 | – | 11 | .313 | 16 | – | 15 | .516 |
| Louisville | 5 | – | 11 | .313 | 14 | – | 18 | .438 |
| Cincinnati | 4 | – | 12 | .250 | 12 | – | 18 | .400 |
| Villanova | 3 | – | 13 | .188 | 14 | – | 16 | .467 |
| Seton Hall | 1 | – | 15 | .063 | 9 | – | 21 | .300 |
† 2010 Big East tournament winner

The 2009–10 Rutgers Scarlet Knights women's basketball team represented the Rutgers University in the 2009–10 NCAA Division I basketball season. The Scarlet Knights were coached by C. Vivian Stringer with Associate Head Coach E. Carlene Mitchell. The Scarlet Knights were a member of the Big East Conference.

== Offseason ==
- May 4 Rutgers women’s basketball will participate in the 2009 US Virgin Islands Paradise Jam at University of Virgin Islands. The event is celebrating its tenth anniversary and this marks the Scarlet Knights’ third appearance in the competitive tournament. Rutgers will face Southern California on Thanksgiving Day, Thursday, Nov. 26 at 7:00 p.m. Games will be played at the U.V.I. Sports and Fitness Center, the Caribbean’s premier basketball facility located in Charlotte Amalie, St. Thomas.
- May 7: Rutgers junior Epiphanny Prince and freshman Nikki Speed have accepted invitations to attend the 2009 USA Basketball National Team Trials.
- May 15 Forward/Center Monique Oliver Monique Oliver will suit up for Rutgers University beginning in the fall of 2009, Rutgers head coach has announced. Oliver, a 6-3 post player, averaged 11.5 points, 9.2 rebounds, 2.4 blocked shots and 2.0 assists per game as a senior at Long Beach Poly High School. She was the No. 6 ranked prospect, according to ESPN’s HoopGurlz, in the 2009 class.
- May 19: Ronald Hughey has been named an assistant coach with the Rutgers women’s basketball program
- July 1: Rutgers will play in the eighth annual Jimmy V Women’s Classic when the Scarlet Knights host Florida on Dec. 7. This marks the fourth straight season the Scarlet Knights will take part in the game. They beat Georgia 45-34 last season. The games are part of the fundraising effort for the V Foundation for Cancer Research, which is named for the late Jim Valvano, who led North Carolina State to the national championship in 1983.
- July 7: Pat Summitt and C. Vivian Stringer will oppose each other in the fourth annual Maggie Dixon Classic. The women’s doubleheader will be played Dec. 13 at Madison Square Garden. The two Hall of Fame coaches teams will meet in regular season play for the seventh straight year. Baylor and freshman star Brittney Griner will face Boston College in the other contest.

The two teams played once before at Madison Square Garden. Tennessee won 68-54 in 1999. Baylor will be making its first appearance at MSG.

== Regular season ==
=== Schedule ===
| Date | Location | Opponent | Scarlet Knights points | Opp. points | Record |
|---|---|---|---|---|---|
| Nov. 15 | Piscataway, NJ | No. 2 Stanford | 66 | 81 | 0–1 |
| Nov. 17 | Piscataway, NJ | Kean | 85 | 49 | 1–1 |
| Nov. 19 | Piscataway, NJ | Boston College | 59 | 53 | 2–1 |
| Nov. 22 | Athens, GA | Georgia | 48 | 49 | 2–2 |
| Nov. 26 | St. Thomas, VI (Paradise Jam) | USC | 66 | 51 | 3–2 |
| Nov. 27 | St. Thomas, VI (Paradise Jam) | Mississippi State | 62 | 54 | 4–2 |
| Nov. 28 | St. Thomas, VI (Paradise Jam) | Texas | 67 | 70 | 4–3 |
| Dec. 2 | Piscataway, NJ | Temple | 51 | 62 | 4–4 |
| Dec. 5 | Princeton, NJ | Princeton | 60 | 50 | 5–4 |
| Dec. 7 | Piscataway, NJ | Florida (Jimmy V Classic) | 51 | 38 | 6–4 |
| Dec. 10 | Piscataway, NJ | Prairie View A&M | 50 | 45 | 7–4 |
| Dec. 13 | New York, NY | No. 4 Tennessee (Maggie Dixon Classic) | 54 | 68 | 7–5 |
| Dec. 20 | Piscataway, NJ | Central Connecticut | 62 | 53 | 8–5 |
| Dec. 30 | Washington, D.C. | George Washington | 43 | 45 | 8–6 |
| Jan. 2 | Piscataway, NJ | DePaul | 60 | 57 | 9–6 (1–0) |
| Jan. 10 | Pittsburgh, PA | Pittsburgh | 52 | 46 | 10–6 (2–0) |
| Jan. 13 | Syracuse, NY | Syracuse | 66 | 79 | 10–7 (2–1) |
| Jan. 16 | Piscataway, NJ | Cincinnati | 44 | 33 | 11–7 (3–1) |
| Jan. 23 | Piscataway, NJ | Marquette | 75 | 64 | 12–7 (4–1) |
| Jan. 26 | Hartford, CT | Connecticut | 36 | 73 | 12–8 (4–2) |
| Jan. 30 | Washington, D.C. | Georgetown | 50 | 59 | 12–9 (4–3) |
| Feb. 1 | Piscataway, NJ | Notre Dame | 63 | 75 | 12–10 (4–4) |
| Feb. 6 | Tampa, FL | South Florida | 60 | 52 | 13–10 (5–4) |
| Feb. 10 | Piscataway, NJ | Seton Hall | 55 | 54 | 14–10 (6–4) |
| Feb. 13 | Villanova, PA | Villanova | 49 | 36 | 15–10 (7–4) |
| Feb. 16 | Morgantown, WV | West Virginia | 51 | 55 | 15–11 (7–5) |
| Feb. 21 | Piscataway, NJ | Syracuse | 45 | 76 | 15–12 (7–6) |
| Feb. 24 | Piscataway, NJ | St. John's | 52 | 60 | 15–13 (7–7) |
| Feb. 27 | Providence, RI | Providence | 67 | 56 | 16–13 (8–7) |
| Mar. 1 | Piscataway, NJ | Louisville | 72 | 52 | 17–13 (9–7) |

=== Paradise Jam tournament ===
| Date | Time | Visiting Team | Home Team | Score | Leading Scorer | Leading Rebounder |
|---|---|---|---|---|---|---|
| Nov. 26 | 7:00 PM | Southern California | Rutgers | Rutgers 66–51 | | |
| Nov. 27 | 7:00 PM | Rutgers | Mississippi State | Rutgers 62–54 | | |
| Nov. 28 | 9:30 PM | Texas | Rutgers | Texas 70–67 | | |

== Postseason ==
=== Big East tournament ===
| Date | Location | Opponent | Scarlet Knights points | Opp. points | Record |
|---|---|---|---|---|---|
| Mar. 6 | Hartford, CT | (14) Cincinnati (Second round) | 70 | 44 | 18–13 |
| Mar. 7 | Hartford, CT | (3) Georgetown (Quarterfinals) | 63 (2OT) | 56 | 19–13 |
| Mar. 8 | Hartford, CT | (2) West Virginia (Semifinals) | 49 | 56 | 19–14 |

=== NCAA basketball tournament ===
| Date | Location | Opponent | Scarlet Knights points | Opp. points | Record |
|---|---|---|---|---|---|
| Mar. 20 | Stanford, CA | (8) Iowa | 63 | 70 | 19–15 |

== See also ==
- 2009–10 NCAA Division I women's basketball season
