= 2009–10 Louisville Cardinals women's basketball team =

Intercollegiate basketball season

2009–10 Louisville Cardinals women's basketball

Caribbean Challenge co-champions

Women's Basketball Invitational, First Round
- Conference: Big East Conference (1979–2013)
- Record: 14-18 (5-11 Big East)
- Head coach: Jeff Walz
- Assistant coaches: Stephanie Norman; Michelle Clark-Heard; Bethann Shapiro Ord
- Home arena: Freedom Hall (Capacity: 18,865)

2009–10 Big East Conference women's basketball standings
	Conf.				Overall
Team	W		L	PCT	W		L	PCT
Connecticut	16	–	0	1.000	39	–	0	1.000
West Virginia	13	–	3	.813	29	–	6	.829
Georgetown	13	–	3	.813	26	–	7	.788
St. John's	12	–	4	.750	25	–	7	.781
Notre Dame	12	–	4	.750	29	–	6	.829
Rutgers	9	–	7	.563	19	–	15	.559
DePaul	9	–	7	.563	21	–	12	.636
Providence	7	–	9	.438	19	–	15	.559
Syracuse	7	–	9	.438	25	–	11	.694
Marquette	6	–	10	.375	17	–	16	.515
South Florida	6	–	10	.375	15	–	16	.484
Pittsburgh	5	–	11	.313	16	–	15	.516
Louisville	5	–	11	.313	14	–	18	.438
Cincinnati	4	–	12	.250	12	–	18	.400
Villanova	3	–	13	.188	14	–	16	.467
Seton Hall	1	–	15	.063	9	–	21	.300
† 2010 Big East tournament winner

The 2009–10 Louisville Cardinals women's basketball team represented the University of Louisville in the 2009–2010 NCAA Division I basketball season. The Cards, coached by Jeff Walz, played their final season at Freedom Hall at the Kentucky Exposition Center in Louisville, Kentucky, before moving into the KFC Yum! Center in Downtown Louisville for the 2010–11 season. The Cardinals were a member of the Big East Conference.

== Offseason ==
- April 21, 2009 : Freshman forward Gwen Rucker will play volleyball during the 2009 season while redshirting during the 2009–10 women's basketball season. Rucker was a starter for both the Louisville volleyball and women's basketball teams this past season, helping lead both to NCAA tournament play. Rucker saw action in 32 games for the Cardinals, starting in the final 27 games. She finished the year averaging three points and 2.1 rebounds per game.
- April 28, 2009: The University of Louisville women's basketball team will serve as Honorary Grand Marshals of the Pegasus Parade. The Cardinals advanced to the 2009 NCAA Championship game. The 54th annual Parade will begin at 5 p.m. on Thursday, April 30.
- April 29, 2009: BasketballScoop.com and ONS PerformanceTM announced that Louisville women's basketball assistant coach Stephanie Norman was named a finalist for their "Coaches of the Year" awards focusing on the "Rising Stars" of the college basketball coaching profession. The finalists were nominated by their peers, and were the 10 leading vote getters in our online voting. Norman joined Walz on the Louisville staff two years ago when he took over the program.
- May 5, 2009 : Freshman guards Mary Jackson and Tiera Stephen will not return to the University of Louisville women's basketball team for the 2009–10 season. Jackson and Stephen are currently exploring other options to continue their playing careers.

== Schedule ==
Date time, TV	Rank^{#}	Opponent^{#}	Result	Record	Site (attendance) city, state
Exhibition
November 1, 2009*; 2:00 p.m.		Northern Kentucky	W 79–54		Freedom Hall; Louisville, KY
Non-conference regular season
November 15, 2009*; 1:00 p.m.		at Dayton	W 65–63	1–0	UD Arena; Dayton, OH
November 17, 2009*; 7:00 p.m.		at Hartford	L 50–62	1–1	Chase Arena at Reich Family Pavilion (2,017); West Hartford, CT
November 22, 2009*; 4:30 p.m.		Tennessee Tech	W 84–54	2–1	Freedom Hall; Louisville, KY
November 27, 2009*; 6:00 p.m.		vs. Northern Iowa; Cancún Challenge	W 81–53	3–1	Hard Rock Hotel Riviera Maya; Cancun, Mexico
November 28, 2009*; 8:15 p.m.		vs. Old Dominion; Cancún Challenge	W 82–75	4–1	Hard Rock Hotel Riviera Maya; Cancun, Mexico
December 2, 2009*; 7:00 p.m.		at Central Michigan	L 75–84	4–2	McGuirk Arena; Mount Pleasant, MI
December 6, 2009*; 2:00 p.m.		Utah	W 60–55	5–2	Freedom Hall; Louisville, KY
December 9, 2009*; 7:00 p.m.		Middle Tennessee	L 84–94	5–3	Freedom Hall; Louisville, KY
December 13, 2009*; 2:00 p.m.		IUPUI	W 88–58	6–3	Freedom Hall; Louisville, KY
December 16, 2009*; 7:00 p.m.		at Tennessee	L 56–86	6–4	Thompson–Boling Arena (11,084); Knoxville, TN
December 20, 2009*; 1:00 p.m.		at Kentucky; Battle for the Bluegrass/Pack the House	L 67–101	6–5	Memorial Coliseum (7,323); Lexington, KY
December 22, 2009*; 7:00 p.m.		at New Hampshire	W 76–67	7–5	Lundholm Gym (763); Durham, NH
December 29, 2009*; 7:00 p.m.		IPFW	W 91–62	8–5	Freedom Hall; Louisville, KY
Big East regular season
January 2, 2010; 2:00 p.m.		at Cincinnati	W 63–49	9–5 (1–0)	Fifth Third Arena; Cincinnati, OH
January 5, 2010; 9:00 p.m.		at DePaul	L 70–76	9–6 (1–1)	McGrath Arena; Chicago, IL
January 9, 2010; 4:00 p.m.		Providence	W 67–48	10–6 (2–1)	Freedom Hall; Louisville, KY
January 16, 2010; 2:00 p.m.		at Georgetown	L 56–60	10–7 (2–2)	McDonough Gymnasium; Washington, D.C.
January 19, 2010; 7:00 p.m.		Notre Dame	L 60–78	10–8 (2–3)	Freedom Hall; Louisville, KY
January 23, 2010; 2:00 p.m.		Syracuse	L 58–64	10–9 (2–4)	Freedom Hall; Louisville, KY
January 26, 2010; 7:00 p.m.		Villanova	W 53–50	11–9 (3–4)	Freedom Hall; Louisville, KY
January 30, 2010; 7:00 p.m.		at No. 22 West Virginia	L 66–72	11–10 (3–5)	WVU Coliseum; Morgantown, WV
February 2, 2010; 7:00 p.m.		Cincinnati	L 68–74 ^{OT}	11–11 (3–6)	Freedom Hall; Louisville, KY
February 7, 2010; 12:00 p.m.		Connecticut	L 38–84	11–12 (3–7)	Freedom Hall; Louisville, KY
February 10, 2010; 2:00 p.m.		at St. John's	L 56–91	11–13 (3–8)	Carnesecca Arena; Queens, NY
February 14, 2010; 5:30 p.m, ESPN2		at Pittsburgh	L 69–72	11–14 (3–9)	Petersen Events Center; Pittsburgh, PA
February 16, 2010; 7:00 p.m.		Marquette	W 77–61	12–14 (4–9)	Freedom Hall; Louisville, KY
February 24, 2010; 7:00 p.m.		at Seton Hall	W 72–49	13–14 (5–9)	Walsh Gymnasium; South Orange, NJ
February 27, 2010; 2:00 p.m.		South Florida	L 60–63	13–15 (5–10)	Freedom Hall; Louisville, KY
March 1, 2010; 7:30 p.m.		at Rutgers	L 52–72	13–16 (5–11)	Louis Brown Athletic Center; Piscataway, NJ
Big East Women's Tournament
March 5, 2010*; 12:00 p.m.	(13)	vs. (12) Pittsburgh; First round	W 79–71	14–16	XL Center; Hartford, CT
March 6, 2010*; 12:00 p.m.	(13)	vs. (5) Notre Dame; Second round	L 52–89	14–17	XL Center; Hartford, CT
WBI Tournament
March 17, 2010*; 7:00 p.m.	(3)	(6) Bradley; First round	L 59–69	14–18	Freedom Hall; Louisville, KY
*Non-conference game. ^{#}Rankings from AP Poll. (#) Tournament seedings in parentheses. W=West. All times are in Eastern Time.

== See also ==
- 2009–10 NCAA Division I women's basketball season
- 2009–10 Louisville Cardinals men's basketball team
- Kentucky–Louisville rivalry
