= 2009–10 Notre Dame Fighting Irish women's basketball team =

Intercollegiate basketball season

2009–10 Notre Dame Fighting Irish women's basketball
- Conference: Big East Conference (1979–2013)|Big East
- Head coach: Muffet McGraw
- Assistant coach: Angie Barber
- Home arena: Edmund P. Joyce Center

2009–10 Big East Conference women's basketball standings
| | Conf. | | | | Overall |
| Team | W | | L | PCT | W | | L | PCT |
|---|---|---|---|---|---|---|---|---|
| Connecticut | 16 | – | 0 | 1.000 | 39 | – | 0 | 1.000 |
| West Virginia | 13 | – | 3 | .813 | 29 | – | 6 | .829 |
| Georgetown | 13 | – | 3 | .813 | 26 | – | 7 | .788 |
| St. John's | 12 | – | 4 | .750 | 25 | – | 7 | .781 |
| Notre Dame | 12 | – | 4 | .750 | 29 | – | 6 | .829 |
| Rutgers | 9 | – | 7 | .563 | 19 | – | 15 | .559 |
| DePaul | 9 | – | 7 | .563 | 21 | – | 12 | .636 |
| Providence | 7 | – | 9 | .438 | 19 | – | 15 | .559 |
| Syracuse | 7 | – | 9 | .438 | 25 | – | 11 | .694 |
| Marquette | 6 | – | 10 | .375 | 17 | – | 16 | .515 |
| South Florida | 6 | – | 10 | .375 | 15 | – | 16 | .484 |
| Pittsburgh | 5 | – | 11 | .313 | 16 | – | 15 | .516 |
| Louisville | 5 | – | 11 | .313 | 14 | – | 18 | .438 |
| Cincinnati | 4 | – | 12 | .250 | 12 | – | 18 | .400 |
| Villanova | 3 | – | 13 | .188 | 14 | – | 16 | .467 |
| Seton Hall | 1 | – | 15 | .063 | 9 | – | 21 | .300 |
† 2010 Big East tournament winner

The 2009–10 Notre Dame Fighting Irish women's basketball team represented the University of Notre Dame in the 2009–10 NCAA Division I women's basketball season.

== Offseason ==
- May 4: The Irish will participate in the 2009 US Virgin Islands Paradise Jam at University of Virgin Islands. The event is celebrating its tenth anniversary. Games will be played at the U.V.I. Sports and Fitness Center, the Caribbean's premier basketball facility located in Charlotte Amalie, St. Thomas.
- May 14: Senior guard Lindsay Schrader (Bartlett, Ill./Bartlett) scored a team-high 15 points to lead four Notre Dame players in double figures. The Irish picked up its second victory in as many games on its European tour with a wire-to-wire 78–68 win over GEAS Sesto San Giovanni at the Sesto San Giovanni Municipal Gymnasium outside of Milan, Italy. Schrader also collected eight rebounds and four steals, while shooting 7-of-12 from the floor. Sophomore guard Natalie Novosel had 13 points, five rebounds and five steals, while senior guard Ashley Barlow and junior forward Becca Bruszewski added 12 points apiece for Notre Dame.
- May 18, 2009: Fighting Irish incoming freshman Skylar Diggins has been selected as one of 14 finalists for the 2009 USA Basketball U19 World Championship Team. The choices were made from a field of 27 players ages 19-and-under (born on or after Jan. 1, 1990) that competed in three days of trials in Colorado Springs, Colo., at the U.S. Olympic Training Center.
- August 18: On January. 16, Notre Dame and Connecticut will be part of the first-ever ESPN women's basketball College GameDay broadcast. The game will be broadcast from Gampel Pavilion in Storrs, Conn. The matchup between the Fighting Irish and Huskies will tip off at 9 p.m. (ET) and will be televised live to a national cable audience by ESPN.

== Preseason ==
- Paradise Jam

| Date | Time | Visiting team | Home team | Score | Leading Scorer | Leading Rebounder |
|---|---|---|---|---|---|---|
| Nov. 26 | 4:30 PM | San Diego State | Notre Dame | | | |
| Nov. 27 | 2:00 PM | Notre Dame | South Carolina | | | |
| Nov. 28 | 4:30 PM | Oklahoma | Notre Dame | | | |

== Regular season ==
=== Roster ===
| Number | Name | Height | Position | Class |
|---|---|---|---|---|
| 1 | Erica Solomon | 6-2 | Forward | Soph. |
| 4 | Skylar Diggins | 5-9 | Guard | Freshman |
| 12 | Fraderica Miller | 5-10 | Guard | Soph. |
| 14 | Devereaux Peters | 6-2 | Forward | Junior |
| 15 | Kaila Turner | 5-8 | Guard | Freshman |
| 20 | Ashley Barlow | 5-9 | Guard | Senior |
| 21 | Natalie Novosel | 5-11 | Guard | Soph. |
| 22 | Brittany Mallory | 5-10 | Guard | Junior |
| 23 | Melissa Lechlitner | 5-7 | Guard | Senior |
| 24 | Lindsay Schrader | 6-0 | Guard | Senior |
| 32 | Becca Bruszewski | 6-1 | Forward | Senior |
| 44 | Alena Christiansen | 5-7 | Guard | Senior |
| 52 | Erica Williamson | 6-4 | Center | Senior |

=== Schedule ===
| Date | Location | Opponent | Irish points | Opp. points | Record |
|---|---|---|---|---|---|
| 11-3-09 | HOME | Indianapolis (Exhibition) | 97 | 53 | 0–0 |
| 11-15-09 | HOME | Arkansas Pine-Bluff | 102 | 57 | 1–0 |
| 11-19-09 | AWAY | Michigan State | 68 | 67 | 2–0 |
| 11-22-09 | HOME | Iona | 80 | 45 | 3–0 |
| 11-26-09 | Paradise Jam (US Virgin Islands) | San Diego State | 84 | 79 | 4–0 |
| 11-27-09 | Paradise Jam (US Virgin Islands) | South Carolina | 78 | 55 | 5–0 |
| 11-28-09 | Paradise Jam (US Virgin Islands) | Oklahoma | 81 | 71 | 6–0 |
| 12-2-09 | HOME | Eastern Michigan | 69 | 59 | 7–0 |
| 12-8-09 | HOME | IPFW | 96 | 60 | 8–0 |
| 12-12-09 | HOME | Valpraiso | 88 | 47 | 9–0 |
| 12-20-09 | HOME | Charlotte | 90 | 30 | 10–0 |
| 12-29-09 | AWAY | Central Florida | 85 | 52 | 11–0 |
| 12-31-09 | HOME | Vanderbilt | 74 | 69 | 12–0 |
| 1-4-10 | AWAY | Purdue | 79 | 75 | 13–0 |
| 1-9-10 | HOME | Villanova | 81 | 46 | 14–0 |
| 1-12-10 | HOME | South Florida | 81 | 64 | 15–0 |
| 1-16-10 | AWAY | Connecticut | 46 | 70 | 15–1 |
| 1-19-10 | AWAY | Louisville | 78 | 60 | 16–1 |
| 1-24-10 | HOME | West Virginia | 74 | 66 | 17–1 |
| 1-27-10 | HOME | Providence | 84 | 59 | 18–1 |
| 1-30-10 | AWAY | Syracuse | 74 | 73 | 19–1 |
| 2-1-10 | AWAY | Rutgers | 75 | 63 | 20–1 |
| 2-6-10 | HOME | Pittsburgh | 86 | 76 | 21–1 |
| 2-9-10 | AWAY | Cincinnati | 66 | 50 | 22–1 |
| 2-14-10 | HOME | Depaul | 90 | 66 | 23–1 |
| 2-16-10 | AWAY | St. John's | 71 | 76 | 23–2 |
| 2-20-10 | AWAY | Georgetown | 66 | 76 | 23–3 |
| 2-23-10 | HOME | Marquette | 82 | 67 | 24–3 |
| 2-27-10 | AWAY | Seton Hall | 72 | 47 | 25–3 |
| 3-1-10 | HOME | Connecticut | 51 | 76 | 25–4 |
| 3-6-10 | Conf. Tourn. First Round (Hartford, CT) | Louisville | 89 | 52 | 26–4 |
| 3-7-10 | Conf. Tourn. Second Round (Hartford, CT) | St. John's | 72 | 67 | 27–4 |
| 3-8-10 | Conf. Tourn. Semi-Finals (Hartford, CT) | Connecticut | 44 | 59 | 27–5 |
| 3-21-10 | NCAA Tournament First Round (South Bend, IN) | Cleveland State | 86 | 58 | 28–5 |
| 3-23-10 | NCAA Tournament First Round (South Bend, IN) | Vermont | 84 | 66 | 29–5 |
