= Agnus Berenato =

American basketball coach (born 1956)

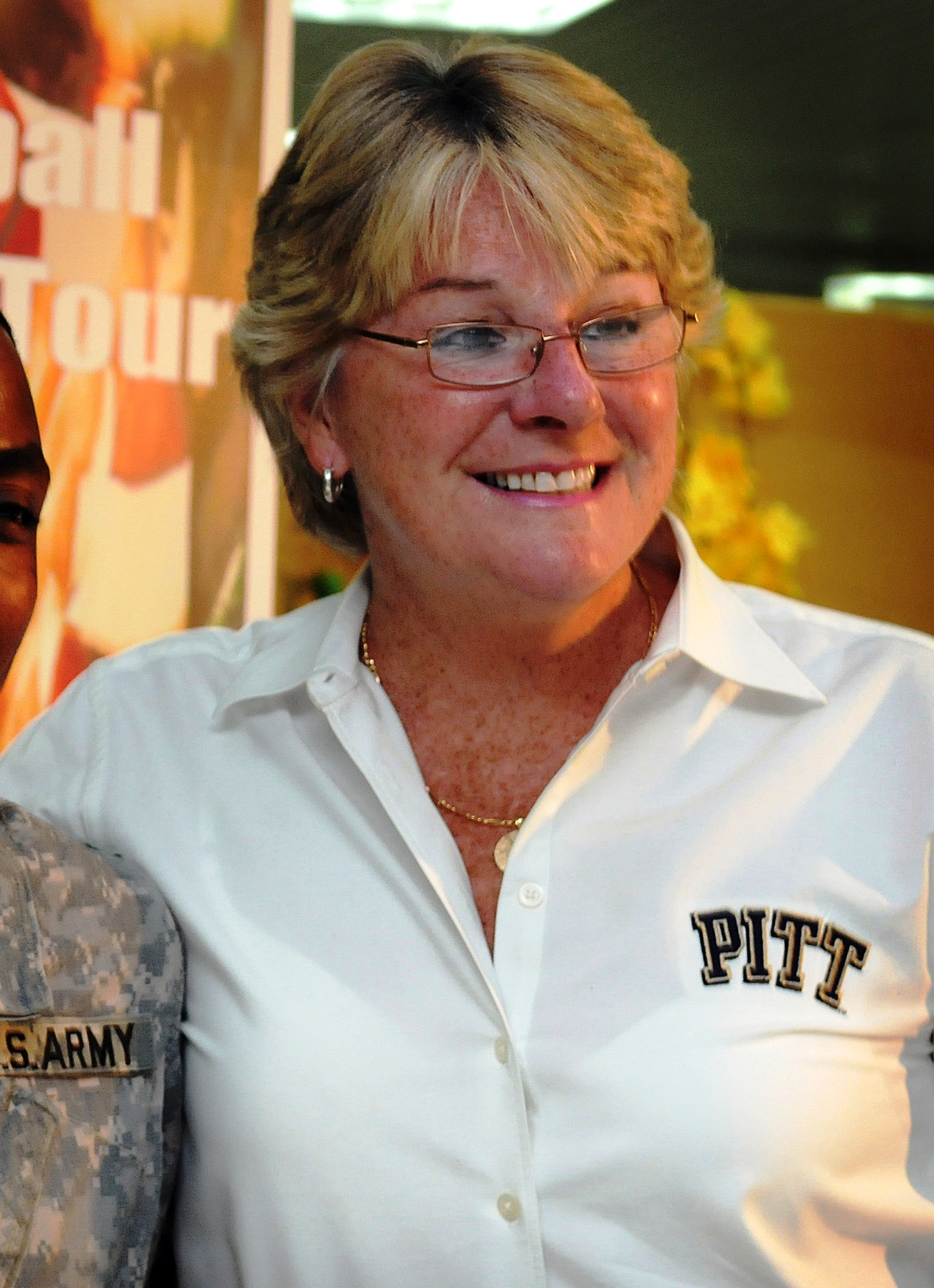
- Berenato in 2009

Biographical details
- Born: December 9, 1956 (age 69); Gloucester City, New Jersey, U.S.

Playing career
- 1977: North Carolina
- 1978-1980: Mount St. Mary's University

Coaching career (HC unless noted)
- 1981: Holy Cross HS
- 1982–1985: Rider
- 1987–1988: Georgia Tech (assistant)
- 1989–2003: Georgia Tech
- 2003–2013: Pittsburgh
- 2016–2021: Kennesaw State

Head coaching record
- Overall: 454–433 (.512)

Agnus Berenato (born Agnus McGlade on December 9, 1956), is an American former basketball coach. She was the head women's basketball coach at Rider from 1982 to 1985, Georgia Tech from 1989 to 2003, Pittsburgh from 2003 to 2013, and Kennesaw State from 2016 to 2021. She is the all-time wins leader among women's basketball head coaches at the University of Pittsburgh.

== Early life and education ==
Berenato is the eighth of ten children born to Peter and Theresa McGlade. Raised in Gloucester City, New Jersey, she attended Gloucester Catholic High School, where she played on three state championship teams. Berenato is the elder sister of former Georgia Tech Head Coach and Atlantic 10 Conference Commissioner Bernadette McGlade.

== Coach ==
=== Rider University ===
From 1982 to 1985, she served as the head women's basketball coach at Rider. During her time at Rider, she also coached Rider's women's volleyball team posting a 66–51 record in four seasons.

She has also been elected into the Camden County, Rider University, and Mount Saint Mary's University Sports Hall of Fames.

=== Georgia Tech ===
Prior to coming to Pittsburgh, she served as the head women's basketball coach for the Georgia Tech Yellow Jackets from 1989 to 2003, where she compiled a 223–209 record with appearances in the 1993 and 2003 NCAA Tournaments.

=== University of Pittsburgh ===
During her tenure at the University of Pittsburgh, the Panthers women's basketball enjoyed the most successful era in its history to date. She led Pitt to a WNIT final four in 2005 and the school's first women's NCAA tournament appearance in 2006. The Panthers concluded the season at 24–9, including a first round win over James Madison.

During the 2007 season, Berenato led the Pitt women to its first win over an opponent ranked in the top 10, first Sweet Sixteen appearance, and first final ranking in the ESPN/USA Today coaches poll (#16). Success continued in 2009 as she led the Panthers to their second straight Sweet 16 appearance and broke a school record for victories. In 2010, she led Pitt to its fifth straight post-season appearance, a first round loss in the WNIT. With her 159th win at Pitt on December 20, 2012, Berenato broke the all-time record for wins among women's basketball head coaches at the university. However, following back-to-back winless seasons in the Big East Conference in 2012 and 2013, the university announced on April 1, 2013, that she would not return to coach at the university. Berenato finished with a 161-149 (.519) record in 10 seasons at Pitt.

While at Pitt, Berenato was a two time Dapper Dan Sportswomen of the Year, winning the honor in 2005 and 2007.

=== Sports Diplomacy ===
In 2017, Berenato traveled to Guyana and Suriname as a Sports Envoy for the U.S. State Department's Sports Diplomacy Office. During her visit, she conducted basketball clinics and programming related to youth empowerment. In so doing, Berenato helped contribute to Sports Diplomacy's mission to build understanding, awareness, and skills for youth from under-served communities.
