= 2009–10 Michigan Wolverines men's basketball team =

American college basketball season

2009–10 Michigan Wolverines men's basketball

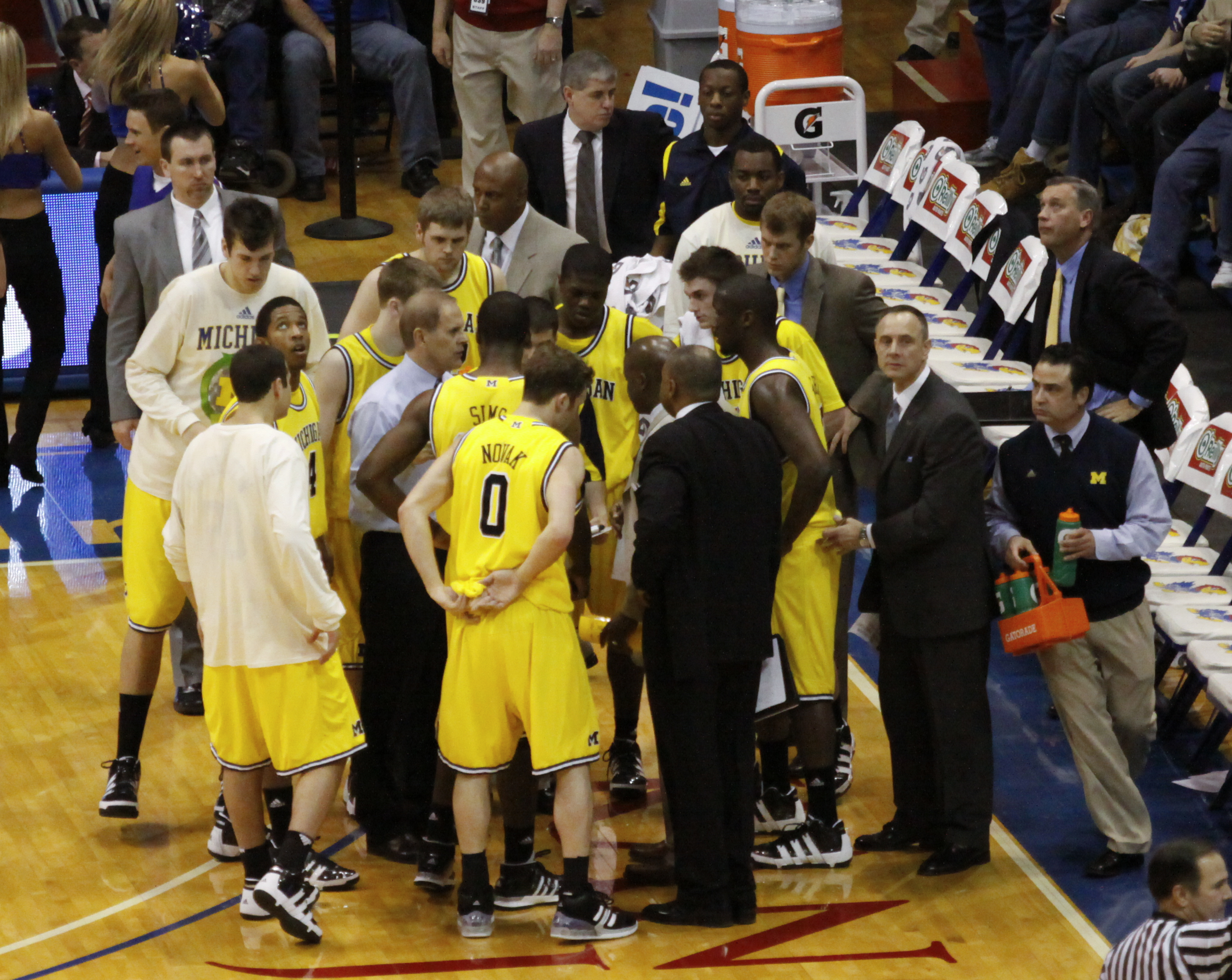
- Conference: Big Ten Conference
- Record: 15–17 (7–11 Big Ten)
- Head coach: John Beilein (3rd season)
- Assistant coaches: Jerry Dunn (Jeff Meyer interim replacement); Mike Jackson; John Mahoney
- MVPs: Manny Harris; DeShawn Sims
- Captains: Manny Harris; DeShawn Sims; Zack Novak
- Home arena: Crisler Arena

2009–10 Big Ten Conference men's basketball standings
	Conf.				Overall
Team	W		L	PCT	W		L	PCT
No. 5 Ohio State†	14	–	4	.778	29	–	8	.784
No. 10 Purdue	14	–	4	.778	29	–	6	.829
No. 13 Michigan State	14	–	4	.778	28	–	9	.757
No. 16 Wisconsin	13	–	5	.722	24	–	9	.727
Illinois	10	–	8	.556	21	–	15	.583
Minnesota	9	–	9	.500	21	–	14	.600
Northwestern	7	–	11	.389	20	–	14	.588
Michigan	7	–	11	.389	15	–	17	.469
Indiana	4	–	14	.222	10	–	21	.323
Iowa	4	–	14	.222	10	–	22	.313
Penn State	3	–	15	.167	11	–	20	.355
† 2010 Big Ten tournament winner As of April 3, 2010; Rankings from AP Poll

The 2009–10 Michigan Wolverines men's basketball team represented the University of Michigan during the 2009-10 NCAA Division I men's basketball season. The team was coached by John Beilein and played its home games in Ann Arbor, Michigan at the Crisler Arena, which has a capacity of 13,751, for the forty-third consecutive year. This season marked the team's ninety-third consecutive year as a member of the Big Ten Conference. The team finished the season with a 15–17 overall record and a 7–11 conference record, which was tied for seventh in the conference standings. It was seeded eighth in the single-elimination 2010 Big Ten Conference men's basketball tournament where it advanced one round. On October 16, Michigan was one of five Big Ten schools to begin its season by celebrating Midnight Madness.

Following the University of Michigan basketball scandal, the team had completed serving a scholarship probation imposed in 2003 two years earlier. During the probation, the team had had only twelve scholarships to offer instead of the usual thirteen. However, Michigan continued to be prohibited from affiliation with implicated athletes (Chris Webber, Robert Traylor, Maurice Taylor, and Louis Bullock) until 2012, which meant, among other things, that the players could not help the university recruit. The team was expected to finish between third and fifth in the conference by most expert pollings. The team was led by a pair of Wooden Award preseason watchlist nominees: Manny Harris and DeShawn Sims. Harris, Sims and Zack Novak served as team captains.

The team won two of its first three games against ranked opponents (Connecticut and Ohio State). However, the season was a disappointment that included two buzzer-beater losses to conference co-champions Ohio State and Michigan State on field goals by 2010 Big Ten Conference Men's Basketball Player of the Year Evan Turner and 2009 Big Ten Conference Men's Basketball Player of the Year Kalin Lucas. After starting the season 3–0, the team never again won three games in a row. The team was nationally ranked to start the season, but never reappeared in the national polls after the third week of the season. Michigan ended the year with a 7–11 conference record (tied for seventh) and a 15–17 overall regular season record. Turner's buzzer-beater came in the second round of the 2010 Big Ten Conference men's basketball tournament in which the eighth-seeded Wolverines lost by a point to the top-seeded Buckeyes.

At the conclusion of the regular season, Sims and Harris were named to the 2nd and 3rd All-Big Ten teams, respectively, by both conference coaches and the media. Following the Big Ten tournament both players were recognized as 2nd-team All-District selections by the National Association of Basketball Coaches.

== Preview ==
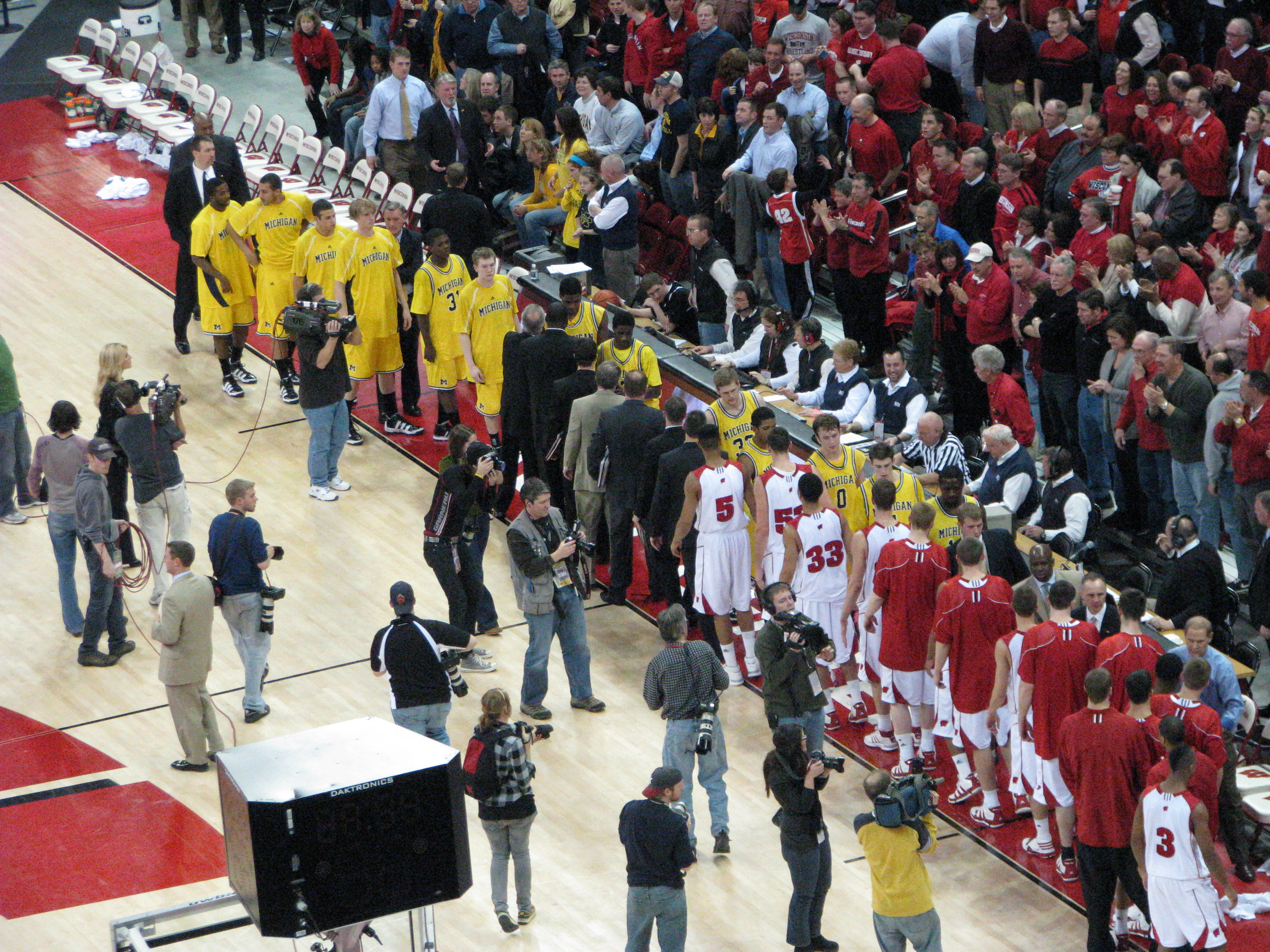
Wolverines shake hands with Wisconsin after a 54–48 loss in Madison, WI. (2010-01-20)

November 12, 2008, marked the first day of the early signing period for high school seniors wishing to become eligible student-athletes in the 2009–2010 academic year. The early period ended on November 19, 2008, for NCAA college basketball teams (the regular signing period is from April 15 – May 20, 2009). However, verbal commitments are usually accurate predictors of signing activity. Based on verbals and very early signings, Big Ten Conference rivals Indiana, Minnesota and Illinois had top 25 signing classes, but Michigan did not according to both ESPN and Scout.com. The team was the choice of four blue chip prospects who followed through on their verbal commitments and signed letters of intent including Matt Vogrich and Darius Morris. The 6 ft 4 in (1.93 m) 180-pound (82 kg) Morris was listed among the top 15 point guards in the nation by Scout.com, Rivals.com and ESPN. Kelvin Grady, who had played 64 games and made 33 starts during his first two seasons, was going to transfer from the program at the end of the prior season, but he became a wide receiver on the 2009 Michigan Wolverines football team. In June 2009, Jordan Morgan had surgery on his left knee to repair articular cartilage. The expected recovery time was four to five months. In October, it was unclear whether he would be able to join the team or whether he would redshirt.

Entering the season, Harris was regarded by some as the most highly rated player in the Big Ten. E.g., the FOX Sports preseason All-American listed him on its second team. It included Michigan State's Kalin Lucas on its third team, Purdue's Robbie Hummel on its fourth team and Ohio State's Evan Turner on its fifth team. However, ESPN chose both Lucas and Turner to its preseason second-team All-American list, while Harris was not shown on a single ballot. Harris and Sims were named among the 50 preseason Wooden Award watch list nominees. Harris was also named to the preseason Naismith College Player of the Year watchlist. The 24-member Big Ten media panel selected Harris as a first team preseason All-Big Ten team member.

The 2009–10 schedule includes the Old Spice Classic, an ACC – Big Ten Challenge match against Boston College, games against preseason ranked power conference opponents Kansas and Connecticut as well as the 2010 Big Ten Conference men's basketball tournament.

== Roster ==
The 2009-10 Michigan Wolverine Leaders
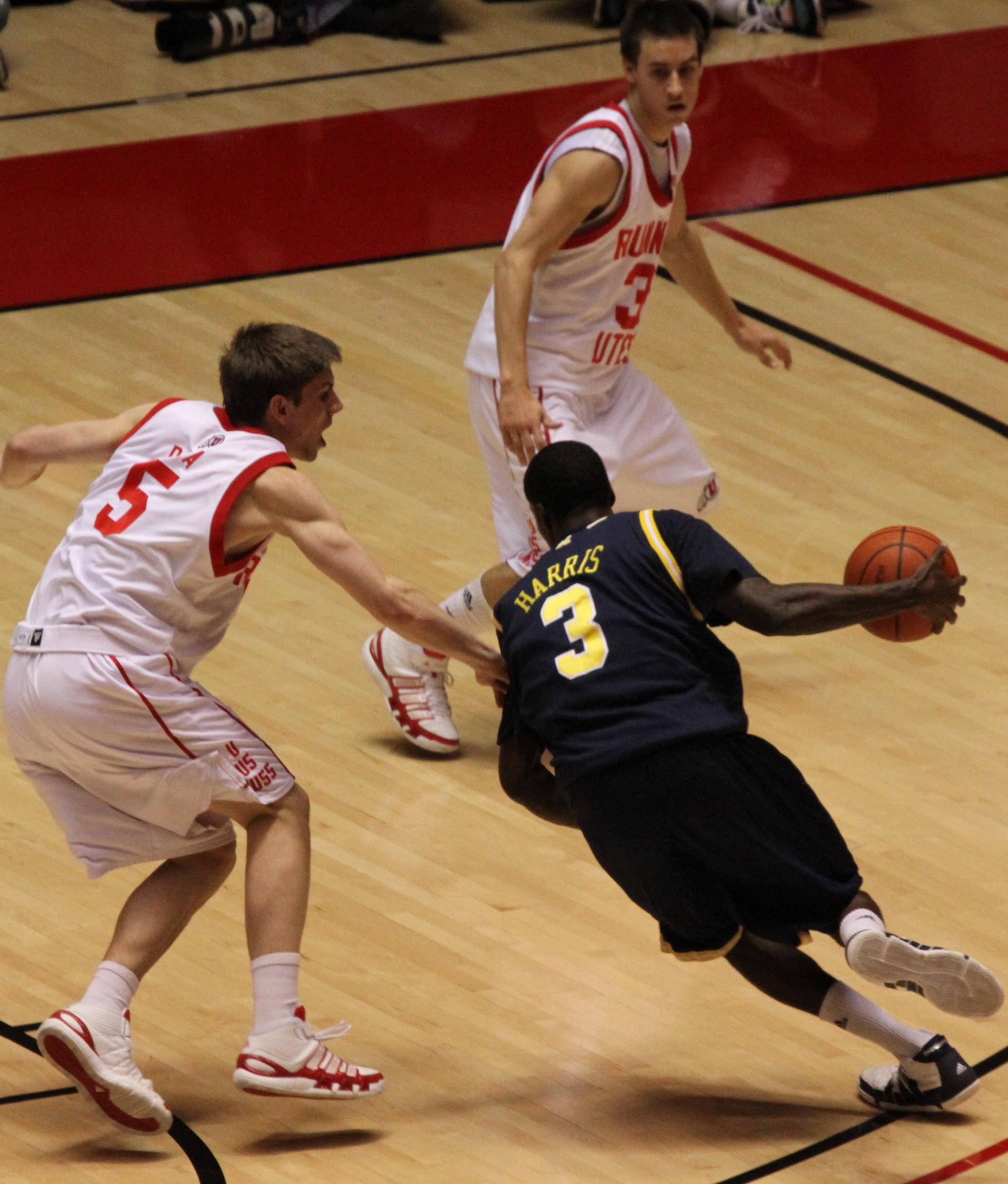
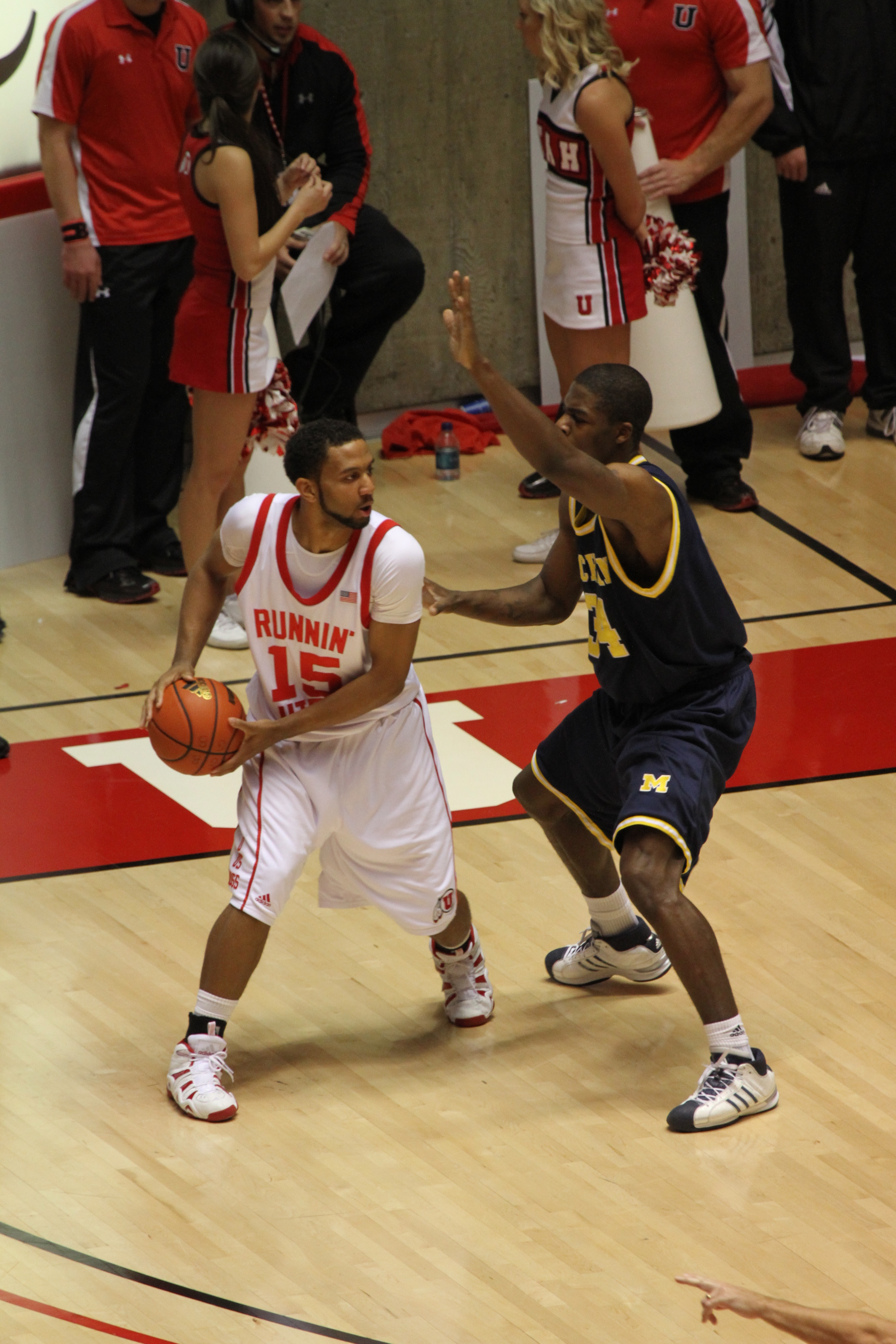
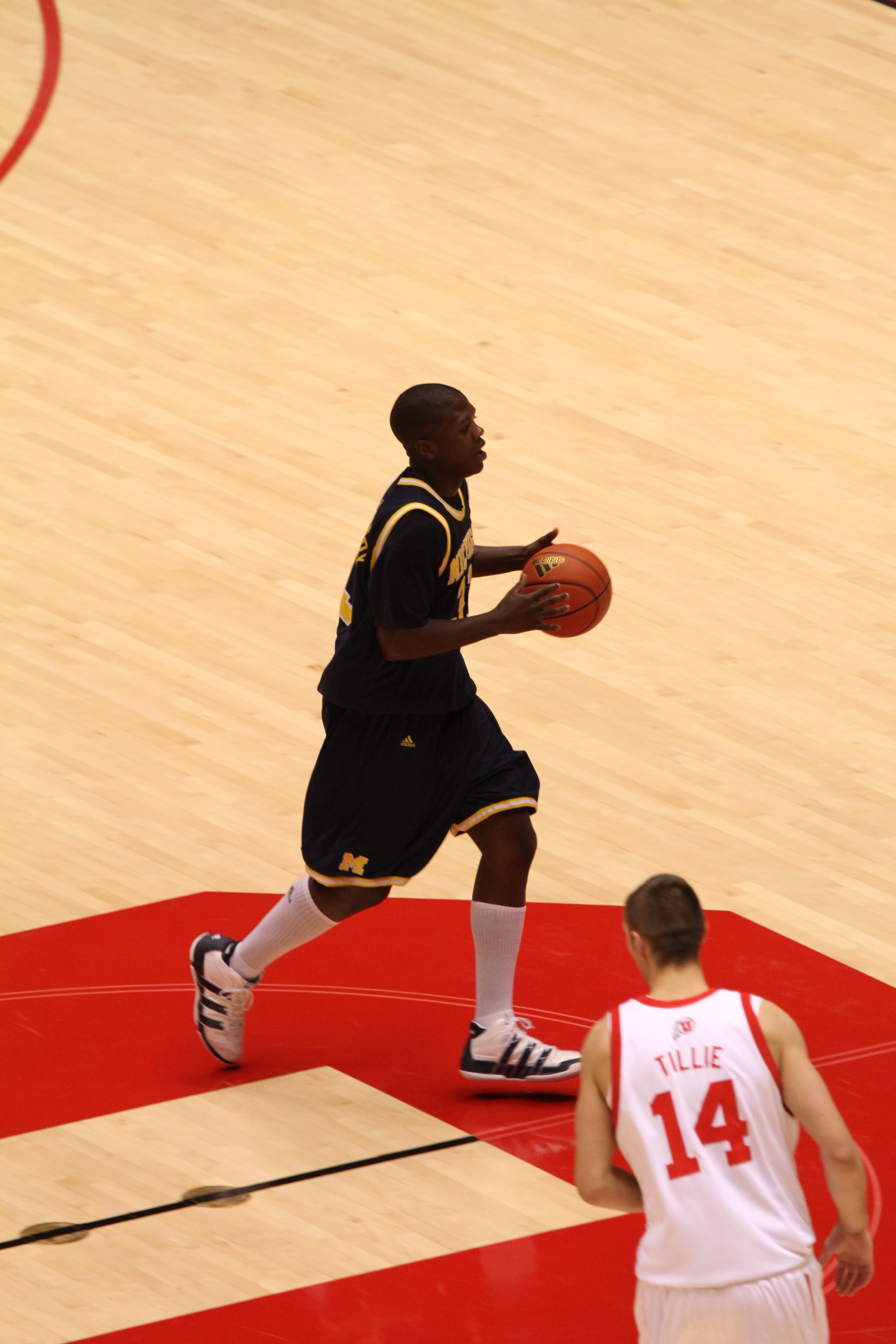
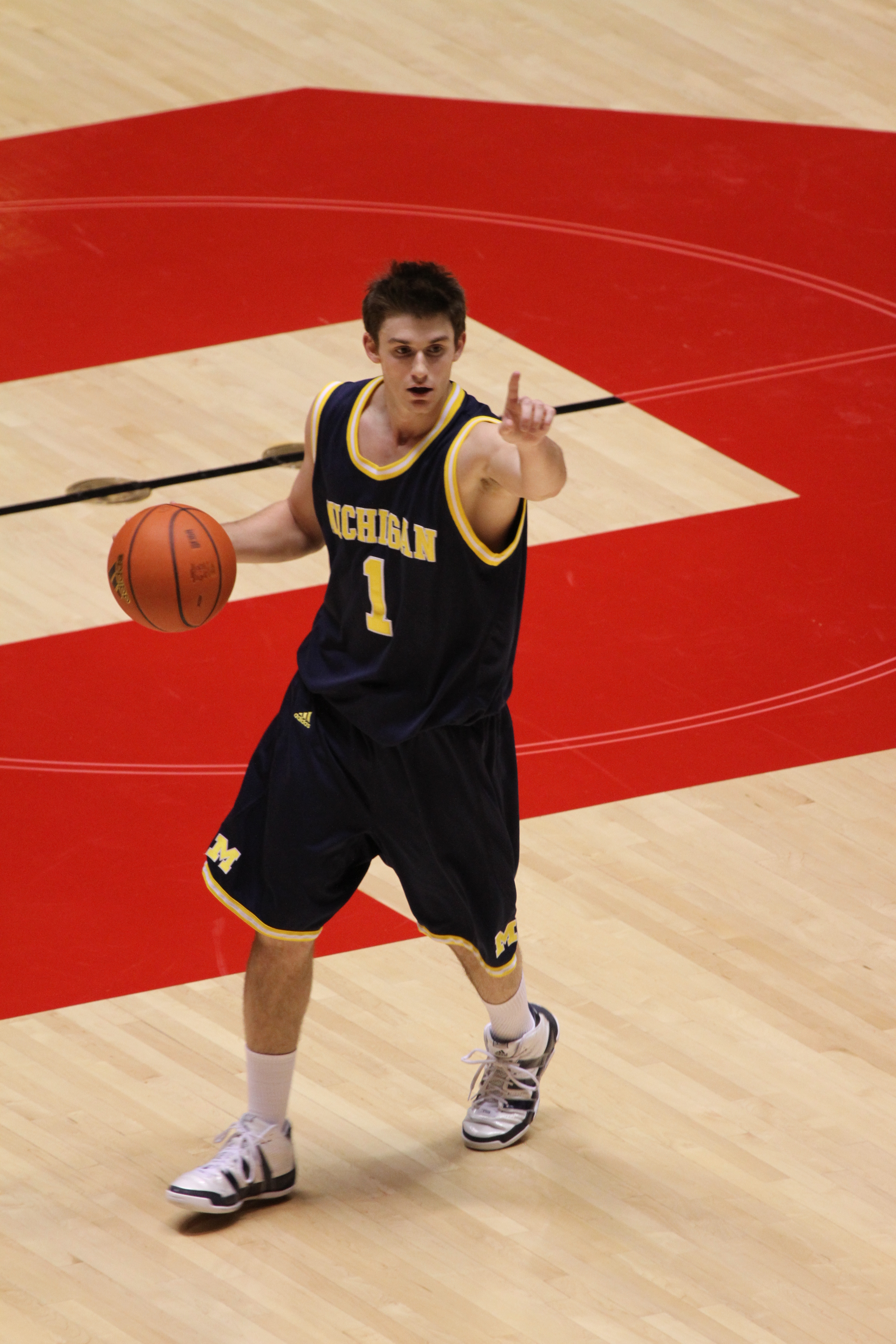
Left to right: Harris, Sims, Lucas-Perry, Douglass vs. Utah (September 12, 2009)

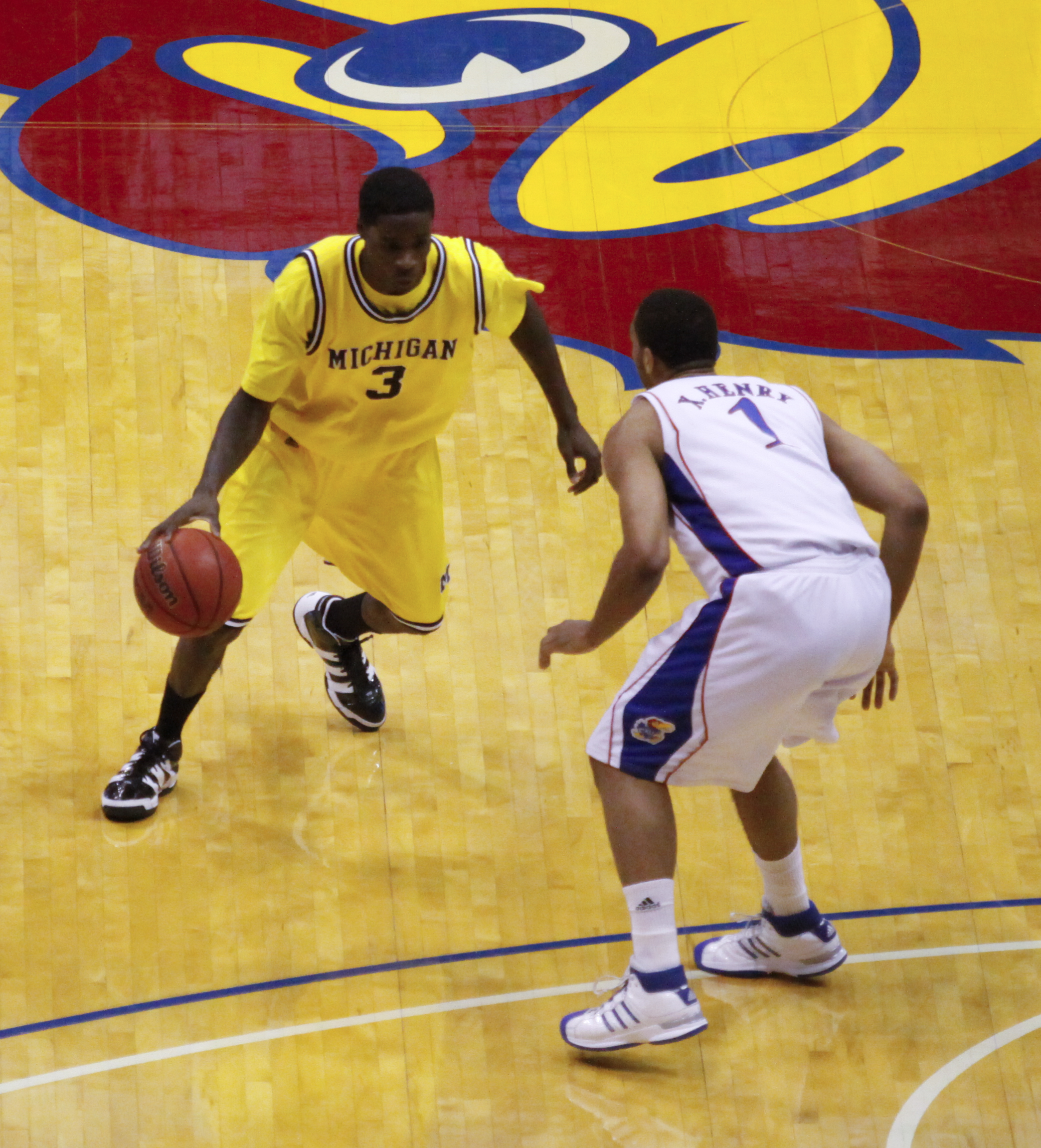
Manny Harris is guarded by Xavier Henry

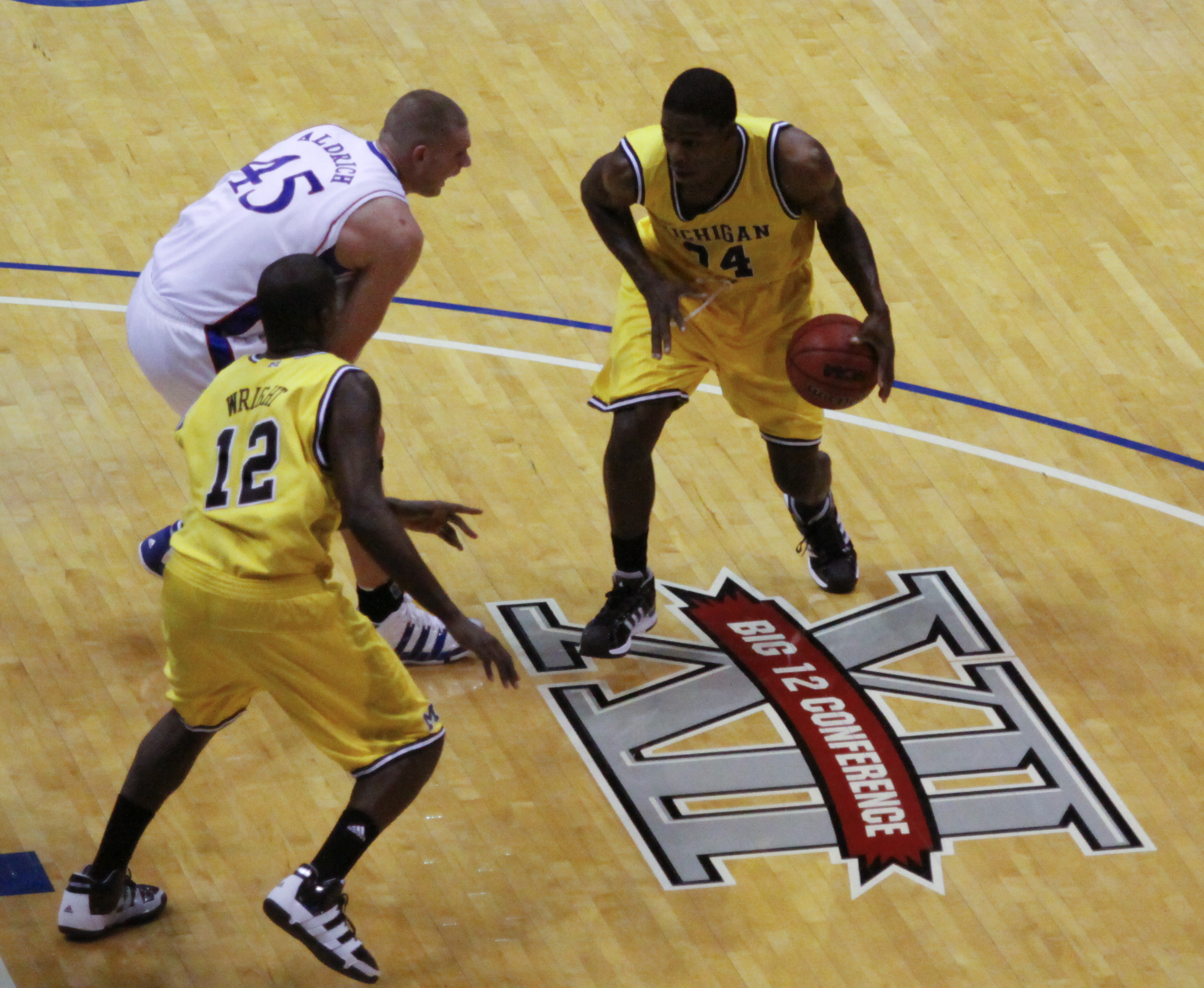
DeShawn Sims attacks Cole Aldrich

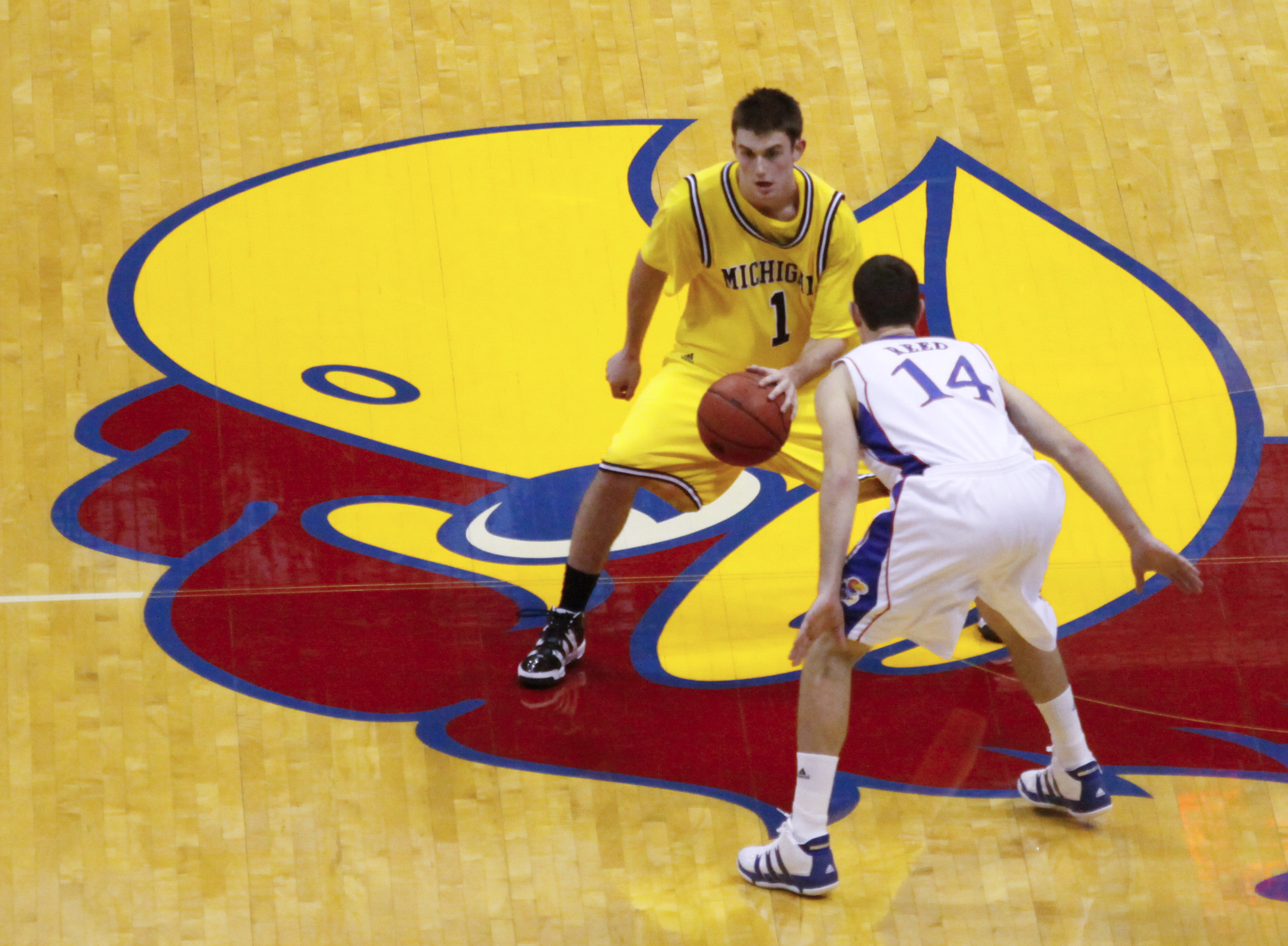
Douglass

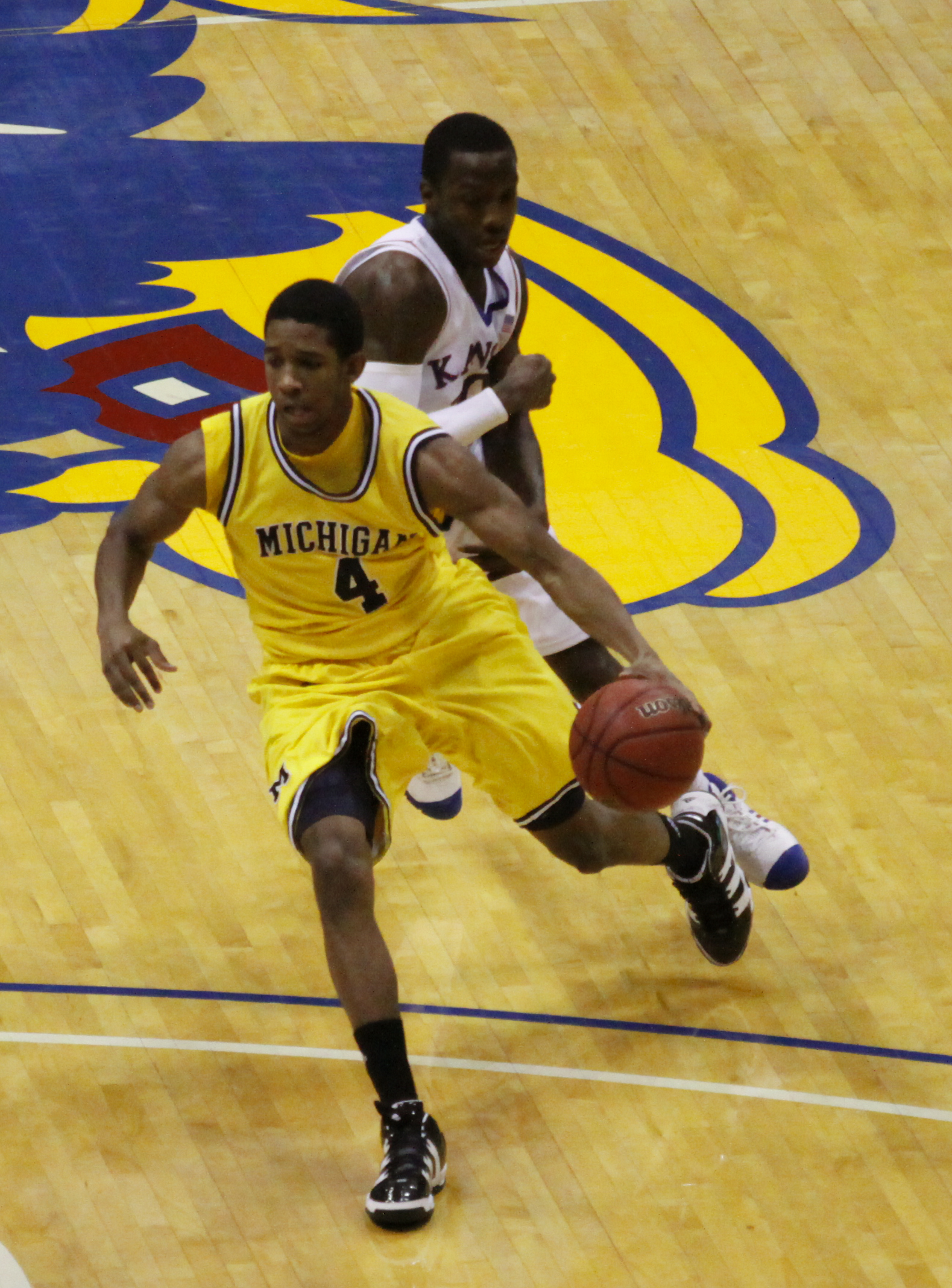
Darius Morris

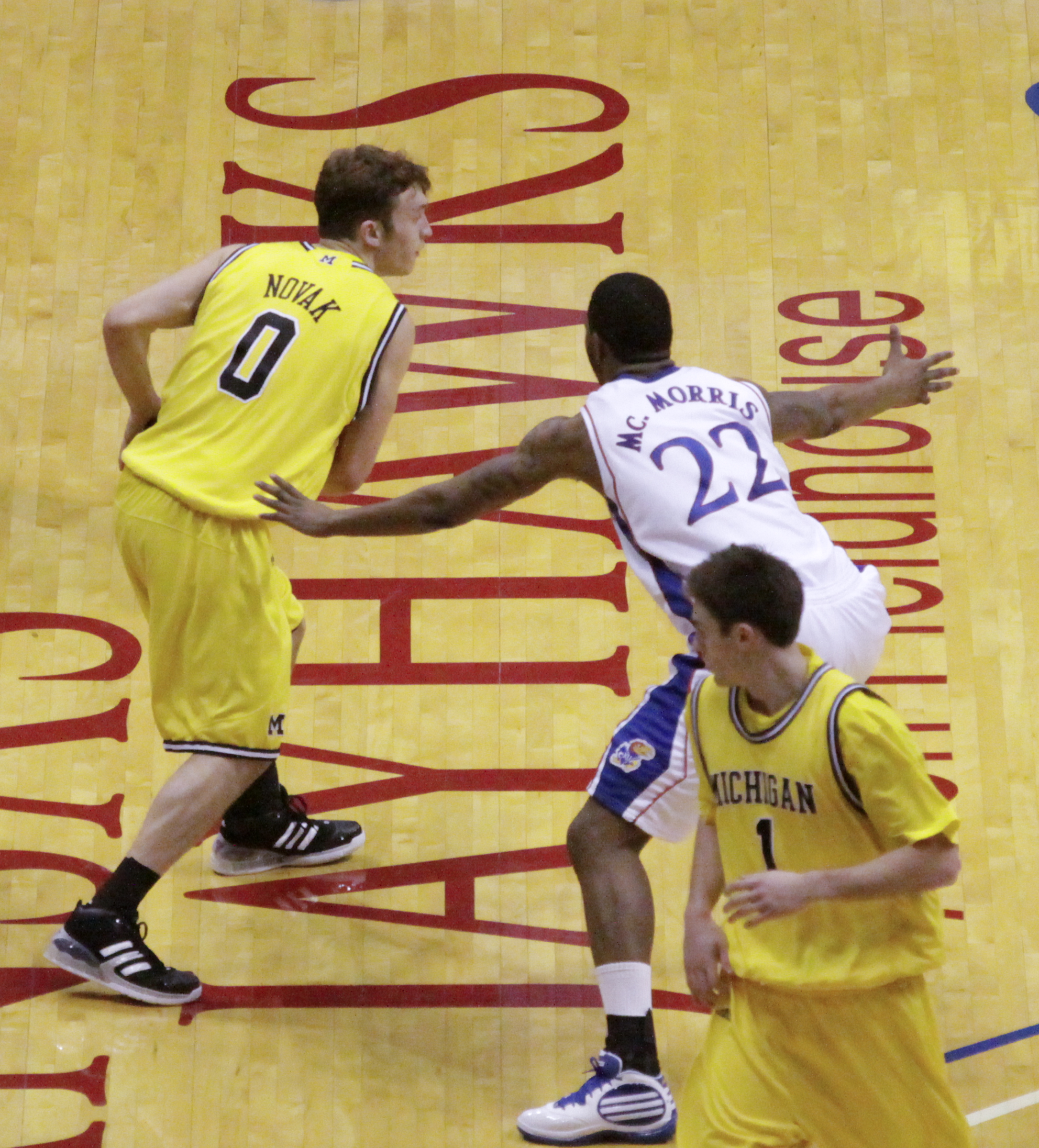
Zack Novak

#	Name	Height	Weight	Position	Class	Hometown		Previous Team(s)
0	Zack Novak	6 ft 5 in (1.96 m)	210 pounds (95 kg)	G	So.	Chesterton, Indiana	U.S.	Chesterton HS
1	Stu Douglass	6 ft 3 in (1.91 m)	175 pounds (79 kg)	G	So.	Carmel, Indiana	U.S.	Carmel HS
3	Manny Harris	6 ft 5 in (1.96 m)	185 pounds (84 kg)	G	Jr.	Detroit, Michigan	U.S.	Redford HS
4	Darius Morris	6 ft 4 in (1.93 m)	180 pounds (82 kg)	G	Fr.	Los Angeles, California	U.S.	Windward HS
5	Eso Akunne	6 ft 3 in (1.91 m)	220 pounds (100 kg)	G	Fr.	Ann Arbor, Michigan	U.S.	Gabriel Richard HS
12	Anthony Wright	6 ft 6 in (1.98 m)	235 pounds (107 kg)	F	Jr.	Sterling, Virginia	U.S.	Oak Hill Academy
13	Matt Vogrich	6 ft 4 in (1.93 m)	180 pounds (82 kg)	G	Fr.	Lake Forest, Illinois	U.S.	Lake Forest HS
20	Josh Bartelstein	6 ft 3 in (1.91 m)	190 pounds (86 kg)	G	Fr.	Highland Park, Illinois	U.S.	Highland Park HS/Phillips Exeter
22	Blake McLimans	6 ft 10 in (2.08 m)	220 pounds (100 kg)	F	Fr.	Hamburg, New York	U.S.	Worcester Academy
23	Corey Person	6 ft 4 in (1.93 m)	200 pounds (91 kg)	G	So.	Kalamazoo, Michigan	U.S.	Kalamazoo Central HS
30	Eric Puls	6 ft 10 in (2.08 m)	210 pounds (95 kg)	C	So.	Alpena, Michigan	U.S.	Alpena HS
31	Laval Lucas-Perry	6 ft 3 in (1.91 m)	185 pounds (84 kg)	G	So.	Flint, Michigan	U.S.	University of Arizona
32	Zack Gibson	6 ft 10 in (2.08 m)	220 pounds (100 kg)	F	Sr.	Grand Blanc, Michigan	U.S.	Rutgers University
34	DeShawn Sims	6 ft 8 in (2.03 m)	235 pounds (107 kg)	F	Sr.	Detroit, Michigan	U.S.	Pershing HS
35	Ben Cronin	7 ft 0 in (2.13 m)	265 pounds (120 kg)	C	Fr.	Syracuse, New York	U.S.	Henninger HS
52	Jordan Morgan	6 ft 8 in (2.03 m)	240 pounds (110 kg)	F	Fr.	Detroit, Michigan	U.S.	Detroit Jesuit

- denotes class status adjusted for used redshirt eligibility.

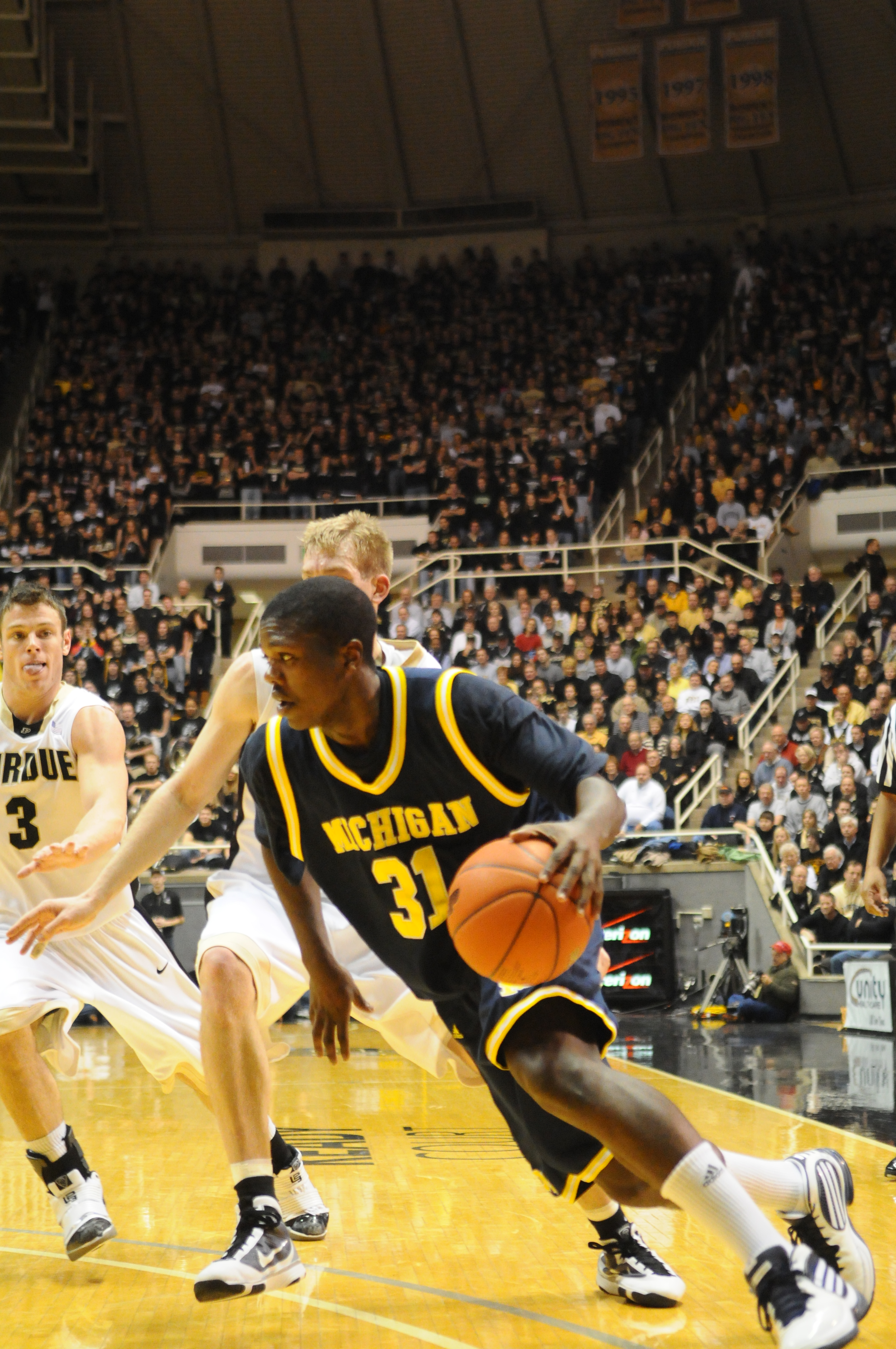
Laval Lucas-Perry

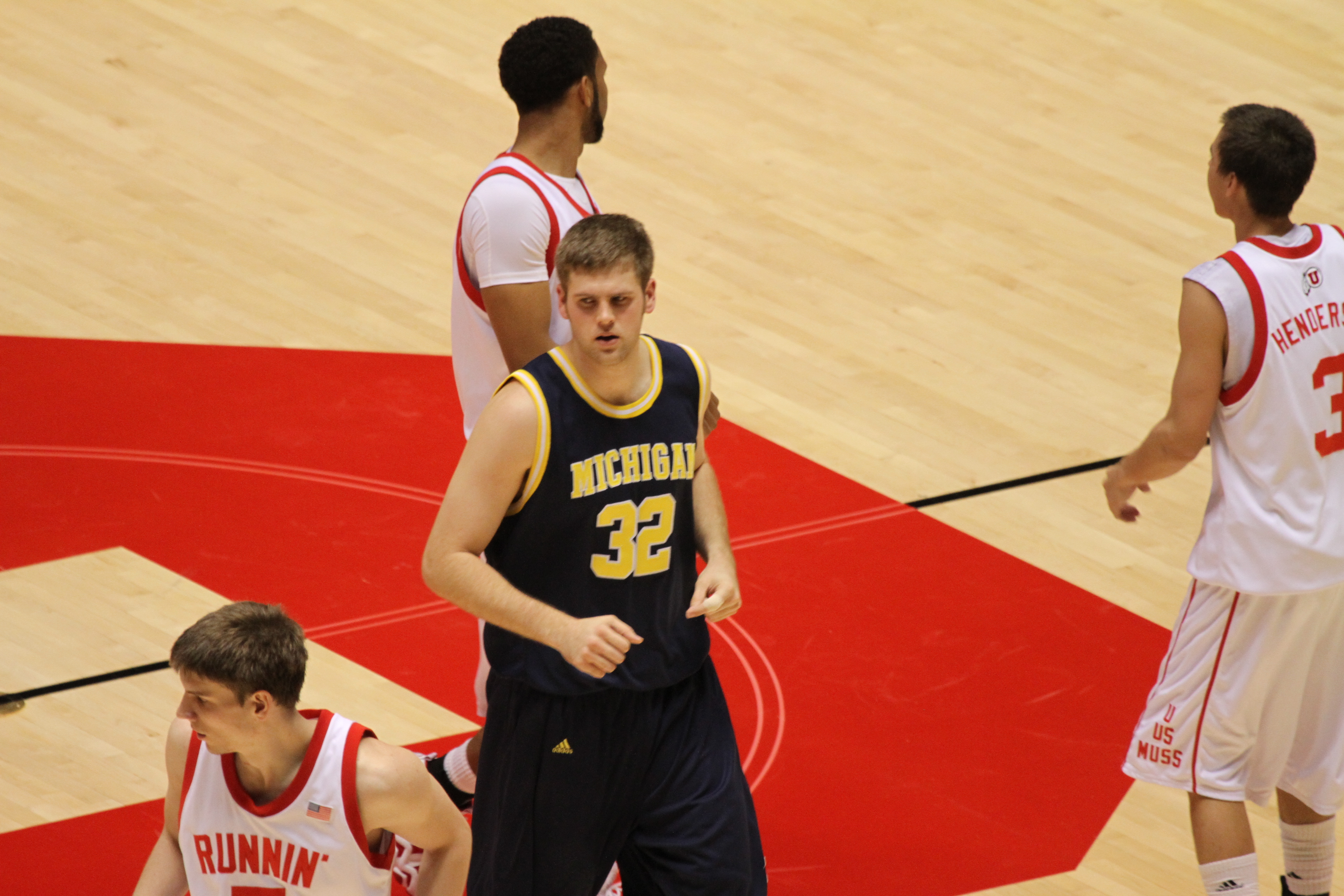
Zack Gibson

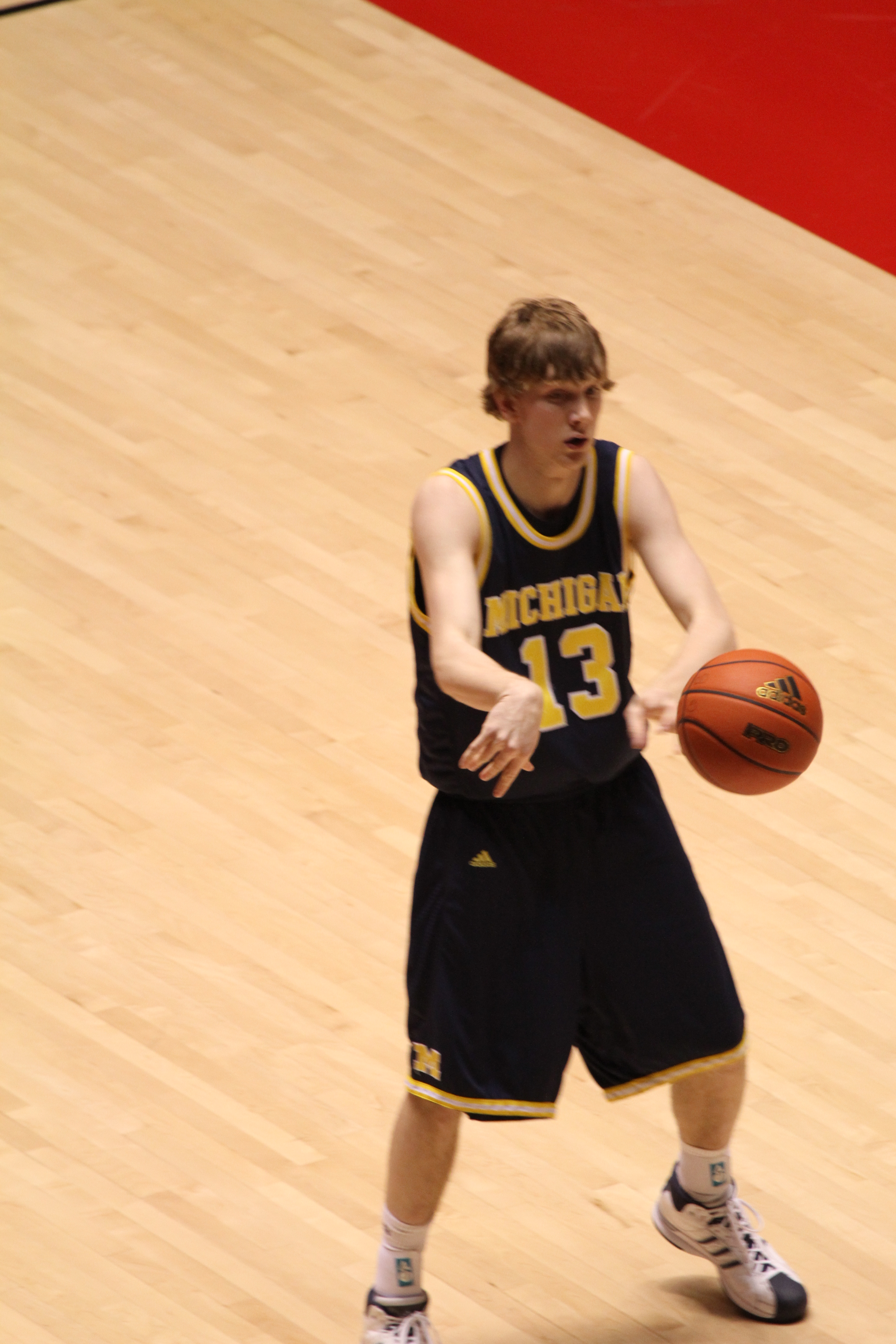
Matt Vogrich

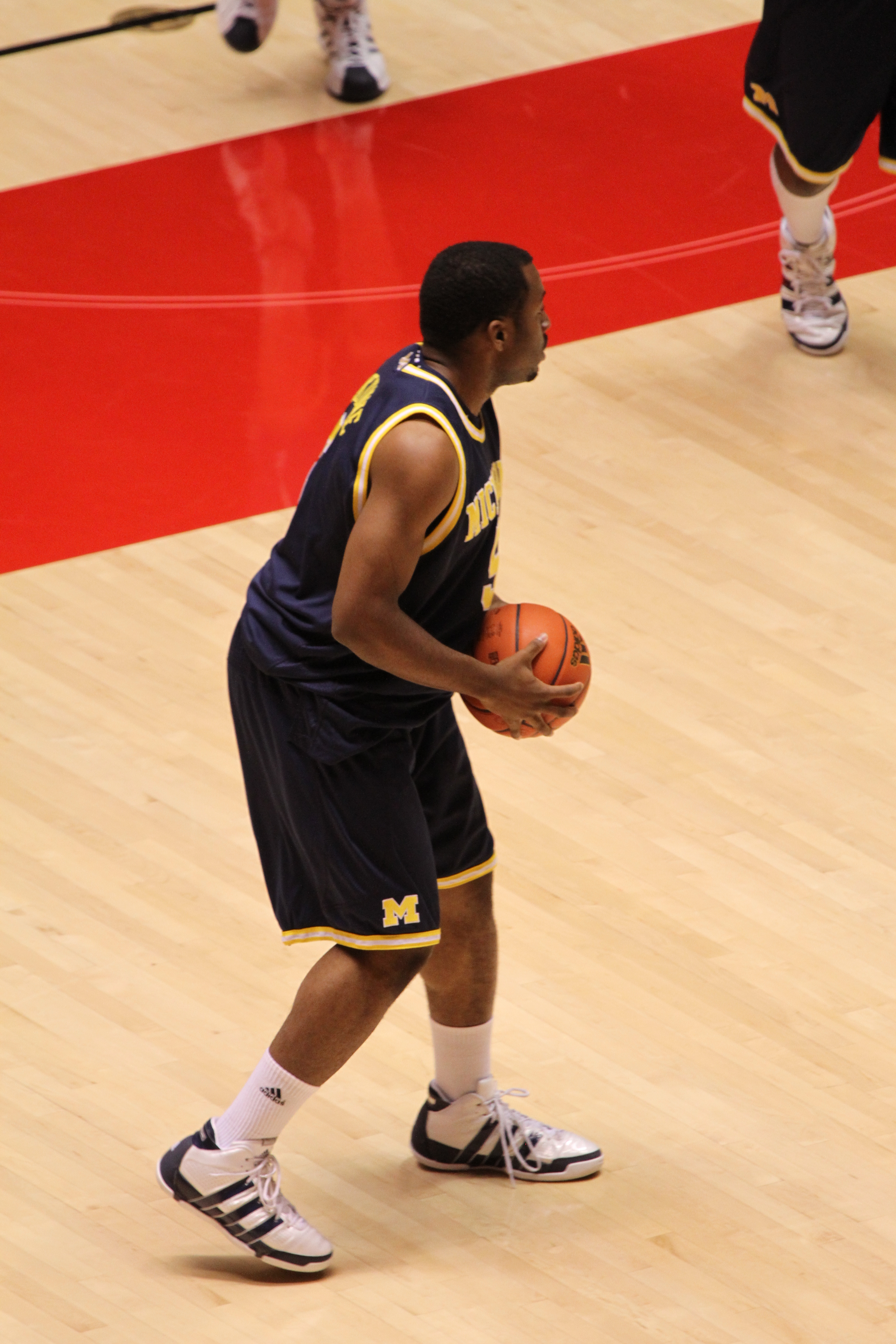
Eso Akunne

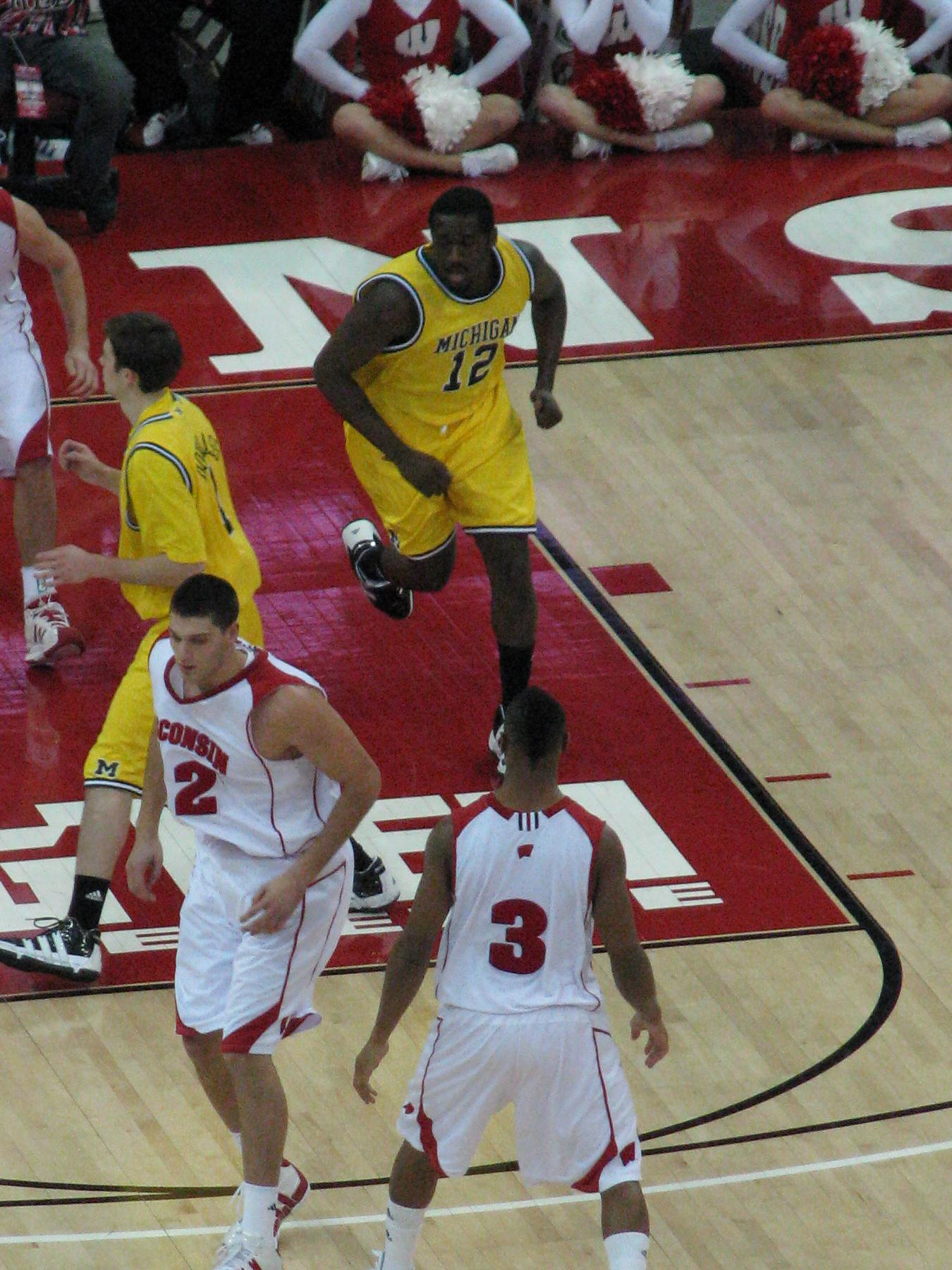
Anthony Wright

=== Signees ===
College recruiting
Name	Hometown	School	Height	Weight	Commit date
Darius Morris; PG	Los Angeles, California	Windward (CA)	6 ft 4 in (1.93 m)	188 lb (85 kg)	Nov 8, 2008
Darius Morris; PG	Recruit ratings: Scout: Rivals: (90)				
Matt Vogrich; SG	Lake Forest, Illinois	Lake Forest Academy (IL)	6 ft 3.5 in (1.92 m)	182.5 lb (82.8 kg)	May 10, 2008
Matt Vogrich; SG	Recruit ratings: Scout: Rivals: (89)				
Blake McLimans; PF	Hamburg (town), New York	Worcester Academy (MA)	6 ft 10 in (2.08 m)	210 lb (95 kg)	Oct 28, 2008
Blake McLimans; PF	Recruit ratings: Scout: Rivals: (85)				
Jordan Morgan; PF	Detroit, Michigan	University of Detroit Jesuit (MI)	6 ft 8 in (2.03 m)	242.5 lb (110.0 kg)	Dec 18, 2007
Jordan Morgan; PF	Recruit ratings: Scout: Rivals: (75)				
Overall recruit ranking:
Note: In many cases, Scout, Rivals, 247Sports, On3, and ESPN may conflict in their listings of height and weight.; In these cases, the average was taken. ESPN grades are on a 100-point scale.; Sources: "Michigan 2009 Basketball Commitments". Rivals.; "2009 Michigan Basketball Commits". Scout.; "ESPN". ESPN.; "Scout.com Team Recruiting Rankings". Scout.; "2009 Team Ranking". Rivals.

In addition to the four-year scholarship recruits above, Beilein recruited Eso Akunne as a preferred walk-on and eventually offered him a one-year scholarship commitment. Beilein also recruited Josh Bartelstein who extended his high school career at Phillips Exeter Academy after high school at Highland Park High School as a walk-on.

=== 2010–11 team recruits ===
The 2010 class includes Tim Hardaway Jr., son of Tim Hardaway.

College recruiting
Name	Hometown	School	Height	Weight	Commit date
Tim Hardaway; SG	Miami, Florida	Miami Palmetto High School (FL)	6 ft 3.5 in (1.92 m)	175 lb (79 kg)	Jun 29, 2009
Tim Hardaway; SG	Recruit ratings: Scout: Rivals: (93)				
Evan Smotrycz; SF	Reading, Massachusetts	New Hampton School (NH)	6 ft 8.5 in (2.04 m)	202.5 lb (91.9 kg)	Sep 4, 2009
Evan Smotrycz; SF	Recruit ratings: Scout: Rivals: (95)				
Overall recruit ranking: ESPN: 14
Note: In many cases, Scout, Rivals, 247Sports, On3, and ESPN may conflict in their listings of height and weight.; In these cases, the average was taken. ESPN grades are on a 100-point scale.; Sources: "Michigan 2010 Basketball Commitments". Rivals.; "2010 Michigan Basketball Commits". Scout.; "ESPN". ESPN.; "Scout.com Team Recruiting Rankings". Scout.; "2010 Team Ranking". Rivals.

== Rankings ==
Ranking movements Legend: ██ Increase in ranking ██ Decrease in ranking — = Not ranked RV = Received votes т = Tied with team above or below
	Week																			
Poll	Pre	1	2	3	4	5	6	7	8	9	10	11	12	13	14	15	16	17	18	Final
AP	15	15T	RV	—	—	—	—	—	—	—	—	—	—	—	—	—	—	—	—	Not released
Coaches'	15	16	15	RV	—	—	—	—	—	—	RV	—	—	—	—	—	—	—	—	—

== Season ==
=== Preconference ===
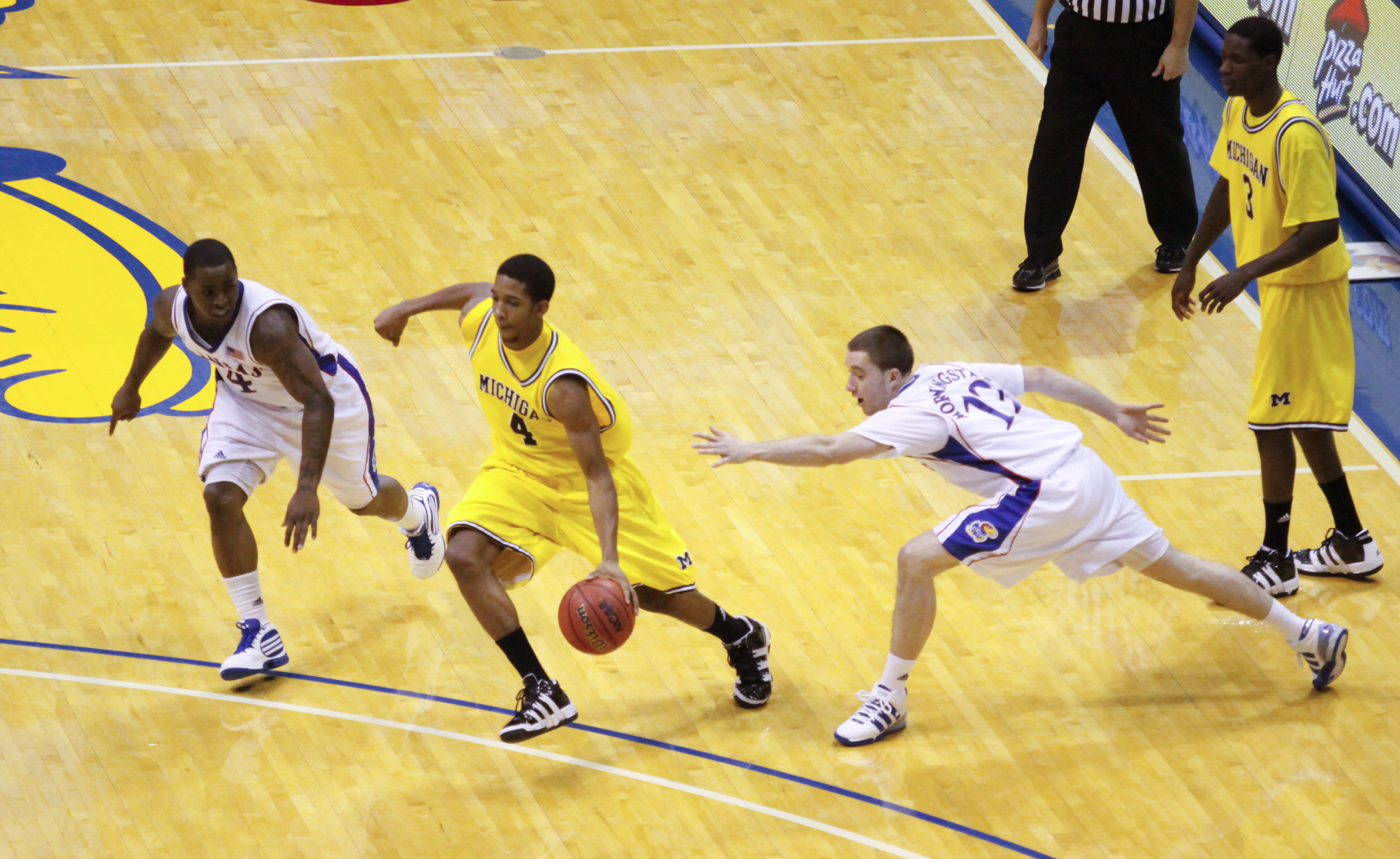
Manny Harris watches Darius Morris split the Kansas defense.

Harris opened the season by recording the second triple double in school history (Gary Grant was the first in the 1987 NCAA Men's Division I Basketball Tournament) with 18 points, 13 rebounds and 10 assists against Division II Northern Michigan during a 97–50 victory on November 14. Sims added 22 points and true freshman Matt Vogrich added 15 points on five-for-five three point shooting. Harris earned Big Ten player of the week during the first week of the year for the second consecutive season. Michigan struggled early against their first Division I opponent, by hitting only 4 of their first 21 shots. They recovered with a 29–13 run led by twelve points each from Harris and Sims to end the first half en route to a 77–55 victory against Houston Baptist. Sims posted a career high 5 three point shots.

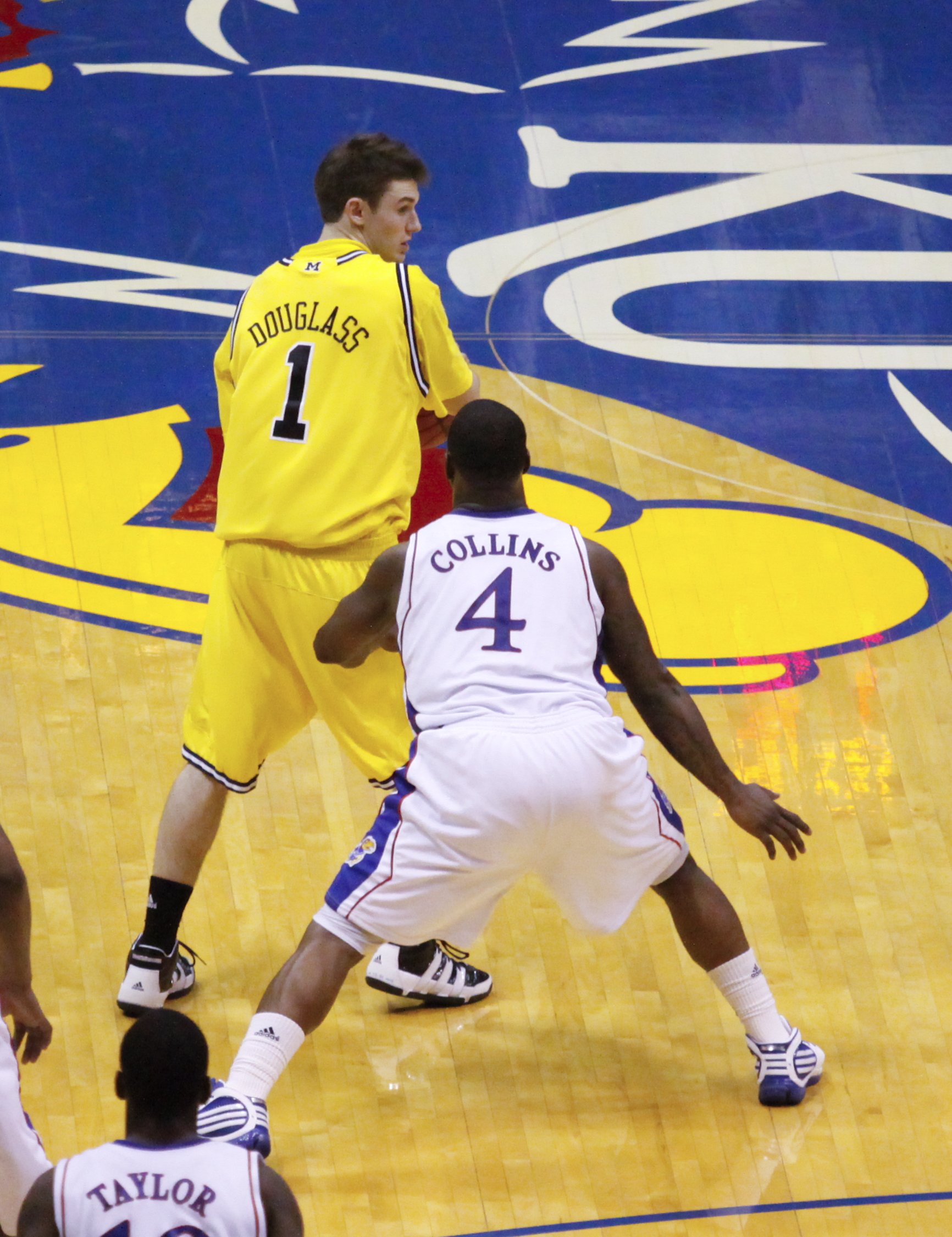
Douglass guarded by Sherron Collins of Kansas

During the Thanksgiving weekend, Michigan participated in the eight-team fourth annual Old Spice Classic at The Milk House in Orlando, Florida. On November 26, which was Thanksgiving Day, they defeated Creighton 83–76 in overtime when Harris fell one rebound shy of a triple double. Laval Lucas-Perry tied a career-high with 18 points and Sims added 16. The following day, they lost to a 6–0 Marquette team 79–65. They shot 12 for 18 from the free throw line and 3 for 20 from 3-point range. They lost the subsequent game to Alabama when a Darius Morris full-court drive was blocked.

The Wolverines began December competition in the ACC – Big Ten Challenge by losing to Boston College 62–58. The team ended its three-game losing streak by beating Arkansas - Pine Bluff. The Wolverines were outrebounded 41–25 in a 68–52 loss to the Utah Utes. Michigan rebounded as both Harris and Sims posted season highs with 27 and 23 points respectively in a 75–64 win over University of Detroit Mercy. The Wolverines fell to 1–21 all-time against number one ranked teams when it lost to Kansas. In the team's final pre-conference game, they beat Coppin State 76–46.

=== Conference ===
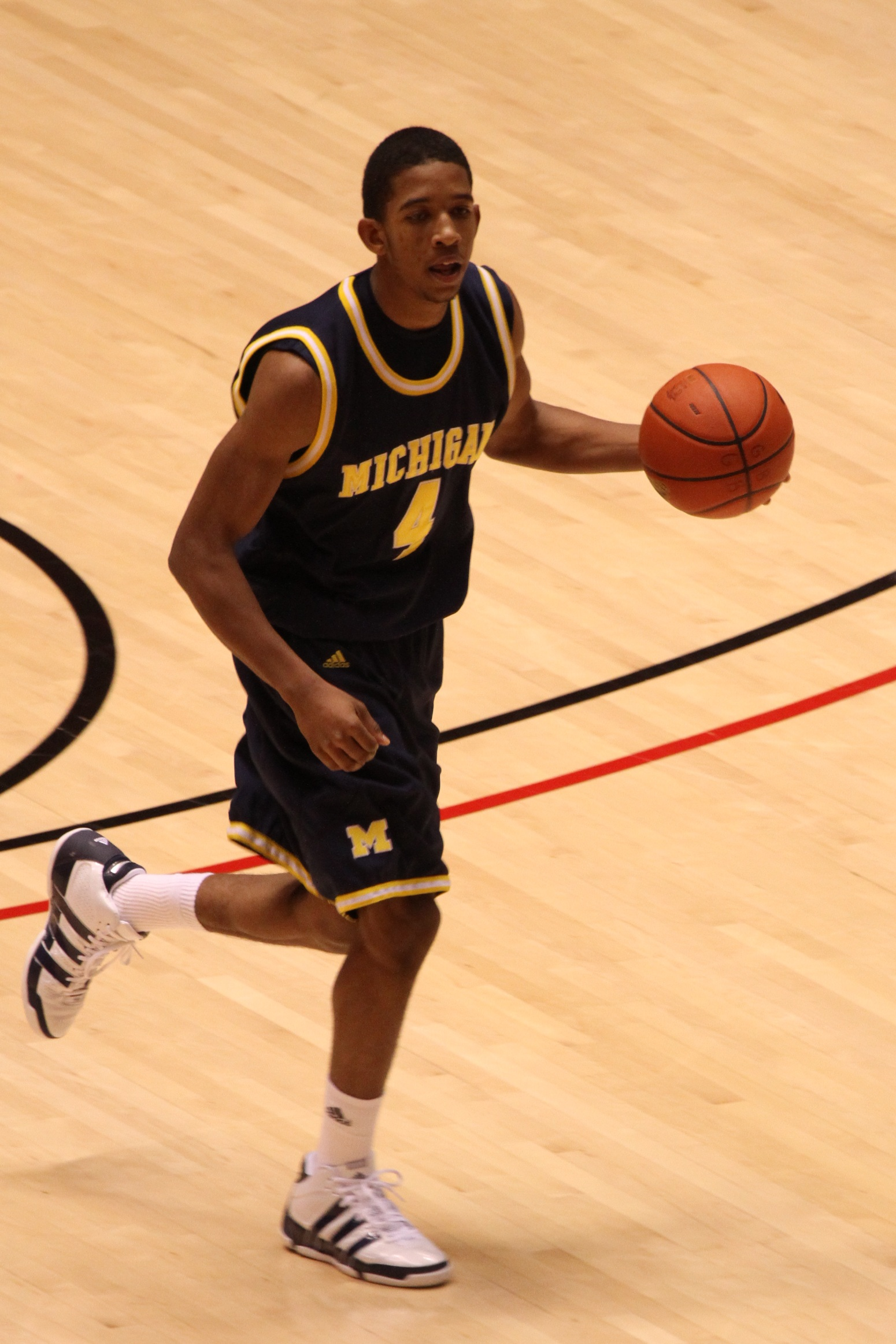
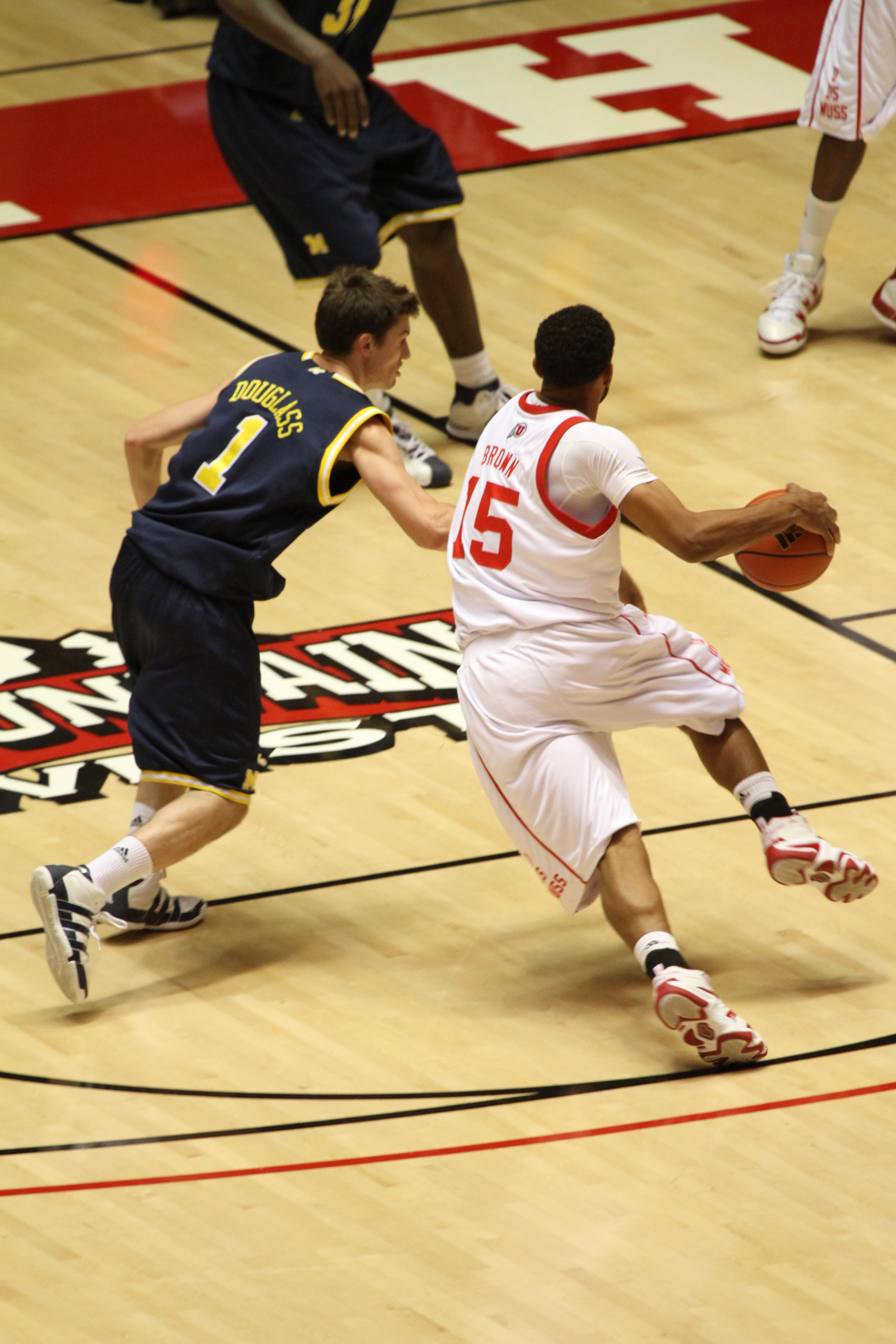
Darius Morris and Douglass (September 12, 2009)

January

Zack Novak and Stu Douglass led the Wolverines in scoring in their conference season opening 71–65 loss to Indiana on New Year's Eve. Sims and Harris led the way to the first conference victory on January 3 against a #15-ranked Ohio State team without its leading scorer, Evan Turner. On January 7, the Wolverines came from 16 points behind to defeat the Penn State Nittany Lions on the strength of four second half three point shots by Laval Lucas-Perry and 25 points from Sims. On January 10, they wasted a 17-point lead in a loss to Northwestern despite 24 points from Harris and 17 from Sims. On January 11, Sims became the second Wolverine to earn Big Ten Player of the Week for his efforts during week nine (January 4–10). The Wolverines won the January 14 rematch against Indiana under the leadership of Harris who had 17 second half points and Sims who added 20 points and 8 rebounds. Michigan then earned its first win against a ranked non-conference opponent and their second consecutive win against a ranked opponent on January 17 when it defeated #15 Connecticut 68–63 behind 18 points and 8 rebounds from Harris. Subsequently, they lost three consecutive games to ranked conference opponents. On January 20, Michigan opened up a lead on Wisconsin who missed its first eight field goal attempts. They led until Wisconsin tied the game with 4 minutes and 4 seconds remaining. Wisconsin scored two subsequent baskets to take the lead. Wisconsin held on despite 23 points and 13 rebounds from Sims. On January 23, while Manny Harris served a one-game suspension, Sims posted 21 points and Novak added 16, but after taking an 11–10 lead, the Wolverines surrendered a 16–2 run to Purdue that they never recovered from. On January 26, the Wolverines hosted Michigan State who needed a Kalin Lucas basket with 3.5 seconds to play to earn the win, which resulted in Michigan state posting a school-record eight consecutive conference victories to start conference play. On January 30, Michigan finished the month with a 60–46 win against Iowa to snap its three-game losing streak. Harris and Sims both contributed 20 points. Sims had 12 rebounds as well. Michigan scored the first 13 points of the game and after taking a 12-point lead into halftime, they scored the first 5 points of the second half.

February

The Wolverines began February with a 67–52 loss to Northwestern on February 2. Harris and Darius Morris, who each posted 11, were the high scorers. Northwestern pulled away with a 21–4 second half run. On February 6, Michigan lost 62–44 to 16th ranked Wisconsin, who shot 9 for 13 on three point shots in the first half and only missed seven total shots in that time. Then Michigan only made one shot in the first eight minutes of the second half. Then, Michigan went 7 for 14 on its three-point shots to beat Minnesota 71–63 behind 27 points from Sims and 20 from Harris. On February 16, Michigan recovered from a 5-point deficit in the final twenty seconds on late shots by Sims including a three-pointer with 6.1 seconds remaining. Sims had 27 and Harris had 20 points as they both accumulated 10 rebounds and the team shot 14–27 on its three-point shots. In overtime Michigan, come from three points behind. On February 20, despite 20 points by Harris, Michigan was unable to notch its first three-game winning streak against Penn State. On February 23, Michigan shot only 20% in the first half and fell behind 26–18 and trailed Illinois most of the rest of the game despite 15 points and 11 rebounds from Harris. On February 27, Michigan lost to Ohio State despite all of its starters scoring in double digits.

March

On March 2, Michigan defeated Minnesota 83–55 as Harris and Sims posted 23 and 22 points, respectively. The team posted its best shooting night of the season by going 32 for 53. On March 7, Michigan concluded its regular season with a 64–48 loss to Michigan State. None of Michigan's starters posted double digit scoring and Zack Gibson led the team with 10 points. The team only scored 14 points in the first half and did not score in the first 3 minutes and 50 seconds of the second half. As a result, the team fell to a 7–11 conference record and was accorded the eighth seed in the 2010 Big Ten Conference men's basketball tournament where they were matched against ninth-seeded Iowa. They defeated Iowa 59–52 behind 22 points, 9 rebounds and 3 steals by Harris. This earned them a matchup against the top-seeded Ohio State Buckeyes. After trailing #5-ranked Ohio State by a 51–38 margin, sharpshooting by Harris and Douglass brought Michigan to within 59–57, which led to a frantic finish. Harris hit a shot with 2.2 seconds remaining to give Michigan a two-point lead before Turner hit a 37-foot 3-point shot to win the game.

== Schedule ==
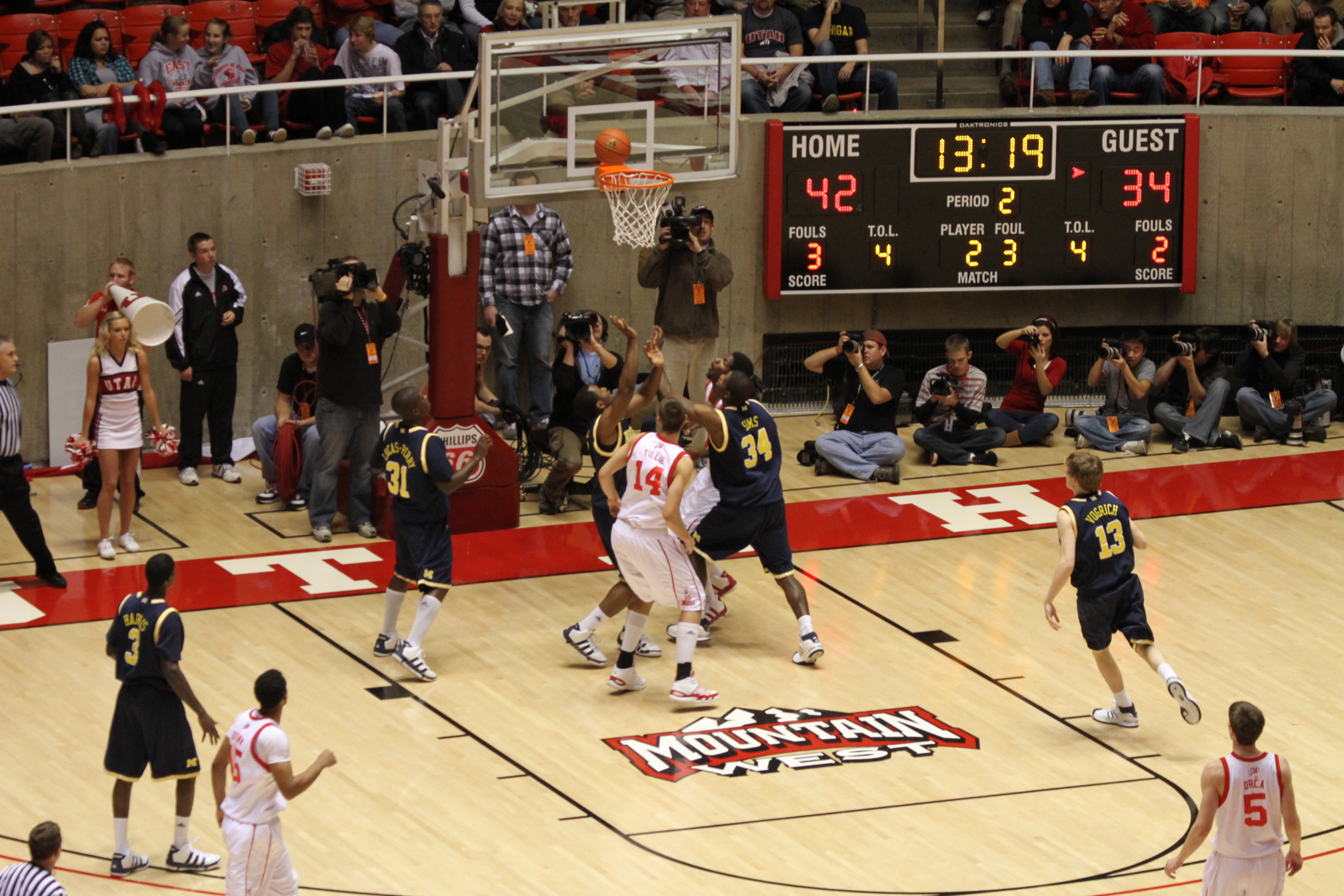
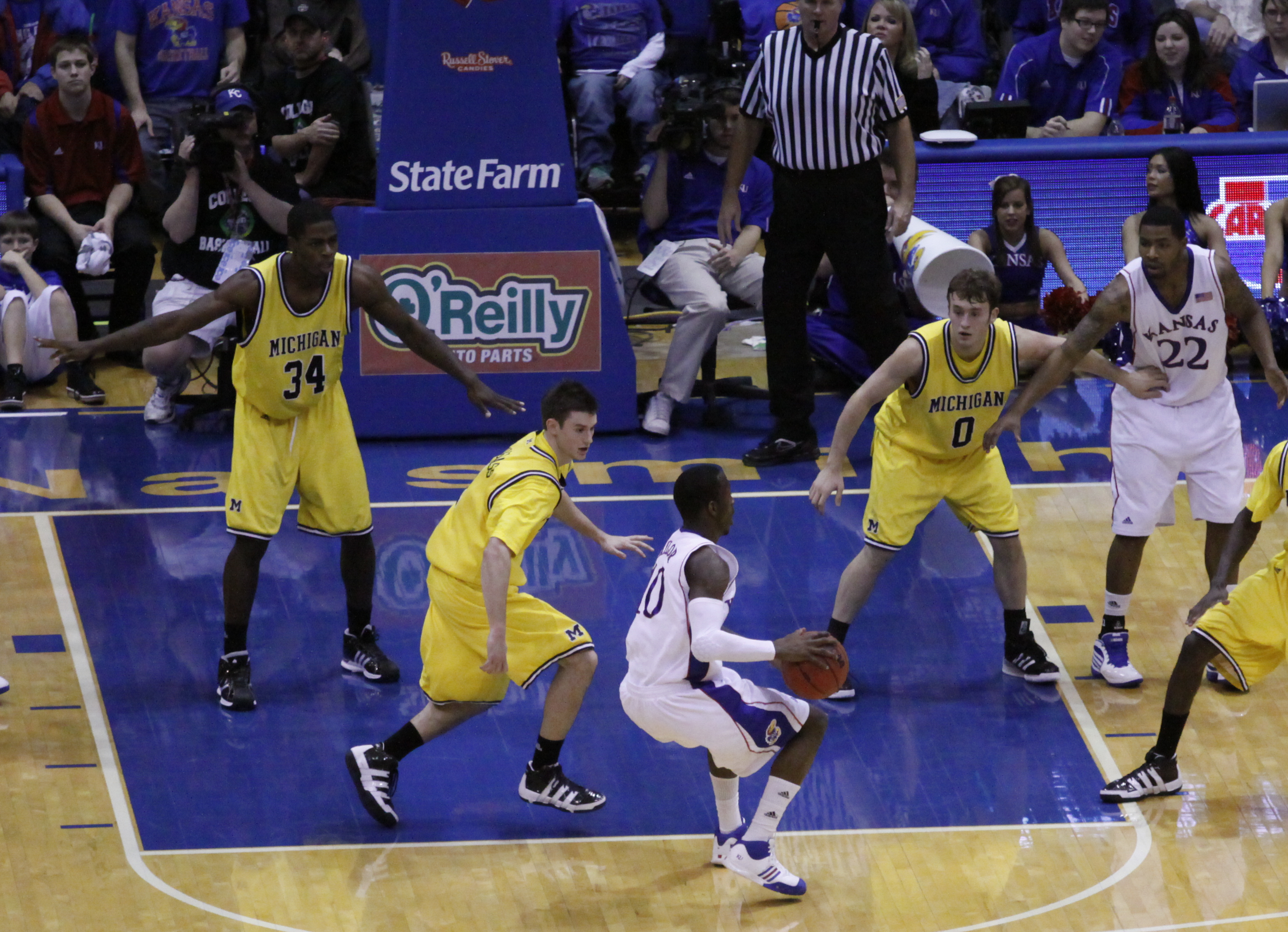
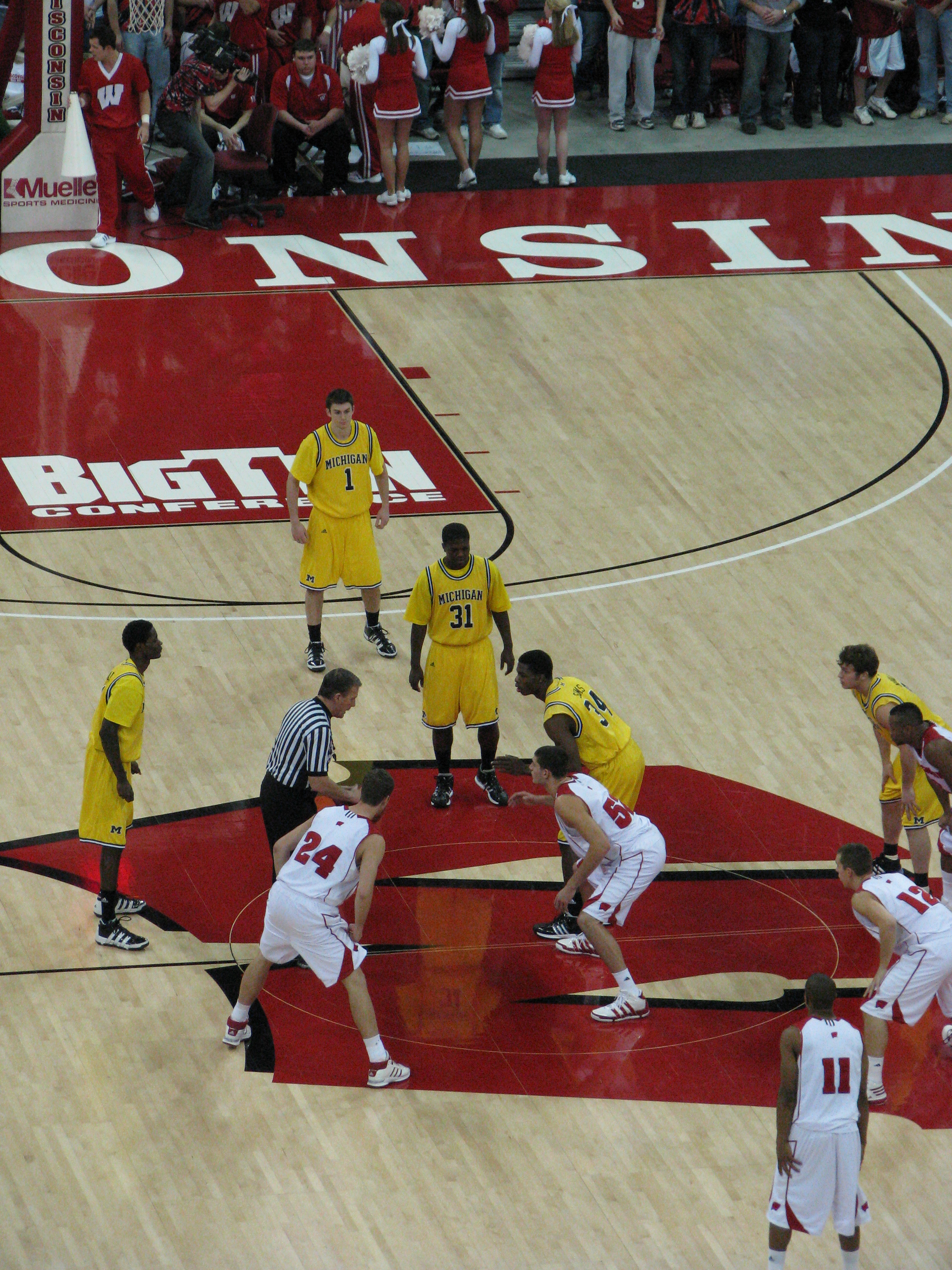
Left: Wolverines vs. Utah (2009-12-09); Center: Sims (34), Novak (0) and Douglass (1) defend against #1-ranked Kansas. (2009-12-19); Right: DeShawn Sims prepareS for the opening tipoff against Wisconsin as Harris (# not visible), Lucas-Perry (31) Novak (# not visible) and Douglass (1) look on. (2010-01-20)

Date time, TV	Rank^{#}	Opponent^{#}	Result	Record	High points	High rebounds	High assists	Site (attendance) city, state
Exhibition
November 6, 2009*; 7:00 pm ET, BTN.com	No. 15	Wayne State	W 73–54		25 – Manny Harris	5 – Harris, DeShawn Sims	4 – Harris	Crisler Arena (9,657); Ann Arbor, Michigan
Non-conference Regular Season
November 14, 2009*; 7:00 pm ET, Big Ten Network	No. 15	Northern Michigan	W 97–50	1–0	22 – Sims (1)	13 – Harris (1)	10 – Harris (1)	Crisler Arena (9,730); Ann Arbor, Michigan
November 20, 2009*; 7:00 pm ET, BTN.com	No. 15	Houston Baptist	W 77–55	2–0	25 – Harris (1)	8 – Harris (2)	7 – Stu Douglass (1)	Crisler Arena (10,523); Ann Arbor, Michigan
November 26, 2009*; 12:00 pm ET, ESPN2	No. 15	vs. Creighton; Old Spice Classic	W 83–76 ^{OT}	3–0	20 – Harris (2)	11 – Sims (1)	11 – Harris (2)	The Milk House (2,853); Orlando, Florida
November 27, 2009*; 12:00 pm ET, ESPN	No. 15	vs. Marquette; Old Spice Classic Semifinals	L 79–65	3–1	22 – Harris (3)	8 – Harris (3)	4 – Harris (3)	The Milk House (3,660); Orlando, Florida
November 29, 2009*; 5:00 pm ET, ESPNU	No. 15	vs. Alabama; Old Spice Classic Third Place	L 68–66	3–2	26 – Harris (4)	10 – Harris (4)	4 – Laval Lucas-Perry (1)	The Milk House (2,225); Orlando, Florida
December 2, 2009*; 7:30 pm ET, ESPN2		Boston College; ACC – Big Ten Challenge	L 62–58	3–3	19 – Harris (5)	7 – Harris (5)	6 – Harris (4)	Crisler Arena (10,718); Ann Arbor, Michigan
December 5, 2009*; 2:00 pm ET, BTN.com		Arkansas-Pine Bluff	W 67–53	4–3	19 – Sims (2)	10 – Sims (2)	4 – Douglass (2)	Crisler Arena (10,073); Ann Arbor, Michigan
December 9, 2009*; 9:00 pm ET, CBSCS		at Utah	L 68–52	4–4	25 – Harris (6)	6 – Harris (6)	4 – Darius Morris (1)	Jon M. Huntsman Center (9,227); Salt Lake City, Utah
December 13, 2009*; 12:00 pm ET, Big Ten Network		Detroit Mercy	W 75–64	5–4	27 – Harris (7)	12 – Sims (3)	6 – Harris (5)	Crisler Arena (11,163); Ann Arbor, Michigan
December 19, 2009*; 12:00 pm ET, ESPN		at No. 1 Kansas	L 75–64	5–5	19 – Sims (3)	7 – Zack Novak (1), Sims (4)	4 – Harris (6), Morris (2)	Allen Fieldhouse (16,300); Lawrence, Kansas
December 22, 2009*; 7:00 pm ET, BTN.com		Coppin State	W 76–46	6–5	20 – Douglass (1)	6 – Lucas-Perry (1)	7 – Harris (7)	Crisler Arena (10,163); Ann Arbor, Michigan
Big Ten Regular Season
December 31, 2009; 12:00 pm ET, ESPN2		at Indiana	L 71–65	6–6 (0–1)	18 – Novak (1)	9 – Novak (2)	5 – Lucas-Perry (2)	Assembly Hall (15,034); Bloomington, Indiana
Jan 3, 2010; 4:30 pm ET, Big Ten Network		No. 15 Ohio State	W 73–64	7–6 (1–1)	28 – Sims (4)	9 – Sims (5)	5 – Harris (8)	Crisler Arena (13,751); Ann Arbor, Michigan
Jan 7, 2010; 7:00 pm ET, ESPN2		at Penn State	W 64–55	8–6 (2–1)	25 – Sims (5)	6 – Sims (6)	4 – Harris (9), Morris (3)	Bryce Jordan Center (5,799); State College, Pennsylvania
January 10, 2010; 2:30 pm ET, Big Ten Network		Northwestern	L 68–62	8–7 (2–2)	24 – Harris (8)	9 – Harris (7)	7 – Morris (4)	Crisler Arena (11,851); Ann Arbor, Michigan
January 14, 2010; 9:00 pm ET, ESPN		Indiana	W 69–45	9–7 (3–2)	21 – Harris (9)	8 – Sims (7)	4 – Morris (5)	Crisler Arena (9,632); Ann Arbor, Michigan
January 17, 2010*; 1:30 pm ET, CBS		No. 15 Connecticut	W 68–63	10–7 (3–2)	18 – Harris (10)	11 – Sims (8)	4 – Douglass (3)	Crisler Arena (13,536); Ann Arbor, Michigan
January 20, 2010; 8:30 pm ET, Big Ten Network		at No. 18 Wisconsin	L 54–48	10–8 (3–3)	23 – Sims (6)	13 – Sims (9)	3 – Douglass (4)	Kohl Center (17,230); Madison, Wisconsin
January 23, 2010; 4:00 pm ET, ESPN		at No. 13 Purdue	L 69–59	10–9 (3–4)	21 – Sims (7)	8 – Sims (10)	5 – Douglass (5)	Mackey Arena (14,123); West Lafayette, Indiana
January 26, 2010; 7:00 pm ET, ESPN		No. 5 Michigan State	L 57–56	10–10 (3–5)	19 – Sims (8)	6 – Novak (3)	5 – Harris (10)	Crisler Arena (13,751); Ann Arbor, Michigan
January 30, 2010; 4:30 pm ET, Big Ten Network		Iowa	W 60–46	11–10 (4–5)	20 – Harris (11), Sims (9)	12 – Sims (11)	3 – Harris (11), Novak (1)	Crisler Arena (13,541); Ann Arbor, Michigan
February 2, 2010; 7:00 pm ET, Big Ten Network		at Northwestern	L 67–52	11–11 (4–6)	11 – Harris (12), Morris (1)	7 – Sims (12)	3 – Harris (12), Lucas-Perry (3)	Welsh-Ryan Arena (5,127); Evanston, Illinois
Feb 6, 2010; 4:00 pm ET, CBS		No. 16 Wisconsin	L 62–44	11–12 (4–7)	18 – Sims (10)	4 – Harris (8), Sims (13)	3 – Douglass (6), Morris (6)	Crisler Arena (13,501); Ann Arbor, Michigan
February 11, 2010; 7:00 pm ET, ESPN		at Minnesota	W 71–63	12–12 (5–7)	27 – Sims (11)	7 – Sims (14)	7 – Harris (13)	Williams Arena (14,625); Minneapolis, Minnesota
February 16, 2010; 9:00 pm ET, Big Ten Network		at Iowa	W 80–78 ^{OT}	13–12 (6–7)	27 – Sims (12)	10 – Harris (9), Sims (15)	7 – Harris (14)	Carver-Hawkeye Arena (9,485); Iowa City, Iowa
February 20, 2010; 6:00 pm ET, Big Ten Network		Penn State	L 55–51	13–13 (6–8)	20 – Harris (13)	8 – Sims (16)	4 – Morris (7)	Crisler Arena (13,751); Ann Arbor, Michigan
February 23, 2010; 7:00 pm ET, ESPN		Illinois	L 51–44	13–14 (6–9)	15 – Harris (14)	13 – Sims (17)	4 – Harris (15)	Crisler Arena (11,357); Ann Arbor, Michigan
February 27, 2010; 12:00 pm ET, ESPN		at No. 9 Ohio State	L 66–55	13–15 (6–10)	11 – Morris (2), Novak (2), Sims (13)	6 – Sims (18)	3 – Harris (16), Morris (8)	Jerome Schottenstein Center (18,862); Columbus, Ohio
March 2, 2010; 7:00 pm ET, Big Ten Network		Minnesota	W 83–55	14–15 (7–10)	23 – Sims (14)	6 – Novak (4), Sims (19)	6 – Morris (9), Novak (2)	Crisler Arena (10,561); Ann Arbor, Michigan
March 7, 2010; 4:00 pm ET, CBS		at No. 11 Michigan State	L 64–48	14–16 (7–11)	10 – Zack Gibson (1)	9 – Sims (20)	5 – Harris (17)	Breslin Center (14,759); East Lansing, Michigan
Big Ten tournament
March 11, 2010; 2:30 pm ET, ESPN2		vs. Iowa; First Round	W 59–52	15–16 (7–11)	22 – Harris (15)	9 – Harris (10)	3 – Douglass (7), Lucas-Perry (4), Morris (10)	Conseco Fieldhouse (14,833); Indianapolis, Indiana
March 12, 2010; 12:00 pm ET, ESPN		vs. No. 5 Ohio State; Second Round	L 69–68	15–17 (7–11)	26 – Harris (16)	6 – Harris (11), Sims (21)	4 – Harris (18)	Conseco Fieldhouse (NA); Indianapolis, Indiana
*Non-conference game. ^{#}Rankings from AP Poll. (#) Tournament seedings in parentheses. All times are in Eastern Time.

== Statistics ==
The team posted the following statistics:

Name	GP	GS	Min	Avg	FG	FGA	FG%	3FG	3FGA	3FG%	FT	FTA	FT%	OR	DR	RB	Avg	Ast	Avg	PF	DQ	TO	Stl	Blk	Pts	Avg
Manny Harris	31		1120	36.1	181	430	0.421	48	156	0.308	152	190	0.800	57	130	187	6.0	126	4.1	45	0	88	56	11	562	18.1
DeShawn Sims	32	32	1026	32.1	220	447	0.492	21	74	0.284	75	112	0.670	98	144	242	7.6	30	0.9	71	3	48	35	21	536	16.8
Zack Novak	31	31	1028	33.2	79	211	0.374	44	144	0.306	26	38	0.684	43	89	132	4.3	50	1.6	88	1	23	30	8	228	7.3
Stu Douglass	32		1004	31.4	72	216	0.333	52	158	0.329	21	27	0.778	7	63	70	2.2	79	2.5	43	0	35	35	0	217	6.8
Laval Lucas-Perry	32		683	21.3	50	144	0.347	30	103	0.291	25	39	0.641	13	62	75	2.3	53	1.7	62	0	30	19	1	155	4.8
Darius Morris	32		777	24.3	52	128	0.406	7	39	0.179	29	46	0.630	14	44	58	1.8	84	2.6	61	0	51	20	5	140	4.4
Zack Gibson	32		319	10.0	44	76	0.579	5	18	0.278	33	42	0.786	29	39	68	2.1	8	0.3	54	1	16	15	17	126	3.9
Matt Vogrich	30		166	5.5	17	42	0.405	11	28	0.393	1	3	0.333	5	14	19	0.6	8	0.3	16	0	9	8	0	46	1.5
Anthony Wright	28		241	8.6	14	52	0.269	9	36	0.250	3	5	0.600	9	22	31	1.1	15	0.5	17	0	15	4	3	40	1.4
Eso Akunne	7		38	5.4	2	3	0.667	0	0		1	1	1.000	0	6	6	0.9	1	0.1	4	0	2	1	1	5	0.7
Ben Cronin	5		16	3.2	1	3	0.333	0	0		1	4	0.250	2	3	5	1.0	0	0.0	2	0	2	0	1	3	0.6
Corey Person	7		13	1.9	0	0		0	0		1	2	0.500	0	2	2	0.3	2	0.3	2	0	0	0	0	1	0.1
Josh Bartelstein	5		13	2.6	0	4	0.000	0	3	0.000	0	0		0	0	0	0.0	0	0.0	3	0	1	0	0	0	0.0
Eric Puls	2	0	6	3.0	0	2	0.000	0	1	0.000	0	0		0	1	1	0.5	0	0.0	0	0	0	0	0	0	0.0
TEAM	32													43	51	94	2.9					6				
Season Total	32				732	1758	0.416	227	760	0.299	368	509	0.723	320	670	990	30.9	456	14.3	468	5	326	223	68	2059	64.3
Opponents	32				752	1698	0.443	177	553	0.320	289	428	0.675	349	764	1113	34.8	430	13.4	513		452	165	97	1970	61.6

== Individual Honors ==
Harris was named as a finalist for the 2010 Bob Cousy Award and a Midseason Top-30 finalist for the 2010 John Wooden Award. Novak was a District 4 first-team 2009 Academic All-District Men's Basketball Team selection as selected by ESPN The Magazine and College Sports Information Directors of America. Sims and Harris were both selected as second team National Association of Basketball Coaches All-District 7. Both the Big Ten coaches and the media selected Sims and Harris to the 2nd and 3rd All-conference teams, respectively. Sims was also recognized as Michigan's Big Ten Sportsmanship Awards honoree. Harris and Novak were selected as Academic All-Conference performers. Neither Harris nor Sims was drafted in the 2010 NBA draft.

Manny Harris

- Preseason first-team All-Big Ten
- Preseason John Wooden Award Top 50 watchlist
- Preseason Naismith Award Top 50 watchlist
- November 16, 2009 Big Ten Conference Player of the week
- Midseason Wooden Award Top-30 finalist
- Bob Cousy Award finalist
- National Association of Basketball Coaches All-District second-team
- All-Big Ten 3rd-team
- Academic All-Conference

DeShawn Sims

- Preseason John Wooden Award Top 50 watchlist
- January 11, 2010 Big Ten Conferenct Player of the week
- National Association of Basketball Coaches All-District second-team
- All-Big Ten 2nd-team
- Big Ten Sportsmanship Awards

Zack Novak

- ESPN The Magazine and CoSIDA Academic All-District
- Academic All-Conference

== Team players drafted into the NBA ==
One player from this team was selected in the NBA draft.

Year	Round	Pick	Overall	Player	NBA club
2011	2	11	41	Darius Morris	Los Angeles Lakers

== See also ==
- 2009-10 Big Ten Conference men's basketball season
- 2010 Big Ten Conference men's basketball tournament
- 2010 NCAA Men's Division I Basketball Tournament
- 2009 Michigan Wolverines football team
- 2009–10 Michigan Wolverines men's ice hockey team
