= 2009–10 Michigan Wolverines men's ice hockey season =

Sports season

- Conference: CCHA
- Home ice: Yost Ice Arena

Rankings
- USA Today/USA Hockey Magazine: TBD
- USCHO.com/CBS College Sports: TBD

Record
- Overall: 17-15-1
- Home: 8-4-1
- Road: 7-9-0
- Neutral: 2-2-0

Coaches and captains
- Head coach: Red Berenson
- Captain: Chris Summers

The 2009–10 Michigan Wolverines men's ice hockey team is the Wolverines' 88th season. They represent the University of Michigan in the 2009–10 NCAA Division I men's ice hockey season. The team is coached by Red Berenson and play their home games at Yost Ice Arena. Assisting Berenson will be Mel Pearson, Billy Powers, and Josh Blackburn.

== Offseason ==
- June 27: Two incoming freshmen from the University of Michigan were chosen in the 2009 NHL entry draft on Saturday (June 27). Forwards Chris Brown and Kevin Lynch were second-round draft picks. Brown went 36th overall to the Phoenix Coyotes, while Lynch was picked by the Columbus Blue Jackets 56th overall. Michigan's 2009-10 roster is slated to include 12 players who have been drafted by NHL franchises.

== Pre-season ==
2009 Pre-season Game Log: 0–0–0 (Home: 0–0–0; Road: 0–0–0)

#	Date	Visitor	Score	Home	OT	Decision	Attendance	Record	Recap
1	October 3	United States NTDP Under-18		Michigan Wolverines					
2	October 4	Windsor Lancers		Michigan Wolverines					

== Regular season ==
=== Standings ===
2009–10 Central Collegiate Hockey Association standings
	Conference								Overall					
	GP	W	L	T	SW	PTS	GF	GA	GP	W	L	T	GF	GA
#3 Miami†	28	21	2	5	2	70	100	39	44	29	8	7	147	86
Michigan State	28	14	8	6	2	50	73	64	38	19	13	6	115	97
#14 Ferris State	28	13	9	6	4	49	79	66	40	21	13	6	118	92
#13 Northern Michigan	28	13	9	6	3	48	86	72	41	20	13	8	124	104
#15 Alaska	28	0^	28^	0^	0^	45	73	70	39	0^	39^	0^	108	93
Nebraska–Omaha	28	13	12	3	2	44	85	83	42	20	16	6	124	116
#8 Michigan*	28	14	13	1	0	43	83	69	45	26	18	1	148	102
Ohio State	28	10	12	6	4	40	81	93	39	15	18	6	110	122
Notre Dame	28	9	12	7	2	36	65	76	38	13	17	8	90	102
Lake Superior State	28	10	15	3	2	35	66	90	38	15	18	5	93	118
Bowling Green	28	4	18	6	5	23	58	102	36	5	25	6	71	138
Western Michigan	28	4	17	7	2	21	62	87	36	8	20	8	76	104
Championship: Michigan † indicates conference regular season champion * indicates conference tournament champion Final rankings: USA Today/USA Hockey Magazine Top 15 Poll^ Alaska was retroactively required to forfeit all wins and ties due to player ineligibilities.

=== Roster ===
As of December 2009.

Goaltenders
#	State	Player	Year	Hometown	Ht.	Wt.	NHL rights
30	(Michigan)	Patrick Summers	Fr	Milan, Michigan	5-11	165	None
31	(Michigan)	Shawn Hunwick	Jr	Sterling Heights, Michigan	5-7	165	None
35	(Michigan)	Bryan Hogan	Jr	Highland, Michigan	6-1	187	None

Defensemen
#	State	Player	Year	Hometown	Ht.	Wt.	NHL rights
2	(Michigan)	Greg Pateryn	So	Sterling Heights, Michigan	6-3	216	Montreal Canadiens
3	(California)	Scooter Vaughan	Jr	Placentia, California	6-1	190	None
4	(Michigan)	Chris Summers	Sr	Milan, Michigan	6-3	196	Phoenix Coyotes
5	(Michigan)	Steve Kampfer	Sr	Jackson, Michigan	6-0	190	Anaheim Ducks
6	(Ontario)	Brandon Burlon	So	Nobleton, Ontario	6-1	190	New Jersey Devils
7	(Washington (state))	Chad Langlais	Jr	Spokane, Washington	5-9	175	None
13	(Connecticut)	Lee Moffie	Fr	Wallingford, Connecticut	6-1	199	None
20	(Michigan)	Eric Elmblad	Sr	St. Ignace, Michigan	6-6	205	None
34	(Michigan)	Tristin Llewellyn	Jr	Ann Arbor, Michigan	6-2	205	None

Forwards
#	State	Player	Year	Hometown	Ht.	Wt.	NHL rights
10	(Texas)	Chris Brown	Fr	Flower Mound, Texas	6-2	191	Phoenix Coyotes
11	(Michigan)	Kevin Lynch	Fr	Grosse Pointe, Michigan	6-1	190	Columbus Blue Jackets
12	(Sweden)	Carl Hagelin	Jr	Södertälje, Sweden	6-0	185	New York Rangers
14	(British Columbia)	Brian Lebler	Sr	Penticton, B.C.	6-3	212	None
15	(Michigan)	Anthony Ciraulo	Sr	Clinton Township, Michigan	5-7	170	None
16	(British Columbia)	Ben Winnett	Jr	New Westminster, B.C.	6-1	185	Toronto Maple Leafs
19	(Michigan)	Matt Rust	Jr	Bloomfield Hills, Michigan	5-10	197	Florida Panthers
21	(Michigan)	A.J. Treais	Fr	Bloomfield Hills, Michigan	5-7	160	None
22	(Michigan)	Jeff Rohrkemper	Fr	Grosse Pointe, Michigan	5-11	177	None
23	(Michigan)	Luke Glendening	So	Grand Rapids, Michigan	6-0	185	None
25	(Michigan)	David Wohlberg	So	South Lyon, Michigan	6-1	192	New Jersey Devils
29	(Ontario)	Louie Caporusso	Jr	Woodbridge, Ontario	5-10	185	Ottawa Senators
39	(Ontario)	Lindsay Sparks	Fr	Oakville, Ontario	5-9	170	None

=== Tournaments ===
The Wolverines will compete in the following tournaments:

- Kendall Auto Hockey Classic in Anchorage, Alaska from October 9 to 10.
- 17th Annual College Hockey Showcase from November 27 to 28.
- 45th Annual Great Lakes Invitational from December 29 to 30.
- Camp Randall Hockey Classic on February 6.

=== Schedule ===
2009–10 Game Log
October: 0-0-0 (Home: 0-0-0; Road: 0-0-0)

Game	Date	Opponent	Score	Location/Attendance	Record
1	October 9	Alaska		Anchorage, Alaska	
2	October 10	Alaska-Anchorage		Anchorage, Alaska	
3	October 22	Niagara		Ann Arbor, Mich.	
4	October 24	Boston University		Boston, Mass.	
5	October 30	Lake Superior State		Sault Ste. Marie, Mich.	
6	October 31	Lake Superior State		Sault Ste. Marie, Mich.	

November: 0-0-0 (Home: 0-0-0; Road: 0-0-0)

Game	Date	Opponent	Score	Location/Attendance	Record
7	November 6	Miami, OH		Ann Arbor, Michigan	
8	November 7	Miami, OH		Ann Arbor, Michigan	
9	November 13	Michigan State		Ann Arbor, Michigan	
10	November 14	Michigan State		East Lansing, Michigan	
11	November 20	Bowling Green		Ann Arbor, Michigan	
12	November 21	Bowling Green		Toledo, OH	
13	November 27	Minnesota		Ann Arbor, Michigan	
14	November 28	Wisconsin		Ann Arbor, Michigan	

December: 0-0-0 (Home: 0-0-0; Road: 0-0-0)

Game	Date	Opponent	Score	Location/Attendance	Record
15	December 4	Ohio State		Columbus, Ohio	
16	December 5	Ohio State		Columbus, Ohio	
17	December 11	Notre Dame		Ann Arbor, Michigan	
18	December 13	Notre Dame		South Bend, Indiana	
19	December 29	RPI		Detroit, Michigan	
20	December 30	Michigan State or Michigan Tech		Detroit, Michigan	

January: 0-0-0 (Home: 0-0-0; Road: 0-0-0)

Game	Date	Opponent	Score	Location/Attendance	Record
21	January 8	Western Michigan		Kalamazoo, Michigan	
22	January 9	Western Michigan		Ann Arbor, Michigan	
23	January 15	Alaska		Ann Arbor, Michigan	
24	January 16	Alaska		Ann Arbor, Michigan	
25	January 22	Ferris State		Ann Arbor, Michigan	
26	January 23	Ferris State		Big Rapids, Michigan	
27	January 29	Michigan State		East Lansing, Michigan	
28	January 30	Michigan State		Ann Arbor, Michigan	

February: 0-0-0 (Home: 0-0-0; Road: 0-0-0)

Game	Date	Opponent	Score	Location/Attendance	Record
29	February 4	Bowling Green		Bowling Green, Ohio	
30	February 6	Wisconsin		Madison, Wisconsin	
31	February 9	Bowling Green		Ann Arbor, Michigan	
32	February 12	Nebraska-Omaha		Omaha, Nebraska	
33	February 13	Nebraska-Omaha		Omaha, Nebraska	
34	February 19	Northern Michigan		Ann Arbor, Michigan	
35	February 20	Northern Michigan		Ann Arbor, Michigan	
36	February 25	Notre Dame		Ann Arbor, Michigan	
37	February 27	Notre Dame		South Bend, Indiana	

2009–10 Schedule

== See also ==
- 2009 Michigan Wolverines football team
- 2009–10 Michigan Wolverines men's basketball team
