= 2009–10 Bowling Green Falcons men's ice hockey season =

2009-10 hockey season

- Conference: 11th CCHA
- Home ice: BGSU Ice Arena

Rankings
- USA Today/USA Hockey Magazine: –
- USCHO.com/CBS College Sports: –

Record
- Overall: 4–20–4 (2–13–3–2)
- Home: 2–8–1
- Road: 1–12–3
- Neutral: 1–1–0

Coaches and captains
- Head coach: Dennis Williams
- Captain: Kyle Page
- Alternate captain(s): Tommy Dee; David Solway

The 2009–10 Bowling Green Falcons men's ice hockey season was the Falcons' 41st season of varsity hockey and 39th in the Central Collegiate Hockey Association (CCHA). The Falcons finished the year as the eleventh place team in the CCHA and in the first round of the CCHA Hockey Tournament, they lost to the sixth seed Nebraska Omaha. The team was coached by Dennis Williams in his first and only season as the program's head coach.

== Preseason ==
Following the 2008–09 season, the future of the ice hockey program at Bowling Green State University was put into doubt. Blog and the local media began to report that the university was planning on cutting the ice hockey program to save money. The reports were met by much criticism from Bowling Green alumni and residents of Northwest Ohio. In late March 2009, Bowling Green president Dr. Carol A. Cartwright officially announced that a feasibility study of the 43-year-old ice arena and the hockey program would be conducted. Cartwright stated the outline of a plan to decide the future of the BGSU Ice Arena and to explore options facing the University's Intercollegiate Athletics Department. Cartwright has assigned Dr. Edward G. Whipple, BGSU vice president for student affairs, to lead the arena effort and Greg Christopher, director of intercollegiate athletics, to head the athletics review. Bowling Green's hockey program's first head coach, Jack Vivian, was announced as the head of the arena working group, as he was a long-time, national consultant on ice arena operations.

On July 22, 2009, Bowling Green and the Michigan Wolverines announced that they would play a game at the newly opened Lucas County Arena in downtown Toledo, Ohio on November 21.

On July 31, 2009, BGSU announced that it was committing $2.5 million to improvements to BGSU Ice Arena and that another $1.5 million was secured from the state of Ohio by state representative Randy Gardner and state senator Mark Wagoner to assist with renovation plans for the Falcons hockey team's home ice facility. Along with the money committed by BGSU and received from the state of Ohio, the program began to receive donations from supporters and alumni, including $250,000 from Jack and Elaine Vivian and former figure skater and Bowling Green native Scott Hamilton donated $500,000 to endow the Scott Hamilton Hockey Scholarship.

=== Coaching changes ===
Head coach Scott Paluch would resign on June 30, 2009 and took up a position as regional manager for the United States National Developmental Team. In seven seasons as head coach at Bowling Green, Paluch compiled a record of 84–156–23. Paluch's assistant, Dennis Williams was named the interim coach for the 2009–10 season.

=== Players leaving ===
Bowling Green would see many players leave the team during the offseason, starting with sophomore forward Dan Sexton, who signed a professional contract with the Anaheim Ducks. Freshman defenceman Dean Petiot, who had left Bowling Green during the 2008–09 season, signed with the Huntsville Havoc of the Southern Professional Hockey League Sophomore forward Jacob Cepis left Bowling Green and transferred to the University of Minnesota and began his career at Minnesota against Bowling Green on January 2, 2010. Freshman defenceman Nick Bailen withdrew from Bowling Green and re-signed with his junior team, the Indiana Ice of the United States Hockey League.

2009 Exhibition Game Log

1–1–0 (Home: 1–1–0; Road: 0–0–0)
#	Date	Opponent	Score	OT	Decision	Attendance	Record
1	October 3	Wilfrid Laurier	7–3		Eno		1–0–0
2	October 15	US National Team Development Program	7–2		Hammond	1,450	1–1–0

Legend: Win Loss

== Regular season ==
=== Schedule ===
2009–10 Season

October: 0–5–1 (Home: 0–2–0; Road: 0–3–1)
#	Date	Opponent	Score	OT	Decision	Arena	Attendance	CCHA	Pts	Overall	Recap
1†	October 9	@ Minnesota State	3–2		Verizon Wireless Center	3,349	Eno	0–0–0–0	0	0–1–0	L1
2†	October 10	@ Minnesota State	4–1		Verizon Wireless Center	3,546	Hammond	0–0–0–0	0	0–2–0	L2
3†	October 23	Providence	8–2		BGSU Ice Arena	1,575	Eno	0–0–0–0	0	0–3–0	L3
4†	October 24	Providence	3–1		BGSU Ice Arena	1,910	Hammond	0–0–0–0	0	0–4–0	L4
5	October 30	@ #12 Nebraska-Omaha	3–3	SOW	Qwest Center	7,152	Hammond	0–0–1–1	2	0–4–1	SOW1
6	October 31	@ #12 Nebraska-Omaha	3–1		Qwest Center	1,826	Hammond	0–1–1–1	2	0–5–1	L1

November: 2–5–1 (Home: 1–1–0; Road: 1–3–1; Neutral: 0–1–0)
#	Date	Opponent	Score	OT	Decision	Arena	Attendance	CCHA	Pts	Overall	Recap
7	November 6	@ Ferris State	5–1		Ewigleben Arena	1,275	Hammond	0–2–1–1	2	0–6–1	L2
8	November 7	@ Ferris State	3–2		Ewigleben Arena	1,279	Eno	0–3–1–1	2	0–7–1	L3
9	November 13	#9 Alaska	3–1		BGSU Ice Arena	1,759	Eno	1–3–1–1	5	1–7–1	W1
10	November 14	#9 Alaska	5–3		BGSU Ice Arena	1,969	Eno	1–4–1–1	5	1–8–1	L1
11	November 20	@ #16 Michigan	4–2		Yost Ice Arena	6,756	Eno	2–4–1–0	8	2–8–1	W1
12	November 21	vs. #16 Michigan	4–1		Lucas County Arena	4,027	Eno	2–5–1–1	8	2–9–1	L1
13	November 27	@ #14 Notre Dame	2–1	OT	Joyce Center Rink	2,857	Eno	2–6–1–1	8	2–10–1	L2
14	November 28	@ #14 Notre Dame	4–4	SOW	Joyce Center Rink	2,544	Eno	2–6–2–2	10	2–10–2	SOW1

December: 0–4–0 (Home: 0–3–0; Road: 0–1–0)
#	Date	Opponent	Score	OT	Decision	Arena	Attendance	CCHA	Pts	Overall	Recap
15	December 4	Lake Superior State	2–1		BGSU Ice Arena	1,665	Eno	2–7–2–2	10	2–11–1	L1
16	December 5	Lake Superior State	5–2		BGSU Ice Arena	1,536	Eno	2–8–2–2	10	2–12–2	L2
17	December 11	#13 Michigan State	3–2	OT	BGSU Ice Arena	1,990	Eno	2–9–2–2	10	2–13–2	L3
18	December 12	@ #13 Michigan State	4–1		Munn Ice Arena	4,116	Hammond	2–10–2–2	10	2–14–2	L4

January: 2–4–2 (Home: 1–0–1; Road: 0–3–1; Neutral: 1–1–0)
#	Date	Opponent	Score	OT	Decision	Arena	Attendance	CCHA	Pts	Overall	Recap
19†^	January 2	@ Minnesota	3–1		Mariucci Arena	9,712	Hammond	2–10–2–2	10	2–15–2	L5
20†^	January 3	vs. Clarkson	4–3		Mariucci Arena	1,321	Eno	2–10–2–2	10	3–15–2	W1
21	January 8	@ Ohio State	7–2		Value City Arena	3,236	Eno	2–11–2–2	10	3–16–2	L1
22	January 9	@ Ohio State	4–3		Value City Arena	4,590	Hammond	2–12–2–2	10	3–17–2	L2
23	January 15	@ Northern Michigan	6–0		Berry Events Center	2,857	Hammond	2–13–2–2	10	3–18–2	L3
24	January 16	@ Northern Michigan	3–3	SOL	Berry Events Center	3,052	Eno	2–13–3–2	11	3–18–3	SOL1
25	January 22	Western Michigan	4–4	SOW	BGSU Ice Arena	2,121	Eno	2–13–4–3	13	3–18–4	SOW1
26	January 23	Western Michigan	3–2		BGSU Ice Arena	2,195	Eno	3–13–4–3	16	4–18–4	W1

February: 1–5–2 (Home: 1–3–2; Road: 0–2–0)
#	Date	Opponent	Score	OT	Decision	Arena	Attendance	CCHA	Pts	Overall	Recap
27	February 4	Michigan	2–1		BGSU Ice Arena	2,453	Eno	3–14–4–3	16	4–19–4	L1
28	February 9	@ Michigan	4–0		Yost Ice Arena	5,968	Hammond	3–15–4–3	16	4–20–4	L2
29	February 12	Miami (Ohio)	3–2		BGSU Ice Arena	2,339	Hammond	3–16–4–3	16	4–21–4	L3
30	February 13	Miami (Ohio)	10–2		BGSU Ice Arena	2,558	Hammond	3–17–4–3	16	4–22–4	L4
31	February 19	Notre Dame	4–3		BGSU Ice Arena	2,084	Eno	4–17–4–3	19	5–22–4	W1
32	February 20	Notre Dame	1–1	SOW	BGSU Ice Arena	2,746	Eno	4–17–5–4	21	5–22–5	SOW1
33	February 26	@ Michigan State	5–2		Munn Ice Arena	6,368	Eno	4–18–5–4	21	5–23–5	L1
34	February 27	Michigan State	2–2	SOW	Munn Ice Arena	3,027	Hammond	4–18–6–5	23	5–23–6	SOW1

Legend: Win/Overtime Win (3 points) Tie / Shootout Win (CCHA only) (2 points) Tie / Shootout Loss (CCHA only) (1 point) Loss (0 points) † Non-conference Game ^ Dodge Holiday Classic Game

Note: Points only applicable for conference games. The CCHA record is defined as W–L–T-SOW.
Source: 2009–10 BGSU Hockey Schedule

=== Standings ===
2009–10 Central Collegiate Hockey Association standings
	Conference								Overall					
	GP	W	L	T	SW	PTS	GF	GA	GP	W	L	T	GF	GA
#3 Miami†	28	21	2	5	2	70	100	39	44	29	8	7	147	86
Michigan State	28	14	8	6	2	50	73	64	38	19	13	6	115	97
#14 Ferris State	28	13	9	6	4	49	79	66	40	21	13	6	118	92
#13 Northern Michigan	28	13	9	6	3	48	86	72	41	20	13	8	124	104
#15 Alaska	28	0^	28^	0^	0^	45	73	70	39	0^	39^	0^	108	93
Nebraska–Omaha	28	13	12	3	2	44	85	83	42	20	16	6	124	116
#8 Michigan*	28	14	13	1	0	43	83	69	45	26	18	1	148	102
Ohio State	28	10	12	6	4	40	81	93	39	15	18	6	110	122
Notre Dame	28	9	12	7	2	36	65	76	38	13	17	8	90	102
Lake Superior State	28	10	15	3	2	35	66	90	38	15	18	5	93	118
Bowling Green	28	4	18	6	5	23	58	102	36	5	25	6	71	138
Western Michigan	28	4	17	7	2	21	62	87	36	8	20	8	76	104
Championship: Michigan † indicates conference regular season champion * indicates conference tournament champion Final rankings: USA Today/USA Hockey Magazine Top 15 Poll^ Alaska was retroactively required to forfeit all wins and ties due to player ineligibilities.

== Playoffs ==
2010 CCHA Men's Ice Hockey Tournament

First Round vs. (6) Nebraska–Omaha – Nebraska–Omaha won series 2–0
Game	Date	Opponent	Score	OT	Decision	Arena	Attendance	Series	Recap
1	March 5	Nebraska–Omaha	6–1		Hammond	Qwest Center	4,779	0–1	L1
2	March 6	Nebraska–Omaha	6–1		Eno	Qwest Center	6,417	0–2	L2

Legend: Win Loss

== Roster ==
Goaltenders
#	State	Player	Catches	Year	Hometown	Previous Team
1	(British Columbia)	Andrew Hammond	L	Freshman	Surrey, British Columbia	Vernon (BCHL)
30	(Massachusetts)	Phil Greer	L	Senior	Franklin, Massachusetts	Santa Fe (NAHL)
31	(Michigan)	Nick Eno (BUF)	L	Junior	Howell, Michigan	Green Mtn. (EJHL)

Defensemen
#	State	Player	Shoots	Year	Hometown	Previous Team
2	(Minnesota)	Ryan Peltoma	R	Freshman	Brainerd, Minnesota	North Iowa (NAHL)
3	(Indiana)	Brian Moore	R	Senior	Carmel, Indiana	Bozeman (NAHL)
4	(Michigan)	Kyle Page (C)	L	Senior	Wixom, Michigan	Indiana (USHL)
8	(Michigan)	Ian Ruel	L	Freshman	Ann Arbor, Michigan	Omaha (USHL)
15	(Ontario)	Andrew Krelove	R	Junior	Thunder Bay, Ontario	Des Moines (USHL)
23	(Michigan)	Max Grover	R	Freshman	Kentwood, Michigan	Sioux Falls (USHL)
25	(Washington (state))	Reed Rushing	R	Freshman	Seattle, Washington	Marquette (NAHL)
28	(Michigan)	Robert Shea	R	Freshman	Harrison Township, Michigan	Green Bay Gamblers (USHL)

Forwards
#	State	Player	Shoots	Year	Hometown	Previous Team
5	(Wisconsin)	David Solway (A)	L	Junior	Green Bay, Wisconsin	Sioux Falls (USHL)
6	(Michigan)	Jerry Freismuth	L	Freshman	Grosse Pointe Woods, Michigan	Alexandria (NAHL)
7	(Alberta)	James Perkin	L	Senior	Calgary, Alberta	Lincoln (USHL)
10	(Illinois)	Marc Rodriguez	R	Freshman	Aurora, Illinois	Sioux Falls (USHL)
11	(Ontario)	Wade Finegan	R	Junior	Toronto, Ontario	Georgetown (OPJHL)
13	(Quebec)	Nathan Pageau	L	Freshman	Gatineau, Quebec	Hamilton (OJHL)
14	(North Carolina)	Kai Kantola	R	Senior	Raleigh, North Carolina	Fargo-Moorhead (NAHL)
17	(Ontario)	James McIntosh	L	Sophomore	Holland Landing, Ontario	Stouffville (OPJHL)
18	(Slovakia)	Tomas Petruska	R	Senior	Prešov, Slovakia	Cleveland (NAHL)
20	(Ontario)	Cameron Sinclair	L	Sophomore	Windsor, Ontario	Surrey (BCHL)
21	(Connecticut)	Jordan Samuels-Thomas (ATL)	L	Freshman	Windsor, Connecticut	Waterloo (USHL)
22	(Minnesota)	Brennan Vargas	L	Sophomore	Coon Rapids, Minnesota	Burnaby (BCHL)
26	(Ohio)	Josh Boyd	L	Senior	Columbus, Ohio	Portage (MJHL)
27	(Minnesota)	Tommy Dee (A)	R	Senior	Maple Grove, Minnesota	Bismarck (NAHL)

== Player stats ==
=== Skaters ===
Note: Pos = Position; GP = Games played; G = Goals; A = Assists; Pts = Points; PIM = Penalty minutes; +/- = Plus/minus; PPG = Power-play goals; SHG = Short-handed goals; GWG = Game-winning goals

Regular Season
Player	GP	G	A	Pts	+/-	PIM
Jordan Samuels-Thomas	33	11	13	24	−3	28
Tomas Petruska	34	9	14	23	−7	30
David Solway	32	5	13	18	−14	50
Kyle Page	34	3	14	17	−18	30
Tommy Dee	33	8	7	15	−19	64
James Perkin	31	4	8	12	−10	57
Kai Kantola	33	5	6	11	−6	44
Josh Boyd	33	6	5	11	−8	14
Nathan Pageau	30	4	7	11	−10	20
Brennan Vargas	27	3	3	6	−6	8
Ian Ruel	32	2	4	6	−5	48
Cameron Sinclair	23	2	4	6	4	6
Marc Rodriguez	32	3	2	5	−11	16
Wade Finegan	27	2	2	4	−9	26
James McIntosh	20	1	3	4	−3	29
Andrew Krelove	34	0	4	4	−14	32
Max Grover	26	0	3	3	−13	55
Reed Rushing	26	0	2	2	−4	0
Bryan Potacco	11	1	0	1	1	2
Nick Eno	27	0	1	1	0	2
Jerry Freismuth	15	0	1	1	−4	10
Brian Moore	10	0	1	1	−6	14
Ryan Peltoma	21	0	1	1	−4	10
Robert Shea	17	0	0	0	3	51
Totals	34	69	118	187	−166	646

Playoffs
Player	GP	G	A	Pts	+/-	PIM
Tomas Petruska	2	1	0	1	0	0
Brennan Vargas	2	1	0	1	−2	0
Jordan Samuels-Thomas	2	0	1	1	0	2
James Perkin	2	0	1	1	−1	2
Kai Kantola	2	0	1	1	−3	0
David Solway	2	0	0	0	−1	2
Kyle Page	2	0	0	0	−2	0
Tommy Dee	2	0	0	0	−1	4
Josh Boyd	2	0	0	0	−2	0
Nathan Pageau	2	0	0	0	0	0
Ian Ruel	2	0	0	0	−2	2
Marc Rodriguez	2	0	0	0	−2	4
Wade Finegan	2	0	0	0	−4	2
Andrew Krelove	2	0	0	0	−5	4
Ryan Peltoma	2	0	0	0	−1	4
Robert Shea	2	0	0	0	0	4
Max Grover	1	0	0	0	−1	0
Cameron Sinclair	1	0	0	0	−2	0
Reed Rushing	1	0	0	0	−1	0
James McIntosh	1	0	0	0	−2	0
Totals	2	2	3	5	−32	30

Source: 2009–10 BGSU Individual Statistics

=== Goaltenders ===
Note: Pos = Position;GP = Games played; Min, TOI = Minutes played; W = Wins; L = Losses; T,T/OT = Ties; OTL = Overtime losses; GA = Goals-against; GAA = Goals-against average; SO = Shutouts; SA = Shots against; SV = Shots saved; SV% = Save percentage;

Regular Season
Player	GP	GS	TOI	W	L	T	GA	GAA	SA	SV%	SO
Nick Eno	30	22	1343:28	5	12	4	74	3.30	637	.896	0
Andrew Hammond	19	12	836:43	0	12	2	60	4.30	442	.880	0
Phil Greer	2	0	5:31	0	0	0	1	10.88	1	.500	0
Totals		34	2185:42	5	24	6	135	3.71	1080	.889	0

Playoffs
Player	GP	GS	TOI	W	L	OT	GA	GAA	SA	SV%	SO
Nick Eno	2	1	74:04	0	1	0	6	4.86	38	.864	0
Andrew Hammond	2	1	42:37	0	1	0	6	8.45	31	.838	0
Phil Greer	1	0	3:19	0	0	0	0	0.00	0	–	0
Totals		2	120:00	0	2	0	12	6.00	69	.852	0

Source: 2009–10 BGSU Individual Statistics

== See also ==
- 2009–10 NCAA Division I men's ice hockey season
