= 2009–10 Big Ten Conference men's basketball season =

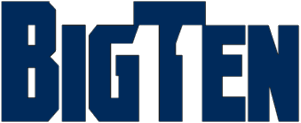
- League: NCAA Division I
- Sport: Basketball
- Duration: December 29, 2009 – March 7, 2010
- Teams: 11
- Total attendance: 2,360,966
- Average attendance: 12,591
- TV partner(s): Big Ten Network, ESPN, CBS

2009–10 NCAA Division I season
- Co-Champions: Michigan State (14–4); Ohio State (14–4); Purdue (14–4)
- Runners-Up: Wisconsin (13–5)
- Season MVP: Evan Turner

Tournament
- Venue: Conseco Fieldhouse, Indianapolis, Indiana
- Champions: Ohio State
- Runners-up: Minnesota
- Finals MVP: Evan Turner

Basketball seasons
- 2008–09 2010–11

2009–10 Big Ten Conference men's basketball standings
	Conf.				Overall
Team	W		L	PCT	W		L	PCT
No. 5 Ohio State†	14	–	4	.778	29	–	8	.784
No. 10 Purdue	14	–	4	.778	29	–	6	.829
No. 13 Michigan State	14	–	4	.778	28	–	9	.757
No. 16 Wisconsin	13	–	5	.722	24	–	9	.727
Illinois	10	–	8	.556	21	–	15	.583
Minnesota	9	–	9	.500	21	–	14	.600
Northwestern	7	–	11	.389	20	–	14	.588
Michigan	7	–	11	.389	15	–	17	.469
Indiana	4	–	14	.222	10	–	21	.323
Iowa	4	–	14	.222	10	–	22	.313
Penn State	3	–	15	.167	11	–	20	.355
† 2010 Big Ten tournament winner As of April 3, 2010; Rankings from AP Poll

The 2009–10 Big Ten Conference men's basketball season marked the continuation of competitive basketball among Big Ten Conference members that began in 1904. On October 16, 2009, five schools celebrated Midnight Madness to mark the beginning of the 2009–10 NCAA Division I men's basketball season.

Michigan State, Ohio State, and Purdue ended the season tied for the conference championship with win–loss records of 14–4, followed by Wisconsin at 13–5. In the 2010 Big Ten Conference men's basketball tournament, Ohio State defeated Minnesota for the championship, and the conference named Evan Turner as the tournament's most outstanding player. The conference earned five bids to the 2010 NCAA Men's Division I Basketball Tournament by the Co-Champions, runner-up and tournament runner-up. Big Ten teams posted a 9–5 overall record including three Sweet Sixteen appearances and one Final Four appearance. Two members of the conference received invitations to play in the 2010 National Invitation Tournament (NIT), in which they posted a 2–2 record.

2010 Big Ten Conference Men's Basketball Player of the Year Evan Turner received multiple first team 2010 NCAA Men's Basketball All-Americans and National Player of the Year recognitions. Trévon Hughes, E'Twaun Moore, Kalin Lucas and Robbie Hummel also received various All-American recognitions. Moore was also recognized as an Academic All-American.

== Preseason ==
On October 16, 2009 Illinois, Indiana, Michigan State, Michigan, and Minnesota celebrated Midnight Madness, and several other schools celebrated it in the subsequent days. Michigan State, Purdue and Michigan were ranked in the top 25 by all preseason polls. The entire 2008–09 All-Big Ten Conference first-team returned: Manny Harris MICH; Kalin Lucas MSU; Evan Turner OSU; Talor Battle PSU; and JaJuan Johnson PUR. The 24-member Big Ten media panel selected Lucas as the preseason conference player of the year, and he was joined on the first team preseason All-Big Ten team by Harris, Turner, Battle and Robbie Hummel PUR. The same media panel selected Michigan State as the preseason conference favorite followed by Purdue and Ohio State.

Various publications released their preseason predictions for conference standings and All-Big Ten teams.

Predicted Big-Ten Results

	Athlon	Lindy's	Sporting News	Blue Ribbon Yearbook	Big Ten Media	Yahoo! Sports
1.	Michigan State	Michigan State	Michigan State	Michigan State	Michigan State	Michigan State
2.	Purdue	Purdue	Purdue	Purdue	Purdue	Purdue
3.	Michigan	Michigan	Ohio State	Minnesota	Ohio State	Ohio State
4.	Ohio State	Ohio State	Illinois	Ohio State		Michigan
5.	Illinois	Illinois	Michigan	Michigan		Illinois
6.	Minnesota	Minnesota	Minnesota	Illinois		Minnesota
7.	Wisconsin	Wisconsin	Northwestern	Wisconsin		Wisconsin
8.	Northwestern	Northwestern	Wisconsin	Penn State		Northwestern
9.	Penn State	Penn State	Penn State	Northwestern		Penn State
10.	Indiana	Indiana	Indiana	Indiana		Indiana
11.	Iowa	Iowa	Iowa	Iowa		Iowa

- Big Ten Media select only the top three teams

Pre-Season All-Big Ten Teams

Big Ten Media	Athlon	Lindy's	Sporting News	Blue Ribbon Yearbook	Yahoo! Sports
Talor Battle PSU; Manny Harris MICH; Robbie Hummel PUR; Kalin Lucas MSU; Evan Turner OSU	Talor Battle PSU; Manny Harris MICH; Robbie Hummel PUR; Kalin Lucas MSU; Evan Turner OSU	Talor Battle PSU; Manny Harris MICH; Kalin Lucas MSU; E'Twaun Moore; Evan Turner OSU	Manny Harris MICH; Robbie Hummel PUR; Kevin Coble NU; Kalin Lucas MSU; Evan Turner OSU	Kalin Lucas MSU; Manny Harris MICH; Evan Turner OSU; Robbie Hummel PUR; JaJuan Johnson PUR	Kalin Lucas MSU; Manny Harris MICH; Evan Turner OSU; Robbie Hummel PUR; JaJuan Johnson PUR

Preseason national polls

	Associated Press	USA TODAY/ESPN Coaches	Athlon	Lindy's	Sporting News	Fox Sports	CBS Sports	SI.com	Sports Illustrated	Rivals.com
Illinois	23			25	21	18	23			24
Indiana										
Iowa										
Michigan	15	15	23	9	24	16	19	16	15	14
Michigan State	2	2	2	3	3	4	3	2	2	3
Minnesota	25	18				20	16			
Northwestern										
Ohio State	16	17		22	19	15	18	15	16	13
Penn State										
Purdue	7	7	4	6	7	10	8	7	6	5
Wisconsin										

=== Preseason watch lists ===
On August 19, 2009, the Wooden Award preseason watch list included eight Big Ten players. The watch list was composed of 50 players who were not transfers, freshmen or medical redshirts. The list will be reduced to a 30-player mid-season watch list in December and a final national ballot of about 20 players in March. On October 29, the Naismith College Player of the Year watch list of 50 players was announced. In late February, a shorter list of the Top 30 was compiled in preparation for a March vote to narrow the list to the four finalists.

	Wooden	Naismith
Talor Battle	✓	✓
Manny Harris	✓	✓
Robbie Hummel	✓	✓
Kalin Lucas	✓	✓
E'Twaun Moore	✓	
Raymar Morgan	✓	
DeShawn Sims	✓	
Evan Turner	✓	✓

== Player of the week ==
=== In season honors ===
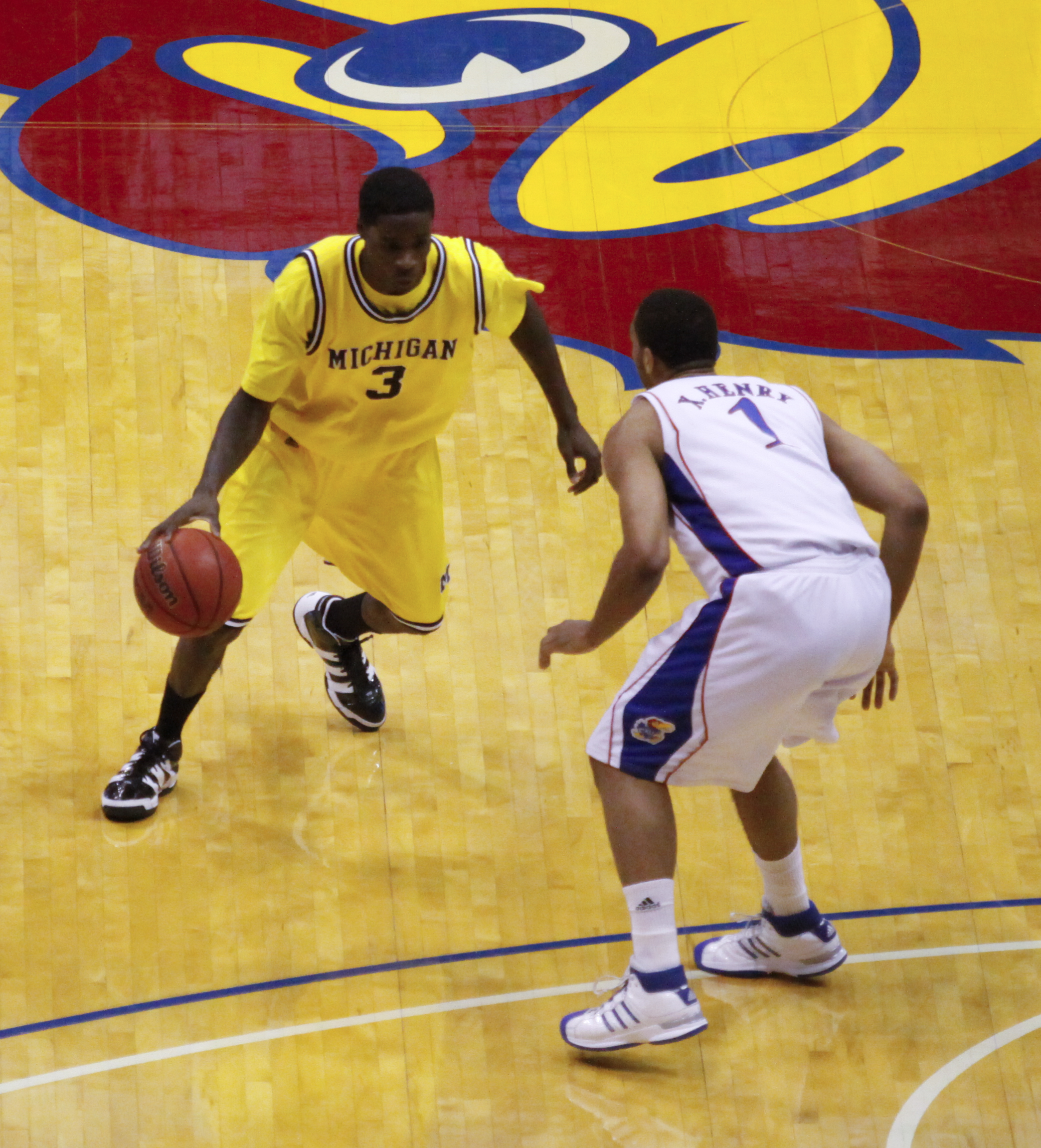
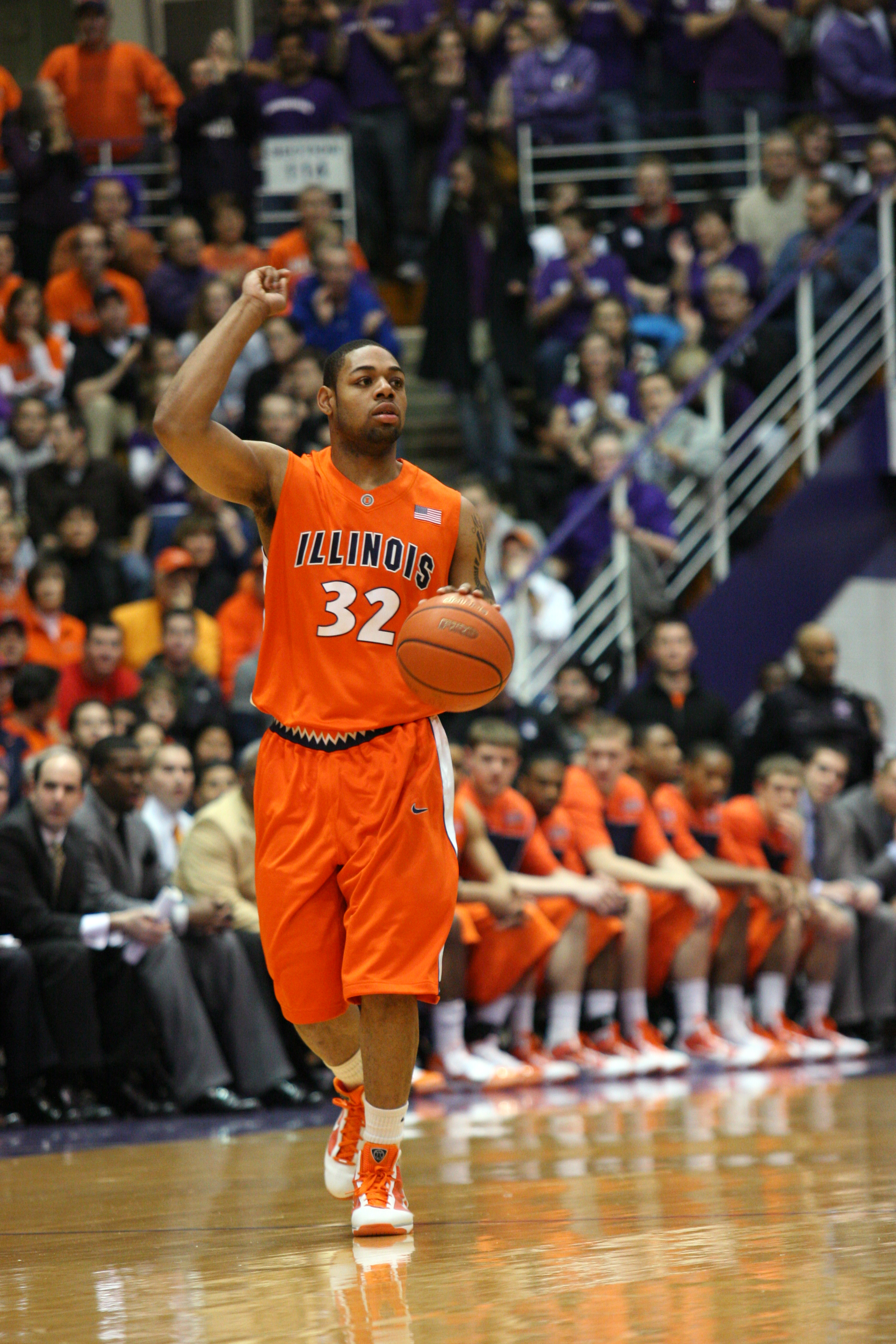
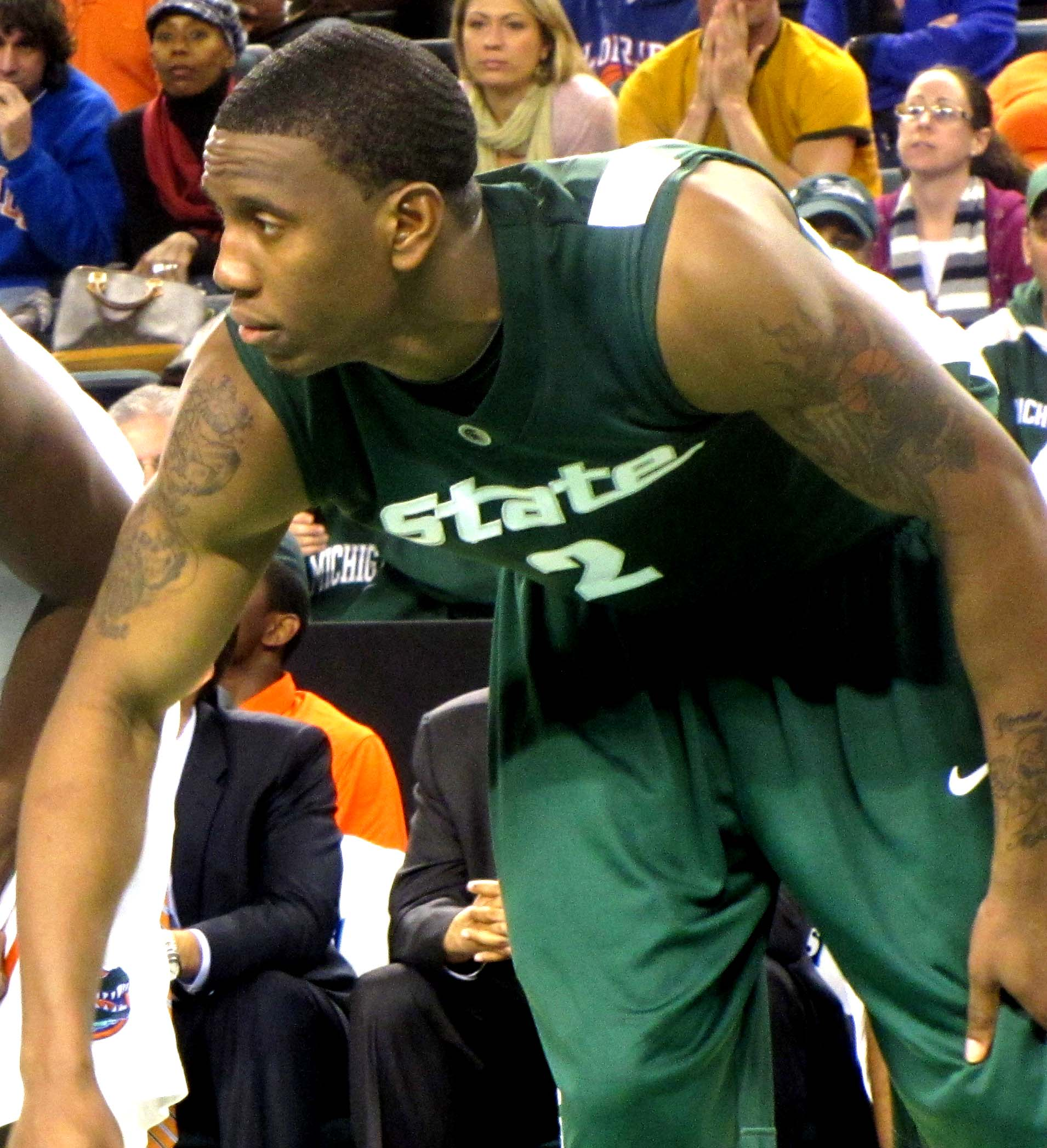
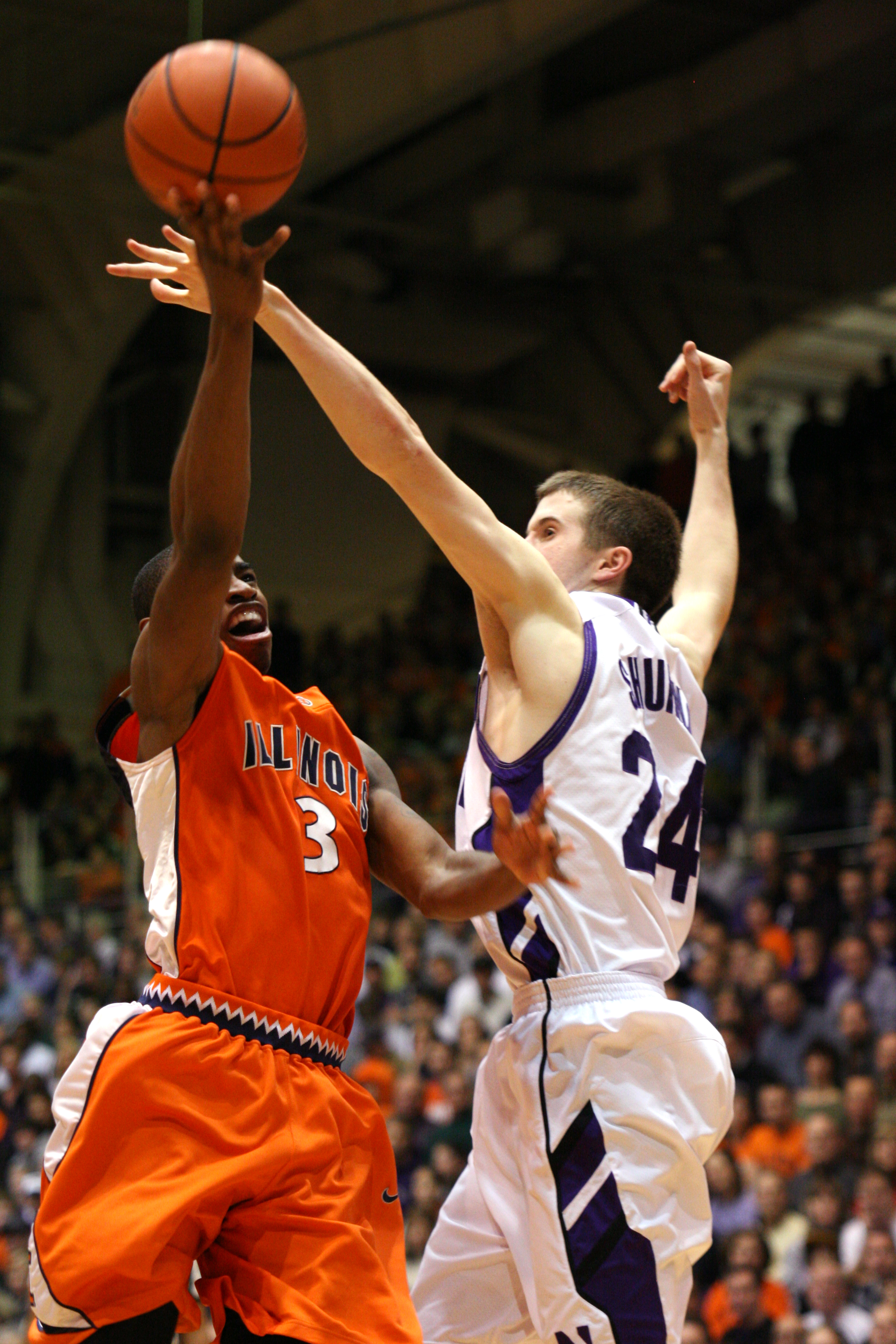
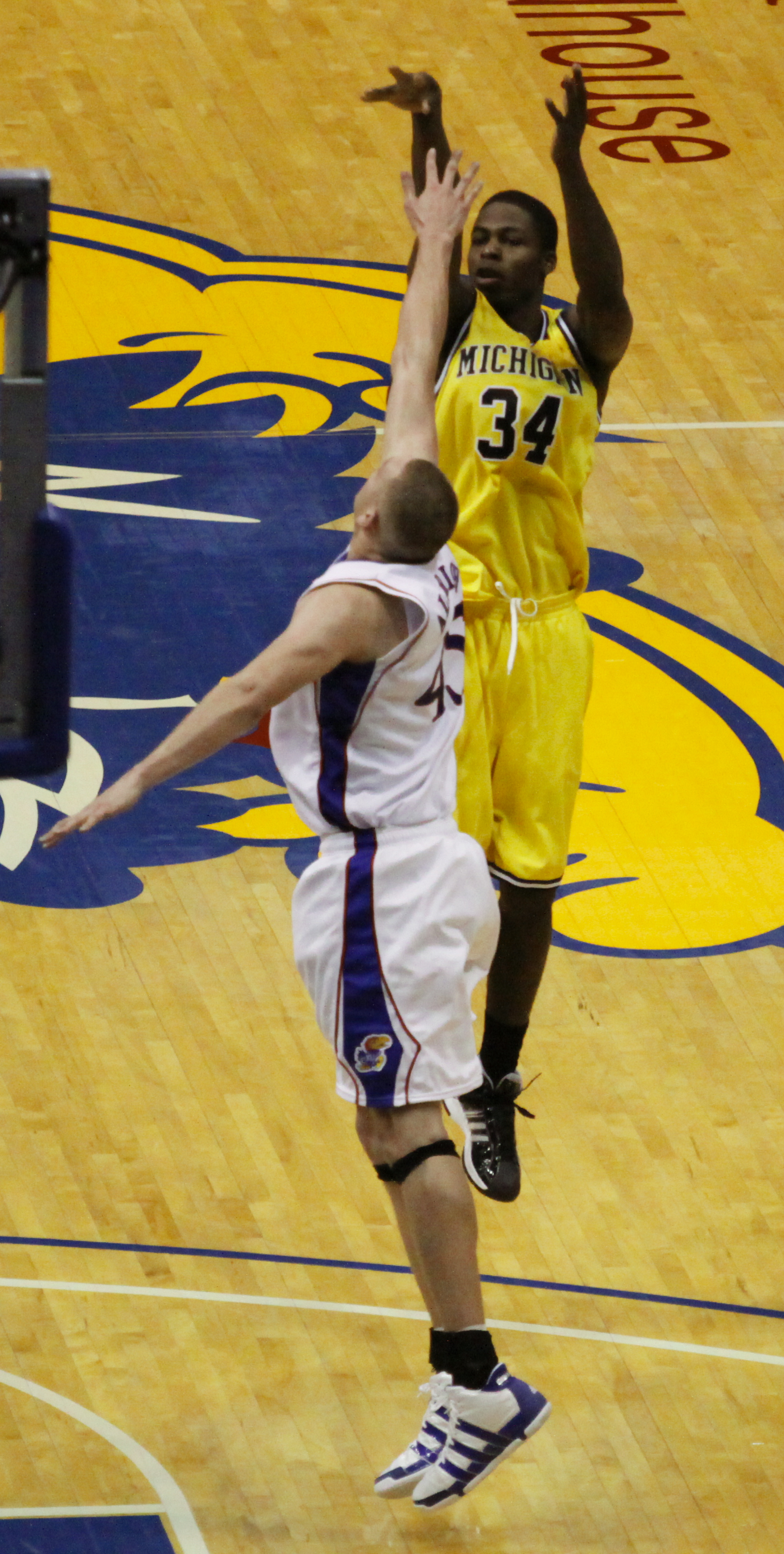
Players of the week included (left to right) Manny Harris (guarded by Xavier Henry), Demetri McCamey, Raymar Morgan, John Shurna (defending Brandon Paul) and DeShawn Sims (shooting over Cole Aldrich.)

Players of the week

Throughout the conference regular season, the Big Ten offices named a player of the week each Monday.

Week	Player of the week
11–16–09	Manny Harris, MICH
11–16–09	Evan Turner, OSU
11–23–09	Evan Turner (2), OSU
11–30–09	John Shurna, NU
11–30–09	Evan Turner (3), OSU
12–07–09	Trevon Hughes, WIS
12–14–09	Drew Crawford, NU
12–21–09	Blake Hoffarber, MINN
12–28–09	David Lighty, OSU
01–04–10	John Shurna (2), NU
01–11–10	DeShawn Sims, MICH
01–18–10	Evan Turner (4), OSU
01–25–10	JaJuan Johnson, PUR
02–01–10	Durrell Summers, MSU
02–08–10	Demetri McCamey, ILL
02–08–10	Evan Turner (5), OSU
02–15–10	JaJuan Johnson (2), PUR
02–22–10	Evan Turner (6), OSU
03–01–10	Raymar Morgan, MSU
03–01–10	Evan Turner (7), OSU
03–08–10	Jon Leuer, WIS

== Regular season ==
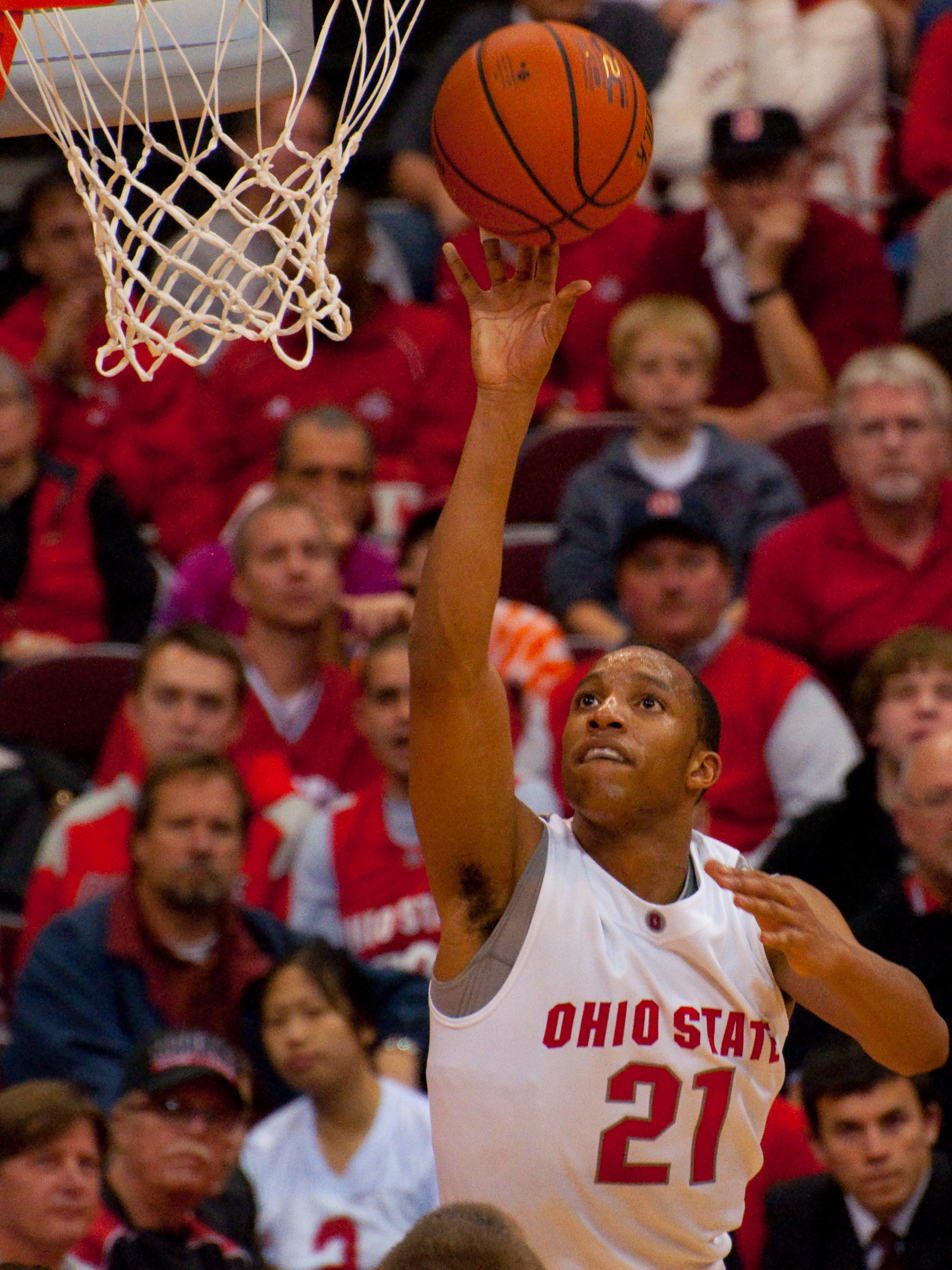
National Player of the Year Evan Turner of Ohio State set new Big Ten records for number of career and single season Player of the Week awards during the 2009–10 Big Ten Conference men's basketball season.

November

The season opened with the Big Ten Conference holding the leadership with six teams ranked among the preseason top 25 in both the AP Poll and the Coaches' Poll, setting a new conference record for the most teams ranked to open a season. The season also opened with the entire 2008–09 first team All-Big Ten players returning. Both Manny Harris (November 14) and Evan Turner (November 9) recorded triple doubles in the opening week of the season marking the first times a Big Ten player has accomplished the feat since January 13, 2001. Six of the eleven conference teams started at least one freshman. The following week, three schools (Michigan State, Illinois and Iowa) participated in ESPN's Tuesday, November 17 24-hour hoops marathon across its family of networks (ESPN, ESPN2, ESPNU & ESPN360). Michigan State's Magic Johnson and Jud Heathcote were inducted into the National Collegiate Basketball Hall of Fame on November 22. With his 341st victory, Tom Izzo became Michigan State's all-time leader in basketball coaching victories. Turner became the second player in conference history to be named conference player of the week three weeks in a row. On November 28, both Ohio State and Michigan State scored 100 points, marking the first time two conference teams have done so since December 22, 1997.

December

For the second time in the season, two teams scored 100 points on the same night on December 5. For the first time in eleven attempts, the Big Ten won the ACC – Big Ten Challenge. In his 275th game, Bo Ryan reached the 200-win milestone with Wisconsin Badgers men's basketball. In the same week, Tom Crean raised his record to 200-–125. The Big Ten entered intraconference play tied with the Big East Conference by having five ranked teams. Northwestern entered conference play on its longest winning streak in 16 years (9), and Purdue reached the 11–0 mark for the second time and had a perfect record at the end of December for the first time since the 1936–37 season.

January

Purdue ran its record to 14–0 to start the season, which tied the Glenn Robinson-led 1993–94 Purdue Boilermakers for the best start in school history. Four Big Ten athletes (Talor Battle, Harris, Trevon Hughes and Lucas) were named as finalists for the 2010 Bob Cousy Award to lead all conferences. Harris, Lucas, Robbie Hummel and Turner were also selected Midseason Top 30 finalists for the 2010 John Wooden Award. On January 12, Hummel and Turner became only the third pair of opposing Big Ten players to post 30 points against each other in one night. Michigan State established a new school record by winning its first eight conference games and extended the streak to nine by the end of the month.

February

On February 8 Turner recorded his fifth Conference Player of the Week award and eighth of his career surpassing the former conference record held by Glenn Robinson and Jim Jackson, who each had seven career and tied Robinson's single-season record with five. Two weeks later he set the single-season record with his sixth recognition when he averaged 24.5 points, 8.5 rebounds and 5.5 assists against two ranked opponents (No. 4 Purdue and at No. 11 Michigan State). Three Big Ten players made the February Top 30 midseason Naismith College Player of the Year watch list: Hummel, Lucas and Turner. Hummel and Turner were selected among the 16 finalists for the 2010 Oscar Robertson Trophy.

March

Turner was selected as one of six finalists for the Bob Cousy Award. Lucas, Hummel and Turner were included on the final 26-man ballot for the Wooden Award.

The Big Ten led the nation in average attendance with 12,591. Other top-5 conferences were SEC (11,770), Big 12 (11,214), Big East (11,014) and ACC (10,713). 334 Division I schools competed in basketball and the Big Ten had several of the top schools in attendances: Wisconsin (6th, 17,230), Indiana (11th 15,296), Illinois (12th, 14,870), Michigan State (13th, 15,759), Ohio State (16th, 14,181) and Purdue (20th 13,681).

== Rankings ==
During the season, seven of the Big Ten teams received enough votes to be ranked and an eight team received voted during several weekly polls. Michigan State and Purdue were ranked during every weekly poll during the season.

Legend
	Improvement in ranking
	Drop in ranking
	Not ranked previous week
RV	Received votes but were not ranked in Top 25 of poll

		Pre	Wk 1	Wk 2	Wk 3	Wk 4	Wk 5	Wk 6	Wk 7	Wk 8	Wk 9	Wk 10	Wk 11	Wk 12	Wk 13	Wk 14	Wk 15	Wk 16	Wk 17	Wk 18	Final
Illinois	AP	23	23	20	RV	RV	RV								RV	RV	RV	RV			
Illinois	C	RV	25	21	RV	RV	RV	RV	RV							RV					
Indiana	AP																				
Indiana	C																				
Iowa	AP																				
Iowa	C																				
Michigan	AP	15	15т	15	RV																
Michigan	C	15	16	15	RV							RV									
Michigan State	AP	2	2	2	9	12	12	9	11	10	7	6	5	5	10	11	14	11	11	13	
Michigan State	C	2	2	2	9	14	12	9	11	11	8	7	5	5	10	11	14	12	11	12	4
Minnesota	AP	25	24	22	RV	RV	RV			RV											
Minnesota	C	18	18	16т	RV				RV		RV									RV	
Northwestern	AP				RV	RV	RV	RV	25			RV	RV								
Northwestern	C					RV	RV	RV	RV												
Ohio State	AP	16	15т	17	15	13	18	17	15	RV		21	20	13	13	9	9	6	5	5	
Ohio State	C	17	15	18	15	15	18	17	15	RV		25	24	18	16	12	9	7	7	6	11
Penn State	AP																				
Penn State	C																				
Purdue	AP	7	7	6	4	5	4	4	4	4	6	13	10	8	6	4	3	7	6	10	
Purdue	C	7	7	6	6	5	4	4	4	4	6	15	12	7	6	4	3	6	5	11	12
Wisconsin	AP				RV	20	RV	RV	23	17	13	18	16	16	11	14	17	15	13	16	
Wisconsin	C				RV	23	RV	RV	RV	20	16	19	16	16	13	16	19	17	18	19	24

== Preconference ==
=== Tournaments ===
Big Ten teams emerged victorious in the following tournament:

Name	Dates	Num. teams	Champions
Paradise Jam tournament	Nov. 20–23	8	Purdue

*Although these tournaments include more teams, only 4 play for the championship.

=== ACC–Big Ten Challenge ===
The Big Ten Conference won the 11th annual ACC – Big Ten Challenge for the first time in the challenge's history.

ACC Team	Big Ten Team	Location	Attendance	Winner	Challenge Leader
Virginia	Penn State	John Paul Jones Arena • Charlottesville, VA	8,898	Penn State (69–66)	Big Ten (1–0)
Wake Forest	#4 Purdue	Mackey Arena • West Lafayette, IN	14,123	Purdue (69–58)	Big Ten (2–0)
NC State	Northwestern	RBC Center • Raleigh, NC	11,913	Northwestern (65–53)	Big Ten (3–0)
Maryland	Indiana	Assembly Hall • Bloomington, IN	17,039	Maryland (80–68)	Big Ten (3–1)
#10 North Carolina	#9 Michigan State	Dean Smith Center • Chapel Hill, NC	21,346	North Carolina (89–82)	Big Ten (3–2)
Virginia Tech	Iowa	Carver-Hawkeye Arena • Iowa City, IA	8,755	Virginia Tech (70–64)	Tied (3–3)
#18 Clemson	Illinois	Littlejohn Coliseum • Clemson, SC	10,000	Illinois (76–74)	Big Ten (4–3)
Miami	Minnesota	BankUnited Center • Coral Gables, FL	5,157	Miami (63–58)	Tied (4–4)
Boston College	Michigan	Crisler Arena • Ann Arbor, MI	10,718	Boston College (62–58)	ACC (5–4)
#6 Duke	Wisconsin	Kohl Center • Madison, WI	17,230	Wisconsin (73–69)	Tied (5–5)
Florida State	#15 Ohio State	Jerome Schottenstein Center • Columbus, OH	13,514	Ohio State (77–64)	Big Ten (6–5)

== Conference play ==
The 2009–10 season marked the third consecutive year that every Big Ten men's basketball conference regular-season and tournament game was nationally televised. In excess of 100 games appeared nationally on CBS, ESPN, ESPN2 or the Big Ten Network every Tuesday, Wednesday, Thursday, Saturday and Sunday during conference play beginning on December 29. All ten games of the March 11 – 14, 2010 Big Ten Conference men's basketball tournament were nationally televised.

With an eighteen-game in-conference schedule, each team met eight teams twice (home and away) and the two other teams only once. The following were the one-time meetings for this season.

Team	One-game Opponent(H)	One-game Opponent(A)
ILLINOIS	Minnesota	at Michigan
INDIANA	Michigan State	at Penn State
IOWA	Penn State	at Wisconsin
MICHIGAN	Illinois	at Purdue
MICHIGAN STATE	Ohio State	at Indiana
MINNESOTA	Wisconsin	at Illinois
NORTHWESTERN	Purdue	at Ohio State
OHIO STATE	Northwestern	at Michigan State
PENN STATE	Indiana	at Iowa
PURDUE	Michigan	at Northwestern
WISCONSIN	Iowa	at Minnesota

== Conference honors ==
Two sets of conference award winners were recognized by the Big Ten - one selected by league coaches and one selected by the media.

Honor	Coaches	Media
Player of the Year	Evan Turner, OSU	Evan Turner, OSU
Coach of the Year	Matt Painter, PUR	Thad Matta, OSU
Freshman of the Year	D.J. Richardson, ILL	Drew Crawford, NU
Defensive Player of the Year	Chris Kramer, PUR	None Selected
Sixth Man of the Year	Draymond Green, MSU	None Selected
All Big Ten First Team	Kalin Lucas, MSU	Kalin Lucas, MSU
All Big Ten First Team	Evan Turner, OSU	Evan Turner, OSU
All Big Ten First Team	Demetri McCamey, ILL	Demetri McCamey, ILL
All Big Ten First Team	E'Twaun Moore, PUR	E'Twaun Moore, PUR
All Big Ten First Team	Robbie Hummel, PUR	Robbie Hummel, PUR
All Big Ten Second Team	DeShawn Sims, MICH	DeShawn Sims, MICH
All Big Ten Second Team	Talor Battle, PSU	Talor Battle, PSU
All Big Ten Second Team	JaJuan Johnson, PUR	JaJuan Johnson, PUR
All Big Ten Second Team	Trévon Hughes, WIS	Trévon Hughes, WIS
All Big Ten Second Team	John Shurna, NU	John Shurna, NU
All Big Ten Third Team	Manny Harris, MICH	Manny Harris, MICH
All Big Ten Third Team	Raymar Morgan, MSU	David Lighty, OSU
All Big Ten Third Team	William Buford, OSU	William Buford, OSU
All Big Ten Third Team	Draymond Green, MSU	Draymond Green, MSU
All Big Ten Third Team	Jason Bohannon, WIS	Jason Bohannon, WIS
All Big Ten Honorable Mention	Mike Tisdale, ILL	Mike Tisdale, ILL
All Big Ten Honorable Mention	Lawrence Westbrook, MINN	Lawrence Westbrook, MINN
All Big Ten Honorable Mention	Michael Thompson, NU	Michael Thompson, NU
All Big Ten Honorable Mention	Jon Diebler, OSU	Jon Diebler, OSU
All Big Ten Honorable Mention	Chris Kramer, PUR	Chris Kramer, PUR
All Big Ten Honorable Mention	Jon Leuer, WIS	Jon Leuer, WIS
All Big Ten Honorable Mention	Verdell Jones, IND	Verdell Jones, IND
All Big Ten Honorable Mention	David Lighty, OSU	Raymar Morgan, MSU
All Big Ten Honorable Mention	Matt Gatens, IOWA	Mike Davis, ILL
All Big Ten Honorable Mention	Aaron Fuller, IOWA	Drew Crawford, NU
All-Freshman Team	Eric May, IA	Not Selected
All-Freshman Team	D.J. Richardson, ILL	Not Selected
All-Freshman Team	Drew Crawford, NU	Not Selected
All-Freshman Team	Christian Watford, IND	Not Selected
All-Freshman Team	Kelsey Barlow, PUR	Not Selected
All Defensive Team	Dallas Lauderdale, OSU	Not Selected
All Defensive Team	Jeremy Nash, NUU	Not Selected
All Defensive Team	Trévon Hughes, WIS	Not Selected
All Defensive Team	Chris Kramer, PUR	Not Selected
All Defensive Team	JaJuan Johnson, PUR	Not Selected

=== All-Big Ten Academic team ===
The Big Ten Conference had 33 men's basketball letterwinners who were in at least their second academic year at their institution and who maintained a cumulative grade point average (GPA) of 3.0 or higher during the winter semester to earn Big Ten Academic All-Conference honors. Purdue's Mark Wohlford who was a senior economics major had a perfect Winter GPA. These student-athletes were eligible to be named Distinguished Scholar Awardees if they maintained a 3.7 GPA for the entire academic year.

== National awards & honors ==
=== National awards ===
Turner was named the winner of the Oscar Robertson Trophy by the United States Basketball Writers Association as the consensus choice by voters in all nine geographical districts. Fox and Sporting News selected Turner as National Player of the Year. He was also recognized the National Association of Basketball Coaches' Division I Player of the Year and was honored as the Naismith Award recipient. In addition to his basketball honors, Turner was selected as the male Big Ten Athlete of the Year for all sports.

=== NABC ===
The National Association of Basketball Coaches announced their Division I All-District teams on March 16, recognizing the nation's best men's collegiate basketball student-athletes. Selected and voted on by member coaches of the NABC, 240 student-athletes, from 24 districts were chosen. The selection on this list were then eligible for the State Farm Coaches' Division I All-America teams announced at the 2009 NABC Convention in Detroit. The following list represented the Big Ten players chosen to the list. (All Big Ten schools are within District 7 for the 2009–10 season.)

First Team

- Kalin Lucas Michigan State
- Evan Turner Ohio State
- Demetri McCamey Illinois
- E'Twaun Moore Purdue
- Robbie Hummel Purdue
Second Team
- John Shurna Northwestern
- Trévon Hughes Wisconsin
- DeShawn Sims Michigan
- Talor Battle Penn. State
- Manny Harris Michigan

=== USBWA ===
On March 9, the U.S. Basketball Writers Association released its 2009–10 Men's All-District Teams, based on voting from its national membership. There were nine regions from coast to coast, and a player and coach of the year were selected in each. The following lists all the Big Ten representatives selected within their respective regions.

District II (NY, NJ, DE, DC, PA, WV)

None Selected

District V (OH, IN, IL, MI, MN, WI)

Player of the Year

- Evan Turner, Ohio State

Coach of the Year

- Matt Painter, Purdue

All-District Team

- Trévon Hughes, Wisconsin
- Robbie Hummel, Purdue
- JaJuan Johnson, Purdue
- Kalin Lucas, Michigan State
- Demetri McCamey, Illinois
- E'Twaun Moore, Purdue
- Evan Turner, Ohio State
District VI (IA, MO, KS, OK, NE, ND, SD)

None Selected

=== Academic honors ===
==== CoSIDA ====
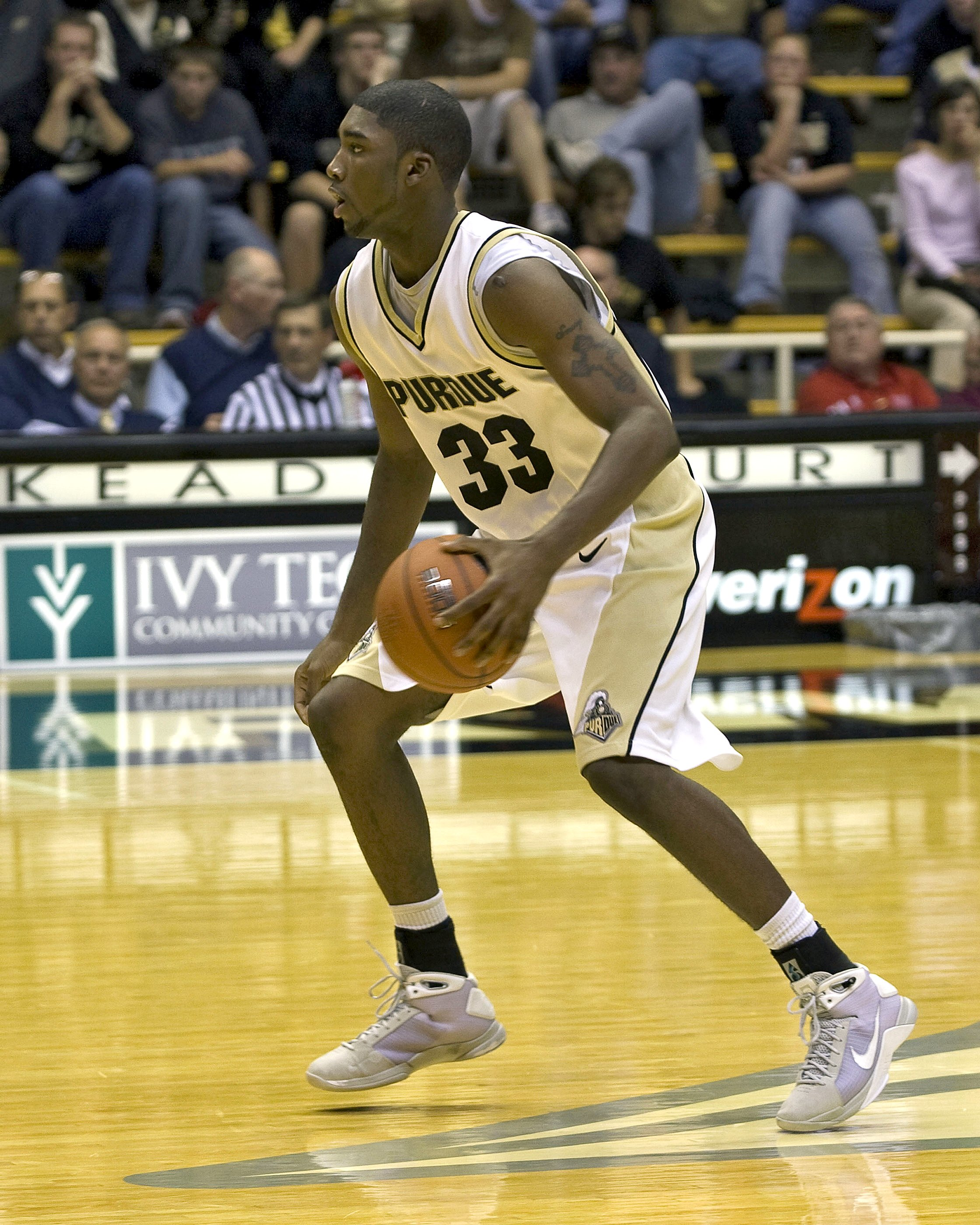
E'Twaun Moore was an Academic All-America selection.

On February 4, 2010, the College Sports Information Directors of America (CoSIDA) and ESPN the Magazine selected their Academic All-Americans from throughout college basketball. CoSIDA has selected Academic All American teams since 1952. To be nominated, a student-athlete must be a starter or important reserve with at least a 3.30 cumulative grade point average (on a 4.0 scale) at his/her current institution. Nominated athletes must have participated in at least 50 percent of the team's games at the position listed on the nomination form (where applicable). No student-athlete is eligible until he has completed one full calendar year at his current institution and has reached sophomore athletic eligibility. In the cases of transfers, graduate students and two-year college graduates, the student-athlete must have completed one full calendar year at the nominating institution to be eligible. Nominees in graduate school must have a cumulative GPA of 3.30 or better both as an undergrad and in grad school. Michigan's Zack Novak was a District 4 first-team 2009 Academic All-District Men's Basketball Team selection and Purdue's E'Twaun Moore was a District 5 selection, making them 2 of the 40 finalists for the 15-man Academic All-American team. On February 22, Moore was selected as a second-team Academic All-American.

==== Big Ten Distinguished Scholar Award ====
Purdue's senior economics major Mark Wohlford was the conference's only men's basketball distinguished scholar by achieving the minimum grade-point average (GPA) of 3.7 or higher.

=== All-American ===
Sporting News selected Evan Turner as a first-team All-American and Trevon Hughes as a fifth-team All-American. Turner was also a first team selection by Associated Press (AP), Fox Sports, United States Basketball Writers Association, National Association of Basketball Coaches (NABC) and Yahoo! Sports. Yahoo! recognized E'Twaun Moore as a third-team selection and both Trevon Hughes and Kalin Lucas as honorable mentions. Fox recognized Robbie Hummel as a third-team selection, while the NABC recognized him as a second team selection. The AP recognized Moore, Hummel and Lucas as honorable mentions. As top 10 finalists for the Lowe's Senior CLASS Award, Chris Kramer (1st team) and Raymar Morgan (2nd team) were regarded as Senior All-Americans.

== Postseason ==
=== Big Ten tournament ===
Evan Turner of the champion Buckeyes was named Tournament Most Outstanding Player. He was joined on the All-Tournament team by Ohio State teammates William Buford and David Lighty, former high school teammate Demetri McCamey of Illinois and Devoe Joseph of Minnesota. Turner led Ohio State with late game heroics in the first two games and a championship game record total number of points in the finals.

=== NCAA tournament ===
In the NCAA tournament, the Big Ten Conference earned 5 invitations. These teams combined for 9 wins, and three teams reached the sweet sixteen round and Michigan State reached the final four.

# of Bids	Record	Win %	R32	S16	E8	F4	CG
5	9–5	.643	4	3	1	1	0

Team	Bid Type	Seed	Results
Ohio State	Automatic	2	Won first round vs #15 Santa Barbara 68–51; Won second round vs #10 Georgia Tech 76–67; Lost third round vs #6 Tennessee 76–73
Purdue	At-large	4	Won first round vs #13 Siena 72–64; Won second round vs #5 Texas A&M 63–61 (OT); Lost third round vs #1 Duke 70–57
Wisconsin	At-large	4	Won first round vs #13 Wofford 53–49; Lost second round vs #12 Cornell 87–69
Michigan State	At-large	5	Won first round vs #12 New Mexico State 70–67; Won second round vs #4 Maryland 85–83; Won third round vs #9 Northern Iowa 59–52; Won fourth round vs #6 Tennessee 70–69; Lost fifth round vs #5 Butler 52–50
Minnesota	At-large	11	Lost first round vs #6 Xavier 65–54

=== National Invitation tournament ===
The Big Ten earned two postseason National Invitation Tournament invitations. Its teams combined for 2 wins and 2 losses, with Illinois earning both wins.

# of Bids	Record	Win %	R2	R3	SF	CG
2	2–2	.500	1	1		

Team	Bid Type	Seed	Results
Illinois	At-large	1	Won First Round vs. #8 Stony Brook 76–66; Won Second Round vs. #4 Kent State 75–58; Lost Third Round vs. #3 Dayton 77–71
Northwestern	At-large	7	Lost First Round vs. #2 Rhode Island 76–64

=== Other tournaments ===
The Big Ten did not have any entrants in the other post season tournaments.

=== 2010 NBA draft ===
Turner was the only Big Ten player selected in the 2010 Draft. The following All-Big Ten performers were listed as seniors: Trévon Hughes, Jason Bohannon, and DeShawn Sims. The following were All-Big Ten underclassmen, who declared early with the intent to hire agents: Evan Turner and Manny Harris. Neither withdrew his name from the draft-eligible list before the May 8 deadline. The following were All-Big Ten underclassmen who entered their name in the draft but who did not hire agents and opted to return to college: Talor Battle, Mike Davis, JaJuan Johnson, Demetri McCamey, and E'Twaun Moore.

== See also ==
- 2009 Big Ten Conference football season
