= DeShawn Sims =

American basketball player (born 1988)

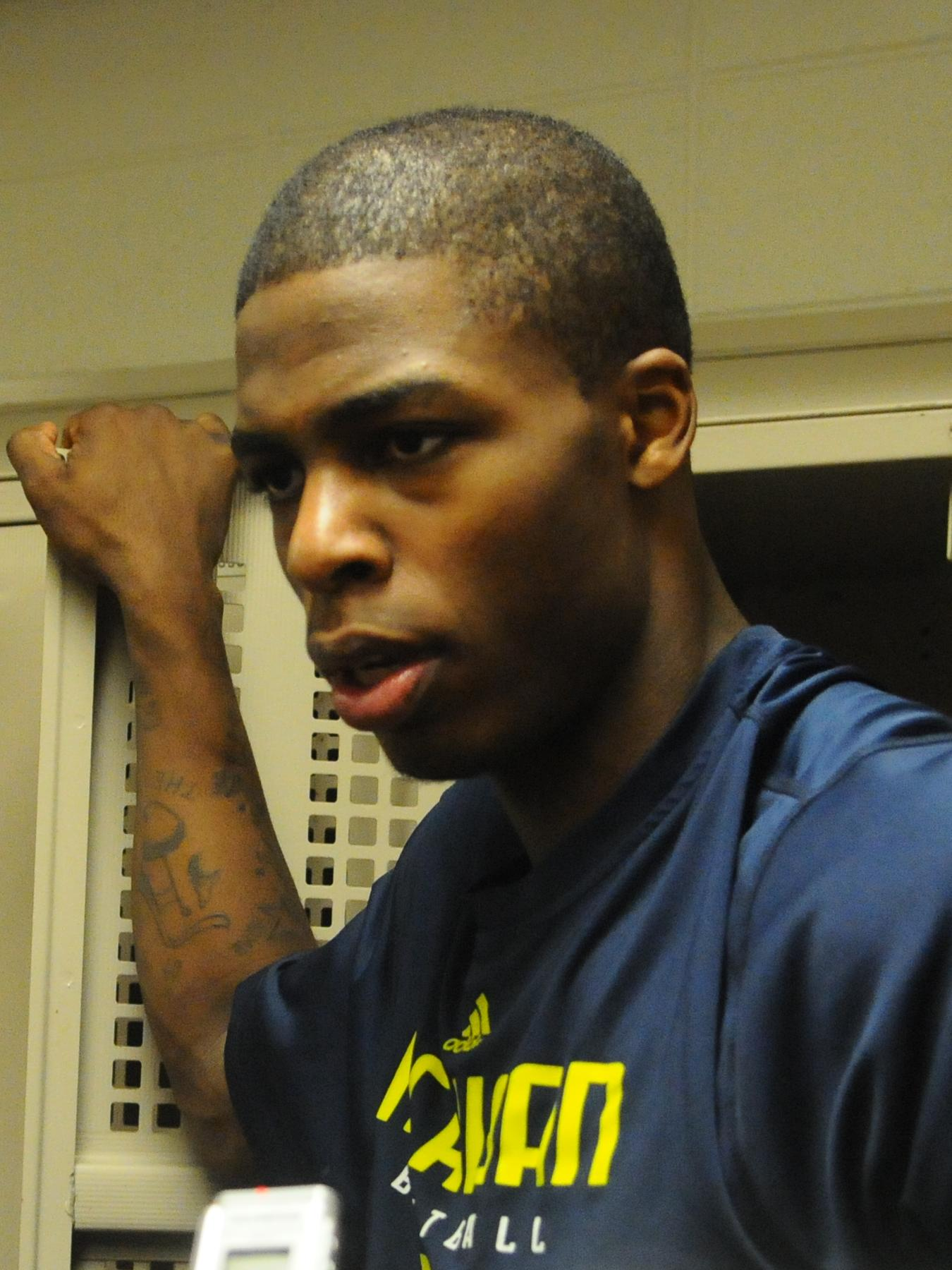
- Sims in 2010

Pershing High School
- League: Detroit Public School League

Personal information
- Born: January 21, 1988 (age 38) Detroit, Michigan, U.S.
- Listed height: 6 ft 8 in (2.03 m)
- Listed weight: 225 lb (102 kg)

Career information
- High school: Pershing (Detroit, Michigan)
- College: Michigan (2006–2010)
- NBA draft: 2010: undrafted
- Playing career: 2010–2022
- Position: Forward
- Number: 16
- Coaching career: 2024–present

Career history

Playing
- 2010: PAOK
- 2010–2011: Maine Red Claws
- 2011: Piratas de Quebradillas
- 2011–2012: Jeonju KCC Egis
- 2012: Maine Red Claws
- 2012–2013: Sagesse
- 2013–2014: Hapoel Gilboa Galil
- 2014–2015: Jeonju KCC Egis
- 2015–2016: Champville Maristes
- 2016: Maccabi Kiryat Gat
- 2016–2017: NPC Rieti
- 2017–2018: Eurobasket Roma
- 2018–2020: Biella
- 2020–2021: Pistoia
- 2021–2022: Chieti

Coaching
- 2024–present: Pershing

Career highlights
- NBA Development League All-Star (2011); NBA Development League Rookie of the Year (2011); All-Big Ten (2nd team: 2010, 2009 (media); 3rd team: 2009 (coaches); honorable mention: 2008); Fourth-team Parade All-American (2006)

DeShawn Adrian Sims Jr. (born January 21, 1988) is an American basketball coach and former professional basketball player. He is the head coach at Pershing High School and last played for Chieti of the Serie A2 Basket. He has previously played for Sagesse and Champville of the Lebanese Basketball League, as well as teams in Greece, Korea, Israel and Puerto Rico after a career with the Michigan Wolverines men's basketball team. In high school, he became Associated Press Class A Player of the Year, a Jordan Brand All-American and a fourth team Parade All-American. At Michigan he became a second-team All-Big Ten Conference selection. He had signed a free-agent contract with the Boston Celtics for whom he played in the Orlando Summer League in addition to playing for the Dallas Mavericks in the NBA Summer League. He became a 2011 D-League All-Star and NBA Development League Rookie of the Year.

During the 2008-09 NCAA Division I men's basketball season, Sims ranked among the leaders in the Big Ten Conference in rebounds per game, points per game and Field goal percentage. He led the 2008–09 Michigan Wolverines men's basketball team in rebounding and scoring in victories over two top-five ranked teams as a college junior, which enabled them to earn a place in the national rankings for the first time in nearly three years. In addition, while the team was on the proverbial bubble, he led the team in scoring in each of the last five games before the 2009 NCAA Men's Division I Basketball Tournament, including the only other regular season victory of the season against a ranked opponent. At the conclusion of the 2008–09 Big Ten Conference men's basketball season he was named to the second team All-Big Ten team by the media and the third team by the coaches.

Prior to the beginning of the 2009-10 NCAA Division I men's basketball season, Sims was one of two members (along with Manny Harris) of the 2009–10 Michigan Wolverines men's basketball team named among the 50 preseason Wooden Award watch list nominees. At the conclusion of 2009–10 Big Ten Conference regular season he was recognized as a second-team All-Big Ten selection by both the coaches and the media. Sims concluded the season as the Big Ten Conference leader in offensive rebounds.

== High school ==
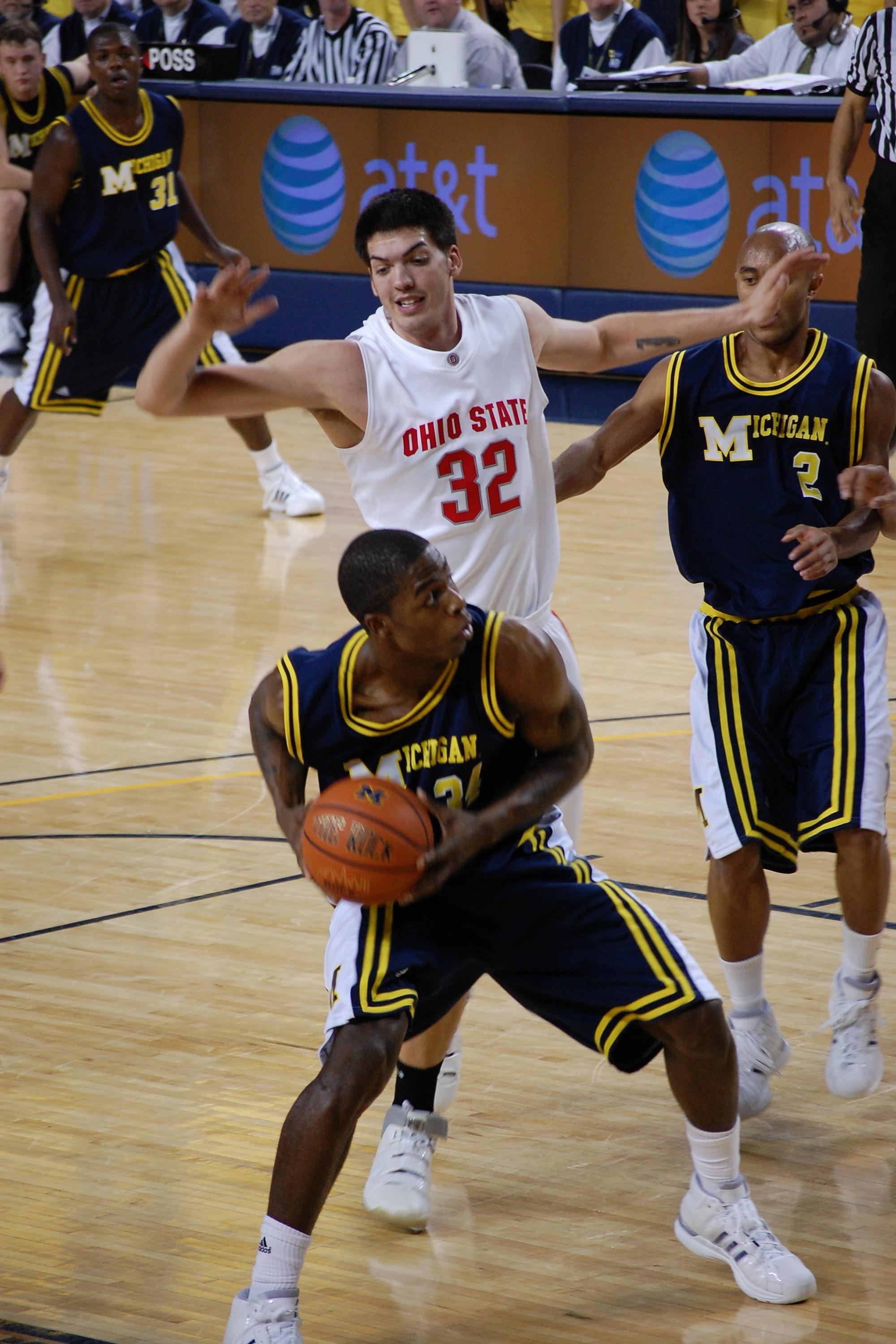
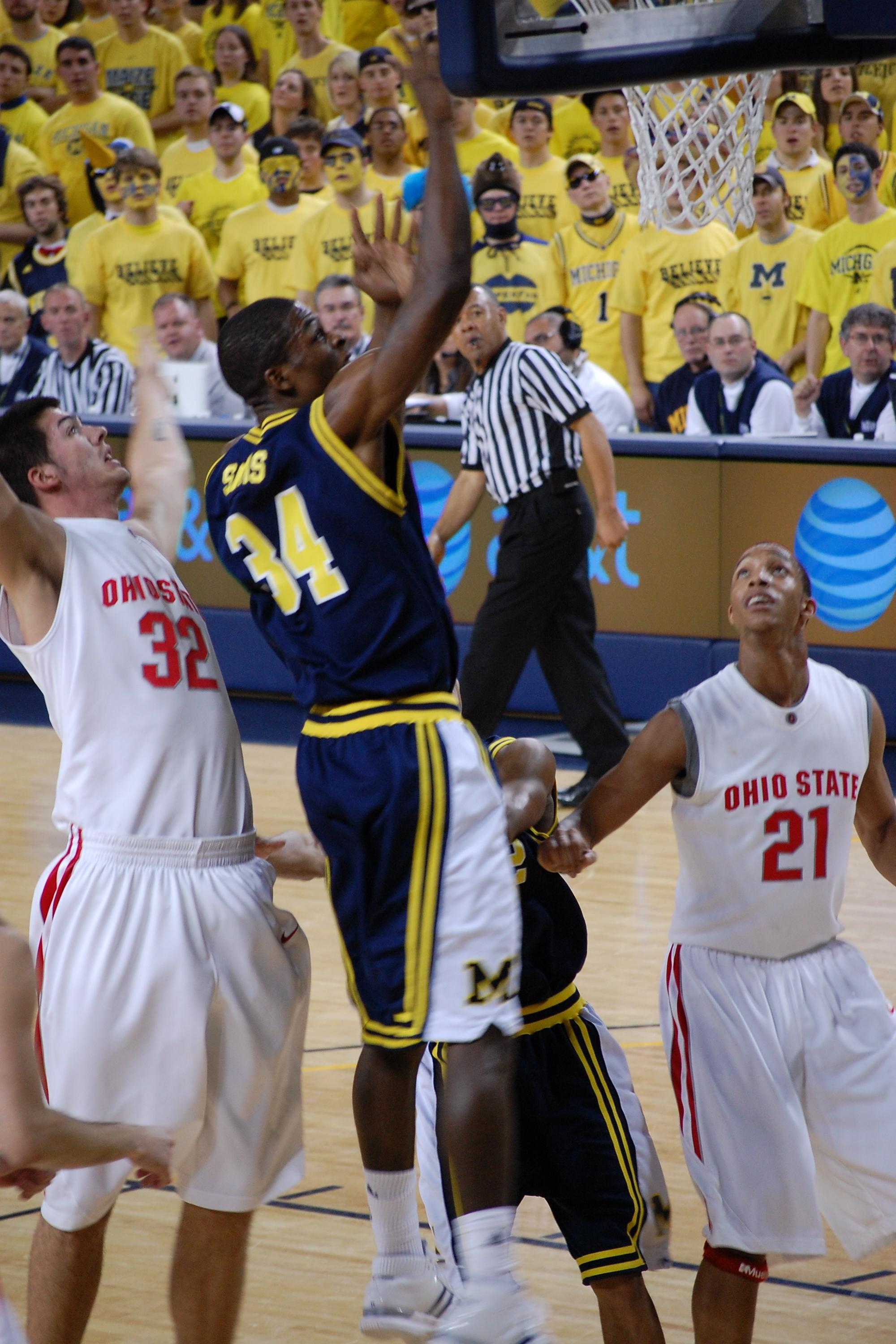
Sims in action against Ohio State in a 1989 Michigan Championship throwback uniform (2009)

Born in Detroit, Michigan, as the son of Lolita Pruitt and DeShawn Sims Sr. He claims to have 13 brothers and sisters. Sims starred at Pershing High School, where, as a freshman, he played the guard position. He became a starter as a sophomore and earned both Detroit News and Detroit Free Press All-Detroit, honorable mention recognition. In his junior season, he was named Associated Press Class A All-State. As a senior in the 2005–06 season, he earned Associated Press Class A Player of the Year honors. That season, he was a Jordan Brand All-American, a fourth team Parade All-American, and a unanimous Associated Press Class A All-State selection. He led his team to the Detroit Public School League championship game where they lost to Redford High School, a team that was led by junior Manny Harris, who later became Sims' teammate at Michigan. Over the course of his senior season, he averaged 25.0 points, 12.0 rebounds, 3.0 blocks and 4.0 assists. He placed third in the Hal Schram Mr. Basketball of Michigan voting, trailing David Kool and Tom Herzog. Sims high school team won the Detroit Public School League championship each of his four years there.

He played in various All-star games and earned the MVP of the Capital Classic in Washington, D.C. In high school, Rivals.com ranked Sims as the #6 high school power forward and #31 overall high school basketball player in the United States. Scout.com ranked Sims as the #9 high school small forward in the country. Sims is known by a nickname that has been published in the press as both Peedi and Peety.

College recruiting
Name	Hometown	School	Height	Weight	Commit date
DeShawn Sims; Power forward	Detroit, Michigan	Pershing (MI)	6 ft 7 in (2.01 m)	222 lb (101 kg)	Dec 8, 2005
DeShawn Sims; Power forward	Recruit ratings: Rivals:				
DeShawn Sims; Small forward	Detroit, Michigan	Pershing (MI)	6 ft 7 in (2.01 m)	225 lb (102 kg)	Dec 8, 2005
DeShawn Sims; Small forward	Recruit ratings: Scout:				
Overall recruit ranking: Scout: 9 (SF) Rivals: 31, 6 (PF)
Note: In many cases, Scout, Rivals, 247Sports, On3, and ESPN may conflict in their listings of height and weight.; In these cases, the average was taken. ESPN grades are on a 100-point scale.; Sources: "Michigan Basketball Commitments". Rivals.; "2006 Michigan Basketball Commits". Scout.; "ESPN". ESPN.; "Scout.com Team Recruiting Rankings". Scout.; "2006 Team Ranking". Rivals.

== College ==
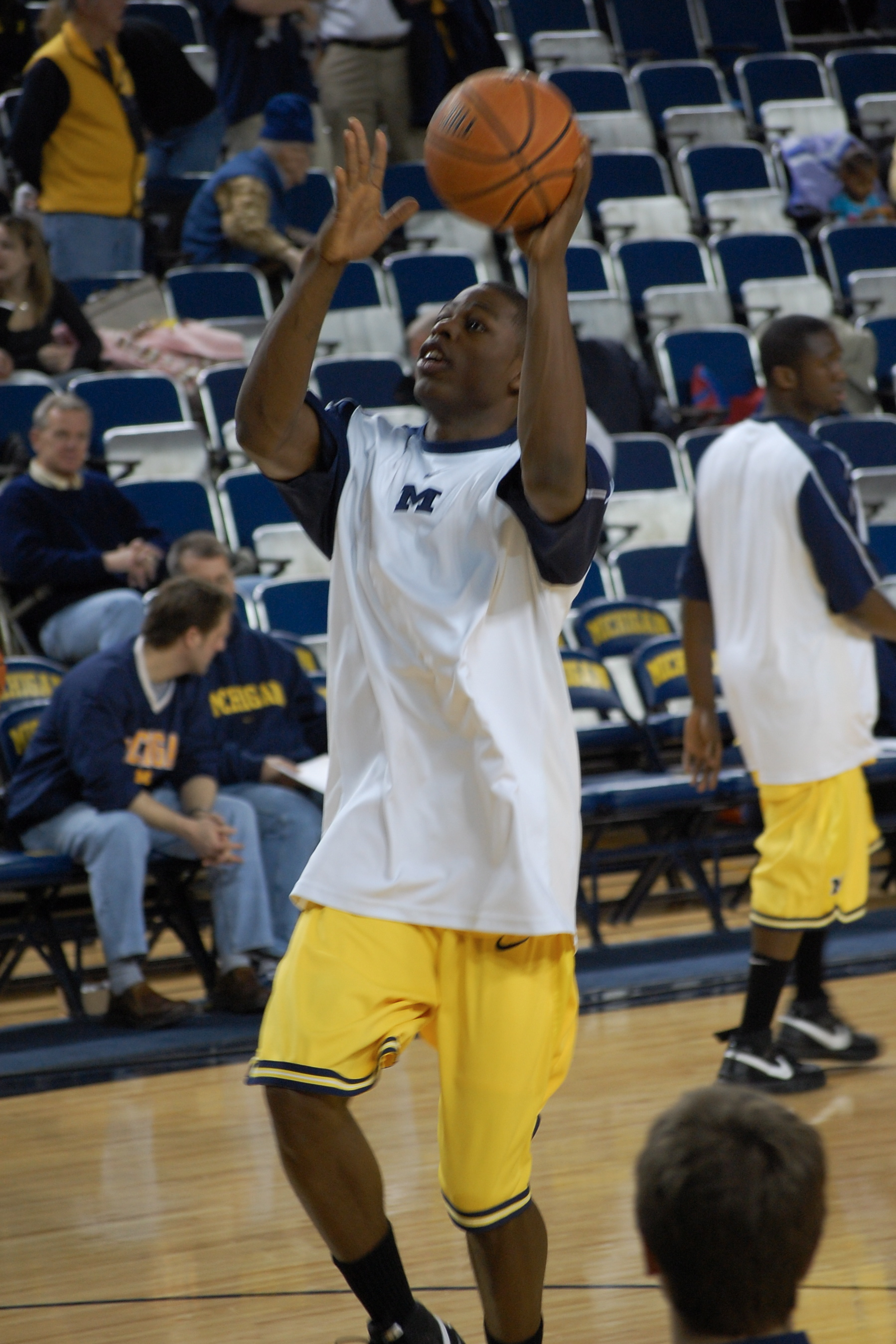
Sims warming up (2008)

=== Freshman and sophomore years ===
At the University of Michigan, Sims started two games as a freshman and all 32 games as a sophomore. He debuted for the 2006–07 Michigan Wolverines in the season opener with 2 points and 2 rebounds in 6 minutes on November 10 against Central Connecticut and made his first start on December 28 against Army, scoring 13 points. His brother, Marcus Pruitt, who was a 6 ft 11 in (2.11 m) junior at Pershing, was fatally shot during Sims's freshman year. He was coached by Tommy Amaker as a freshman before John Beilein took over as head coach. The following year, during the 2007-08 NCAA Division I men's basketball season, his averages jumped from 3.4 points per game to 12.3 and from 2.3 rebounds per game to 5.4. During that season, he led Michigan in rebounding and placed 14th in the Big Ten Conference, while placing 12th in the conference in scoring. This earned him an All-Big Ten honorable mention. During his sophomore year, Sims opened the John Beilein era at Michigan by earning Big Ten Player of the Week honors for the week of November 12, 2007.

=== Junior year ===
2008–09 Michigan Wolverines men's basketball Big Ten Season
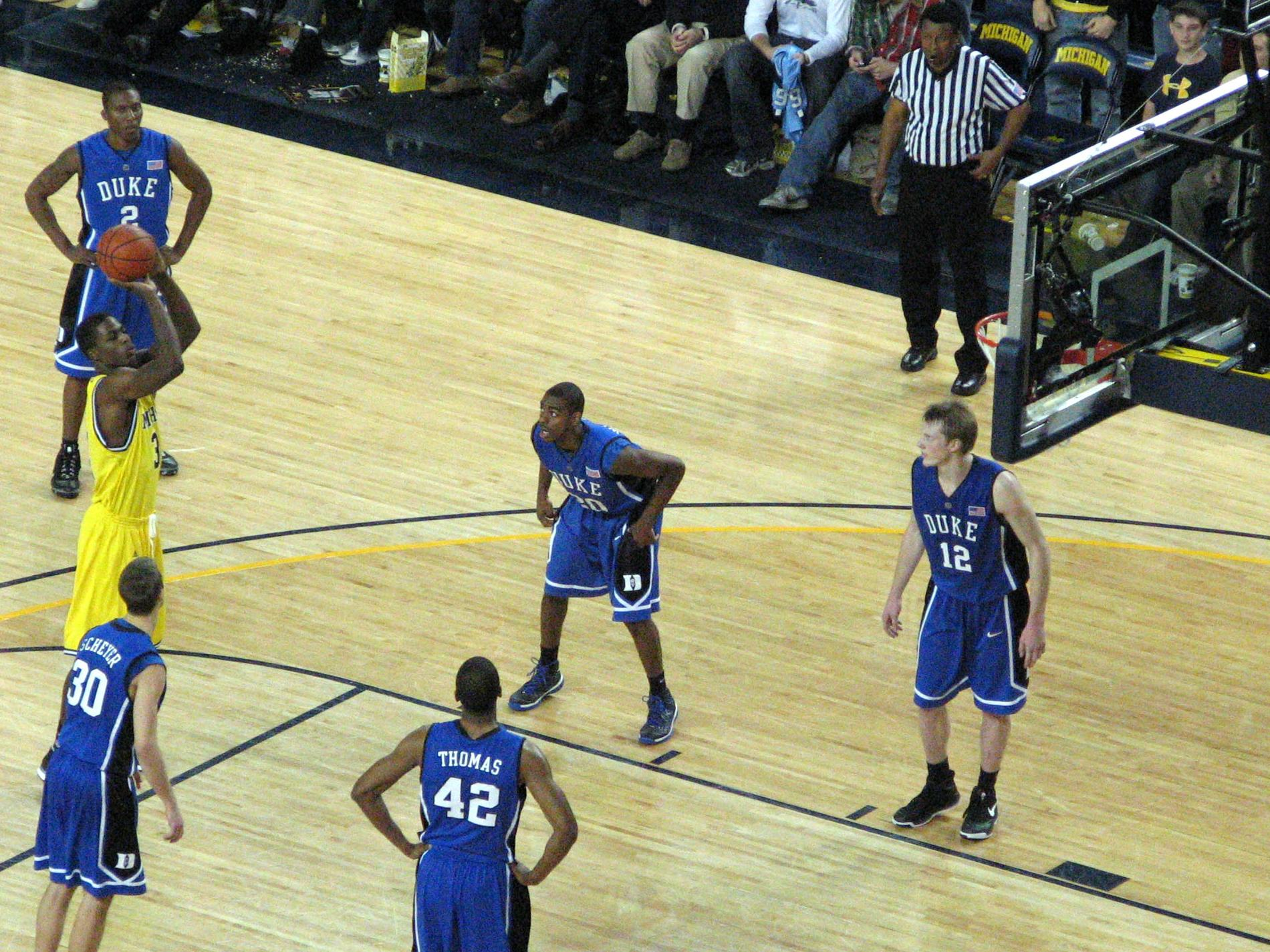
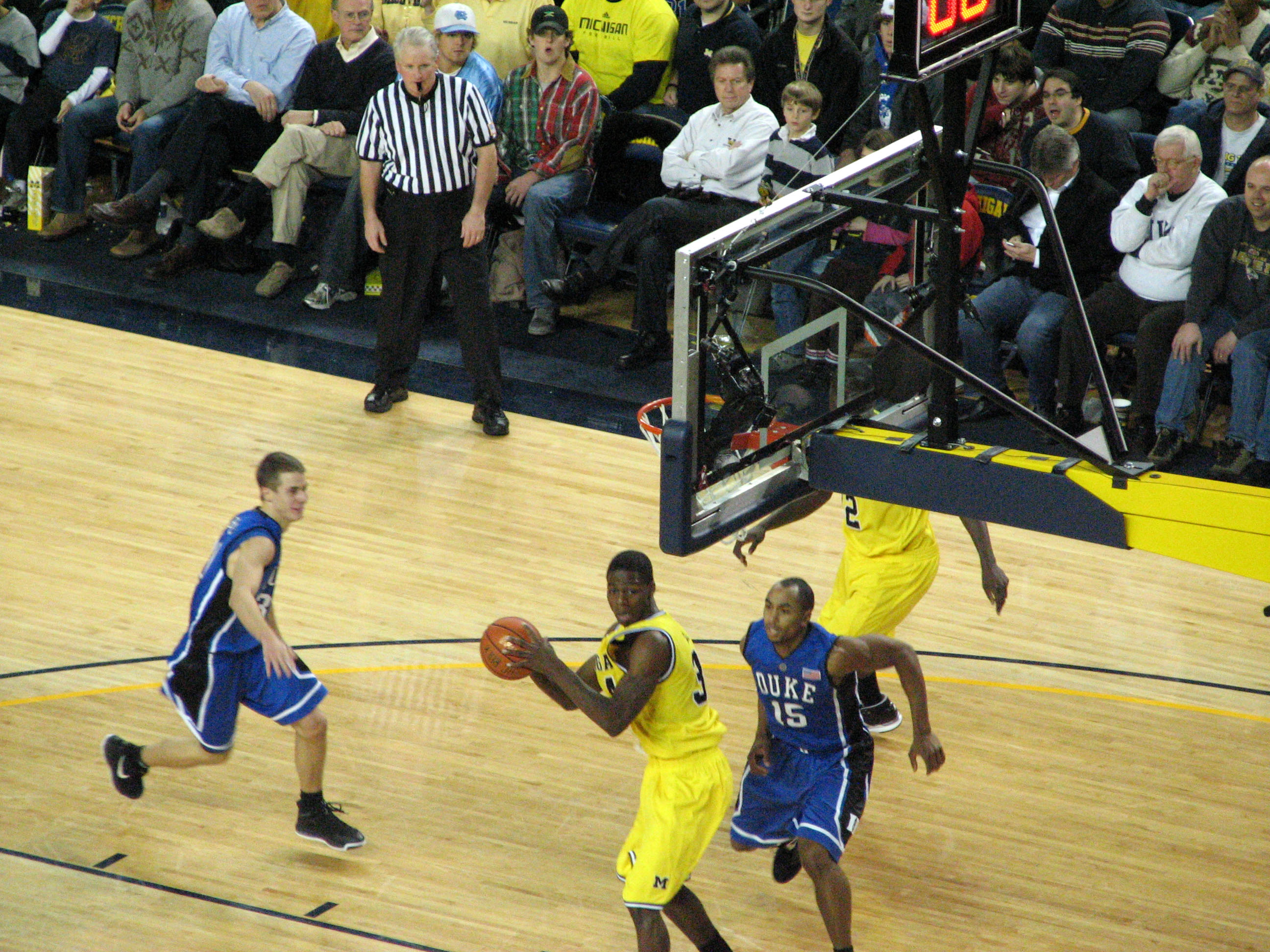
Sims in action in victory over Duke (2008)

As a junior, he became one of the leading scorers, shot blockers and rebounders in the Big Ten Conference. On November 20, 2008, the unranked Wolverines team upset the #4 ranked UCLA Bruins men's basketball team for its first win over a top-five team in eleven years. On November 29, 2008, against Savannah State, Sims posted game-highs of 23 points and 12 rebounds, including an overtime buzzer beater as Michigan overcame a 20-point half time deficit. Sims, served as sixth man during November, led the team in scoring with 18 points and tied for the lead in rebounds. On December 3, Sims entered the starting lineup during a game against Maryland in the ACC-Big Ten Challenge. On December 6, 2008, Michigan posted its second consecutive win over a top 5 opponent in a rematch against the #4 ranked Duke Blue Devils men's basketball team. Sims again, led the team in scoring with a career-high 28 points and posted a team-high with 12 rebounds. On December 22, 2008, Sims became the first Wolverine to score 20 points and add 20 rebounds since Phil Hubbard had 22 points and 26 rebounds in a victory over University of Detroit in the 1977 NCAA Men's Division I Basketball Tournament. As a result of the major victories and continuing team success they reached the top 25 in the national rankings on December 22 for the first time since February 6, 2006. On February 26, he was the high scorer again with a career-high 29 points in game against the #16-ranked Purdue Boilermakers men's basketball team that Michigan won 87–78, raising its record to 3–4 against ranked opponents on the season. At the conclusion of the 2008–09 Big Ten Conference men's basketball regular season, he was named to the second team All-Big Ten team by the media and the third team by the coaches.

Sims led the team in scoring in six of its last seven games including five consecutive games covering the last three regular season games and both 2009 Big Ten Conference men's basketball tournament games. Sims led the Wolverines in field goal percentage, rebounds and blocked shots. He finished second on the team in minute played, steals and points per game. Sims ended the season fifth in rebounds per game, fifth in points per game and eighth in field goal percentage, eleventh in block shots per game and fifteenth in steals per game in the Big Ten Conference. After, Harris was named team MVP, he requested that Sims be recognized as co-MVP. Sims was recognized as co-MVP.

=== Senior year ===
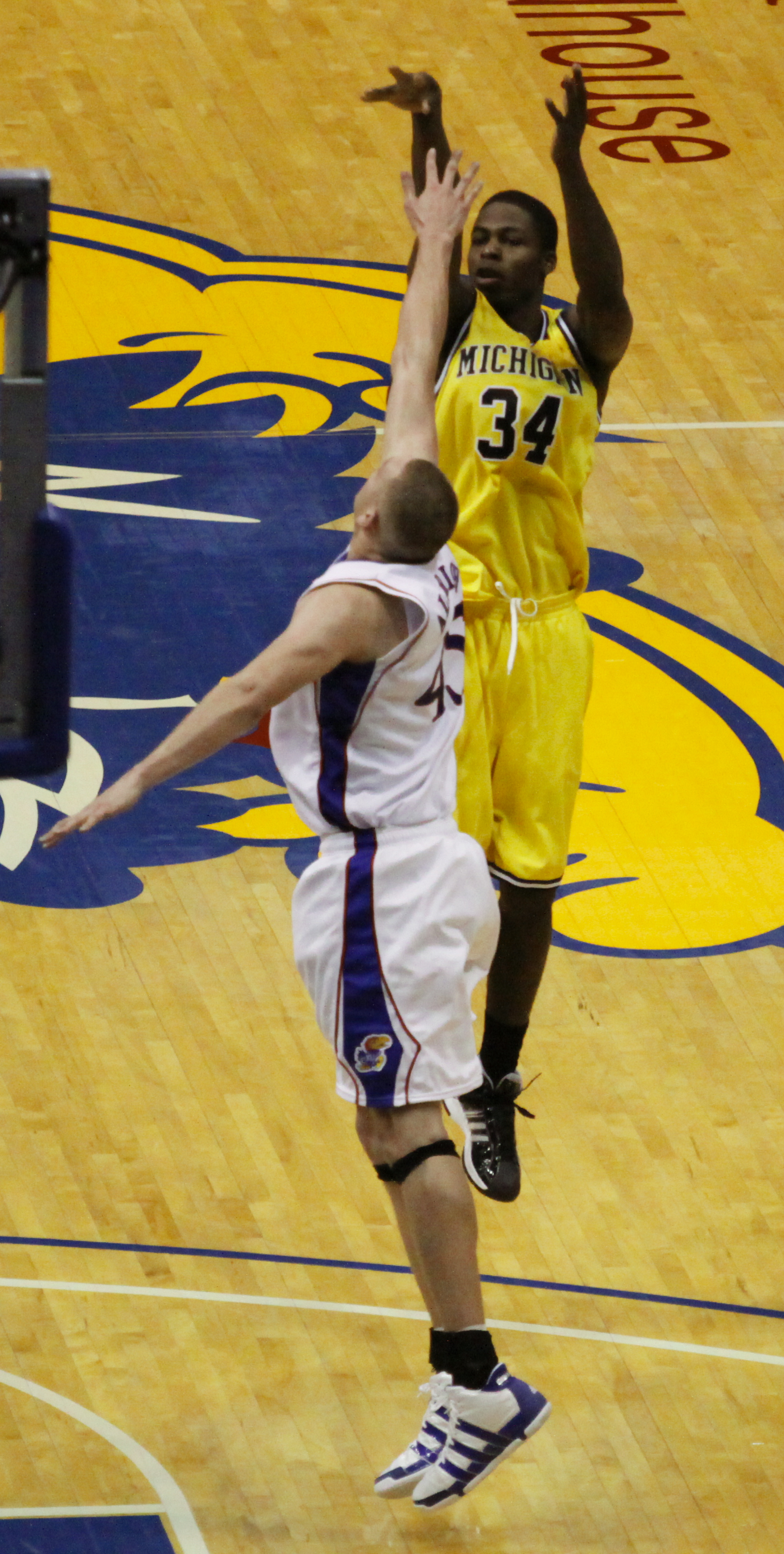
Sims shoots over Cole Aldrich of #1-ranked Kansas

Harris and Sims were named among the 50 preseason Wooden Award watch list nominees. Sims became the second Wolverine to earn Big Ten Player of the Week during the 2009–10 Big Ten Conference men's basketball season for his efforts during week nine (January 4–10). As the season progressed, Sims was called on to take decisive shots in a few close games: On January 26, he attempted an alley oop with 0.9 seconds remaining as Michigan trailed by one point against Michigan State, and on February 16, he made a game-tying three point shot against Iowa with 6.1 seconds remaining to enable Michigan to emerge victorious in overtime. At the conclusion of the regular season, he was named a second-team All-conference selection by both the coaches and the media. He was also recognized as Michigan's Big Ten Sportsmanship Awards honoree. He was recognized as an All-District second-team selection by the National Association of Basketball Coaches making him eligible for the State Farm Division I All‐America teams.

Sims led the conference in offensive rebounds and ranked fifth in scoring. He was also among the leaders in field goal percentage (14th) and steals (15th). Sims was undrafted in the 2010 NBA draft.

== Professional career ==
After going undrafted in the June 24, 2010 NBA draft, Sims signed a free agent contract with the Boston Celtics. Sims played in four games for the Celtics in the Orlando Summer League and then four games for the Dallas Mavericks in the NBA Summer League.

In August 2010 he signed with Greek club PAOK BC. On November 2, he left PAOK, after having played 3 games with the Greek team, in which he averaged 12.3 PPG in 21.7 minutes. Later that month, Sims signed with the Maine Red Claws of the NBA Development League, who are the D League affiliate of the Celtics. He earned a selection to the 2011 D-League All-Star game. In the game, he posted 20 points. Over the course of the season, he finished fourth in the league with a 20.3 points per game as well as 7.7 rebounds. Along the way he posted 13 double doubles and earned the 2011 NBA Development League Rookie of the Year Award. In April 2011 he signed with Piratas de Quebradillas in Puerto Rico. In July 2011 during the 2011 NBA lockout, he signed with Jeonju KCC Egis in South Korea. On March 6, Sims rejoined the Red Claws, replacing Dominic Calegari on the roster. Sims posted a 12-point and 15-rebound double double for the Red Claws on March 10 against the Canton Charge. He last appeared in a game for the Red Claws on March 16 against the Austin Toros. On March 21, he was reported to have an ankle injury.

In July 2012, Sims was named to the Phoenix Suns roster for the 2012 Las Vegas Summer League. In September 2012, he signed with Sagesse of the Lebanese Basketball League. He posted 22.5 points and 8.3 rebounds per game in Lebanon, while shooting 36.4% on his three-point shots. Sims was expected to join the Boston Celtics' 2013 Orlando Summer League team. However, he was not on the summer roster.

On September 30, 2013, Sims signed with the Boston Celtics. He was one of four nonguaranteed training camp invites (along with Damen Bell-Holter, Kammron Taylor and Chris Babb), vying for the final roster spot after accounting for the 14 guaranteed contracts. He was one of three small forwards invited to camp, along with Jeff Green, Gerald Wallace. On October 26, 2013, he was waived by the Celtics who waived all four nonguaranteed invitees reducing their roster to 14. After waiving the four players, Celtics president of basketball operations Danny Ainge said all four were welcome to join the team's D-League affiliate, Maine Red Claws, if they were willing to accept the low paying salary instead of higher paying offers overseas. Sims was the only one of the four who did not sign with the Red Claws by the end of the month. That year, he went on to sign with Hapoel Gilboa Galil of the Israeli Basketball Super League. In August 2014, he signed with Jeonju KCC Egis of the Korean Basketball League.

On March 6, 2015, Sims signed with Champville of the Lebanese Basketball League. On March 1, 2016, Sims signed with Maccabi Kiryat Gat B.C. of the Israeli Basketball Premier League.

On July 6, 2017, Sims signed with Italian club Eurobasket Roma, after a monstre season with NPC Rieti. He averaged 18.2 points per game on the team. On July 4, 2018, Sims signed with Pallacanestro Biella.

On July 20, 2020, Sims has signed with Pistoia of the Serie A2 Basket. In December 2021, he joined Chieti of the Serie A2 Basket. He retired in 2022.

== Coaching career ==
After retiring from basketball in 2022, Sims and Harris opened a restaurant in Southfield, Michigan. Sims began his coaching career as a coach for his high school alma mater Pershing on April 9, 2024. He planned to employ the 1–3–1 defense and offense and to lean on his former Michigan head coach John Beilein.

== See also ==
- 2006 high school boys basketball All-Americans
