= 2009–10 Purdue Boilermakers men's basketball team =

American college basketball season

2009–10 Purdue Boilermakers men's basketball

Big Ten regular season co-champions Paradise Jam champions

NCAA tournament, Sweet Sixteen
- Conference: Big Ten Conference

Ranking
- Coaches: No. 12
- AP: No. 10
- Record: 29–6 (14–4 Big Ten)
- Head coach: Matt Painter (5th season)
- Assistant coaches: Paul Lusk; Rick Ray; Jack Owens
- Home arena: Mackey Arena

2009–10 Big Ten Conference men's basketball standings
	Conf.				Overall
Team	W		L	PCT	W		L	PCT
No. 5 Ohio State†	14	–	4	.778	29	–	8	.784
No. 10 Purdue	14	–	4	.778	29	–	6	.829
No. 13 Michigan State	14	–	4	.778	28	–	9	.757
No. 16 Wisconsin	13	–	5	.722	24	–	9	.727
Illinois	10	–	8	.556	21	–	15	.583
Minnesota	9	–	9	.500	21	–	14	.600
Northwestern	7	–	11	.389	20	–	14	.588
Michigan	7	–	11	.389	15	–	17	.469
Indiana	4	–	14	.222	10	–	21	.323
Iowa	4	–	14	.222	10	–	22	.313
Penn State	3	–	15	.167	11	–	20	.355
† 2010 Big Ten tournament winner As of April 3, 2010; Rankings from AP Poll

The 2009–10 Purdue Boilermakers men's basketball team represented Purdue University. The head coach was Matt Painter, then in his fifth season with the Boilers. The team played its home games in Mackey Arena in West Lafayette, Indiana, as a member of the Big Ten Conference.

They made the NCAA Tournament where they were the 4th seed. They defeated #13 Siena in the first round, #5 Texas A&M in the second round, before losing to the champions #1 Duke in the Sweet Sixteen.

== Season notes ==
- Junior guard E'Twaun Moore, forward Robbie Hummel, forward/center JaJuan Johnson, along with senior guard Keaton Grant, each scored their 1,000th career point.
- Keaton Grant broke the school record with most career games, eclipsing Marcus Green's 132 mark set last season with 138.
- Robbie Hummel broke the school record of consecutive free throws made, making 36, breaking Jerry Sichting's prior mark of 34.
- Robbie Hummel made 8 three point-field goals in a game, tying Cuonzo Martin's sixteen-year-old school record.
- Senior guard Chris Kramer broke Brian Cardinal's 259 career steals mark, giving Kramer the school's career steals record with an eventual 274.
- The team's 14–0 start on the season is tied for the best in Purdue Men's basketball history, along with its first undefeated preseason record since the 1993–94 season.
- With a victory over Minnesota on January 5, 2010, Purdue won its 500th game at Mackey Arena.
- Robbie Hummel became the first Boilermaker to score 35 points in a game since Carl Landry did in 2005.
- Head coach Matt Painter won his 100th game as Purdue's head coach with a victory over Wisconsin on January 28, 2010.
- Purdue became the first and only team in Big Ten Conference history to beat Indiana, Michigan State, Ohio State, Illinois, and Minnesota on the road in a single season.
- Purdue received a #3 ranking in both major polls, giving the program its highest since 1994.
- Robbie Hummel suffered a torn anterior cruciate ligament on February 24, 2010, in a road game against Minnesota, prematurely ending his season.
- The 2010 senior class became the winningest class in school history, surpassing the 98 wins mark with 102.
- Purdue won its 22nd Big Ten Conference title, the most of any Big Ten school and its first in fourteen years.
- Coach Matt Painter was named the Big Ten Coach of the Year for the second time in three years.
- Both E'Twaun Moore and Robbie Hummel were named First Team All-Big Ten, the first time for multiple Boilermakers since 1988.
- Kelsey Barlow was named to the Big Ten All-Freshman Team, becoming the fifth Boiler in four years with the honor.
- Chris Kramer received his second Big Ten Defensive Player of the Year honors.
- Purdue reached a second straight Sweet Sixteen appearance in the NCAA tournament.
- Purdue's 29 wins on the season tied the most in school history with the 1993–94 team.

== Roster ==
2009–10 Purdue Boilermakers men's basketball team
Players
Coaches

Pos.	#	Name	Height	Weight	Year	Hometown
G	1	Stevie Loveless	6 ft 5 in (1.96 m)	196 lb (89 kg)	Fr	Frankfort, IN
G	2	Andrew Day	6 ft 0 in (1.83 m)	179 lb (81 kg)	So	West Lafayette, IN
G	3	Chris Kramer (C)	6 ft 3 in (1.91 m)	214 lb (97 kg)	Sr	Huntington, IN
F	4	Robbie Hummel (C)	6 ft 8 in (2.03 m)	208 lb (94 kg)	Jr	Valparaiso, IN
F	5	Keaton Grant (C)	6 ft 4 in (1.93 m)	201 lb (91 kg)	Sr	Kissimmee, Florida
G	12	Kelsey Barlow	6 ft 5 in (1.96 m)	199 lb (90 kg)	Fr	Indianapolis, IN
G	21	DJ Byrd	6 ft 5 in (1.96 m)	214 lb (97 kg)	Fr	Crawfordsville, IN
G	23	Lewis Jackson	5 ft 9 in (1.75 m)	165 lb (75 kg)	So	Decatur, IL
G	24	Ryne Smith	6 ft 3 in (1.91 m)	178 lb (81 kg)	So	Toledo, OH
F/C	25	JaJuan Johnson	6 ft 10 in (2.08 m)	215 lb (98 kg)	Jr	Indianapolis, IN
G	30	Mark Wohlford	6 ft 0 in (1.83 m)	186 lb (84 kg)	Sr	Columbus, IN
G	32	John Hart	6 ft 2 in (1.88 m)	180 lb (82 kg)	RS Fr	Beech Grove, IN
G	33	E'Twaun Moore	6 ft 3 in (1.91 m)	184 lb (83 kg)	Jr	East Chicago, IN
F	41	Patrick Bade	6 ft 8 in (2.03 m)	235 lb (107 kg)	Fr	Indianapolis, IN
F	55	Aleksandar Marcius (redshirt)	6 ft 9 in (2.06 m)	261 lb (118 kg)	Fr	Nedelisce, Croatia

Head coach

Matt Painter (Purdue)

Assistant coach(es)

Paul Lusk (Southern Illinois)
Rick Ray (Grand View)
Jack Owens (Eastern Illinois)

Legend

- (C) Team captain
- (S) Suspended
- (I) Ineligible
- (W) Walk-on
- Injured
- Current redshirt

Roster
Last update: 2010-02-20

=== Incoming recruits ===
College recruiting information
Name	Hometown	School	Height	Weight	Commit date
Patrick Bade; PF	Indianapolis, IN	Franklin Central High School	6 ft 8 in (2.03 m)	220 lb (100 kg)	May 21, 2008
Patrick Bade; PF	Recruit ratings: Scout: Rivals: (87)				
Kelsey Barlow; SF	Indianapolis, IN	Cathedral High School	6 ft 6 in (1.98 m)	175 lb (79 kg)	Sep 13, 2007
Kelsey Barlow; SF	Recruit ratings: Scout: Rivals: (87)				
DJ Byrd; SF	Crawfordsville, IN	North Montgomery High School	6 ft 5 in (1.96 m)	205 lb (93 kg)	Sep 5, 2007
DJ Byrd; SF	Recruit ratings: Scout: Rivals: (89)				
Sandi Marcius; C	LaPorte, IN	La Lumiere School	6 ft 10 in (2.08 m)	240 lb (110 kg)	Apr 25, 2009
Sandi Marcius; C	Recruit ratings: Scout: Rivals: (90)				
Overall recruit ranking:
Note: In many cases, Scout, Rivals, 247Sports, On3, and ESPN may conflict in their listings of height and weight.; In these cases, the average was taken. ESPN grades are on a 100-point scale.; Sources: "2009 Purdue Signees". Rivals.; "2009 Purdue Signees". Scout.; "2009 Purdue Signees". ESPN.; "Scout.com Team Recruiting Rankings". Scout.; "2009 Team Ranking". Rivals.

== Schedule ==
Date time, TV	Rank^{#}	Opponent^{#}	Result	Record	Site (attendance) city, state
Exhibition
November 3*; 7:00 pm, BTN Online	No. 7	California of Pennsylvania	W 78–44		Mackey Arena; West Lafayette, IN
November 9*; 7:00 pm, BTN Online	No. 7	Kentucky Wesleyan	W 74–52		Mackey Arena; West Lafayette, IN
Regular season
November 13*; 7:00 pm, ESPN360	No. 7	Cal State Northridge	W 89–64	1–0	Mackey Arena (14,123); West Lafayette, IN
November 20*; 8:30 pm	No. 7	vs. South Dakota State; Paradise Jam tournament	W 74–63	2–0	The Sports and Fitness Center (3,117); Saint Thomas, U.S. Virgin Islands
November 22*; 8:30 pm, FCS	No. 7	vs. Saint Joseph's; Paradise Jam Tournament	W 85–60	3–0	The Sports and Fitness Center (4,000); Saint Thomas, U.S. Virgin Islands
November 23*; 8:30 pm, FSN	No. 6	vs. No. 9 Tennessee; Paradise Jam Tournament	W 73–72	4–0	The Sports and Fitness Center (3,755); Saint Thomas, U.S. Virgin Islands
November 28*; 11:30 am, BTN	No. 6	Central Michigan	W 64–38	5–0	Mackey Arena (12,002); West Lafayette, IN
December 1*; 7:00 pm, ESPN	No. 4	Wake Forest; ACC-Big Ten Challenge	W 69–58	6–0	Mackey Arena (14,123); West Lafayette, IN
December 5*; 5:00 pm, BTN	No. 4	Buffalo	W 101–65	7–0	Mackey Arena (14,123); West Lafayette, IN
December 9*; 7:00 pm, BTN	No. 5	Valparaiso	W 86–62	8–0	Mackey Arena (14,034); West Lafayette, IN
December 12*; 9:00 pm, ESPN2	No. 5	at Alabama	W 73–65	9–0	Coleman Coliseum (12,477); Tuscaloosa, AL
December 19*; 4:00 pm, BTN	No. 4	vs. Ball State; Wooden Tradition	W 69–49	10–0	Conseco Fieldhouse (7,813); Indianapolis, IN
December 22*; 8:00 pm, ESPNU	No. 4	SIU Edwardsville	W 90–63	11–0	Mackey Arena (12,048); West Lafayette, IN
December 29; 7:00 pm, BTN	No. 4	at Iowa	W 67–56	12–0 (1–0)	Carver-Hawkeye Arena (12,468); Iowa City, IA
January 1*; 2:30 pm, ESPN	No. 4	No. 6 West Virginia	W 77–62	13–0 (1–0)	Mackey Arena (14,123); West Lafayette, IN
January 5; 7:00 pm, ESPN2	No. 4	Minnesota	W 79–60	14–0 (2–0)	Mackey Arena (11,336); West Lafayette, IN
January 9; 1:30 pm, BTN	No. 4	at No. 17 Wisconsin	L 66–73	14–1 (2–1)	Kohl Center (17,230); Madison, WI
January 12; 7:00 pm, ESPN	No. 6	Ohio State	L 66–70	14–2 (2–2)	Mackey Arena (14,123); West Lafayette, IN
January 16; 5:30 pm, BTN	No. 6	at Northwestern	L 64–72	14–3 (2–3)	Welsh-Ryan Arena (8,117); Evanston, IL
January 19; 9:00 pm, ESPN	No. 13	at Illinois	W 84–78	15–3 (3–3)	Assembly Hall (16,618); Champaign, IL
January 23; 4:00 pm, ESPN	No. 13	Michigan	W 69–59	16–3 (4–3)	Mackey Arena (14,123); West Lafayette, IN
January 28; 7:00 pm, ESPN2	No. 10	No. 16 Wisconsin	W 60–57	17–3 (5–3)	Mackey Arena (14,123); West Lafayette, IN
January 31; 3:00 pm, BTN	No. 10	Penn State	W 66–46	18–3 (6–3)	Mackey Arena (14,123); West Lafayette, IN
February 4; 7:00 pm, ESPN2	No. 8	at Indiana	W 78–75	19–3 (7–3)	Assembly Hall (17,406); Bloomington, IN
February 9; 9:00 pm, ESPN	No. 6	at No. 10 Michigan State	W 76–64	20–3 (8–3)	Breslin Student Events Center (14,759); East Lansing, MI
February 13; 4:30 pm, BTN	No. 6	Iowa	W 63–40	21–3 (9–3)	Mackey Arena (14,123); West Lafayette, IN
February 17; 6:30 pm, BTN	No. 4	at No. 9 Ohio State	W 60–57	22–3 (10–3)	Jerome Schottenstein Center (19,049); Columbus, OH
February 20; 4:00 pm, ESPN	No. 4	Illinois	W 75–65	23–3 (11–3)	Mackey Arena (14,123); West Lafayette, IN
February 24; 8:30 pm, BTN	No. 3	at Minnesota	W 59–58	24–3 (12–3)	Williams Arena (14,625); Minneapolis, MN
February 28; 4:00 pm, CBS	No. 3	No. 14 Michigan State	L 44–53	24–4 (12–4)	Mackey Arena (14,123); West Lafayette, IN
March 3; 6:30 pm, BTN	No. 7	Indiana	W 74–55	25–4 (13–4)	Mackey Arena (14,123); West Lafayette, IN
March 6; 2:30 pm, BTN	No. 7	at Penn State	W 64–60	26–4 (14–4)	Bryce Jordan Center (8,865); State College, PA
Big Ten tournament
March 12*; 6:30 pm, BTN	No. 6	vs. Northwestern; Quarterfinals	W 69–61	27–4	Conseco Fieldhouse (N/A); Indianapolis, IN
March 13*; 4:10 pm, CBS	No. 6	vs. Minnesota; Semifinals	L 42–69	27–5	Conseco Fieldhouse (18,424); Indianapolis, IN
NCAA tournament South Region
March 19*; 2:30 pm, CBS	No. 10	vs. Siena; First Round	W 72–64	28–5	Spokane Veterans Memorial Arena (10,895); Spokane, WA
March 21*; 5:00 pm, CBS	No. 10	vs. No. 23 Texas A&M; Second Round	W 63–61 ^{OT}	29–5	Spokane Veterans Memorial Arena (11,036); Spokane, WA
March 26*; 9:57 pm, CBS	No. 10	vs. No. 3 Duke; Sweet Sixteen	L 57–70	29–6	Reliant Stadium (45,505); Houston, Texas
*Non-conference game. ^{#}Rankings from AP Poll. (#) Tournament seedings in parentheses. All times are in Eastern Time.

== Rankings ==
Ranking movements Legend: ██ Increase in ranking ██ Decrease in ranking
	Week																			
Poll	Pre	1	2	3	4	5	6	7	8	9	10	11	12	13	14	15	16	17	18	Final
AP	7	7	6	4	5	4	4	4	4	6	13	10	8	6	4	3	7	6	10	Not released
Coaches	7	7	6	6	5	4	4	4	4	6	15	12	7	6	4	3	6	5	11	12

== Gallery ==
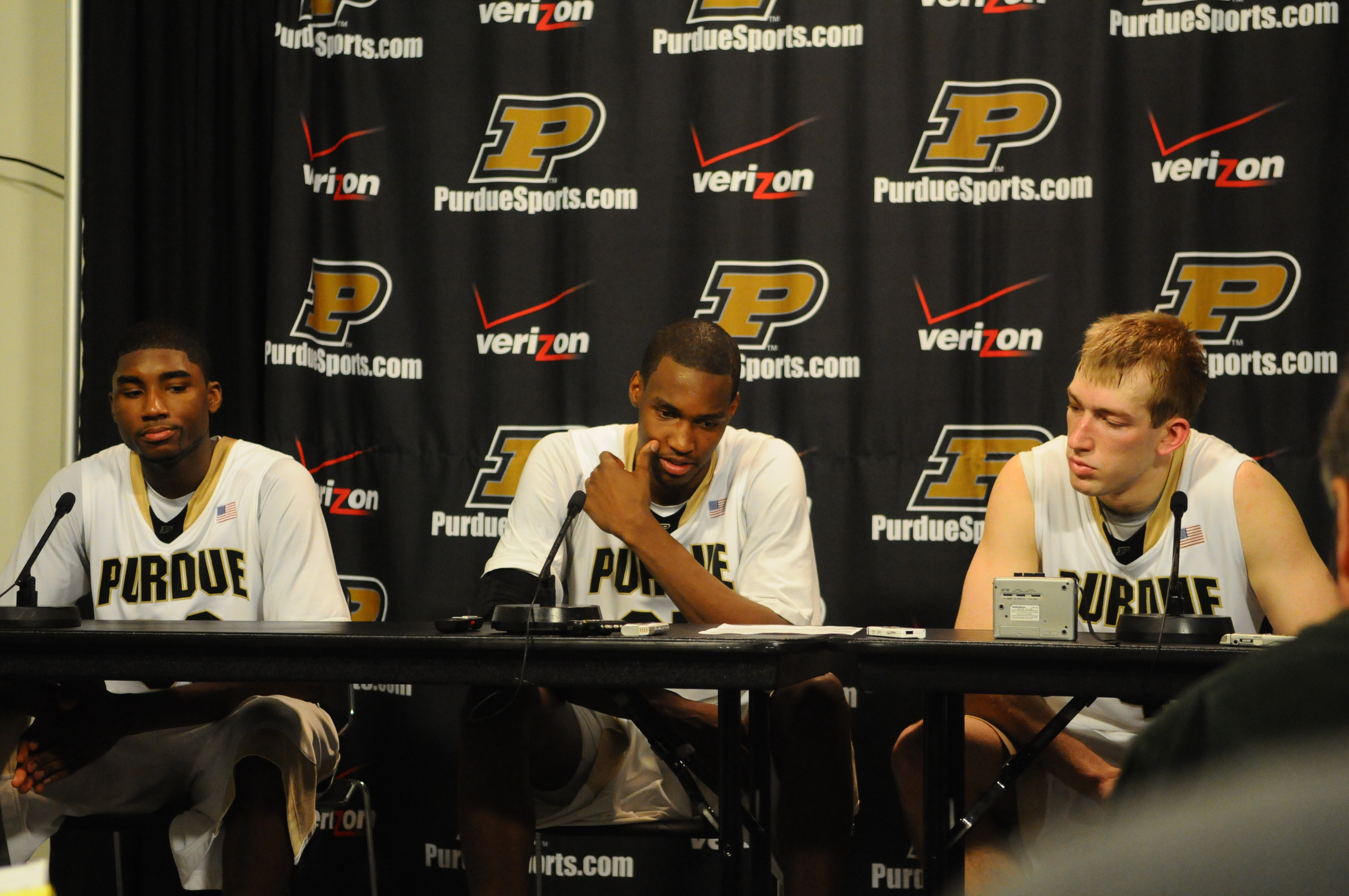
E'Twaun Moore, JaJuan Johnson and Robbie Hummel at press conference (2010-01-23)

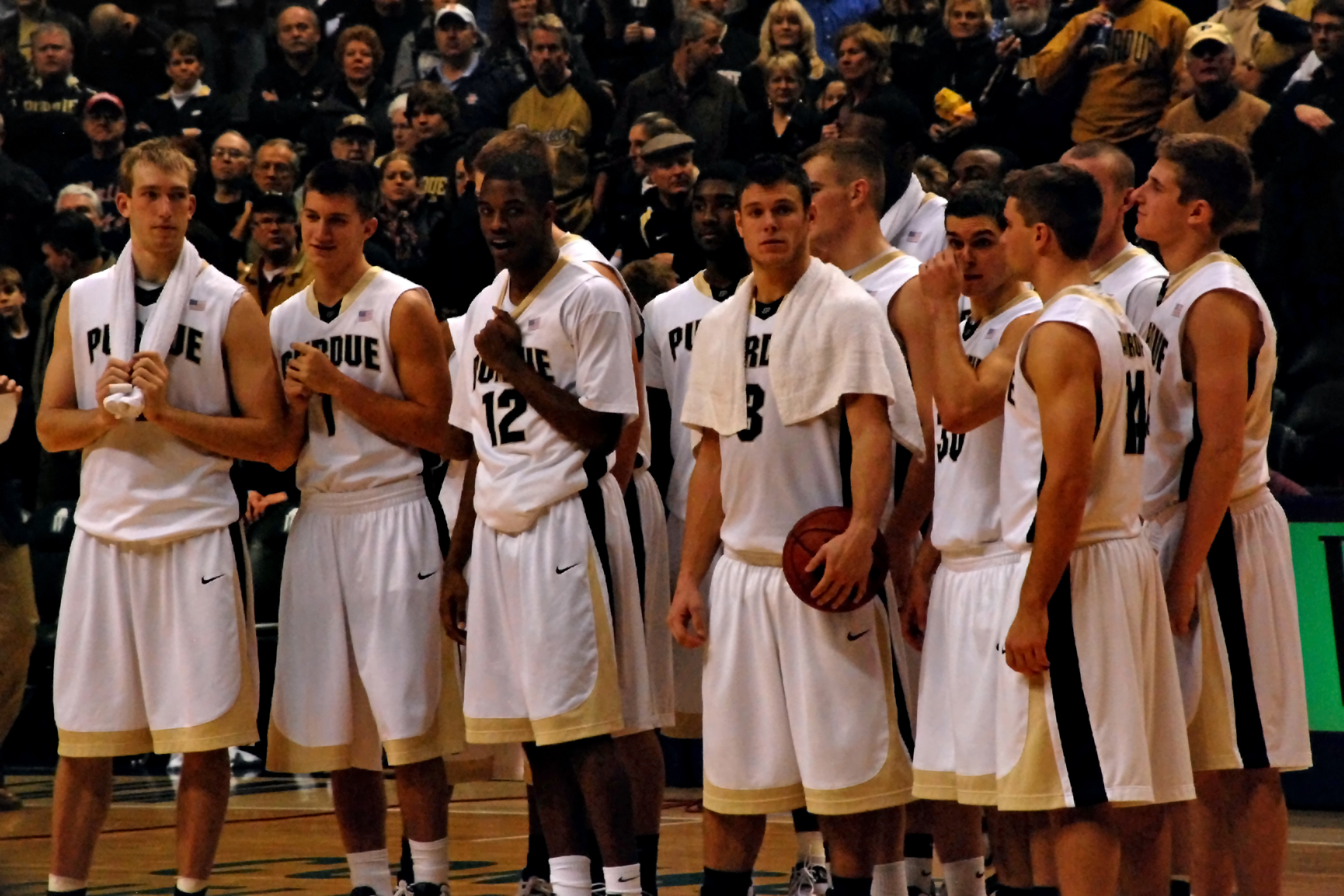
The Boilermakers after defeating Ball State in the 2009 Wooden Tradition.

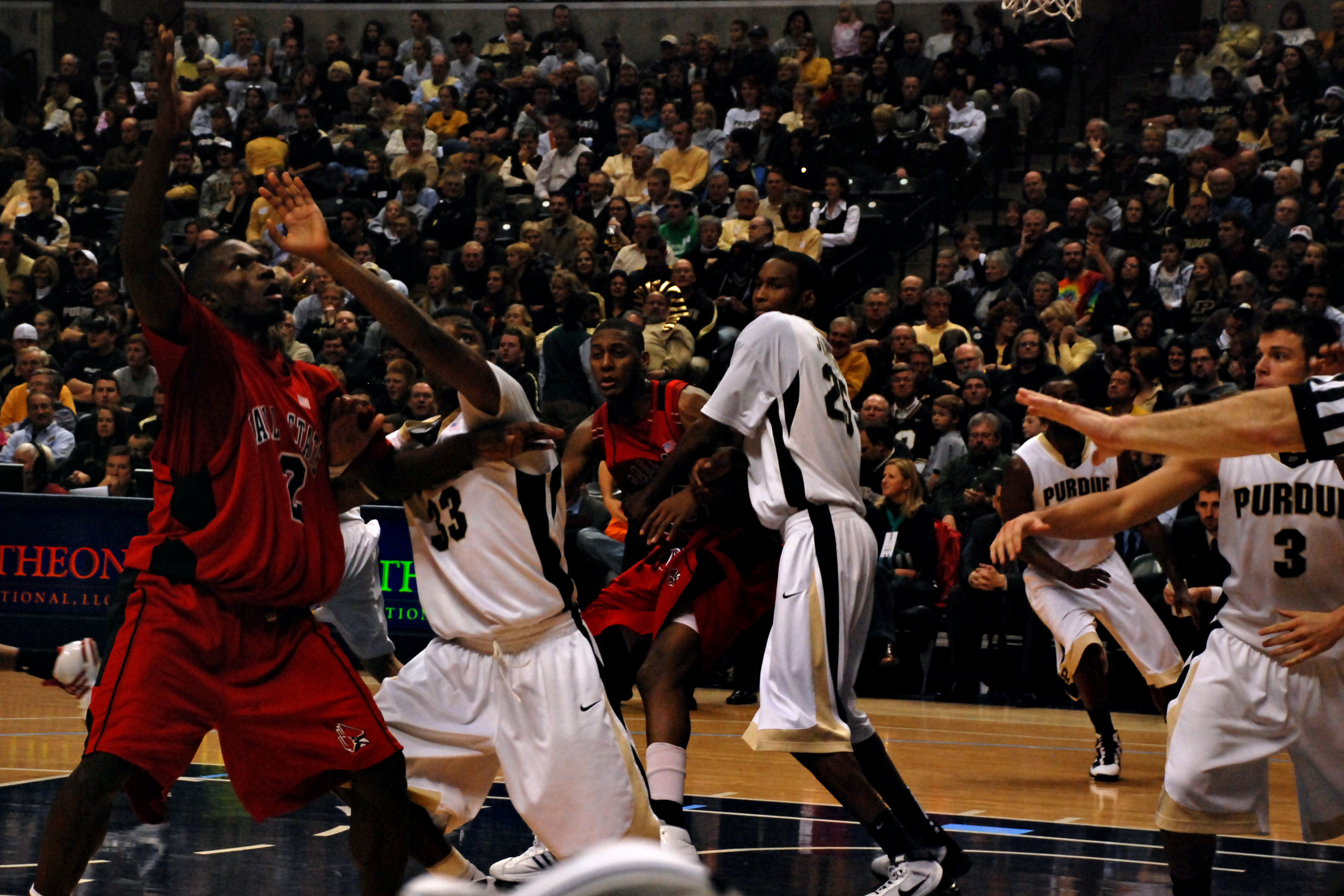
E'Twaun Moore, JaJuan Johnson and Chris Kramer on defense (2009-12-19)

== 2010 signing class ==
College recruiting information
Name	Hometown	School	Height	Weight	Commit date
Donnie Hale; PF	New Albany, IN	New Albany Senior High School	6 ft 7 in (2.01 m)	190 lb (86 kg)	Jun 23, 2009
Donnie Hale; PF	Recruit ratings: Scout: Rivals: (91)				
Anthony Johnson; SG	Chicago, IL	Whitney Young Magnet High School	6 ft 3 in (1.91 m)	175 lb (79 kg)	Oct 6, 2008
Anthony Johnson; SG	Recruit ratings: Scout: Rivals: (89)				
Terone Johnson; PG	Indianapolis, IN	North Central High School	6 ft 2 in (1.88 m)	180 lb (82 kg)	Sep 21, 2008
Terone Johnson; PG	Recruit ratings: Scout: Rivals: (92)				
Travis Carroll; C	Danville, IN	Danville Community High School	6 ft 9 in (2.06 m)	210 lb (95 kg)	Jun 21, 2008
Travis Carroll; C	Recruit ratings: Scout: Rivals: (93)				
Overall recruit ranking: Rivals: #9 ESPN: #9
Note: In many cases, Scout, Rivals, 247Sports, On3, and ESPN may conflict in their listings of height and weight.; In these cases, the average was taken. ESPN grades are on a 100-point scale.; Sources: "2010 Purdue Signees". Rivals.; "2010 Purdue Signees". Scout.; "2010 Purdue Signees". ESPN.; "Scout.com Team Recruiting Rankings". Scout.; "2010 Team Ranking". Rivals.

== See also ==
- 2010 NCAA Division I men's basketball tournament
- 2009-10 NCAA Division I men's basketball season
- 2009-10 NCAA Division I men's basketball rankings
- List of NCAA Division I institutions
