= Robbie Hummel =

American basketball player (born 1989)

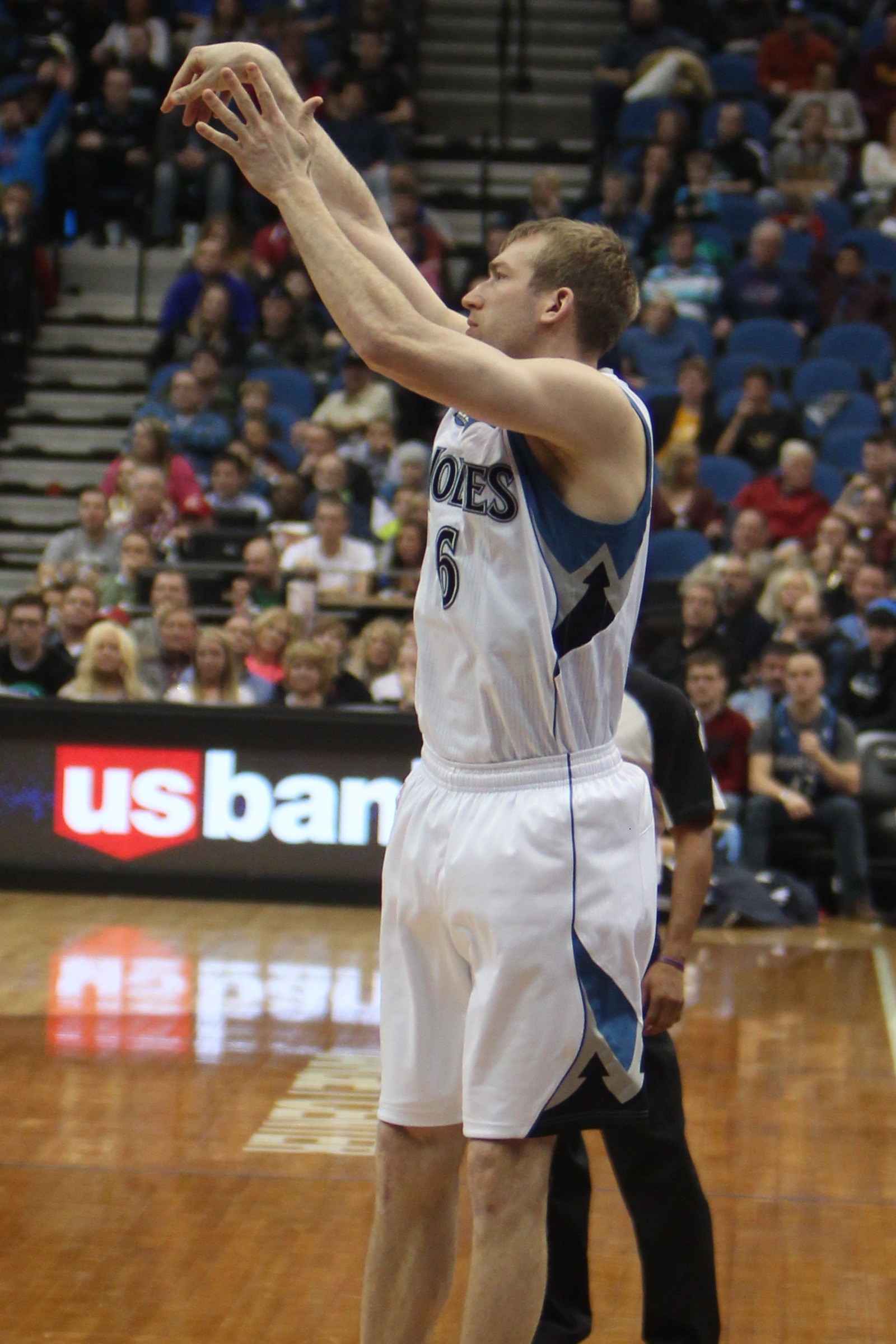
- Hummel with the Minnesota Timberwolves in 2014

Personal information
- Born: March 8, 1989 (age 37) Valparaiso, Indiana, U.S.
- Listed height: 6 ft 8 in (2.03 m)
- Listed weight: 215 lb (98 kg)

Career information
- High school: Valparaiso (Valparaiso, Indiana)
- College: Purdue (2007–2012)
- NBA draft: 2012: 2nd round, 58th overall pick
- Drafted by: Minnesota Timberwolves
- Playing career: 2012–2017
- Position: Small forward / power forward
- Number: 6, 4

Career history
- 2012–2013: Obradoiro CAB
- 2013–2015: Minnesota Timberwolves
- 2015–2016: EA7 Emporio Armani Milano
- 2016–2017: Khimki

Career highlights
- Senior CLASS Award (2012); Second-team All-American – NABC (2010); 2× AP Honorable Mention All-American (2010, 2012); 3× First-team All-Big Ten (2008, 2010, 2012); Third-team All-Big Ten (2009); Big Ten All-Freshman team (2008); Big Ten tournament MOP (2009); FIBA 3x3 World Cup champion (2019); FIBA 3x3 World Cup MVP (2019); USA Basketball Male Athlete of the Year (2019)
- Stats at NBA.com
- Stats at Basketball Reference
Medals
Men's basketball
Representing United States
Summer Universiade
Bronze medal – third place	2009 Belgrade	Team competition
Men's 3x3 basketball
Representing the United States
FIBA 3x3 World Cup
Gold medal – first place	2019 Amsterdam	National team

Robert John Hummel (born March 8, 1989) is an American professional basketball player and TV commentator. He played college basketball for Purdue University and for the Minnesota Timberwolves in the NBA. In 2019, Hummel was named USA Basketball Male Athlete of the Year. He has served as an analyst for the Big Ten Network and Fox Sports, and is a regular contributor for Westwood One Sports and SiriusXM. Robbie Hummel also works as a college basketball and NBA analyst for NBC Sports and CBS Sports.

== High school career ==
Hummel attended Valparaiso High School in Valparaiso, Indiana. Playing under coach Bob Punter, he played alongside his future college freshman teammate, Scott Martin (who transferred to the University of Notre Dame after one season at Purdue). Hummel averaged 15.7 points, 7.1 rebounds and 4.1 assists per game as a Viking during his senior season.

Considered a four-star recruit by Rivals.com, Hummel was listed as the No. 21 small forward and the No. 75 player in the nation in 2007.

== College career ==
=== 2007–2008 ===
Hummel attended Purdue University to play under head coach Matt Painter. He averaged 11.4 points (second on team), 6.1 rebounds (first) and 2.5 assists a game in his freshman year. Hummel led the "Baby Boilers", along with Chris Kramer, JaJuan Johnson, Keaton Grant, and E'Twaun Moore, to a second-place finish in conference play and on to a second-round NCAA tournament appearance, where they lost to a senior-led Xavier team. He broke the school freshman record with a 44.7 three-point field goal percentage, while leading the Big Ten Conference. He also recorded the highest free throw percentage for a freshman in school history with 86.5 percent accuracy, which led the team, and broke Kyle Macy's 33-year-old .859 mark. He was named First Team All-Big Ten, becoming the first true Boilermaker freshman to earn the honor. He finished his freshman season as one of 24 John R. Wooden Award finalists and of 10 finalists for the Oscar Robertson Trophy. He helped lead the Boilermakers to a 25–9 overall season record.

=== 2008–2009 ===
Hummel completed his sophomore season averaging close to 13 points (3rd on team) and 7 rebounds (1st) a game. As one of three tri-captains on the team and named the Preseason Big Ten Player of the Year, he scored his 500th career point on December 13, 2008, against Indiana State. Hummel opened the season with ten straight double-figure-scoring performances, totaling 19 on the season (15–4), which included four 20-plus-point performances (3–1). He won back-to-back Big Ten Player of the Week honors in the month of December, pulling down a career-high 14 rebounds and scoring 25 points during that time frame. He recorded two preseason double-doubles, with one coming against Stephen Curry's Davidson team. Hummel began battling with back spasms and a broken vertebra, which forced him to sit out five games and kept him from practice involvement. He had to wear a back brace in games following with limited minutes, while helping lead the Boilermakers to an 11–7 conference record, going 1–3 without him. Hummel led the Boilermakers to their first Big Ten tournament championship in school history and was named the most outstanding player of the tournament, following with a third straight NCAA tournament appearance and the program's first Sweet Sixteen appearance in 9 years. Finishing the season wearing a back brace, he scored a team high 17 points in the final game of the season against UConn in the regional semifinals. Although having dealt with performance affecting injuries and missing four conference games, he was named a Third Team-All Big Ten selection.

=== 2009–2010 ===
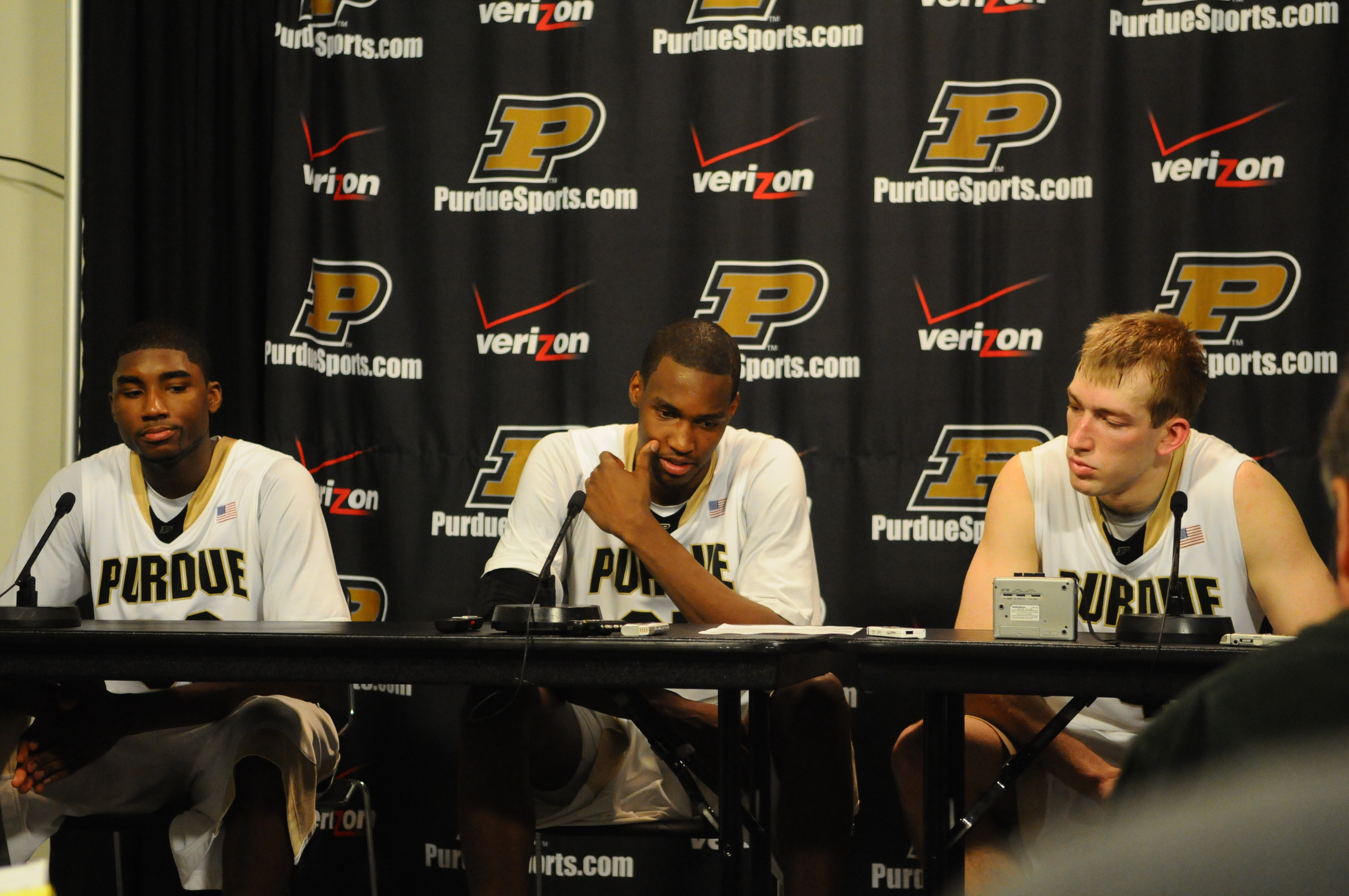
E'Twaun Moore, JaJuan Johnson and Hummel at press conference (January 23, 2010)

To start the 2009–10 season, Hummel was picked as one of fifty players as a preseason John R. Wooden Award candidate, along with teammate, E'Twaun Moore. He was a Preseason First Team All-Big Ten pick by both CBS Sports and Big Ten Network and a Preseason 2nd Team All-American pick by ESPN analysts, Doug Gottlieb and Jay Williams. Near mid-season, he was selected as one of thirty finalists for the Naismith Award. With MVP E'Twaun Moore, Hummel was named to the 2009 Paradise Jam All-Tournament Team after a victory over #10 Tennessee. During a school record-tying 14–0 season start on December 29, 2009, against Iowa, Hummel broke a school record, making 36 consecutive free throws, previously held by Jerry Sichting's 34, which was set three decades earlier. He tied his former assistant coach, Cuonzo Martin's single-game school record of 8 three-point field goals made in a losing effort against an Evan Turner-led Ohio State team on January 12, 2010, in which he also scored a career high 35 points and received a dislocated pinky finger. In his team's tenth straight win in conference play at Minnesota on February 24, Hummel injured his right knee in the first half after he slipped while attempting to plant his foot. He scored 11 points, making 3-of-4 three-pointers, in his prior twelve minutes of the game. Purdue officials reported the following day that Hummel tore his anterior cruciate ligament (ACL) and would miss the rest of the season. He finished the last five games as a junior perfect from the free throw line, making all 21 of his attempts.

Playing 30.3 minutes per game, he averaged 15.7 points (2nd on team), 6.9 rebounds (1st), 1.1 steals, 1 block, and 2.1 assists, while shooting 45.6 percent from the floor and led the Big Ten at 90.2 percent from the line, while also leading the nation amongst players at the forward position. He also shot 36.4 percent beyond the arc (2nd). Hummel scored at least 11 points in all but three games on the season (24–3), including ten straight, while recording eight double-doubles and being named a First Team All-Big Ten selection for the second time in his career at Purdue, while also being named a Fox Sports Third-Team All-American, a State Farm and NABC Second Team All-American, and an Associated Press Honorable Mention All-American. He averaged 16.2 points and 7.3 rebounds per game in Big Ten Conference play for the third-ranked team in the nation (12–3). Hummel received knee surgery and had to wait 4 to 6 months for the healing process.

=== 2010–2011 ===
After two consecutive seasons with performance-affecting injuries, Hummel was expected to return for his senior season. Fellow teammates JaJuan Johnson and E'Twaun Moore were returning as well, where they pulled out of the 2010 NBA draft to return for their senior season. At team practice on October 16, Hummel tore the same ACL and was forced to sit out and serve as an assistant for the 2010–11 season. Before the injury, Hummel was predicted as high as a Preseason Second Team All-American by much of the media.

=== 2011–2012 ===
Hummel returned to the team as a fifth-year redshirted senior. On October 19, 2011, he showed no effects from his injury during 3-on-3 fast-break drills in practice. Hummel was named one of 50 candidates for the John R. Wooden Award, as well as the #24 player on CBSSports.com Top 100 List and a Lowe's Senior CLASS Award candidate to open the season. On November 11, the Preseason All-Big Ten selection scored 21 points, making 5-of-7 beyond the arc to open the season against Northern Illinois in 20 minutes of play. On December 3 in a three-point loss at #11 Xavier, Hummel suffered from cramps and dehydration, which eventually caused him to fall to the floor in the last minute of the game. Hummel led Purdue to a 10–3 non-conference mark and onto a 10–8 conference record. Hummel led the Boilermakers with 16.4 points, 7.2 rebounds, and 1.2 blocks per contest, while averaging 2 assists and .7 steals. He scored in double figures in all but three games (1–2) this season, which included nine 20-plus-point games (7–2), while recording six double-doubles (4–2). On February 4, Hummel recorded a career-high 5 blocks in a home loss to #20 Indiana. On February 22, he scored a season-high 29 points in a home win against Nebraska. Following that game and a 17-point performance win at #11 Michigan, Hummel was named Big Ten Player of the Week. In his last game at Mackey Arena on February 29, Hummel recorded a career-high 6 assists, along with 26 points and 8 rebounds against Penn State. Throughout the month of February, Hummel led the nation in points scored. After the culmination of the regular season, Hummel was selected First Team All-Big Ten for the third time in his career, becoming the first Boilermaker since Rick Mount (1968–1970) to do so and the first Big Ten player since Mateen Cleaves. Hummel led the Boilermakers to a sixth straight NCAA tournament, losing in his final game to Final Four-bound Kansas in the third round by 3 points. Being guarded by Thomas Robinson, Hummel scored 22 points in the first half, finishing with 26 points and 9 rebounds. He was named an Associated Press Honorable Mention All-American and also won the Lowe's Senior CLASS Award and the Thomas A. Brady Comeback Award.

=== Career notes ===
Hummel became the 44th player in school history to score over 1,000 career points, surpassing the mark with a 13-point performance during a 73–66 loss on January 9, 2010. On December 23, 2011, at Iowa, Hummel became the tenth player in school history to tally 700 rebounds. His 90.2 free throw percentage on the 2009–10 season ranks second best in school history. On March 4, 2012, with a 16-point performance in a loss at Indiana, Hummel scored his 1,720th career point, placing him ninth in career points at Purdue. He finished his career with 1,772 points (9th), 862 rebounds (4th), 268 assists, 132 steals, 112 blocks, becoming the only Boilermaker to reach such numbers in each category.

== Professional career ==
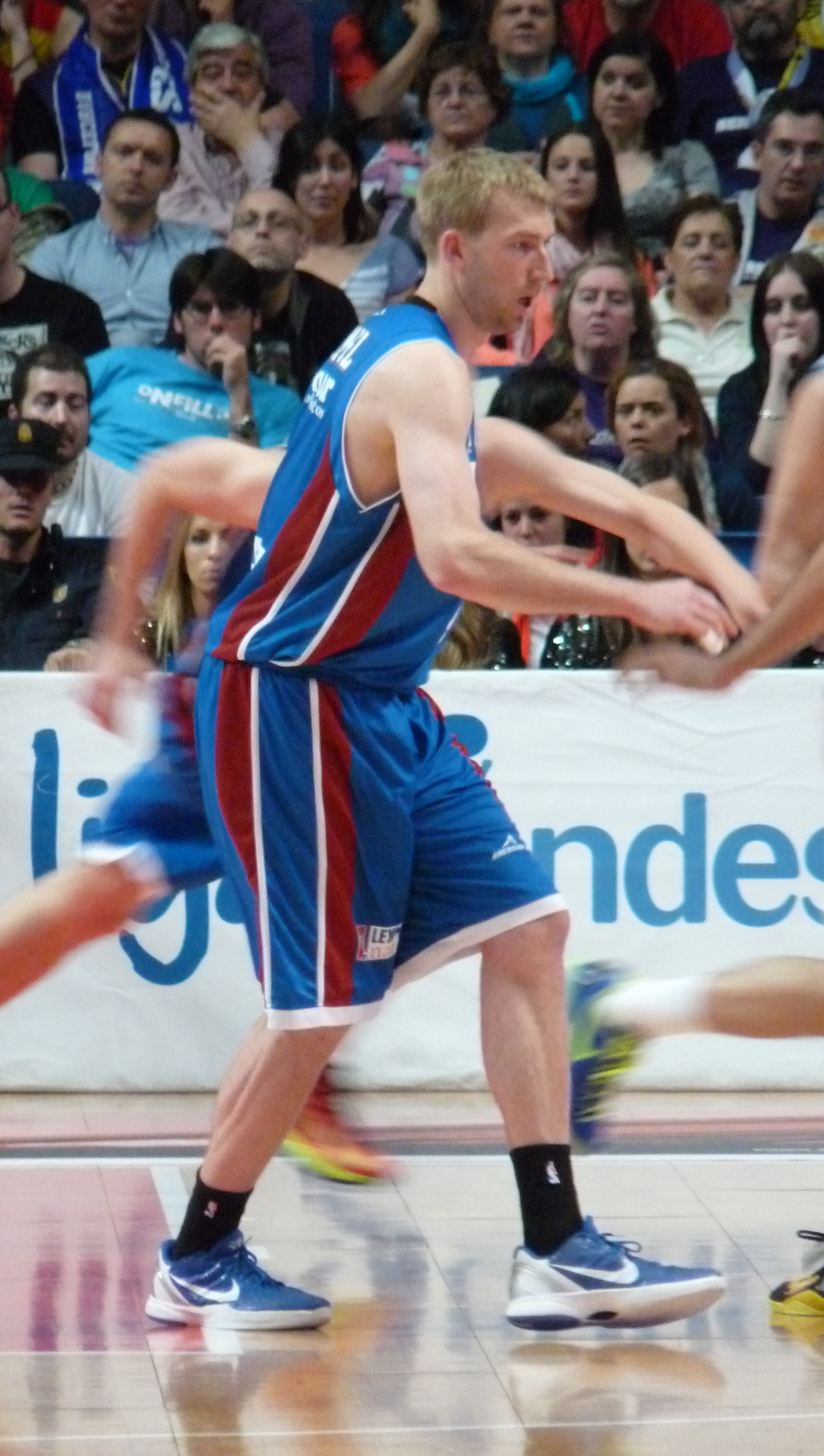
Hummel in 2013 for Obradoiro CAB

On June 28, 2012, Hummel was selected by the Minnesota Timberwolves with the 58th overall pick in the 2012 NBA draft. In July 2012, he joined the Timberwolves for the 2012 NBA Summer League. On August 8, 2012, Hummel signed a one-year deal with Blu:sens Monbús of Spain. In September 2012, he injured his right meniscus and was sidelined for two months.

In July 2013, Hummel re-joined the Minnesota Timberwolves for the 2013 NBA Summer League. On September 26, 2013, he signed with the Timberwolves, and he re-signed with them on July 22, 2014. On January 26, 2015, he was ruled out indefinitely after suffering a non-displaced fracture of the fourth metacarpal in his right hand.

On June 28, 2015, the Timberwolves tendered a qualifying offer to make Hummel a restricted free agent. However, they later withdrew the offer on July 6, thus parting ways with him.

On July 31, 2015, Hummel signed a one-year deal with Italian team EA7 Emporio Armani Milano. On February 5, 2016, he parted ways with Milano, after suffering a serious shoulder injury. He appeared in 11 games and had four starts in the Italian League, averaging 9.0 points and 5.0 rebounds in 22.4 minutes per game. He also played in nine games while having one start in Euroleague play, averaging 7.6 points, 4.0 rebounds and 1.0 assists per game.

On September 15, 2016, Hummel signed with the Denver Nuggets, but was waived on October 22 after appearing in seven preseason games. Seven days later, he signed with Russian club Khimki for the rest of the 2016–17 season.

== International career ==
With his lower back injury healing daily, Hummel was selected for the USA Men's 2009 World University Games in Belgrade, Serbia under Wisconsin head coach Bo Ryan. Along with the likes of fellow Big Ten players Evan Turner and Talor Battle, Hummel helped lead Team USA to the Bronze medal against Israel, finishing with a 6–1 record. Pulling down a team single-game-high ten rebounds, he averaged 7.3 points and 3.4 rebounds per game.

== Retirement and 3x3 career ==
On October 4, 2017, Hummel announced he was retiring from professional basketball in order to become a studio analyst and color commentator for ESPN and Big Ten Network. In 2017, Hummel signed a three-year broadcasting contract with multiple networks followed by a two-year deal with the same. Following the Big Ten's signing of a new media deal that included NBC and Fox and left out ESPN, Hummel signed with the two former networks and left the latter.

Hummel is a regular contributor on Westwood One Sports as well as SiriusXM.

For the 2026-2027 CHSN broadcasts of Chicago Bulls games, Hummel will be part of the rotation of color analysts, as a replacement for the late Stacey King, with play-by-play broadcaster Adam Amin.

=== 3x3 career ===
In 2019, Hummel joined Team Princeton 3X3 on the FIBA 3x3 World Tour. On June 23, 2019, Hummel won a gold medal at the 2019 FIBA 3x3 World Cup in Amsterdam.

== Personal life ==
In 2023, Hummel became engaged to actress Logan Andrews after proposing in the Bahamas.

== Career statistics ==
Legend
GP	Games played	GS	Games started	MPG	Minutes per game
FG%	Field goal percentage	3P%	3-point field goal percentage	FT%	Free throw percentage
RPG	Rebounds per game	APG	Assists per game	SPG	Steals per game
BPG	Blocks per game	PPG	Points per game	**Bold**	Career high

=== NBA ===
==== Regular season ====
Year	Team	GP	GS	MPG	FG%	3P%	FT%	RPG	APG	SPG	BPG	PPG
2013–14	Minnesota	**53**	**5**	12.4	.379	**.360**	**.938**	2.5	.4	.3	.0	3.4
2014–15	Minnesota	45	4	**16.5**	**.459**	.314	.828	**3.0**	**.6**	**.4**	**.2**	**4.4**
Career		98	9	14.3	.418	.343	.867	2.7	.5	.3	.1	3.9

== See also ==
- 2010 NCAA Men's Basketball All-Americans
- 2012 NCAA Men's Basketball All-Americans
