= 2009–10 Penn State Nittany Lions basketball team =

American college basketball season

2009–10 Penn State Nittany Lions men's basketball
- Conference: Big Ten Conference
- Record: 11–20 (3–15 Big Ten)
- Head coach: Ed DeChellis
- Assistant coaches: Kurt Kanaskie; Lewis Preston; Dan Earl
- Home arena: Bryce Jordan Center

2009–10 Big Ten Conference men's basketball standings
	Conf.				Overall
Team	W		L	PCT	W		L	PCT
No. 5 Ohio State†	14	–	4	.778	29	–	8	.784
No. 10 Purdue	14	–	4	.778	29	–	6	.829
No. 13 Michigan State	14	–	4	.778	28	–	9	.757
No. 16 Wisconsin	13	–	5	.722	24	–	9	.727
Illinois	10	–	8	.556	21	–	15	.583
Minnesota	9	–	9	.500	21	–	14	.600
Northwestern	7	–	11	.389	20	–	14	.588
Michigan	7	–	11	.389	15	–	17	.469
Indiana	4	–	14	.222	10	–	21	.323
Iowa	4	–	14	.222	10	–	22	.313
Penn State	3	–	15	.167	11	–	20	.355
† 2010 Big Ten tournament winner As of April 3, 2010; Rankings from AP Poll

The 2009–10 Penn State Nittany Lions basketball team represented Pennsylvania State University. Head Coach Ed DeChellis was in his seventh season with the team. The team played its home games in University Park, Pennsylvania at the Bryce Jordan Center, which has a capacity of 15,000, for the twelfth consecutive season. This season marked team's the seventeenth consecutive season as a member of the Big Ten Conference. The Nittany Lions entered the season as the defending NIT champions.

On November 30, 2009, the Nittany Lions became the first Big Ten team to win three straight games in the ACC – Big Ten Challenge when they defeated the Virginia Cavaliers. Penn State defeated Virginia Tech in 2007 and Georgia Tech in 2008. The Nittany Lions completed the regular season with an 11–19 (3–15) record.

As the 11 seed they lost in the first round of the 2010 Big Ten Conference men's basketball tournament to 6 seed Minnesota to end their season 11–20

== Current coaching staff ==
Position	Name	Year	Alma mater
Head coach	Ed DeChellis	2003	Penn State (1982)
Assistant coach	Kurt Kanaskie	2003	La Salle (1980)
Assistant coach	Lewis Preston	2008	VMI (1993)
Assistant coach	Dan Earl	2005	Penn State (1997)
Director of basketball operations	Jon Perry	2004	ETSU (2002)
Athletic trainer	Jon Salazer	2001	Penn State (1993)
Video coordinator	DJ Black	2008	Penn State (2006)
Strength and conditioning coach	Brad Pantall	2006	Penn State (1996)

== Roster ==
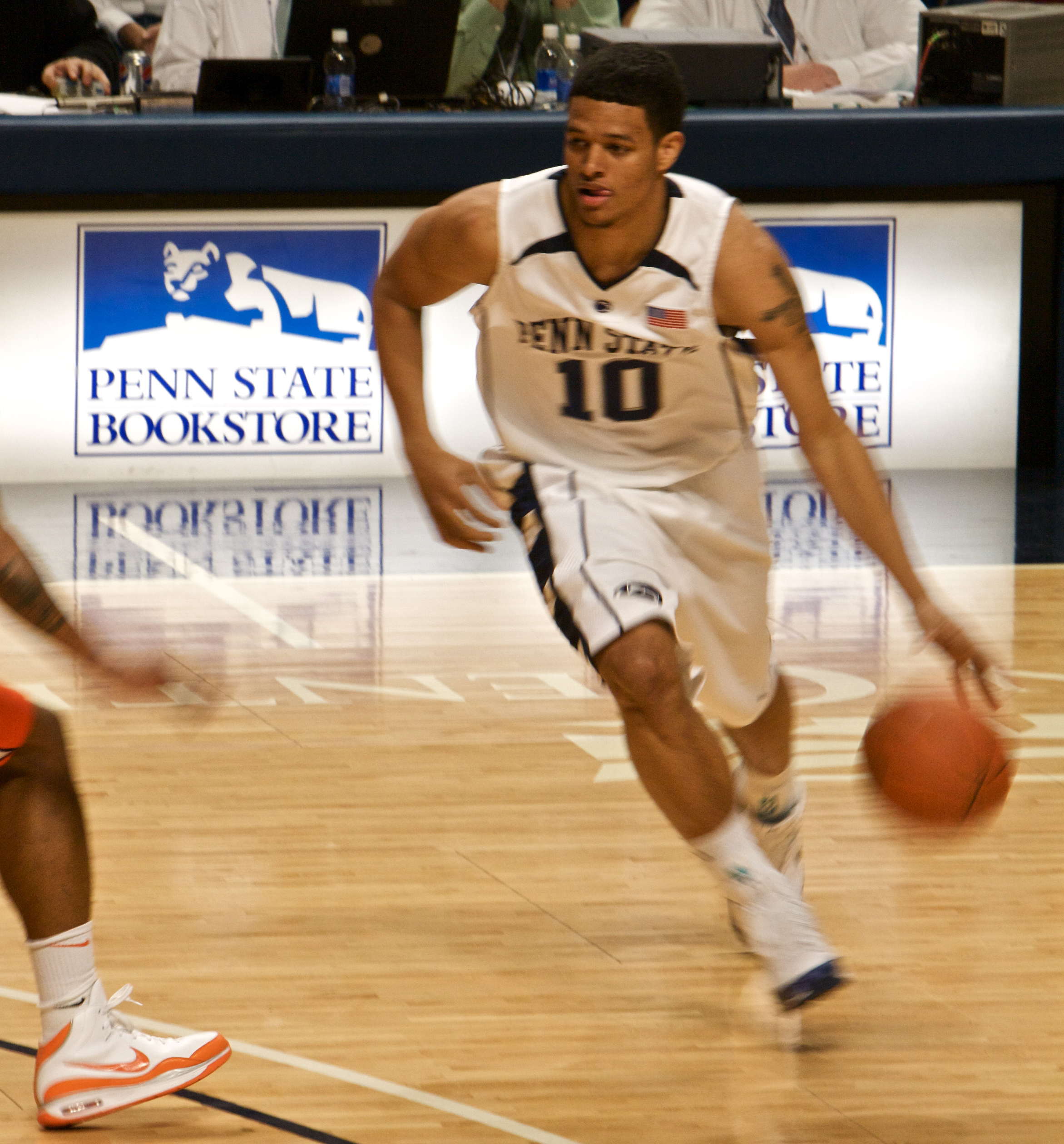
Chris Babb

Name	#	Position	Height	Weight	Year	Home Town
Justin Hamilton	2	Forward	6–5	200	Junior	Pittsburgh, PA
Jermaine Marshall	3	Guard	6–4	190	Freshman	Etters, PA
Chris Babb	10	Guard	6–5	215	Sophomore	Arlington, TX
Bill Edwards	11	Forward	6–6	235	Freshman	Middletown, OH
Talor Battle	12	Guard	6–0	170	Junior	Albany, NY
Joe Silko	13	Guard	5–11	165	Freshman	South Fayette, PA
Adam Highberger	14	Guard	6–2	180	RS Junior	Blairsville, PA
David Jackson	15	Forward	6–7	210	RS Junior	Farrell, PA
Saša Borovnjak	21	Forward	6–9	235	Freshman	Belgrade, Serbia
Andrew Jones	22	Forward	6–10	245	RS Junior	Philadelphia, PA
Tim Frazier	23	Guard	6–1	160	Freshman	Houston, TX
Cammeron Woodyard	24	Guard	6–5	210	Sophomore	Westminster, MD
Jeff Brooks	25	Forward	6–8	200	Junior	Louisville, KY
Ryan Harro	33	Guard	5–11	165	Freshman	New Fairfield, CT
Billy Oliver	35	Forward	6–8	215	RS Freshman	Chatham, NJ
Steve Kirkpatrick	41	Forward	6–5	225	Junior	Carlisle, PA
Andrew Ott	54	Forward	6–10	240	RS Junior	Abington, PA

== Schedule and results ==
Date time, TV	Rank^{#}	Opponent^{#}	Result	Record	Site (attendance) city, state
Exhibition
Nov 6*; 6:00 p.m., BTN.com		Slippery Rock	W 82–51		Bryce Jordan Center (—); University Park, PA
Non-conference regular season
Nov 13*; 7:30 p.m., BTN.com		Penn	W 70–55	1–0	Bryce Jordan Center (7,507); University Park, PA
Nov 16*; 7:30 p.m., BTN.com		Robert Morris	W 80–61	2–0	Bryce Jordan Center (6,286); University Park, PA
Nov 19*; 4:00 p.m., ESPNU		vs. UNC-Wilmington; Charleston Classic	L 69–80	2–1	Carolina First Arena (535); Charleston, SC
Nov 20*; 12:30 p.m., CSN		vs. Tulane; Charleston Classic	L 60–63	2–2	Carolina First Arena (—); Charleston, SC
Nov 22*; 10:00 a.m.		vs. Davidson; Charleston Classic	W 59–57	3–2	Carolina First Arena (—); Charleston, SC
Nov 25*; 6:00 p.m., BTN		Sacred Heart	W 87–75	4–2	Bryce Jordan Center (5,323); University Park, PA
Nov 30*; 7:00 p.m., ESPN2		at Virginia; ACC - Big Ten Challenge	W 69–66	5–2	John Paul Jones Arena (8,898); Charlottesville, VA
Dec 5*; 4:00 p.m.		at Temple	L 42–45	5–3	Liacouras Center (7,012); Philadelphia, PA
Dec 8*; 6:30 p.m., BTN		UMBC	W 58–42	6–3	Bryce Jordan Center (6,296); University Park, PA
Dec 12*; 7:00 p.m., ESPN2		Virginia Tech	L 64–66	6–4	Bryce Jordan Center (11,237); University Park, PA
Dec 19*; 9:00 p.m., ESPNU		Gardner-Webb	W 104–57	7–4	Bryce Jordan Center (4,697); University Park, PA
Dec 21*; 5:00 pm, BTN.com		American	W 76–57	8–4	Bryce Jordan Center (7,561); University Park, PA
Big Ten regular season
Dec 29; 9:00 p.m., ESPN2		at Minnesota	L 70–75	8–5 (0–1)	Williams Arena (14,625); Minneapolis, MN
Jan 3; 2:00 p.m., BTN		No. 23 Wisconsin	L 46–63	8–6 (0–2)	Bryce Jordan Center (8,114); University Park, PA
Jan 7; 7:00 p.m., ESPN2		Michigan	L 55–64	8–7 (0–3)	Bryce Jordan Center (5,799); University Park, PA
Jan 12; 9:00 p.m., BTN		at Illinois	L 53–54	8–8 (0–4)	Assembly Hall (14,469); Champaign, IL
Jan 16; 1:00 p.m., BTN		at Iowa	L 64–67	8–9 (0–5)	Carver-Hawkeye Arena (9,651); Iowa City, IA
Jan 21; 7:00 p.m., ESPN2		Indiana	L 61–67	8–10 (0–6)	Bryce Jordan Center (8,251); University Park, PA
Jan 24; 2:30 p.m., BTN		at No. 18 Wisconsin	L 71–79 ^{OT}	8–11 (0–7)	Kohl Center (17,230); Madison, WI
Jan 27; 6:30 p.m., BTN		Illinois	L 67–77	8–12 (0–8)	Bryce Jordan Center (8,085); University Park, PA
Jan 31; 3:00 p.m., BTN		at Purdue	L 46–66	8–13 (0–9)	Mackey Arena (14,123); West Lafayette, IN
Feb 3; 6:30 p.m., BTN		at No. 13 Ohio State	L 62–75	8–14 (0–10)	Value City Arena (14,148); Columbus, OH
Feb 6; 2:00 p.m., BTN		Minnesota	L 64–66	8–15 (0–11)	Bryce Jordan Center (10,291); University Park, PA
Feb 13; 12:00 p.m., ESPN		No. 10 Michigan State	L 54–65	8–16 (0–12)	Bryce Jordan Center (14,017); University Park, PA
Feb 17; 8:30 p.m., BTN		at Northwestern	W 81–70	9–16 (1–12)	Welsh-Ryan Arena (4,175); Evanston, IL
Feb 20; 6:00 p.m., BTN		at Michigan	W 55–51	10–16 (2–12)	Crisler Arena (13,751); Ann Arbor, MI
Feb 24; 6:30 p.m., BTN		No. 9 Ohio State	L 67–75	10–17 (2–13)	Bryce Jordan Center (8,721); University Park, PA
Feb 28; 12:00 p.m., BTN		Northwestern	W 79–60	11–17 (3–13)	Bryce Jordan Center (9,352); University Park, PA
Mar 4; 7:00 p.m., ESPN2		at No. 11 Michigan State	L 65–67	11–18 (3–14)	Breslin Center (14,759); East Lansing, MI
Mar 6; 2:30 p.m., BTN		No. 7 Purdue	L 60–64	11–19 (3–15)	Bryce Jordan Center (8,865); University Park, PA
Big Ten tournament
Mar 11; 7:30 p.m., BTN	(11)	vs. (6) Minnesota; First round	L 55–76	11–20	Conseco Fieldhouse (—); Indianapolis, IN
*Non-conference game. ^{#}Rankings from AP Poll. (#) Tournament seedings in parentheses.
