= 2009–10 Michigan State Spartans men's basketball team =

American college basketball season

2009–10 Michigan State Spartans men's basketball

Big Ten regular season co-champions

NCAA tournament, Final Four
- Conference: Big Ten Conference

Ranking
- Coaches: No. 4
- AP: No. 13
- Record: 28–9 (14–4 Big Ten)
- Head coach: Tom Izzo (15th season)
- Associate head coach: Mark Montgomery (9th season)
- Assistant coaches: Dwayne Stephens (7th season); Mike Garland (3rd season)
- Captains: Isaiah Dahlman; Draymond Green; Kalin Lucas; Raymar Morgan
- Home arena: Breslin Center

2009–10 Big Ten Conference men's basketball standings
	Conf.				Overall
Team	W		L	PCT	W		L	PCT
No. 5 Ohio State†	14	–	4	.778	29	–	8	.784
No. 10 Purdue	14	–	4	.778	29	–	6	.829
No. 13 Michigan State	14	–	4	.778	28	–	9	.757
No. 16 Wisconsin	13	–	5	.722	24	–	9	.727
Illinois	10	–	8	.556	21	–	15	.583
Minnesota	9	–	9	.500	21	–	14	.600
Northwestern	7	–	11	.389	20	–	14	.588
Michigan	7	–	11	.389	15	–	17	.469
Indiana	4	–	14	.222	10	–	21	.323
Iowa	4	–	14	.222	10	–	22	.313
Penn State	3	–	15	.167	11	–	20	.355
† 2010 Big Ten tournament winner As of April 3, 2010; Rankings from AP Poll

The 2009–10 Michigan State Spartans men's basketball team represented Michigan State University in the 2009–10 NCAA Division I men's basketball season. Their head coach was Tom Izzo who was in his 15th year. The Spartans played their home games at the Breslin Center in East Lansing, Michigan and were members of the Big Ten Conference. MSU finished the season 28–9, 14–4 in Big Ten play to earn a share of the Big Ten regular season championship for the 12th time in school history. They lost to Minnesota in the quarterfinals of the Big Ten tournament. The Spartans received an at-large bid to the NCAA tournament as a No. 5 seed, their 13th consecutive trip to the NCAA Tournament under Izzo. They defeated New Mexico State, Maryland, Northern Iowa, and Tennessee to advance to the Final Four. In the Final Four, the Spartans' sixth trip to the Final Four under Izzo, they lost to Butler.

== Previous season ==
The Spartans finished the 2008–09 season 31–7, 15–3 in Big Ten play to win the Big Ten regular season championship. Michigan State received a No. 2 seed in the NCAA tournament, their 12th straight trip to the Tournament, and advanced to the National Championship game, their second trip to the title game under Tom Izzo, before losing to North Carolina.

== Offseason ==
The Spartans lost Goran Suton (10.4 points and 8.4 rebounds per game) to the NBA draft following the season.

=== 2009 recruiting class ===
College recruiting
Name	Hometown	School	Height	Weight	Commit date
Garrick Sherman #12 C	Kenton, Ohio	Kenton High School	6 ft 10 in (2.08 m)	220 lb (100 kg)	Sep 19, 2008
Garrick Sherman #12 C	Recruit ratings: Scout: Rivals: (90)				
Derrick Nix #10 C	Detroit	Pershing High School	6 ft 9 in (2.06 m)	275 lb (125 kg)	Apr 21, 2008
Derrick Nix #10 C	Recruit ratings: Scout: Rivals: (91)				
Overall recruit ranking: Scout: Not Ranked Rivals: Not Ranked
Note: In many cases, Scout, Rivals, 247Sports, On3, and ESPN may conflict in their listings of height and weight.; In these cases, the average was taken. ESPN grades are on a 100-point scale.; Sources: "Michigan State Commit List for 2009". Rivals.; "Men's Basketball Recruiting". Scout.; "ESPN – Michigan State Spartans Basketball Recruiting 2009". ESPN.; "Scout.com Team Recruiting Rankings". Scout.; "2009 Team Ranking". Rivals.

== Season summary ==
Michigan State was led by junior Kalin Lucas (14.8 points and 4 assists per game), senior Raymar Morgan (11.3 points and 6.2 rebounds per game), and sophomore Draymond Green (9.9 points, 7.7 rebounds, and 3 assists per game). The Spartans began the season ranked No. 2 in the polls following their trip to the National Championship game in 2009. MSU competed in the Legends Classic and were upset by Florida in the semifinals. In the third place game, the Spartans routed UMass. MSU fell to again to No. 10 North Carolina in the ACC–Big Ten Challenge in a rematch of the prior year's National Championship game. The Spartans finished the non-conference schedule at 10–3, also losing at No. 2 Texas. The Spartans were ranked No. 11 in the country entering the Big Ten regular season.

The Spartans began the Big Ten season on fire, winning their first nine games, with wins over No. 25 Northwestern and No. 17 Wisconsin in the first two games. The winning streak ended with three straight losses to Wisconsin, Illinois, and No. 6 Purdue. The Spartans rebounded to finish 14–4 in Big Ten play and capture a share of the Big Ten regular season title. Michigan State completed the regular season at 24–7 and ranked 11th in the country. As the No. 3 seed in the Big Ten tournament, they were defeated in overtime by No. 6 seed Minnesota in the quarterfinals.

The Spartans received an at-large bid to the NCAA Tournament, their 13th straight appearance, earning a No. 5 seed in the Midwest Region. Lucas scored a career high 25 points to pull off a controversial win against New Mexico State in the First Round. In the Second Round, Lucas went down with a serious knee injury and the Spartans needed a three-point shot from Korie Lucious at the buzzer to advance past Maryland. Without Lucas for the remainder of the Tournament, MSU beat Northern Iowa and Tennessee to advance to their second consecutive Final Four and sixth in the last twelve years. In the National Semifinal, they were defeated by National Runner-Up, Butler.

== Roster ==
2009–10 Michigan State Spartans men's basketball team
Players
Coaches

Pos.	#	Name	Height	Weight	Year	Previous school	Hometown
G	3	Chris Allen	6 ft 3 in (1.91 m)	205 lb (93 kg)	Jr	Meadowcreek H.S.	Lawrenceville, Georgia
F	25	Jon Crandell (W)	6 ft 8 in (2.03 m)	230 lb (104 kg)	Sr	Rochester Adams H.S.	Rochester Hills, Michigan
G	22	Isaiah Dahlman (C)	6 ft 6 in (1.98 m)	195 lb (88 kg)	Sr	Braham Area Sec.	Braham, Minnesota
F	23	Draymond Green (C)	6 ft 6 in (1.98 m)	235 lb (107 kg)	So	Saginaw H.S.	Saginaw, Michigan
C	40	Tom Herzog	7 ft 0 in (2.13 m)	250 lb (113 kg)	RS Jr	Luke M. Powers Catholic H.S.	Flint, Michigan
C	44	Anthony Ianni	6 ft 9 in (2.06 m)	260 lb (118 kg)	Jr	Okemos H.S. (Grand Valley State)	East Lansing, Michigan
G	20	Mike Kebler (W)	6 ft 4 in (1.93 m)	205 lb (93 kg)	Jr	Okemos H.S.	Okemos, Michigan
G	1	Kalin Lucas (C)	6 ft 0 in (1.83 m)	190 lb (86 kg)	Jr	St. Mary Preparatory School	Detroit, Michigan
G	34	Korie Lucious	5 ft 11 in (1.8 m)	170 lb (77 kg)	So	Pius XI H.S.	Milwaukee, Wisconsin
F	2	Raymar Morgan	6 ft 8 in (2.03 m)	230 lb (104 kg)	Sr	McKinley H.S.note=C	Canton, Ohio
C	50	Derrick Nix	6 ft 8 in (2.03 m)	280 lb (127 kg)	Fr	Pershing H.S.	Detroit, Michigan
F	10	Delvon Roe	6 ft 8 in (2.03 m)	230 lb (104 kg)	So	St. Edward H.S.	Lakewood, Ohio
C	41	Garrick Sherman	6 ft 10 in (2.08 m)	235 lb (107 kg)	Fr	Kenton H.S.	Kenton, Ohio
G	15	Durrell Summers	6 ft 4 in (1.93 m)	205 lb (93 kg)	Jr	Covenant H.S.	Detroit, Michigan
G	13	Austin Thornton	6 ft 5 in (1.96 m)	220 lb (100 kg)	RS So	Cedar Springs H.S.	Sand Lake, Michigan

Head coach

- Tom Izzo (Northern Michigan)

Assistant coach(es)

- Mark Montgomery (Michigan State)
- Dwayne Stephens (Michigan State)
- Mike Garland (Northern Michigan)

Legend

- (C) Team captain
- (S) Suspended
- (I) Ineligible
- (W) Walk-on
- Injured
- Current redshirt

Roster
Last update: 6 November 2009

== Schedule and results ==
Date time, TV	Rank^{#}	Opponent^{#}	Result	Record	Site (attendance) city, state
Non-conference regular season
Nov 13, 2009*; 7:00 pm, ESPN360	No. 2	Florida Gulf Coast	W 97–58	1–0	Breslin Center (14,759); East Lansing, MI
Nov 17, 2009*; 8:00 pm, ESPN	No. 2	Gonzaga	W 75–71	2–0	Breslin Center (14,759); East Lansing, MI
Nov 20, 2009*; 6:30 pm, BTN	No. 2	Toledo; Legends Classic	W 75–62	3–0	Breslin Center (14,759); East Lansing, MI
Nov 22, 2009*; 12:00 pm, BTN	No. 2	Valparaiso; Legends Classic	W 90–60	4–0	Breslin Center (14,759); East Lansing, MI
Nov 27, 2009*; 8:00 pm, HDNet	No. 2	vs. Florida; Legends Classic	L 74–77	4–1	Boardwalk Hall (5,154); Atlantic City, NJ
Nov 28, 2009*; 5:30 pm, HDNet	No. 2	vs. Massachusetts; Legends Classic	W 106–68	5–1	Boardwalk Hall (3,626); Atlantic City, NJ
Dec 1, 2009*; 9:00 pm, ESPN	No. 9	at No. 10 North Carolina	L 82–89	5–2	Dean Smith Center (21,346); Chapel Hill, NC
Dec 4, 2009*; 7:00 pm, BTN	No. 9	Wofford	W 72–60	6–2	Breslin Center (14,759); East Lansing, MI
Dec 7, 2009*; 7:00 pm, ESPNU	No. 12	at The Citadel	W 69–56	7–2	McAlister Field House (5,194); Charleston, SC
Dec 10, 2009*; 7:00 pm, BTN	No. 12	Oakland	W 88–57	8–2	Breslin Center (14,759); East Lansing, MI
Dec 19, 2009*; 12:00 pm, BTN	No. 12	IPFW	W 80–58	9–2	Breslin Center (14,759); East Lansing, MI
Dec 22, 2009*; 9:00 pm, ESPN2	No. 9	at No. 2 Texas	L 68–79	9–3	Frank Erwin Center (16,734); Austin, TX
Dec 30, 2009*; 7:00 pm, BTN	No. 11	Texas-Arlington	W 87–68	10–3	Breslin Center (14,759); East Lansing, MI
Big Ten regular season
Jan 2, 2010; 6:30 pm, BTN	No. 11	at No. 25 Northwestern	W 91–70	11–3 (1–0)	Welsh-Ryan Arena (8,117); Evanston, IL
Jan 6, 2010; 6:30 pm, BTN	No. 10	No. 17 Wisconsin	W 54–47	12–3 (2–0)	Breslin Center (14,759); East Lansing, MI
Jan 9, 2010; 5:30 pm, BTN	No. 10	at Iowa	W 71–53	13–3 (3–0)	Carver–Hawkeye Arena (9,924); Iowa City, IA
Jan 13, 2010; 6:30 pm, BTN	No. 7	Minnesota	W 60–53	14–3 (4–0)	Breslin Center (14,759); East Lansing, MI
Jan 16, 2010; 3:30 pm, CBS	No. 7	Illinois	W 73–63	15–3 (5–0)	Breslin Center (14,759); East Lansing, MI
Jan 20, 2010; 6:30 pm, BTN	No. 6	Iowa	W 70–63	16–3 (6–0)	Breslin Center (14,759); East Lansing, MI
Jan 23, 2010; 12:00 pm, CBS	No. 6	at Minnesota	W 65–64	17–3 (7–0)	Williams Arena (14,625); Minneapolis
Jan 26, 2010; 7:00 pm, ESPN	No. 5	at Michigan; Rivalry	W 57–56	18–3 (8–0)	Crisler Arena (13,751); Ann Arbor, MI
Jan 30, 2010; 7:00 pm, BTN	No. 5	Northwestern	W 79–70	19–3 (9–0)	Breslin Center (14,759); East Lansing, MI
Feb 2, 2010; 9:00 pm, ESPN	No. 5	at No. 16 Wisconsin	L 49–67	19–4 (9–1)	Kohl Center (17,230); Madison, WI
Feb 6, 2010; 9:00 pm, ESPN	No. 5	at Illinois; ESPN College GameDay	L 73–78	19–5 (9–2)	Assembly Hall (16,618); Champaign, IL
Feb 9, 2010; 9:00 pm, ESPN	No. 10	No. 6 Purdue	L 64–76	19–6 (9–3)	Breslin Center (14,759); East Lansing, MI
Feb 13, 2010; 12:00 pm, ESPN	No. 10	at Penn State	W 65–54	20–6 (10–3)	Bryce Jordan Center (14,017); University Park, PA
Feb 16, 2010; 7:00 pm, ESPN	No. 11	at Indiana	W 72–58	21–6 (11–3)	Assembly Hall (16,075); Bloomington, IN
Feb 21, 10; 12:00 pm, CBS	No. 11	No. 9 Ohio State	L 67–74	21–7 (11–4)	Breslin Center (14,759); East Lansing, MI
Feb 28, 2010; 4:00 pm, CBS	No. 14	at No. 3 Purdue	W 53–44	22–7 (12–4)	Mackey Arena (14,123); West Lafayette, IN
Mar 4, 2010; 7:00 pm, ESPN	No. 11	Penn State	W 67–65	23–7 (13–4)	Breslin Center (14,759); East Lansing, MI
Mar 7, 2010; 4:00 pm, CBS	No. 11	Michigan; Rivalry	W 64–48	24–7 (14–4)	Breslin Center (14,759); East Lansing, MI
Big Ten tournament
Mar 12, 2010; 8:55 pm, BTN	(3) No. 11	vs. (6) Minnesota quarterfinals	L 67–72 ^{OT}	24–8	Conseco Fieldhouse (17,563); Indianapolis, IN
NCAA tournament
Mar 19, 2010*; 7:35 pm, CBS	(5 MW) No. 13	vs. (12 MW) New Mexico State; First Round	W 70–67	25–8	Spokane Veterans Memorial Arena (10,851); Spokane, WA
Mar 21, 2010*; 2:30 pm, CBS	(5 MW) No. 13	vs. (4 MW) No. 20 Maryland; Second Round	W 85–83	26–8	Spokane Veterans Memorial Arena (11,015); Spokane, WA
Mar 26, 2010*; 9:37 pm, CBS	(5 MW) No. 13	vs. (9 MW) Northern Iowa; Sweet Sixteen	W 59–52	27–8	Edward Jones Dome (26,377); St. Louis, MO
Mar 28, 2010*; 2:37pm, CBS	(5 MW) No. 13	vs. (6 MW) No. 15 Tennessee; Elite Eight	W 70–69	28–8	Edward Jones Dome (25,242); St. Louis, MO
Apr 3, 2010*; 6:07 pm, CBS	(5 MW) No. 13	vs. (5 W) No. 11 Butler; Final Four	L 50–52	28–9	Lucas Oil Stadium (71,298); Indianapolis, IN
*Non-conference game. ^{#}Rankings from AP Poll. (#) Tournament seedings in parentheses. All times are in Eastern Time; Source.

== Player statistics ==
Individual player statistics (Final)
		Minutes		Scoring		Total FGs			3-point FGs			Free-Throws			Rebounds							
Player	GP	Tot	Avg	Pts	Avg	FG	FGA	Pct	3FG	3FA	Pct	FT	FTA	Pct	Off	Def	Tot	Avg	A	Stl	Blk	Tov
Allen, Chris	36	917	25.5	296	8.2	105	244	.430	53	133	.398	33	45	.733	32	69	101	2.8	73	16	3	52
Crandell, Jon	12	17	1.4	0	0.0	0	2	.000	0	0		0	0		0	2	2	0.2	1	0	1	1
Dahlman, Isaiah	22	88	4.0	29	1.3	12	20	.600	3	8	.375	2	2	1.000	2	7	9	0.4	3	2	0	3
Green, Draymond	37	945	25.5	366	9.9	139	265	.525	2	16	.125	86	128	.672	81	205	286	7.7	112	45	34	62
Herzog, Tom	15	55	3.7	20	1.3	9	11	.818	0	0		2	4	.500	9	9	18	1.2	0	2	3	6
Kebler, Mike	25	103	4.1	8	0.3	1	10	.100	0	1	.000	6	10	.600	3	10	13	0.5	9	2	1	6
Lucas, Kalin	33	1027	31.1	490	14.8	165	364	.453	35	99	.354	125	162	.772	22	40	62	1.9	131	40	2	80
Lucious, Korie	36	825	22.9	201	5.6	70	205	.341	44	139	.317	17	23	.739	11	50	61	1.7	118	27	5	68
Morgan, Raymar	36	979	27.2	407	11.3	154	291	.529	5	17	.294	94	140	.671	77	145	222	6.2	63	38	25	69
Nix, Derrick	36	279	7.8	83	2.3	35	69	.507	0	0		13	48	.271	34	42	76	2.1	9	7	6	13
Roe, Delvon	37	764	20.6	238	6.5	83	150	.553	0	0		72	109	.661	68	117	185	5.0	43	31	35	50
Sherman, Garrick	36	259	7.2	69	1.9	31	52	.596	0	0		7	11	.63	18	39	57	1.6	3	4	5	18
Sims, Dion	1	1	1.0	0	0.0	0	1	.000	0	0		0	0		0	0	0	0.0	0	0	0	0
Summers, Durrell	37	971	9.3	417	11.3	156	343	.455	43	120	.358	62	78	.795	56	118	174	0.7	31	25	3	65
Thornton, Austin	33	195	1.2	34	1.0	14	41	.341	2	10	.200	4	4	1.000	14	21	35	0.1	10	3	0	13

Legend
GP	Games played	Avg	Average per game
FG	Field-goals made	FGA	Field-goal attempts	Off	Offensive rebounds
Def	Defensive rebounds	A	Assists	TO	Turnovers
Blk	Blocks	Stl	Steals	High	Team high

== Rankings ==
Ranking movements Legend: ██ Increase in ranking ██ Decrease in ranking ( ) = First-place votes
	Week																			
Poll	Pre	1	2	3	4	5	6	7	8	9	10	11	12	13	14	15	16	17	18	Final
AP	2 (5)	2 (5)	2 (7)	9	12	12	9	11	10	7	6	5	5	10	11	14	11	11	13	Not released
Coaches	2 (3)	2 (3)	2 (2)	9	14	12	9	11	11	8	7	5	5	10	11	14	12	11	12	4

*AP does not release post-NCAA tournament rankings

== Awards and honors ==
=== Draymond Green ===
- Big Ten Sixth Man of the Year
- All Big Ten Third Team

=== Kalin Lucas ===
- All Big Ten First Team
- NABC All District First Team
- USBWA All-District Team

=== Raymar Morgan ===
- All Big Ten Third Team (Coaches)
- All Big Ten Honorable Mention (Media)

=== Durrell Summers ===
- Most Outstanding Player, NCAA Tournament, Midwest Region
