= 2009–10 Northwestern Wildcats men's basketball team =

American college basketball season

2009–10 Northwestern Wildcats men's basketball

NIT, First Round
- Conference: Big Ten Conference
- Record: 20–14 (7–11 Big Ten)
- Head coach: Bill Carmody
- Assistant coaches: Mitch Henderson; Tavaras Hardy; Ivan Vujic
- Home arena: Welsh-Ryan Arena

2009–10 Big Ten Conference men's basketball standings
	Conf.				Overall
Team	W		L	PCT	W		L	PCT
No. 5 Ohio State†	14	–	4	.778	29	–	8	.784
No. 10 Purdue	14	–	4	.778	29	–	6	.829
No. 13 Michigan State	14	–	4	.778	28	–	9	.757
No. 16 Wisconsin	13	–	5	.722	24	–	9	.727
Illinois	10	–	8	.556	21	–	15	.583
Minnesota	9	–	9	.500	21	–	14	.600
Northwestern	7	–	11	.389	20	–	14	.588
Michigan	7	–	11	.389	15	–	17	.469
Indiana	4	–	14	.222	10	–	21	.323
Iowa	4	–	14	.222	10	–	22	.313
Penn State	3	–	15	.167	11	–	20	.355
† 2010 Big Ten tournament winner As of April 3, 2010; Rankings from AP Poll

The 2009–10 Northwestern Wildcats men's basketball team represented Northwestern University in the 2009–10 college basketball season. This was head coach Bill Carmody's tenth season at the Northwestern. The Wildcats were members of the Big Ten Conference and played their home games at Welsh-Ryan Arena. They finished the season 20–14, 7–11 in Big Ten play, lost in the quarterfinals of the 2010 Big Ten Conference men's basketball tournament and were invited to the 2010 National Invitation Tournament where they lost in the first round to the University of Rhode Island. Northwestern received its first national (AP) ranking in 41 years, when it was ranked #25 in the December 28 AP poll.

== Roster ==
No.	Name	Position	Ht.	Wt.	Year	Hometown/High School
3	Capocci, Mike	F	6–6	200	JR	Lombard, Illinois/Glenbard East
44	Coble, Kevin	F	6–8	210	SR*	Phoenix, Arizona/Scottsdale Christian Academy
1	Crawford, Drew	G/F	6–5	185	FR	Naperville, Illinois/Naperville Central
30	Curletti, Davide	F	6–9	232	SO	Farmington Hills, Michigan/Orchard Lake St. Mary's
15	Fruendt, Nick	G	6–5	195	SO	Batavia, Illinois/Batavia
11	Hearn, Reggie	G	6–4	195	FR	Fort Wayne, Indiana/Snider
4	Marcotullio, Alex	G	6–3	180	FR	Warren, Michigan/De La Salle
12	Mirković, Luka	F/C	6–11	235	SO	Belgrade, Serbia/La Lumiere (LaPorte, Ind.)
23	Nash, Jeremy	G	6–4	191	SR	Chicago, Illinois/Marist
21	Peljusic, Ivan	F	6–8	215	JR	Zadar, Croatia/V. Nazor Gymnasium
54	Rowley, Kyle	C	7–0	280	SO	Arima, Trinidad/Lake Forest (Ill.) Academy
5	Ryan, Jeff	G/F	6–7	205	SR*	Glenview, Illinois/Glenbrook South
24	Shurna, John	F	6–8	210	SO	Glen Ellyn, Illinois/Glenbard West
33	Steger, Matt	G/F	6–5	195	SR	Northfield, Illinois/Loyola Academy
22	Thompson, Michael	G	5–10	182	JR	Chicago, Illinois/Lincoln Park

"*"=indicates player used redshirt season.

== Schedule and results ==
- All times are Central

Date time, TV	Rank^{#}	Opponent^{#}	Result	Record	Site city, state
Regular Season
Nov 13, 2009*; 7:00pm, BigTenNetwork.com		Northern Illinois	W 77–55	1–0	Welsh-Ryan Arena; Evanston, IL
Nov 18, 2009*; 7:00pm, BTN		No. 11 Butler	W 67–54	1–1	Welsh-Ryan Arena; Evanston, IL
Nov 22, 2009*; 1:00pm, BigTenNetwork.com		Tennessee State	L 69–92	2–1	Welsh-Ryan Arena; Evanston, IL
Nov 24, 2009*; 5:30pm, BigTenNetwork.com		Liberty	W 69–53	3–1	Welsh-Ryan Arena; Evanston, IL
Nov 27, 2009*; 7:30pm, BTN		vs. No. 23 Notre Dame; Chicago Challenge Invitational	W 72–58	4–1	UIC Pavilion; Chicago, IL
Nov 28, 2009*; 7:00pm, BTN		vs. Iowa State; Chicago Challenge Invitational	W 67–65	5–1	UIC Pavilion; Chicago, IL
Dec 1, 2009*; 6:00pm, ESPNU		at North Carolina State; ACC-Big Ten Challenge	W 65–53	6–1	RBC Center; Raleigh, NC
Dec 13, 2009*; 4:00pm, BigTenNetwork.com		North Carolina A&T	W 90–65	7–1	Welsh-Ryan Arena; Evanston, IL
Dec 16, 2009*; 8:00pm, ESPNU		North Florida	W 84–54	8–1	Welsh-Ryan Arena; Evanston, IL
Dec 19, 2009*; 1:30pm, BTN		Stanford	W 70–62	9–1	Welsh-Ryan Arena; Evanston, IL
Dec 22, 2009*; 7:00pm, BigTenNetwork.com		Central Connecticut St	W 74–54	10–1	Welsh-Ryan Arena; Evanston, IL
Dec 30, 2009; 8:00pm, BTN	No. 25	at Illinois	L 83–89 ^{OT}	10–2 (0–1)	Assembly Hall; Champaign, IL
Jan 2, 2010; 5:30pm, BTN	No. 25	No. 11 Michigan St	L 70–91	10–3 (0–2)	Welsh-Ryan Arena; Evanston, IL
Jan 7, 2010*; 6:00pm, BigTenNetwork.com		Texas-Pan American	W 53–44	11–3	Welsh-Ryan Arena; Evanston, IL
Jan 10, 2010; 1:00pm, BTN		at Michigan	W 68–62	12–3 (1–2)	Crisler Arena; Ann Arbor, MI
Jan 13, 2010; 7:30pm, BTN		No. 13 Wisconsin	L 60–50	12–4 (1–3)	Welsh-Ryan Arena; Evanston, IL
Jan 16, 2010; 4:30pm, BTN		No. 6 Purdue	W 72–64	13–4 (2–3)	Welsh-Ryan Arena; Evanston, IL
Jan 19, 2010; 6:00pm, BTN		at No. 21 Ohio State	L 76–56	13–5 (2–4)	Schottenstein Center; Columbus, OH
Jan 23, 2010; 7:00pm, BTN		Illinois	W 73–68	14–5 (3–4)	Welsh-Ryan Arena; Evanston, IL
Jan 26, 2010; 8:00pm, BTN		at Minnesota	L 65–61	14–6 (3–5)	Williams Arena; Minneapolis, MN
Jan 30, 2010; 6:30pm, BTN		at No. 5 Michigan St	L 79–70	14–7 (3–6)	Breslin Center; East Lansing, MI
Feb 2, 2010; 6:30pm, BTN		Michigan	W 67–52	15–7 (4–6)	Welsh-Ryan Arena; Evanston, IL
Feb 7, 2010; 1:30pm, BTN		Indiana	W 78–61	16–7 (5–6)	Welsh-Ryan Arena; Evanston, IL
Feb 10, 2010; 7:35pm, BTN		at Iowa	L 78–65	16–8 (5–7)	Carver-Hawkeye Arena; Iowa City, IA
Feb 14, 2010; 4:00pm, BTN		Minnesota	W 77–74 ^{OT}	17–8 (6–7)	Welsh-Ryan Arena; Evanston, IL
Feb 17, 2010; 7:30pm, BTN		Penn State	L 81–70	17–9 (6–8)	Welsh-Ryan Arena; Evanston, IL
Feb 21, 2010; 1:00pm, BTN		at No. 14 Wisconsin	L 70–63	17–10 (6–9)	Kohl Center; Madison, WI
Feb 25, 2010; 6:00pm, ESPN2		Iowa	W 74–57	18–10 (7–9)	Welsh-Ryan Arena; Evanston, IL
Feb 28, 2010; 11:00am, BTN		at Penn State	L 79–60	18–11 (7–10)	Bryce Jordan Center; University Park, PA
Mar 3, 2010*; 7:00pm		Chicago State	W 72–49	19–11	Welsh-Ryan Arena; Evanston, IL
Mar 6, 2010; 11:00am, BTN		at Indiana	L 88–80 ^{OT}	19–12 (7–11)	Assembly Hall; Bloomington, IN
2010 Big Ten Conference men's basketball tournament
March 11, 2010; 3:55pm, ESPN2		vs. Indiana; First Round	W 73–58	20–12	Conseco Fieldhouse; Indianapolis, IN
March 12, 2010; 6:30pm, BTN		vs. No. 6 Purdue; Quarterfinals	L 69–61	20–13	Conseco Fieldhouse; Indianapolis, IN
2010 National Invitation Tournament
March 17, 2010; 6:00pm, ESPNU		at Rhode Island; First Round	L 76–64	20–14	Ryan Center; Kingston, RI
*Non-conference game. ^{#}Rankings from AP Poll. (#) Tournament seedings in parentheses.
