= 2009–10 Wisconsin Badgers men's basketball team =

American college basketball season

2009–10 Wisconsin Badgers men's basketball

NCAA tournament, Round of 32
- Conference: Big Ten Conference

Ranking
- Coaches: No. 24
- AP: No. 16
- Record: 24–9 (13–5 Big Ten)
- Head coach: Bo Ryan (9th Season)
- Associate head coach: Greg Gard
- Assistant coaches: Gary Close; Howard Moore
- Home arena: Kohl Center

2009–10 Big Ten Conference men's basketball standings
	Conf.				Overall
Team	W		L	PCT	W		L	PCT
No. 5 Ohio State†	14	–	4	.778	29	–	8	.784
No. 10 Purdue	14	–	4	.778	29	–	6	.829
No. 13 Michigan State	14	–	4	.778	28	–	9	.757
No. 16 Wisconsin	13	–	5	.722	24	–	9	.727
Illinois	10	–	8	.556	21	–	15	.583
Minnesota	9	–	9	.500	21	–	14	.600
Northwestern	7	–	11	.389	20	–	14	.588
Michigan	7	–	11	.389	15	–	17	.469
Indiana	4	–	14	.222	10	–	21	.323
Iowa	4	–	14	.222	10	–	22	.313
Penn State	3	–	15	.167	11	–	20	.355
† 2010 Big Ten tournament winner As of April 3, 2010; Rankings from AP Poll

The 2009–10 Wisconsin Badgers men's basketball team represented University of Wisconsin–Madison. The head coach was Bo Ryan, in his ninth season with the Badgers. The team played its home games at the Kohl Center in Madison, Wisconsin, and is a member of the Big Ten Conference. They finished the season 24–9, 13–5 in Big Ten play and lost in the quarterfinals of the 2010 Big Ten Conference men's basketball tournament. They received an at–large bid the 2010 NCAA Division I men's basketball tournament, earning a 4 seed in the East Region. They defeated 13 seed Wofford in the first round before being upset by 12 seed Cornell in the second round.

== Roster ==
No.	Name	Position	Ht.	Wt.	Year	Hometown/high school
40	Jared Berggren	F/C	6–10	240	RS FR	Princeton, Minnesota / Princeton HS
12	Jason Bohannon	G	6–2	195	SR	Marion, Iowa / Linn-Mar HS
31	Mike Bruesewitz	F	6–6	220	FR	St. Paul, Minnesota / Henry Sibley HS
5	Ryan Evans	G/F	6–6	210	RS FR	Phoenix, Arizona / Hamilton HS
10	Dan Fahey	G	6–3	185	FR	Chicago, Illinois / St. Ignatius Prep
44	J.P. Gavinski	C	6–11	250	RS JR	Wisconsin Dells, Wisconsin / Wisconsin Dells HS
3	Trevon Hughes	G	6–0	195	SR	Queens, New York / St. John's NW Academy
24	Tim Jarmusz	F/G	6–6	208	JR	Oshkosh, Wisconsin / West HS
30	Jon Leuer	F	6–10	230	JR	Orono, Minnesota / Orono HS
50	Ian Markolf	C	7–0	255	SO	San Antonio, Texas / Churchill HS
52	Keaton Nankivil	F	6–8	245	JR	Madison, Wisconsin / Memorial HS
2	Wquinton Smith	G	5–11	205	JR	Milwaukee, Wisconsin / Rufus King HS
11	Jordan Taylor	G	6–1	195	SO	Bloomington, Minnesota / Benilde-St. Margaret's
15	Brett Valentyn	G	6–4	192	RS JR	Verona, Wisconsin / Verona HS
33	Rob Wilson	G/F	6–3	200	SO	Cleveland, Ohio / Garfield HS
22	J.D. Wise	G	6–2	175	FR	Whitefish Bay, Wisconsin / Dominican HS

=== Depth chart ===
Pos.	Starting 5	Bench 1	Bench 2
C	Keaton Nankivil	Jared Berggren	J.P. Gavinski
PF	Jon Leuer	Mike Bruesewitz	Ian Markolf
SF	Jason Bohannon	Ryan Evans	Brett Valentyn
SG	Jordan Taylor	Tim Jarmusz	J.D. Wise, Dan Fahey
PG	Trevon Hughes	Rob Wilson	Wquinton Smith

== Schedule and results ==
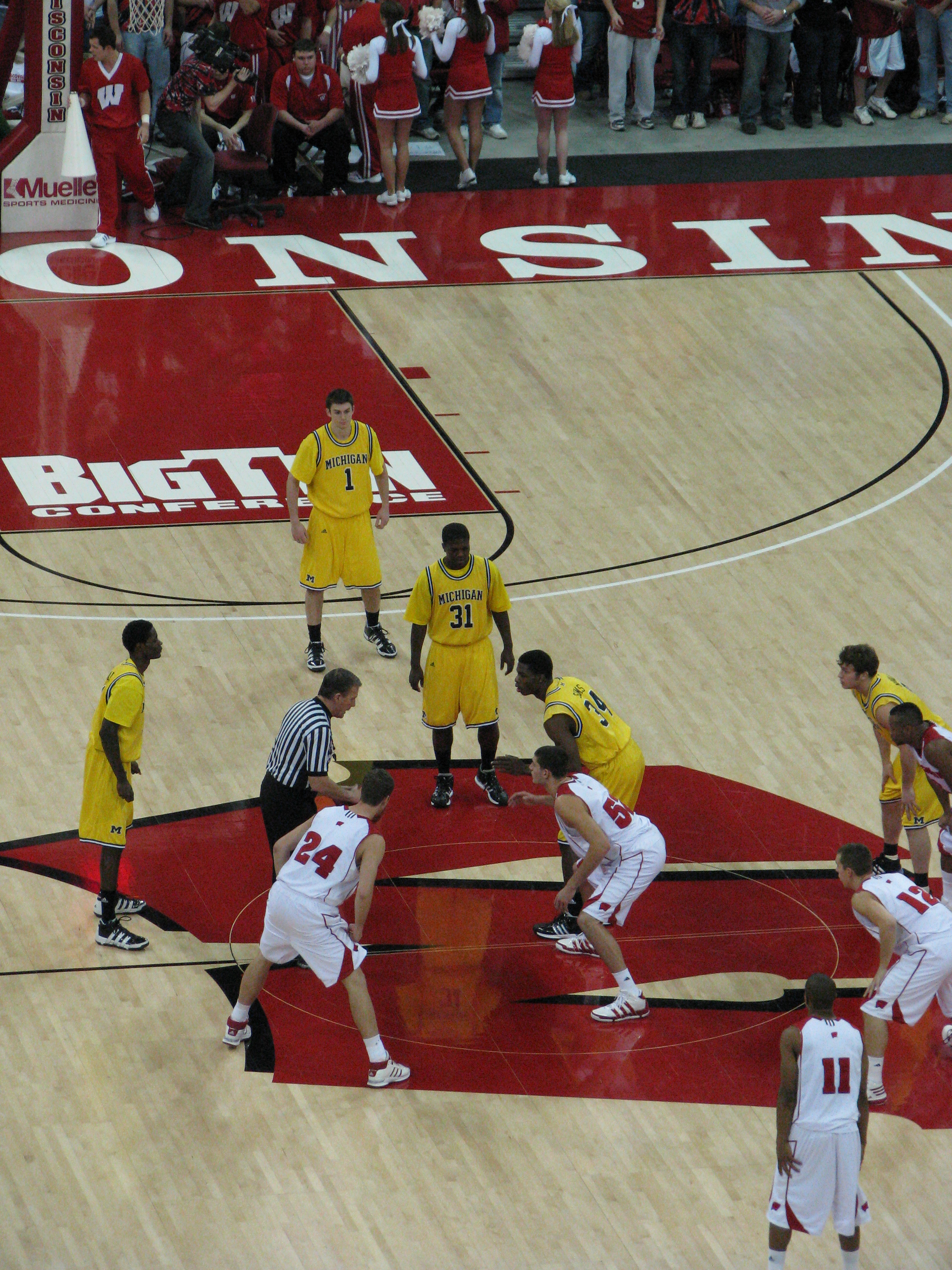
DeShawn Sims of Michigan and Keaton Nankivil prepare for the opening tipoff. (2010-01-20)

- All times are Central

Date time, TV	Rank^{#}	Opponent^{#}	Result	Record	High points	High rebounds	High assists	Site (attendance) city, state
Exhibition
11/4/2009*; 7:00pm		Bemidji State	W 90–54		NA – NA	NA – NA	NA – NA	Kohl Center (NA); Madison, WI
11/11/2009*; 7:00pm		UW–Superior	W 80–47		NA – NA	NA – NA	NA – NA	Kohl Center (NA); Madison, WI
Regular Season
11/15/2009*; 5:00pm, BTN		IPFW	W 75–46	1–0	19 – Leuer (1)	7 – Jarmusz (1)	3 – Bohannon (1), Taylor (1)	Kohl Center (17,230); Madison, WI
11/18/2009*; 7:00pm		Oakland	W 58–42	2–0	15 – Hughes (1)	9 – Nankivil (1)	4 – Hughes (1)	Kohl Center (17,230); Madison, WI
11/23/2009*; 11:00pm, ESPN2		vs. Arizona; Maui Invitational	W 65–61	3–0	24 – Hughes (2)	8 – Nankivil (2)	3 – Hughes (2)	Lahaina Civic Center (2,400); Maui, HI
11/24/2009*; 8:30pm, ESPN		vs. Gonzaga; Maui Invitational	L 61–74	3–1	19 – Taylor (1)	8 – Bohannon (1)	4 – Leuer (1)	Lahaina Civic Center (2,400); Maui, HI
11/25/2009*; 8:30pm, ESPN2		vs. No. 21 Maryland; Maui Invitational	W 78–69	4–1	20 – Bohannon (1)	7 – Leuer (1), Nankivil (3)	5 – Taylor (2)	Lahaina Civic Center (2,400); Maui, HI
12/2/2009*; 8:15pm, ESPN		No. 6 Duke; ACC – Big Ten Challenge	W 73–69	5–1	26 – Hughes (3)	8 – Evans (1)	5 – Nankivil (1)	Kohl Center (17,230); Madison, WI
12/5/2009*; 12:00pm		Grambling State	W 79–46	6–1	20 – Hughes (4)	7 – Taylor (1), Hughes (1)	5 – Taylor (3)	Kohl Center (17,230); Madison, WI
12/9/2009*; 7:00pm	No. 20	at UW–Green Bay	L 84–88 ^{OT}	6–2	27 – Hughes (5)	10 – Leuer (2)	5 – Hughes (3)	Resch Center (9,759); Green Bay, WI
12/12/2009*; 4:00pm, ESPN2	No. 20	Marquette	W 72–63	7–2	24 – Leuer (2)	12 – Leuer (3)	3 – Taylor (4)	Kohl Center (17,230); Madison, WI
12/16/2009*; 8:00pm, BTN		Cal Poly	W 90–42	8–2	20 – Hughes (6)	8 – Leuer (4)	7 – Taylor (5)	Kohl Center (17,230); Madison, WI
12/23/2009*; 8:00pm, BTN		UW–Milwaukee	W 68–58	9–2	25 – Leuer (3)	6 – Taylor (2), Leuer (5)	4 – Hughes (4)	Kohl Center (17,230); Madison, WI
12/27/2009*; 2:30pm, BTN		UI–Chicago	W 79–43	10–2	17 – Leuer (4)	8 – Wilson (1)	5 – Leuer (2)	Kohl Center (17,230); Madison, WI
12/31/2009; 1:00pm, ESPN2	No. 23	No. 15 Ohio State	W 65–43	11–2 (1–0)	16 – Hughes (7)	7 – Hughes (2)	5 – Leuer (3)	Kohl Center (17,230); Madison, WI
1/3/2010; 1:00pm, BTN	No. 23	at Penn State	W 63–46	12–2 (2–0)	18 – Hughes (8)	11 – Nankivil (4)	7 – Hughes (5)	Bryce Jordan Center (8,114); University Park, PA
1/6/2010; 5:30pm, BTN	No. 17	at No. 10 Michigan State	L 47–54	12–3 (2–1)	21 – Leuer (5)	7 – Leuer (6)	3 – Bohannon (2)	Breslin Student Events Center (14,759); East Lansing, MI
1/9/2010; 12:30pm, BTN	No. 17	No. 4 Purdue	W 73–66	13–3 (3–1)	23 – Taylor (2)	10 – Leuer (7)	2 – Jarmusz (1), Leuer (4), Taylor (6)	Kohl Center (17,230); Madison, WI
1/13/2010; 7:30pm, BTN	No. 13	at Northwestern	W 60–50	14–3 (4–1)	19 – Bohannon (2)	7 – Hughes (3)	7 – Taylor (7)	Evanston, IL (6,566); Welsh-Ryan Arena
1/16/2010; 7:00pm, BTN	No. 13	at Ohio State	L 51–60	14–4 (4–2)	18 – Hughes (9)	6 – Jarmusz (2), Nankivil (5)	3 – Taylor (8)	Columbus, OH (18,402); Jerome Schottenstein Center
1/20/2010; 7:30pm, BTN	No. 18	Michigan	W 54–48	15–4 (5–2)	20 – Hughes (10)	8 – Nankivil (6)	2 – Nankivil (2), Bohannon (3), Hughes (6), Taylor (9)	Kohl Center (17,230); Madison, WI
1/24/2010; 1:30pm, BTN	No. 18	Penn State	W 79–71 ^{OT}	16–4 (6–2)	22 – Hughes (11)	7 – Nankivil (7)	6 – Taylor (10)	Kohl Center (17,230); Madison, WI
1/28/2010; 6:00pm, ESPN	No. 16	at No. 10 Purdue	L 57–60	16–5 (6–3)	25 – Nankivil (1)	6 – Nankivil (8)	5 – Taylor (11)	Mackey Arena (14,123); West Lafayette, IN
2/2/2010; 8:00pm, ESPN	No. 16	No. 5 Michigan State	W 67–49	17–5 (7–3)	19 – Bohannon (3)	5 – Nankivil (9)	7 – Hughes (7)	Kohl Center (17,230); Madison, WI
2/6/2010; 3:00pm, CBS	No. 16	at Michigan	W 62–44	18–5 (8–3)	18 – Bohannon (4)	6 – Taylor (3)	5 – Bohannon (4)	Crisler Arena (13,501); Ann Arbor, MI
2/9/2010; 6:00pm, BTN	No. 11	Illinois	L 56–63	18–6 (8–4)	15 – Bohannon (5)	6 – Bohannon (2), Nankivil (10)	3 – Bohannon (5), Taylor (12)	Kohl Center (17,230); Madison, WI
2/13/2010; 1:00pm, BTN	No. 11	Indiana	W 83–55	19–6 (9–4)	30 – Bohannon (6)	7 – Bruesewitz (1)	3 – Nankivil (3), Bohannon (6), Taylor (13)	Kohl Center (17,230); Madison, WI
2/18/2010; 8:00pm, ESPN	No. 14	at Minnesota	L 68–52	19–7 (9–5)	19 – Hughes (12)	6 – Nankivil (11)	6 – Taylor (14)	Williams Arena (14,625); Minneapolis, MN
2/21/2010; 1:00pm, BTN	No. 14	Northwestern	W 70–63	20–7 (10–5)	17 – Bohannon (7)	5 – Hughes (4)	4 – Taylor (15)	Kohl Center (17,230); Madison, WI
2/25/2010; 8:00pm, BTN	No. 17	at Indiana	W 78–46	21–7 (11–5)	17 – Hughes (13)	7 – Leuer (8)	4 – Taylor (16)	Assembly Hall (16,502); Bloomington, IN
3/3/2010; 7:30pm, BTN	No. 15	Iowa	W 67–40	22–7 (12–5)	18 – Leuer (6)	9 – Bohannon (3)	4 – Leuer (5), Hughes (8), Taylor (17)	Kohl Center (17,230); Madison, WI
3/7/2010; 1:00pm, ESPN	No. 15	at Illinois	W 72–57	23–7 (13–5)	20 – Taylor (3), Leuer (7)	11 – Hughes (5)	3 – Taylor (18)	Assembly Hall (16,618); Champaign, IL
2010 Big Ten Conference men's basketball tournament
3/12/2010; 1:25pm, ESPN	No. 13	vs. Illinois; Quarterfinals	L 58–54	23–8	14 – Leuer (8), Hughes (14)	8 – Nankivil (12)	3 – Taylor (19)	Conseco Fieldhouse (16,207); Indianapolis, IN
2010 NCAA Division I men's basketball tournament
3/19/2010*; 1:50pm, CBS	No. 16 (4)	vs. (13) Wofford; First Round	W 53–49	24–8	20 – Leuer (9)	8 – Leuer (9)	1 – Leuer (6), Hughes (9), Bohannon (7)	Jacksonville Veterans Memorial Arena (10,657); Jacksonville, FL
3/21/2010*; 1:50pm, CBS	No. 16 (4)	vs. (12) Cornell; Second Round	L 87–69	24–9	23 – Leuer (10)	4 – Leurer (10)	6 – Taylor (20)	Jacksonville Veterans Memorial Arena (12,547); Jacksonville, FL
*Non-conference game. ^{#}Rankings from AP Poll. (#) Tournament seedings in parentheses.

== Rankings ==
Ranking movement Legend: ██ Improvement in ranking. ██ Decrease in ranking. ██ Not ranked the previous week. RV=Others receiving votes.
Poll	Pre	Wk 1	Wk 2	Wk 3	Wk 4	Wk 5	Wk 6	Wk 7	Wk 8	Wk 9	Wk 10	Wk 11	Wk 12	Wk 13	Wk 14	Wk 15	Wk 16	WK 17	Wk 18	Final
AP	--	--	--	RV	20	RV	RV	23	17	13	18	16	16	11	14	17	15	13	16	24
Coaches	--	--	--	RV	23	RV	RV	RV	20	16	19	16	16	13	16	19	17	18	19	24

== 2010 signing class ==
College recruiting information
Name	Hometown	School	Height	Weight	Commit date
Evan Anderson; C	Eau Claire, WI	North High School	6 ft 11 in (2.11 m)	240 lb (110 kg)	May 4, 2008
Evan Anderson; C	Recruit ratings: Scout: Rivals: (93)				
Josh Gasser; PG	Port Washington, WI	Port Washington High School	6 ft 4 in (1.93 m)	190 lb (86 kg)	Sep 24, 2009
Josh Gasser; PG	Recruit ratings: Scout: Rivals: (89)				
Duje Dukan; SF	Deerfield, IL	Deerfield High School	6 ft 8 in (2.03 m)	190 lb (86 kg)	Nov 10, 2009
Duje Dukan; SF	Recruit ratings: Scout: Rivals: (89)				
Ben Brust; SG	Mundelein, IL	Mundelein Cons. High School	6 ft 2 in (1.88 m)	180 lb (82 kg)	May 7, 2010
Ben Brust; SG	Recruit ratings: Scout: Rivals: (90)				
Overall recruit ranking: Rivals: N/A
Note: In many cases, Scout, Rivals, 247Sports, On3, and ESPN may conflict in their listings of height and weight.; In these cases, the average was taken. ESPN grades are on a 100-point scale.; Sources: "2010 Team Ranking". Rivals.
