= 2009–10 Iowa Hawkeyes men's basketball team =

American college basketball season

2009–10 Iowa Hawkeyes men's basketball
- Conference: Big Ten Conference
- Record: 10–22 (4–14 Big Ten)
- Head coach: Todd Lickliter (3rd season)
- Assistant coaches: Joel Cornette; LaVall Jordan; Chad Walthall
- Home arena: Carver-Hawkeye Arena; Capacity: 15,500

2009–10 Big Ten Conference men's basketball standings
	Conf.				Overall
Team	W		L	PCT	W		L	PCT
No. 5 Ohio State†	14	–	4	.778	29	–	8	.784
No. 10 Purdue	14	–	4	.778	29	–	6	.829
No. 13 Michigan State	14	–	4	.778	28	–	9	.757
No. 16 Wisconsin	13	–	5	.722	24	–	9	.727
Illinois	10	–	8	.556	21	–	15	.583
Minnesota	9	–	9	.500	21	–	14	.600
Northwestern	7	–	11	.389	20	–	14	.588
Michigan	7	–	11	.389	15	–	17	.469
Indiana	4	–	14	.222	10	–	21	.323
Iowa	4	–	14	.222	10	–	22	.313
Penn State	3	–	15	.167	11	–	20	.355
† 2010 Big Ten tournament winner As of April 3, 2010; Rankings from AP Poll

The 2009–10 Iowa Hawkeyes men's basketball team represented the University of Iowa in the 2009-10 college basketball season. The team was led by head coach Todd Lickliter and team played their home games at Carver-Hawkeye Arena, which has been their home since 1983. They were members of the Big Ten Conference. They finished the season 10–22, 4–14 in Big Ten play and lost in the first round of the 2010 Big Ten Conference men's basketball tournament.

At the end of the season, Lickliter was fired on March 15, 2010. He had gone 38-57 overall and 15-39 in Big Ten Conference games, the worst three-year stretch in program history.

== 2009-10 Schedule and Results ==
- All times are Central

Date time, TV	Rank^{#}	Opponent^{#}	Result	Record	Site (attendance) city, state
Exhibition
11/8/2009*; 12:35pm		Marian	W 76–53	-	Carver-Hawkeye Arena (8,660); Iowa City, IA
Regular Season
11/15/2009*; 5:05pm, ESPNU		UT–San Antonio; O'Reilly Auto Parts CBE Classic	L 62–50	0–1	Carver-Hawkeye Arena (8,486); Iowa City, IA
11/17/2009*; 8:05pm, ESPNU		Duquesne; O'Reilly Auto Parts CBE Classic	L 52–50	0–2	Carver-Hawkeye Arena (7,943); Iowa City, IA
11/20/2009*; 8:05pm		Bowling Green	W 68–46	1–2	Carver-Hawkeye Arena (9,010); Iowa City, IA
11/23/2009*; 8:45pm, ESPN2		vs. No. 3 Texas; O'Reilly Auto Parts CBE Classic	L 85–60	1–3	Sprint Center (7,226); Kansas City, MO
11/24/2009*; 6:45pm, ESPNU		vs. Wichita State; O'Reilly Auto Parts CBE Classic	L 74–57	1–4	Sprint Center (8,076); Kansas City, MO
11/28/2009*; 12:35pm, BTN		NC Central	W 73–63	2–4	Carver-Hawkeye Arena (8,433); Iowa City, IA
12/1/2009*; 8:30pm, ESPN2		Virginia Tech; ACC – Big Ten Challenge	L 70–64	2–5	Carver-Hawkeye Arena (8,755); Iowa City, IA
12/5/2009*; 3:05pm		Prairie View A&M	W 80–51	3–5	Carver-Hawkeye Arena (8,375); Iowa City, IA
12/8/2009*; 7:05pm, KWWL		at Northern Iowa; Iowa Big Four	L 67–50	3–6	McLeod Center (6,480); Cedar Falls, IA
12/11/2009*; 7:05pm, Cyclone Television Network		at Iowa State; Hy-Vee Cy-Hawk Series	L 81–71	3–7	Hilton Coliseum (13,203); Ames, IA
12/19/2009*; 5:35pm, BTN		Drake; Iowa Big Four	W 71–67	4–7	Carver-Hawkeye Arena (9,921); Iowa City, IA
12/21/2009*; 7:35pm, BTN		South Carolina State	W 82–69	5–7	Carver-Hawkeye Arena (8,561); Iowa City, IA
12/29/2009; 6:05pm, BTN		No. 4 Purdue	L 67–56	5–8 (0–1)	Carver-Hawkeye Arena (12,468); Iowa City, IA
1/2/2010; 3:05pm, BTN		Minnesota	L 86–74	5–9 (0–2)	Carver-Hawkeye Arena (9,588); Iowa City, IA
1/5/2010; 8:05pm, BTN		at Illinois	L 59–42	5–10 (0–3)	Assembly Hall (14,806); Champaign, IL
1/9/2010; 4:35pm, BTN		Michigan State	L 71–53	5–11 (0–4)	Carver-Hawkeye Arena (9,924); Iowa City, IA
1/12/2010*; 8:05pm		Tennessee State	W 67–62	6–11 (0–4)	Carver-Hawkeye Arena (8,021); Iowa City, IA
1/16/2010; 12:05pm, BTN		Penn State	W 67–64	7–11 (1–4)	Carver-Hawkeye Arena (9,651); Iowa City, IA
1/20/2010; 5:35pm, BTN		at No. 6 Michigan State	L 70–63	7–12 (1–5)	Breslin Center (14,759); East Lansing, MI
1/24/2010; 5:05pm, BTN		at Indiana	W 58–43	8–12 (2–5)	Assembly Hall (16,078); Bloomington, IN
1/27/2010; 7:35pm, BTN		No. 20 Ohio State	L 65–57	8–13 (2–6)	Carver-Hawkeye Arena (12,132); Iowa City, IA
1/30/2010; 3:35pm, BTN		at Michigan	L 60–46	8–14 (2–7)	Crisler Arena (13,541); Ann Arbor, MI
2/3/2010; 7:35pm, BTN		Illinois	L 57–49	8–15 (2–8)	Carver-Hawkeye Arena (11,441); Iowa City, IA
2/7/2010; 11:05am, BTN		at No. 13 Ohio State	L 68–58	8–16 (2–9)	Jerome Schottenstein Center (15,223); Columbus, OH
2/10/2010; 7:35pm, BTN		Northwestern	W 78-65	9–16 (3–9)	Carver-Hawkeye Arena (8,697); Iowa City, IA
2/13/2010; 3:35pm, BTN		at No. 6 Purdue	L 63–40	9–17 (3–10)	Mackey Arena (14,123); West Lafayette, IN
2/16/2010; 8:05pm, BTN		Michigan	L 80–78 ^{OT}	9–18 (3–11)	Carver-Hawkeye Arena (9,485); Iowa City, IA
2/25/2010; 6:00pm, ESPN2		at Northwestern	L 74–57	9–19 (3–12)	Welsh-Ryan Arena (5,265); Evanston, IL
2/28/2010; 5:05pm, BTN		Indiana	W 73–57	10–19 (4–12)	Carver-Hawkeye Arena (11,011); Iowa City, IA
3/3/2010; 7:30pm, BTN		at No. 15 Wisconsin	L 67–40	10–20 (4–13)	Kohl Center (17,230); Madison, WI
3/7/2010; 5:05pm, BTN		at Minnesota	L 88–53	10–21 (4–14)	Williams Arena (14,625); Minneapolis, MN
Big Ten tournament
3/11/2010; 1:30pm, ESPN2		vs. Michigan; First Round	L 59–52	10–22	Conseco Fieldhouse (N/A); Indianapolis, IN
*Non-conference game. ^{#}Rankings from AP Poll. (#) Tournament seedings in parentheses.
