= 2010 Big Ten men's basketball tournament =

- Classification: Division I
- Season: 2009–10
- Teams: 11
- Site: Conseco Fieldhouse; Indianapolis, Indiana
- Champions: Ohio State (2nd title)
- Winning coach: Thad Matta (2nd title)
- MVP: Evan Turner (Ohio State)
- Television: BTN, ESPN, ESPN2, and CBS

2009–10 Big Ten Conference men's basketball standings
	Conf.				Overall
Team	W		L	PCT	W		L	PCT
No. 5 Ohio State†	14	–	4	.778	29	–	8	.784
No. 10 Purdue	14	–	4	.778	29	–	6	.829
No. 13 Michigan State	14	–	4	.778	28	–	9	.757
No. 16 Wisconsin	13	–	5	.722	24	–	9	.727
Illinois	10	–	8	.556	21	–	15	.583
Minnesota	9	–	9	.500	21	–	14	.600
Northwestern	7	–	11	.389	20	–	14	.588
Michigan	7	–	11	.389	15	–	17	.469
Indiana	4	–	14	.222	10	–	21	.323
Iowa	4	–	14	.222	10	–	22	.313
Penn State	3	–	15	.167	11	–	20	.355
† 2010 Big Ten tournament winner As of April 3, 2010; Rankings from AP Poll

The 2010 Big Ten men's basketball tournament was played between March 11 through March 14 at Conseco Fieldhouse in Indianapolis, Indiana. It was the thirteenth annual Big Ten men's basketball tournament. The championship was won by Ohio State who defeated Minnesota in the championship game. As a result, Ohio State received the Big Ten's automatic bid to the NCAA tournament. The win marked Ohio State's second tournament championship (one prior championship has been vacated).

== Seeds ==
All Big Ten schools played in the tournament. Teams were seeded by conference record, with a tiebreaker system used to seed teams with identical conference records. Seeding for the tournament was determined at the close of the regular conference season. The top five teams received a first-round bye.

Seed	School	Conference	Tiebreaker
1	Ohio State	14–4	2–1 vs Pur, MSU
2	Purdue	14–4	2–2 vs OSU, MSU
3	Michigan State	14–4	1–2 vs OSU, Pur
4	Wisconsin	13–5	
5	Illinois	10–8	
6	Minnesota	9–9	
7	Northwestern	7–11	2–0 vs Mich
8	Michigan	7–11	0–2 vs NW
9	Iowa	4–14	2–0 vs Ind
10	Indiana	4–14	0–2 vs Iowa
11	Penn State	3–15	

== Schedule ==
Session	Game	Time*	Matchup^{#}	Television	Score
Opening round – Thursday, March 11
1	1	2:30 PM	#8 Michigan vs #9 Iowa	ESPN2	59–52
1	2	5:00 PM	#7 Northwestern vs #10 Indiana	ESPN2	73–58
1	3	8:30 PM	#6 Minnesota vs #11 Penn State	BTN	76–55
Quarterfinals – Friday, March 12
2	4	12:00 PM	#1 Ohio State vs #8 Michigan	ESPN	69–68
2	5	2:30 PM	#4 Wisconsin vs #5 Illinois	ESPN	54–58
3	6	6:30 PM	#2 Purdue vs #7 Northwestern	BTN	69–61
7		9:00 PM	#3 Michigan State vs #6 Minnesota	BTN	67–72 (OT)
Semifinals – Saturday, March 13
4	8	1:40 PM	#1 Ohio State vs. #5 Illinois	CBS	88–81 (2OT)
4	9	4:05 PM	#2 Purdue vs. #6 Minnesota	CBS	42–69
Championship Game – Sunday, March 14
5	10	3:30 PM	#1 Ohio State vs. #6 Minnesota	CBS	90–61
*Game times in ET. #-Rankings denote tournament seeding.

== Bracket ==
Opening round Thursday, March 11
8	Michigan	59
9	Iowa	52
7	Northwestern	73
10	Indiana	58
6	Minnesota	76
11	Penn State	55

Quarterfinals; Friday, March 12
1	#5 Ohio State	69
8	Michigan	68
4	#13 Wisconsin	54
5	Illinois	58
2	#6 Purdue	69
7	Northwestern	61
3	#11 Michigan State	67
6	Minnesota	72^{OT}

Semifinals; Saturday, March 13
1	#5 Ohio State	88^{2OT}
5	Illinois	81
2	#6 Purdue	42
6	Minnesota	69

Championship; Sunday, March 14
1	#5 Ohio State	90
6	Minnesota	61

== Honors ==
=== All-Tournament Team ===
- Evan Turner, Ohio State – Big Ten tournament Most Outstanding Player
- Demetri McCamey, Illinois
- William Buford, Ohio State
- David Lighty, Ohio State
- Devoe Joseph, Minnesota
