= 2009–10 Minnesota Golden Gophers men's basketball team =

American college basketball season

2009–10 Minnesota Golden Gophers men's basketball

NCAA Tournament, First Round
- Conference: Big Ten Conference
- Record: 21–14 (9–9 Big Ten)
- Head coach: Tubby Smith (3rd season)
- Assistant coaches: Ron Jirsa (3rd season); Saul Smith (3rd season); Vince Taylor (3rd season)
- Home arena: Williams Arena

2009–10 Big Ten Conference men's basketball standings
	Conf.				Overall
Team	W		L	PCT	W		L	PCT
No. 5 Ohio State†	14	–	4	.778	29	–	8	.784
No. 10 Purdue	14	–	4	.778	29	–	6	.829
No. 13 Michigan State	14	–	4	.778	28	–	9	.757
No. 16 Wisconsin	13	–	5	.722	24	–	9	.727
Illinois	10	–	8	.556	21	–	15	.583
Minnesota	9	–	9	.500	21	–	14	.600
Northwestern	7	–	11	.389	20	–	14	.588
Michigan	7	–	11	.389	15	–	17	.469
Indiana	4	–	14	.222	10	–	21	.323
Iowa	4	–	14	.222	10	–	22	.313
Penn State	3	–	15	.167	11	–	20	.355
† 2010 Big Ten tournament winner As of April 3, 2010; Rankings from AP Poll

The 2009–10 Minnesota Golden Gophers men's basketball team represented the University of Minnesota in the college basketball season of 2009–2010. The team's head coach was Tubby Smith in his third year. The Golden Gophers played their home games at Williams Arena in Minneapolis and are members of the Big Ten Conference. They finished the season 21–14, 9–9 in Big Ten play. They advanced to the championship game of the 2010 Big Ten Conference men's basketball tournament before losing to Ohio State. They received an at-large bid to the 2010 NCAA Division I men's basketball tournament, earning an 11 seed in the West Region. They lost to six-seed and AP #25 Xavier in the first round.

== Season ==
Royce White signed with the Minnesota Golden Gophers, but did not play due to shoplifting and trespassing charges. He transferred to Iowa State in July 2010.

== Roster ==
#	Name	Height	Weight (lbs.)	Position	Class	Hometown	Previous team(s)
0	Al Nolen	6'1"	180	G	Jr.	Minneapolis	Minneapolis Camden HS
1	Paul Carter	6'8"	205	F	Jr.	Little Rock, Arkansas	Little Rock Mills HS; Missouri State-West Plains
3	Justin Cobbs	6'3"	190	G	Fr.	Los Angeles	Bishop Montgomery HS
5	Devoe Joseph	6'3"	170	G	So.	Ajax, Ontario, Canada	Pickering HS
20	Lawrence Westbrook	6'0"	195	G	Sr.	Chandler, Arizona	Winchendon Prep
22	Devron Bostick	6'5"	210	G	Sr.	Racine, Wisconsin	St. Catharine's HS; SW Illinois
24	Blake Hoffarber	6'4"	200	G	Jr.	Minnetonka, Minnesota	Hopkins HS
32	Trevor Mbakwe	6'8"	240	F	RJr.	Saint Paul, Minnesota	St. Bernard's HS; Miami Dade College
33	Rodney Williams	6'7"	210	F	Fr.	Minneapolis	Robbinsdale Cooper HS
34	Damian Johnson	6'7"	210	F	RSr.	Thibodaux, Louisiana	Thibodaux HS
45	Colton Iverson	6'10"	235	F/C	So.	Yankton, South Dakota	Yankton HS
50	Ralph Sampson III	6'11"	230	F/C	So.	Duluth, Georgia	Northview HS

== 2009–10 Schedule and results ==
Date time, TV	Rank^{#}	Opponent^{#}	Result	Record	Site city, state
Exhibition
November 5, 2009*; 7:00 pm		Minnesota Duluth	W 114–47		Williams Arena; Minneapolis
November 9, 2009*; 7:00 pm		Minnesota State Moorhead	W 98–49		Williams Arena; Minneapolis
Non-conference regular season
November 13, 2009*; 7:00 pm	No. 25	Tennessee Tech	W 87–50	1–0	Williams Arena (12,513); Minneapolis
November 16, 2009*; 7:00 pm	No. 24	Stephen F. Austin	W 82–42	2–0	Williams Arena; Minneapolis
November 19, 2009*; 7:00 pm, BTN	No. 24	Utah Valley	W 76–51	3–0	Williams Arena; Minneapolis
November 26, 2009*; 7:30 pm, ESPN2	No. 22	vs. No. 12 Butler; 2009 76 Classic	W 82–73	4–0	Anaheim Convention Center; Anaheim, California
November 27, 2009*; 8:30 pm, ESPNU	No. 22	vs. Portland; 2009 76 Classic	L 56–61	4–1	Anaheim Convention Center; Anaheim, California
November 29, 2009*; 4:00 pm, ESPN2	No. 22	vs. Texas A&M; 2009 76 Classic	L 65–66	4–2	Anaheim Convention Center; Anaheim, California
December 2, 2009*; 6:15 pm, ESPNU		at Miami; ACC–Big Ten Challenge	L 58–63	4–3	BankUnited Center; Coral Gables, Florida
December 5, 2009*; 2:30 pm		Brown	W 91–55	5–3	Williams Arena; Minneapolis
December 8, 2009*; 6:00 pm, ESPNU		Morgan State	W 94–64	6–3	Williams Arena; Minneapolis
December 12, 2009*; 3:00 pm, BTN		St. Joseph's	W 97–74	7–3	Williams Arena; Minneapolis
December 15, 2009*; 7:00 pm, BTN		Northern Illinois	W 89–48	8–3	Williams Arena; Minneapolis
December 23, 2009*; 6:00 pm, BTN		South Dakota State	W 92–62	9–3	Williams Arena; Minneapolis
Big Ten regular season
December 29, 2009; 8:00 pm, ESPN2		Penn State	W 75–70	10–3 (1–0)	Williams Arena; Minneapolis
January 2, 2010; 3:00 pm, BTN		at Iowa	W 86–74	11–3 (2–0)	Carver–Hawkeye Arena; Iowa City, Iowa
January 5, 2010; 6:00 pm, ESPN		at No. 4 Purdue	L 60–79	11–4 (2–1)	Mackey Arena; West Lafayette, Indiana
January 9, 2010; 2:30 pm, BTN		Ohio State	W 73–62	12–4 (3–1)	Williams Arena; Minneapolis
January 13, 2010; 5:30 pm, BTN		at No. 7 Michigan State	L 53–60	12–5 (3–2)	Breslin Center; East Lansing, Michigan
January 17, 2010; 3:30 pm, BTN		at Indiana	L 78–81 ^{OT}	12–6 (3–3)	Assembly Hall; Bloomington, Indiana
January 23, 2010; 11:00 am, CBS		No. 6 Michigan State	L 64–65	12–7 (3–4)	Williams Arena; Minneapolis
January 26, 2010; 8:00 pm, BTN		Northwestern	W 65–61	13–7 (4–4)	Williams Arena; Minneapolis
January 31, 2010; 12:00 pm, CBS		at No. 20 Ohio State	L 63–85	13–8 (4–5)	Jerome Schottenstein Center; Columbus, Ohio
February 6, 2010; 1:00 pm, BTN		at Penn State	W 66–64	14–8 (5–5)	Bryce Jordan Center; University Park, Pennsylvania
February 11, 2010; 6:00 pm, ESPN		Michigan	L 63–71	14–9 (5–6)	Williams Arena; Minneapolis, MN
February 14, 2010; 4:00, BTN		at Northwestern	L 74–77 ^{OT}	14–10 (5–7)	Welsh-Ryan Arena; Evanston, Illinois
February 18, 2010; 8:00 pm, ESPN/ESPN2		No. 14 Wisconsin	W 68–52	15–10 (6–7)	Williams Arena; Minneapolis
February 20, 2010; 7:00 pm, BTN		Indiana	W 81–58	16–10 (7–7)	Williams Arena; Minneapolis
February 24, 2010; 7:30 pm, BTN		No. 3 Purdue	L 58–59	16–11 (7–8)	Williams Arena; Minneapolis
February 27, 2010; 3:00 pm, BTN		at Illinois	W 62–60	17–11 (8–8)	Assembly Hall; Champaign, Illinois
March 2, 2010; 6:00 pm, BTN		at Michigan	L 55–83	17–12 (8–9)	Crisler Arena; Ann Arbor, Michigan
March 7, 2010; 5:00 pm, BTN		Iowa	W 88–53	18–12 (9–9)	Williams Arena; Minneapolis
2010 Big Ten tournament
March 11, 2010; 6:30 pm, BTN	(6)	vs. (11) Penn State; First round	W 76–55	19–12	Conseco Fieldhouse; Indianapolis
March 12, 2010; 8:00 pm, BTN	(6)	vs. (3) No. 11 Michigan State; Quarterfinals	W 72–67 ^{OT}	20–12	Conseco Fieldhouse; Indianapolis
March 13, 2010; 3:10 pm, CBS	(6)	vs. (2) No. 6 Purdue; Semifinals	W 69–42	21–12	Conseco Fieldhouse; Indianapolis
March 14, 2010; 2:30 pm, CBS	(6)	vs. (1) No. 5 Ohio State; Championship Game	L 61–90	21–13	Conseco Fieldhouse; Indianapolis
2010 NCAA Men's Basketball tournament
March 19, 2010; 11:30 am, CBS	(11 W)	vs. (6 W) No. 25 Xavier; First round	L 54–65	21–14	Bradley Center; Milwaukee
*Non-conference game. ^{#}Rankings from AP Poll. (#) Tournament seedings in parentheses. All times are in Central Time.

== Rankings ==
Ranking movements Legend: ██ Increase in ranking ██ Decrease in ranking — = Not ranked RV = Received votes
	Week																				
Poll	Pre	1	2	3	4	5	6	7	8	9	10	11	12	13	14	15	16	17	18	19	Final
AP	25	24	22	RV	RV	RV	—														Not released
Coaches	18	18	16	RV	—			RV	RV	RV	—										

*AP does not release post-NCAA Tournament rankings
^Coaches did not release a Week 1 poll.
