= 2009–10 Ohio State Buckeyes men's basketball team =

American college basketball season

2009–10 Ohio State Buckeyes men's basketball

Big Ten Regular Season Co-Champions Big Ten tournament Champions

NCAA tournament, Sweet Sixteen
- Conference: Big Ten

Ranking
- Coaches: No. 11
- AP: No. 5
- Record: 29–8 (14–4 Big Ten)
- Head coach: Thad Matta
- Assistant coaches: Jeff Boals; Alan Major; Brandon Miller
- Home arena: Value City Arena

2009–10 Big Ten Conference men's basketball standings
| | Conf. | | | | Overall |
| Team | W | | L | PCT | W | | L | PCT |
|---|---|---|---|---|---|---|---|---|
| No. 5 Ohio State† | 14 | – | 4 | .778 | 29 | – | 8 | .784 |
| No. 10 Purdue | 14 | – | 4 | .778 | 29 | – | 6 | .829 |
| No. 13 Michigan State | 14 | – | 4 | .778 | 28 | – | 9 | .757 |
| No. 16 Wisconsin | 13 | – | 5 | .722 | 24 | – | 9 | .727 |
| Illinois | 10 | – | 8 | .556 | 21 | – | 15 | .583 |
| Minnesota | 9 | – | 9 | .500 | 21 | – | 14 | .600 |
| Northwestern | 7 | – | 11 | .389 | 20 | – | 14 | .588 |
| Michigan | 7 | – | 11 | .389 | 15 | – | 17 | .469 |
| Indiana | 4 | – | 14 | .222 | 10 | – | 21 | .323 |
| Iowa | 4 | – | 14 | .222 | 10 | – | 22 | .313 |
| Penn State | 3 | – | 15 | .167 | 11 | – | 20 | .355 |
† 2010 Big Ten tournament winner As of April 3, 2010; Rankings from AP Poll

The 2009–10 Ohio State Buckeyes men's basketball team represented Ohio State University in the 2009–10 college basketball season. Their head coach was Thad Matta, in his 6th season with the Buckeyes. The team played its home games at Value City Arena in Columbus, Ohio, and is a member of the Big Ten Conference.

On March 14, 2010, the Ohio State Buckeyes won the Big Ten tournament for the first time since 2007, defeating the Minnesota Golden Gophers 90–61. The Buckeyes now have three Big Ten tournament Championships (2002, 2007, 2010), the most of any team in the Big Ten. The Buckeyes also made the 2010 NCAA Division I men's basketball tournament, making it for the second consecutive year and four out of the six years Thad Matta has been head coach. They were a 2 seed in the Midwest Region. Ohio State ended the 2009–10 season with a loss to 6 seed and AP #15 Tennessee Volunteers in the Sweet Sixteen. Their final record was 29–8.

== Roster ==
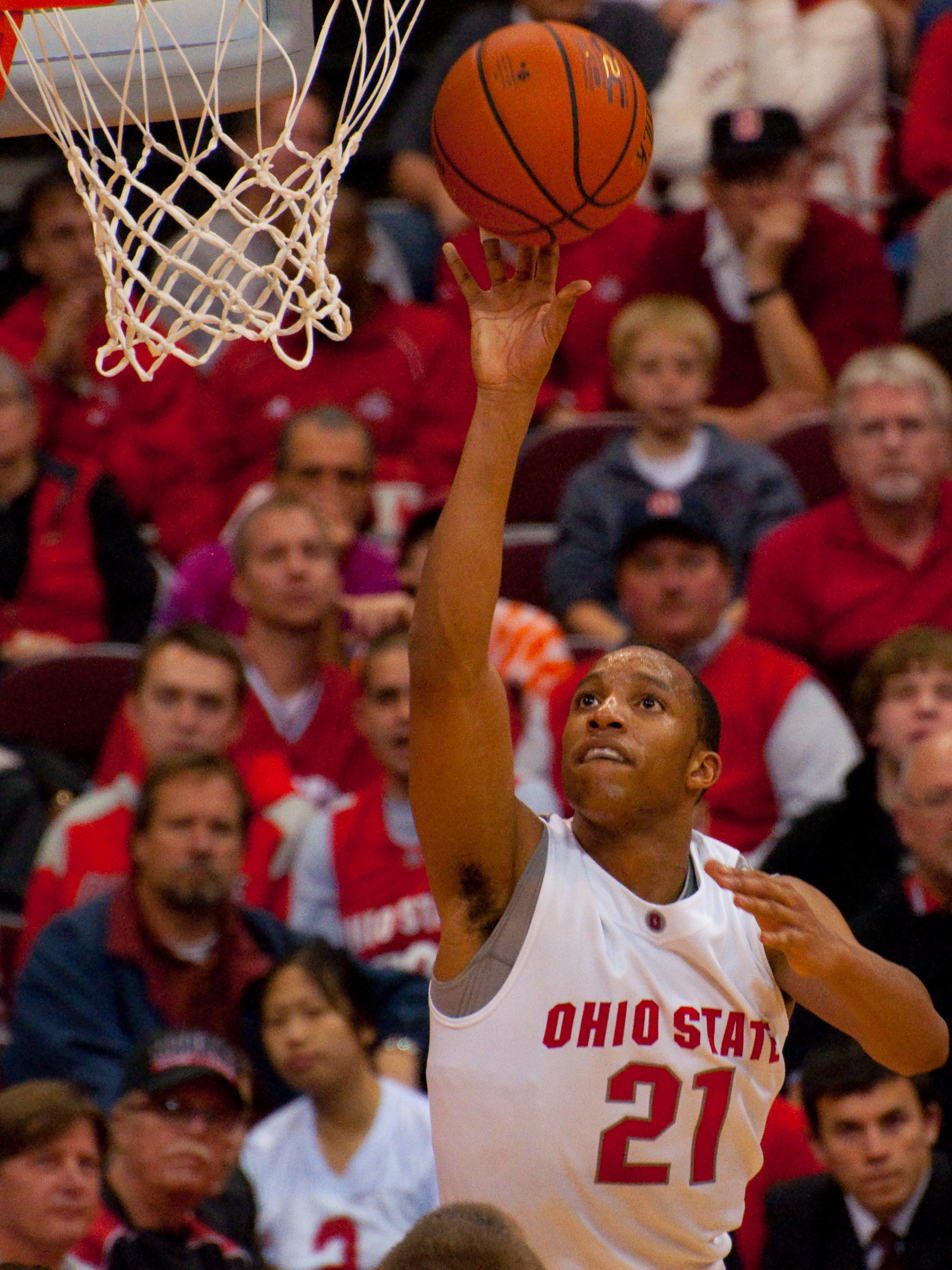
Evan Turner set new Big Ten records for number of career and single season Player of the Week awards during the 2009–10 Big Ten Conference men's basketball season.

| No. | Name | Ht. | Wt. | Position | Yr. | Hometown |
|---|---|---|---|---|---|---|
| 2 | Simmons, Jeremie | 6' 3" | 190 | Guard | Senior | Indianapolis, IN |
| 4 | Hill, P.J. | 6' 1" | 165 | Guard | Senior | Minneapolis, MN |
| 10 | Days, Eddie | 6' 0" | 180 | Guard | Junior | Richmond Heights, OH |
| 12 | Reynolds, Dustin | 6' 6" | 215 | Forward | Junior | Portage, OH |
| 13 | Peters, Danny | 6' 2" | 180 | Guard | Senior | New Albany, OH |
| 15 | Madsen, Kyle | 6' 9" | 240 | Center | Senior | Dublin, OH |
| 21 | Turner, Evan | 6' 7" | 205 | Guard/Forward | Junior | Chicago, IL |
| 23 | Lighty, David | 6' 5" | 220 | Guard/Forward | Junior | Cleveland, OH |
| 24 | Kecman, Nikola | 6' 8" | 220 | Forward | Sophomore | Belgrade, Serbia |
| 33 | Diebler, Jon | 6' 6" | 205 | Guard | Junior | Upper Sandusky, OH |
| 34 | Titus, Mark | 6' 4" | 210 | Guard | Senior | Brownsburg, IN |
| 44 | Buford, William | 6' 5" | 190 | Guard | Sophomore | Toledo, OH |
| 45 | Sarikopoulos, Zisis | 7' 0" | 265 | Center | Sophomore | Athens, Greece |
| 52 | Lauderdale, Dallas | 6' 8" | 255 | Forward | Junior | Solon, OH |

== 2010 Recruiting Class ==
College recruiting information
| Name | Hometown | School | Height | Weight | Commit date |
|---|---|---|---|---|---|
| Aaron Craft; PG | Findlay, Ohio | Liberty Benton | 6 ft 0 in (1.83 m) | 172 lb (78 kg) | Jun 7, 2009 |
| Aaron Craft; PG | Recruit ratings: Scout: Rivals: (92) | | | | |
| Jordan Sibert; SG | Cincinnati, Ohio | Princeton | 6 ft 4 in (1.93 m) | 180 lb (82 kg) | Sep 20, 2008 |
| Jordan Sibert; SG | Recruit ratings: Scout: Rivals: (93) | | | | |
| Lenzelle Smith; SF | Zion, Illinois | Zion Benton | 6 ft 3 in (1.91 m) | 200 lb (91 kg) | Sep 22, 2008 |
| Lenzelle Smith; SF | Recruit ratings: Scout: Rivals: (94) | | | | |
| Jared Sullinger; C | Columbus, Ohio | Northland | 6 ft 8 in (2.03 m) | 260 lb (120 kg) | May 10, 2007 |
| Jared Sullinger; C | Recruit ratings: Scout: Rivals: (98) | | | | |
| Deshaun Thomas; PF | Fort Wayne, Indiana | Bishop Luers | 6 ft 6 in (1.98 m) | 208 lb (94 kg) | Jun 1, 2007 |
| Deshaun Thomas; PF | Recruit ratings: Scout: Rivals: (96) | | | | |
| J.D. Weatherspoon; PF | Columbus, Ohio | Northland | 6 ft 6 in (1.98 m) | 200 lb (91 kg) | Aug 11, 2009 |
| J.D. Weatherspoon; PF | Recruit ratings: Scout: Rivals: (91) | | | | |
Overall recruit ranking:
Note: In many cases, Scout, Rivals, 247Sports, On3, and ESPN may conflict in their listings of height and weight.; In these cases, the average was taken. ESPN grades are on a 100-point scale.; Sources: "2010 Team Ranking". Rivals.

== 2009–10 Schedule ==
| Date time, TV | Rank^{#} | Opponent^{#} | Result | Record | Site (attendance) city, state |
Regular Season
| November 9*; 7:00 p.m., BTN | No. 16 | Alcorn State; 2K Sports Classic Coaches vs. Cancer | W 100–60 | 1–0 | Value City Arena (11,015); Columbus, OH |
| November 12*; 7:00 p.m., BTN | No. 16 | James Madison; 2K Sports Classic Coaches vs. Cancer | W 72–44 | 2–0 | Value City Arena (11,356); Columbus, OH |
| November 19*; 9:30 p.m., ESPN2 | No. 15 | vs. No. 6 North Carolina; 2K Sports Classic Coaches vs. Cancer | L 73–77 | 2–1 | Madison Square Garden (15,635); New York, NY |
| November 20*; 5:00 p.m., ESPN2 | No. 15 | vs. No. 13 California; 2K Sports Classic Coaches vs. Cancer | W 76–70 | 3–1 | Madison Square Garden (15,552); New York, NY |
| November 24*; 7:00 p.m., BTN | No. 17 | Lipscomb | W 84–64 | 4–1 | Value City Arena (11,555); Columbus, OH |
| November 28*; 5:30 p.m., BTN | No. 17 | St. Francis (PA) | W 110–47 | 5–1 | Value City Arena (12,063); Columbus, OH |
| December 2*; 9:30 p.m., ESPN2 | No. 15 | No. 21 Florida State; ACC – Big Ten Challenge | W 77–64 | 6–1 | Value City Arena (13,514); Columbus, OH |
| December 5*; 12:00 p.m., ESPNU | No. 15 | Eastern Michigan | W 111–60 | 7–1 | Value City Arena (12,135); Columbus, OH |
| December 12*; 12:00 p.m., ESPN | No. 13 | at No. 22 Butler | L 66–74 | 7–2 | Hinkle Fieldhouse (9,338); Indianapolis, IN |
| December 16*; 7:00 p.m., BTN | No. 18 | Presbyterian | W 78–48 | 8–2 | Value City Arena (11,984); Columbus, OH |
| December 19*; 4:00 p.m., ESPNU | No. 18 | Delaware State | W 60–44 | 9–2 | Value City Arena (12,159); Columbus, OH |
| December 22*; 8:30 p.m., BTN | No. 17 | Cleveland State | W 72–59 | 10–2 | Value City Arena (13,462); Columbus, OH |
| December 31; 2:00 p.m., ESPN2 | No. 15 | at No. 23 Wisconsin | L 43–65 | 10–3 (0–1) | Kohl Center (17,230); Madison, WI |
| January 3; 4:30 p.m., BTN | No. 15 | at Michigan | L 64–73 | 10–4 (0–2) | Crisler Arena (13,751); Ann Arbor, MI |
| January 6; 8:30 p.m., BTN | | Indiana | W 79–54 | 11–4 (1–2) | Value City Arena (13,712); Columbus, OH |
| January 9; 3:30 p.m., BTN | | at Minnesota | L 62-73 | 11–5 (1–3) | Williams Arena (14,625); Minneapolis, MN |
| January 12; 7:00 p.m., ESPN | | at No. 6 Purdue | W 70–66 | 12–5 (2–3) | Mackey Arena (14,123); West Lafayette, IN |
| January 16; 8:00 p.m., BTN | | No. 13 Wisconsin | W 60–51 | 13–5 (3–3) | Value City Arena (18,402); Columbus, OH |
| January 19; 7:00 p.m., BTN | No. 21 | Northwestern | W 76–56 | 14–5 (4–3) | Value City Arena (13,324); Columbus, OH |
| January 23*; 2:00 p.m., CBS | No. 21 | at No. 11 West Virginia | L 65-71 | 14–6 (4–3) | WVU Coliseum (15,033); Morgantown, WV |
| January 27; 8:30 p.m., BTN | No. 20 | at Iowa | W 65–57 | 15–6 (5–3) | Carver-Hawkeye Arena (12,132); Iowa City, IA |
| January 31; 1:00 p.m., CBS | No. 20 | Minnesota | W 85–63 | 16–6 (6–3) | Value City Arena (17,125); Columbus, OH |
| February 3; 6:30 p.m., BTN | No. 13 | Penn State | W 75–62 | 17–6 (7–3) | Value City Arena (14,148); Columbus, OH |
| February 7; 12:00 p.m., BTN | No. 13 | Iowa | W 68–58 | 18–6 (8–3) | Value City Arena (15,223); Columbus, OH |
| February 10; 6:30 p.m., BTN | No. 13 | at Indiana | W 69–52 | 19–6 (9–3) | Assembly Hall (16,442); Bloomington, IN |
| February 14; 1:00 p.m., CBS | No. 13 | at Illinois | W 72–53 | 20–6 (10–3) | Assembly Hall (16,618); Champaign, IL |
| February 17; 6:30 p.m., BTN | No. 9 | No. 4 Purdue | L 57-60 | 20–7 (10–4) | Value City Arena (19,049); Columbus, OH |
| February 21; 12:00 p.m., CBS | No. 9 | at No. 11 Michigan State | W 74–67 | 21–7 (11–4) | Breslin Center (14,759); East Lansing, MI |
| February 24; 6:30 p.m., BTN | No. 9 | at Penn State | W 75–67 | 22–7 (12–4) | Bryce Jordan Center (8,721); University Park, PA |
| February 27; 12:00 p.m., ESPN | No. 9 | Michigan | W 66–55 | 23–7 (13–4) | Value City Arena (18,862); Columbus, OH |
| March 2; 9:00 p.m., ESPN | No. 5 | Illinois | W 73–57 | 24–7 (14–4) | Value City Arena (16,177); Columbus, OH |
Big Ten tournament
| March 12; 12:00 p.m., ESPN | (1) No. 5 | vs. (8) Michigan; Quarterfinals | W 69–68 | 25–7 | Conseco Fieldhouse (16,207); Indianapolis, IN |
| March 13; 1:40 p.m., CBS | (1) No. 5 | vs. (5) Illinois; Semifinals | W 88–81 ^{2OT} | 26–7 | Conseco Fieldhouse (18,424); Indianapolis, IN |
| March 14; 3:30 p.m., CBS | (1) No. 5 | vs. (6) Minnesota; Championship Game | W 90–61 | 27–7 | Conseco Fieldhouse (14,598); Indianapolis, IN |
NCAA tournament
| March 19; 10:06 p.m., CBS | (2 MW) No. 5 | vs. (15 MW) UC Santa Barbara; First Round | W 68–51 | 28–7 | Bradley Center (17,580); Milwaukee, WI |
| March 21; 2:20 p.m., CBS | (2 MW) No. 5 | vs. (10 MW) Georgia Tech; Second Round | W 75–66 | 29–7 | Bradley Center (18,031); Milwaukee, WI |
| March 26; 7:07 p.m., CBS | (2 MW) No. 5 | vs. (6 MW) No. 15 Tennessee; Sweet Sixteen | L 73–76 | 29–8 | Edward Jones Dome (N/A); St. Louis, MO |
*Non-conference game. ^{#}Rankings from AP Poll Rank indicates seed in the NCAA tournament. E-East region, W-West region, S-South region, M-Midewest Region. (#) Tournament seedings in parentheses.

== Game Notes – NCAA Tournament ==
=== First Round: UC Santa Barbara ===
| Teams | 1st | 2nd | Final |
| (15) UCSB | 17 | 34 | 51 |
| (2) OHST | 30 | 38 | 68 |

The Buckeyes began the 2010 NCAA Tournament with a first round win over UC Santa Barbara in Milwaukee, Wisconsin. The game went back and forth in the early minutes of the first half with Ohio State taking control late. UCSB later came back never being put away by Ohio State, coming within 10 points halfway through the second half. However, Ohio State kept their lead and pulled out a 68–51 win despite Player of the Year nominee Evan Turner only making 2/13 field goals.

=== Second Round: Georgia Tech ===
| Teams | 1st | 2nd | Final |
| (10) GA TECH | 26 | 40 | 66 |
| (2) OHST | 28 | 47 | 75 |

After a commanding win over UCSB in the first round, the Ohio State Buckeyes took on the Georgia Tech Yellow Jackets in the second round for a trip to St. Louis and the sweet sixteen. After Georgia Tech started off the game on a 10–2 run, the Buckeyes came back and made a game of it. At the half Ohio State led 28–26 over the Yellow Jackets. The Buckeyes came out shooting after halftime with their biggest lead coming a 14 points. However, Georgia Tech came back in the final three minutes and cut it to a four-point game. With a couple made free-throws and great defensive plays, the Buckeyes punched their ticket to the Sweet Sixteen against Tennessee in St. Louis.

=== Sweet Sixteen: Tennessee ===
| Teams | 1st | 2nd | Final |
| (6) TENN | 39 | 37 | 76 |
| (2) OHST | 42 | 31 | 73 |

The Ohio State Buckeyes made their way to the Sweet Sixteen for the first time since 2007 with a matchup against the Tennessee Volunteers. Ohio State jumped out to an early lead in the game with the score going back and forth throughout the first half. By halftime, the Buckeyes had a 42–39 lead, and kept it in the early parts of the second half. However, towards the end of the second half, Tennessee jumped out to a five-point lead which was eventually tied. Turner and the Buckeyes could not get a game winning shot at the end and lost to Tennessee 76–73.

== Rankings ==
Ranking movement Legend: ██ Increase in ranking. ██ Decrease in ranking. ██ Not ranked the previous week.
| Poll | Pre | Wk 1 | Wk 2 | Wk 3 | Wk 4 | Wk 5 | Wk 6 | Wk 7 | Wk 8 | Wk 9 | Wk 10 | Wk 11 | Wk 12 | Wk 13 | Wk 14 | Wk 15 | Wk 16 | Wk 17 | Wk 18 | Final |
|---|---|---|---|---|---|---|---|---|---|---|---|---|---|---|---|---|---|---|---|---|
| AP | 16 | 15 | 17 | 15 | 13 | 18 | 17 | 15 | NR | NR | 21 | 20 | 13 | 13 | 9 | 9 | 6 | 5 | 5 | |
| Coaches | 17 | 15 | 18 | 15 | 15 | 18 | 17 | 15 | NR | NR | 25 | 24 | 18 | 16 | 12 | 9 | 7 | 7 | 6 | 11 |

== See also ==
- 2010 NCAA Division I men's basketball tournament
- 2009-10 NCAA Division I men's basketball season
- List of NCAA Division I institutions
- 2009–10 Ohio State Buckeyes women's basketball team
