= 2009–10 Indiana Hoosiers men's basketball team =

American college basketball season

2009–10 Indiana Hoosiers men's basketball
- Conference: Big Ten Conference
- Record: 10–21 (4–14 Big Ten)
- Head coach: Tom Crean (2nd Season)
- Assistant coaches: Tim Buckley; Bennie Seltzer; Roshown McLeod
- Home arena: Assembly Hall

2009–10 Big Ten Conference men's basketball standings
	Conf.				Overall
Team	W		L	PCT	W		L	PCT
No. 5 Ohio State†	14	–	4	.778	29	–	8	.784
No. 10 Purdue	14	–	4	.778	29	–	6	.829
No. 13 Michigan State	14	–	4	.778	28	–	9	.757
No. 16 Wisconsin	13	–	5	.722	24	–	9	.727
Illinois	10	–	8	.556	21	–	15	.583
Minnesota	9	–	9	.500	21	–	14	.600
Northwestern	7	–	11	.389	20	–	14	.588
Michigan	7	–	11	.389	15	–	17	.469
Indiana	4	–	14	.222	10	–	21	.323
Iowa	4	–	14	.222	10	–	22	.313
Penn State	3	–	15	.167	11	–	20	.355
† 2010 Big Ten tournament winner As of April 3, 2010; Rankings from AP Poll

The 2009–10 Indiana Hoosiers men's basketball team represented Indiana University in the 2009–10 college basketball season. Their head coach was Tom Crean, in his second season with the Hoosiers. The team played its home games at the Assembly Hall in Bloomington, Indiana, and was a member of the Big Ten Conference. They finished the season 10–21, 4–14 in Big Ten play.

The Hoosiers lost in the first round of the 2010 Big Ten Conference men's basketball tournament.

== 2009–10 roster ==
No.	Name	Position	Ht.	Wt.	Year	Hometown/high school
00	Kory Barnett	F	6–5	195	So.	Rochester, Indiana / Rochester High School
23	Bobby Capobianco	F	6–9	238	Fr.	Loveland, Ohio / Loveland High School
3	Maurice Creek	G	6–5	200	Fr.	Oxon Hill, Maryland / Hargrave Military Academy
33	Devan Dumes	G	6–2	192	Sr.	Indianapolis, Indiana / Eastern Michigan University
32	Derek Elston	F	6–9	220	Fr.	Tipton, Indiana / Tipton High School
4	Brett Finkelmeier	G	6–1	190	Jr.	Carmel, Indiana / Carmel High School
59	Steven Gambles	F	6–4	230	Sr.	Indianapolis, Indiana / Lambuth University
1	Jordan Hulls	G	6–0	172	Fr.	Bloomington, Indiana / Bloomington High School South
40	Tijan Jobe	C	7–0	250	Sr.	Banjul, Gambia / Olney Central College
12	Verdell Jones III	G	6–5	183	So.	Champaign, Illinois / Champaign Central High School
0	Will Stein	G	5–10	172	Fr.	Evansville, Indiana / Reitz Memorial High School
15	Bawa Muniru	C	6–11	242	Fr.	Tumu, Ghana / Mount Zion Christian Academy
25	Tom Pritchard	F	6–9	248	So.	Westlake, Ohio / St. Edward High School
5	Jeremiah Rivers	G	6–5	214	Jr.	Winter Park, Florida / Georgetown University
30	Matt Roth	G	6–3	192	So.	Washington, Illinois / Washington Community High School
2	Christian Watford	F	6–9	220	Fr.	Birmingham, Alabama / Shades Valley High School

== Recruiting class ==
College recruiting
Name	Hometown	School	Height	Weight	Commit date
Bobby Capobianco; PF	Loveland, OH	Loveland	6 ft 8 in (2.03 m)	220 lb (100 kg)	Apr 17, 2008
Bobby Capobianco; PF	Recruit ratings: Scout: Rivals: (89)				
Maurice Creek; SG	Oxon Hill, MD	Hargrave Military Academy (VA)	6 ft 5 in (1.96 m)	200 lb (91 kg)	May 4, 2008
Maurice Creek; SG	Recruit ratings: Scout: Rivals: (92)				
Derek Elston; SF	Tipton, IN	Tipton	6 ft 8 in (2.03 m)	220 lb (100 kg)	Sep 10, 2007
Derek Elston; SF	Recruit ratings: Scout: Rivals: (89)				
Jordan Hulls; PG	Bloomington, IN	Bloomington South	6 ft 0 in (1.83 m)	170 lb (77 kg)	May 20, 2008
Jordan Hulls; PG	Recruit ratings: Scout: Rivals: (92)				
Matt Roth; SG	Metamora, IL	Washington	6 ft 3 in (1.91 m)	175 lb (79 kg)	Aug 22, 2007
Matt Roth; SG	Recruit ratings: Scout: Rivals: (87)				
Bawa Muniru; C	Durham, NC	Mt. Zion	7 ft 0 in (2.13 m)	255 lb (116 kg)	Sep 26, 2008
Bawa Muniru; C	Recruit ratings: Scout: Rivals:				
Christian Watford; SF	Birmingham, AL	Shades Valley	6 ft 8 in (2.03 m)	215 lb (98 kg)	Sep 9, 2008
Christian Watford; SF	Recruit ratings: Scout: Rivals: (94)				
Overall recruit ranking: Scout: 10 Rivals: 11 ESPN: 12
Note: In many cases, Scout, Rivals, 247Sports, On3, and ESPN may conflict in their listings of height and weight.; In these cases, the average was taken. ESPN grades are on a 100-point scale.; Sources: "2009 Team Ranking". Rivals.

== Schedule and results ==
Date time, TV	Rank^{#}	Opponent^{#}	Result	Record	Site city, state
Regular season
11/13/2009*; 8:00pm		Howard	W 83–60	1–0	Assembly Hall; Bloomington, IN
11/16/2009*; 8:30pm		USC Upstate	W 69–61	2–0	Assembly Hall; Bloomington, IN
11/19/2009*; 5:00pm		vs. Ole Miss; Puerto Rico Tip-Off	L 71-89	2–1	Coliseo de Puerto Rico; San Juan
11/20/2009*; 6:00pm		Boston University; Puerto Rico Tip-Off	L 67-71	2–2	Coliseo de Puerto Rico; San Juan
11/22/2009*; 10:30am		vs. George Mason; Puerto Rico Tip-Off	L 66-69	2–3	Coliseo de Puerto Rico; San Juan
11/28/2009*; 3:30pm		Northwestern State	W 90–72	3–3	Assembly Hall; Bloomington, IN
12/1/2009*; 7:30pm		Maryland; ACC – Big Ten Challenge	L 68-80	3–4	Assembly Hall; Bloomington, IN
12/8/2009*; 9:00pm		vs. Pittsburgh; Jimmy V Classic	W 74–64	4–4	Madison Square Garden; New York, NY
12/12/2009*; 12:00pm		No. 4 Kentucky	L 73-90	4–5	Assembly Hall; Bloomington, IN
12/19/2009*; 8:30pm		North Carolina Central	W 81–58	5–5	Assembly Hall; Bloomington, IN
12/22/2009*; 6:30pm		Loyola (MD)	L 67-72	5–6	Assembly Hall; Bloomington, IN
12/28/2009*; 9:00pm		Bryant	W 90–52	6–6	Assembly Hall; Bloomington, IN
12/31/2009; 12:00pm		Michigan	W 71–65	7–6 (1–0)	Assembly Hall; Bloomington, IN
1/6/2010; 8:30pm		at Ohio State	L 54-79	7–7 (1–1)	Value City Arena; Columbus, OH
1/9/2010; 8:00pm		Illinois; Rivalry	L 60-66	7–8 (1–2)	Assembly Hall; Bloomington, IN
1/14/2010; 9:00pm		at Michigan	L 45-69	7–9 (1–3)	Crisler Arena; Ann Arbor, MI
1/17/2010; 4:30pm		Minnesota	W 81–78 ^{OT}	8–9 (2–3)	Assembly Hall; Bloomington, IN
1/21/2010; 7:00pm		at Penn State	W 67–61	9–9 (3–3)	Bryce Jordan Center; University Park, PA
1/24/2010; 6:00pm, BTN		Iowa	L 43-58	9–10 (3–4)	Assembly Hall; Bloomington, IN
1/30/2010; 2:00pm, ESPN2		at Illinois; Rivalry	L 70-72	9–11 (3–5)	Assembly Hall; Champaign, IL
2/4/2010; 7:00pm, ESPN2		No. 7 Purdue; Rivalry/Crimson and Gold Cup	L 75-78	9–12 (3–6)	Assembly Hall; Bloomington, IN
2/7/2010; 2:30pm		at Northwestern	L 61-78	9–13 (3–7)	Welsh-Ryan Arena; Evanston, IL
2/10/2010; 6:30pm		No. 16 Ohio State	L 52-69	9–14 (3–8)	Assembly Hall; Bloomington, IN
2/13/2010; 2:00pm, BTN		at No. 13 Wisconsin	L 55-83	9–15 (3–9)	Kohl Center; Madison, WI
2/16/2010; 7:00pm, ESPN		No. 11 Michigan State	L 58-72	9–16 (3–10)	Assembly Hall; Bloomington, IN
2/20/2010; 8:00pm		at Minnesota	L 58-81	9–17 (3–11)	Williams Arena; Minneapolis, MN
2/25/2010; 9:00pm, BTN		No. 19 Wisconsin	L 46-78	9–18 (3–12)	Assembly Hall; Bloomington, IN
2/28/2010; 5:00pm, BTN		at Iowa	L 57-73	9–19 (3–13)	Carver–Hawkeye Arena; Iowa City, IA
3/3/2010; 5:30pm, BTN		at No. 7 Purdue; Rivalry/Crimson and Gold Cup	L 55-74	9–20 (3–14)	Mackey Arena; West Lafayette, IN
3/6/2010; 12:00pm, BTN		Northwestern	W 88–80 ^{OT}	10–20 (4–14)	Assembly Hall; Bloomington, IN
2010 Big Ten tournament
3/11/2010; 3:55pm, ESPN2		vs. Northwestern; First Round	L 58-73	10–21	Conseco Fieldhouse; Indianapolis, IN
*Non-conference game. ^{#}Rankings from Coaches' Poll. (#) Tournament seedings in parentheses.
