= 2009–10 Illinois Fighting Illini men's basketball team =

American college basketball season

2009–10 Illinois Fighting Illini men's basketball

NIT, Quarterfinals
- Conference: Big Ten Conference
- Record: 21–15 (10–8 Big Ten)
- Head coach: Bruce Weber (7th season)
- Assistant coaches: Wayne McClain (9th season); Jay Price (7th season); Jerrance Howard (3rd season)
- MVP: Demetri McCamey
- Captains: Bill Cole; Demetri McCamey
- Home arena: Assembly Hall

2009–10 Big Ten Conference men's basketball standings
	Conf.				Overall
Team	W		L	PCT	W		L	PCT
No. 5 Ohio State†	14	–	4	.778	29	–	8	.784
No. 10 Purdue	14	–	4	.778	29	–	6	.829
No. 13 Michigan State	14	–	4	.778	28	–	9	.757
No. 16 Wisconsin	13	–	5	.722	24	–	9	.727
Illinois	10	–	8	.556	21	–	15	.583
Minnesota	9	–	9	.500	21	–	14	.600
Northwestern	7	–	11	.389	20	–	14	.588
Michigan	7	–	11	.389	15	–	17	.469
Indiana	4	–	14	.222	10	–	21	.323
Iowa	4	–	14	.222	10	–	22	.313
Penn State	3	–	15	.167	11	–	20	.355
† 2010 Big Ten tournament winner As of April 3, 2010; Rankings from AP Poll

The 2009–10 Illinois Fighting Illini men's basketball team represented University of Illinois at Urbana–Champaign in the 2009–10 NCAA Division I men's basketball season. This was head coach Bruce Weber's seventh season at the school. They are members of the Big Ten Conference and played their home games at Assembly Hall. The Illini finished the season 21–15, 10–8 in Big Ten play and lost in the semifinals of the 2010 Big Ten Conference men's basketball tournament. They were invited to the 2010 National Invitation Tournament where they advanced to the quarterfinals before falling to Dayton.

== Pre-season ==
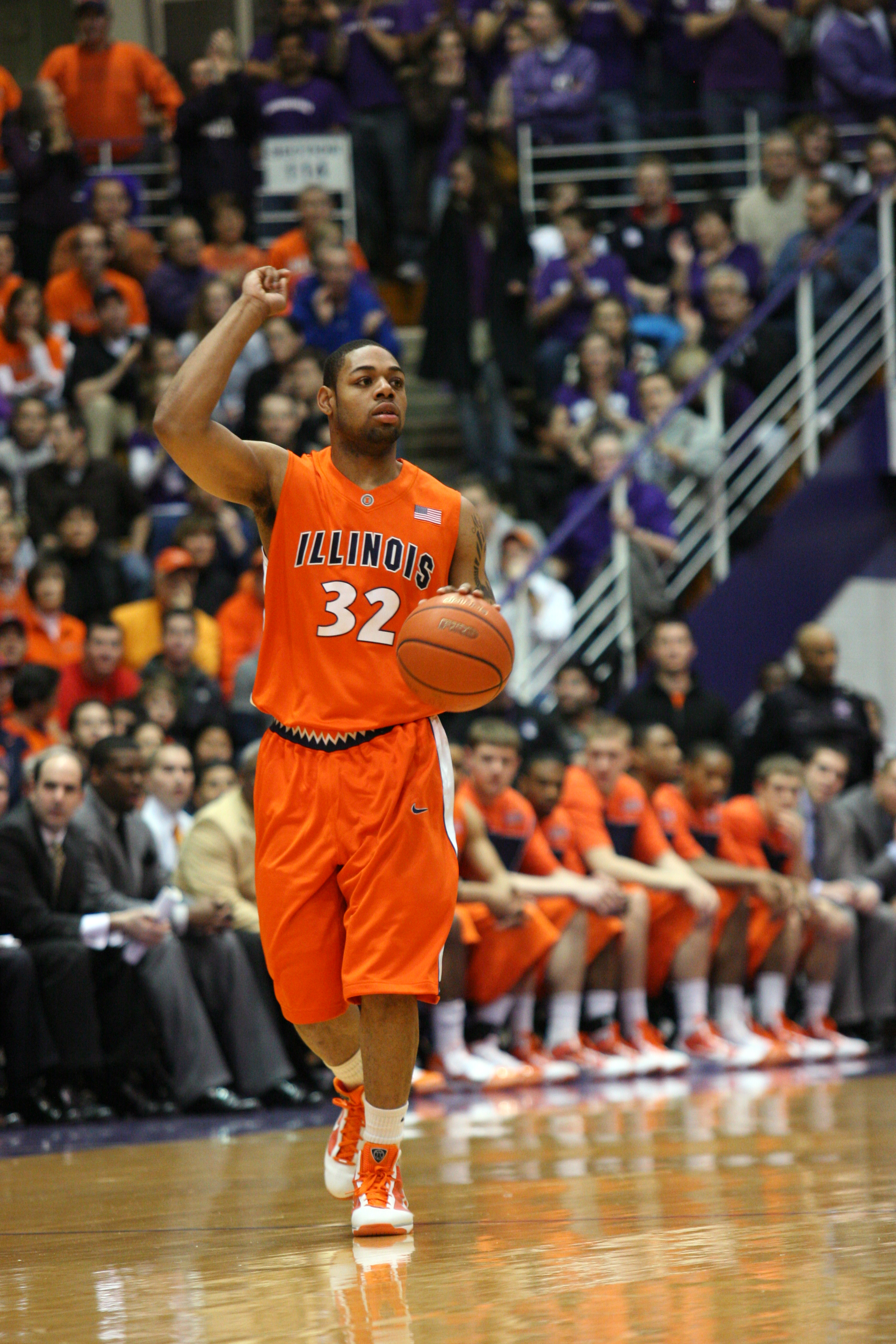
Demetri McCamey set several Illini assists records during the season

=== College GameDay ===
On Tuesday, August 18, ESPN announced that Illinois will serve as one of the host sites for the network’s popular basketball series, College GameDay, during the 2009–10 NCAA Division I men's basketball season. Two one-hour shows (10:00 a.m. and 7:00 p.m. Central) will originate from the Assembly Hall on February 6, 2010 for the Illinois vs. Michigan State game. This is Illinois’s first appearance on ESPN College GameDay. The series, which is in its sixth season, will make four first-time stops in 2010. Other first-time hosts include Clemson, Kansas State and Washington. The Illinois/Michigan State game will be the only Big Ten game featured this season.

=== Jeffrey Jordan ===
On October 6, 2009 it was reported that Jeffrey Jordan was talking to former teammates and coaches about a possible return to the Illinois basketball team. Jordan had left the team in June, after his second season, to focus on school. October 16, 2009, coach Bruce Weber said that Jordan planned to return to the team.

=== Pre-season rankings ===
Various publications and news sources released their preseason rankings prior to the start of the 2009–10 season. Illinois has been ranked by the publications below. The Fighting Illini were ranked 23rd by the Associated Press in their pre-season poll released. The Illini received the 27th most votes in the Coaches poll and failed to make their Top 25.

Associated Press	Coaches	Athlon	Lindy's	Sporting News	Fox Sports	CBS Sports	SI.com	Rivals.com
23	NR	NR	25	21	18	23	NR	24

=== Departures ===
Illinois lost a good portion of their backcourt with the departure of 2008-09 senior guards Chester Frazier, Trent Meacham, and Calvin Brock.

Name	Number	Pos.	Height	Weight	Year	Hometown	Notes
Trent Meacham	1	G	6'2"	195	RS Senior	Champaign, IL	Graduated/Pro for WBC Raiffeisen Wels (Austria)
Chester Frazier	3	G	6'2"	195	Senior	Baltimore, MD	Graduated/Hired by Illini as Graduate Assistant and Video Coordinator
Calvin Brock	25	G	6'5"	200	RS Senior	Chicago, IL	Graduated

=== 2009 additions ===
Freshmen Joseph Bertrand, Brandon Paul and D.J. Richardson help fill the holes in the guard positions, while freshmen Stan Simpson and Tyler Griffey will add depth to the frontcourt.

College recruiting information
Name	Hometown	School	Height	Weight	Commit date
Joseph Bertrand; SG	Sterling, IL	Sterling High School	6 ft 5 in (1.96 m)	185 lb (84 kg)	Oct 12, 2008
Joseph Bertrand; SG	Recruit ratings: Scout: Rivals: (88)				
Tyler Griffey; PF	Ballwin, MO	Lafayette High School	6 ft 8 in (2.03 m)	210 lb (95 kg)	Sep 6, 2008
Tyler Griffey; PF	Recruit ratings: Scout: Rivals: (91)				
Brandon Paul; SG	Gurnee, IL	Warren Township HS	6 ft 3 in (1.91 m)	180 lb (82 kg)	Oct 11, 2007
Brandon Paul; SG	Recruit ratings: Scout: Rivals: (91)				
D.J. Richardson; SG	Peoria, IL	Findlay College Prep	6 ft 3 in (1.91 m)	180 lb (82 kg)	Oct 11, 2007
D.J. Richardson; SG	Recruit ratings: Scout: Rivals: (93)				
Overall recruit ranking: Scout: 22 Rivals: 10 247Sports: 21 On3: 12
Note: In many cases, Scout, Rivals, 247Sports, On3, and ESPN may conflict in their listings of height and weight.; In these cases, the average was taken. ESPN grades are on a 100-point scale.; Sources: "Illinois Commit List for 2009". Rivals.; "Men's Basketball Recruiting". Scout.; "ESPN - Illinois Fighting Illini Basketball Recruiting 2009". ESPN.; "Scout.com Team Recruiting Rankings". Scout.; "2009 Team Ranking". Rivals.; "2009–10 Illinois Fighting Illini men's basketball team". 247Sports.; "2009–10 Illinois Fighting Illini men's basketball team". On3.

== Roster ==
2009–10 Illinois Fighting Illini men's basketball team
Players
Coaches

Pos.	#	Name	Height	Weight	Year	Previous school	Hometown
G	1	D. J. Richardson	6 ft 2 in (1.88 m)	185 lb (84 kg)	Fr	Central High School	Peoria, IL
G	2	Joseph Bertrand (injured) (redshirt)	6 ft 5 in (1.96 m)	185 lb (84 kg)	Fr	Sterling high School	Sterling, IL
G	3	Brandon Paul	6 ft 4 in (1.93 m)	195 lb (88 kg)	Fr	Warren Township High School	Gurnee, IL
G	13	Jeffrey Jordan	6 ft 1 in (1.85 m)	185 lb (84 kg)	Jr	Loyola Academy	Highland Park, IL
G	15	Bubba Chisholm	5 ft 11 in (1.8 m)	180 lb (82 kg)	Sr	Central High School	Champaign, IL
C	21	Stan Simpson	6 ft 9 in (2.06 m)	220 lb (100 kg)	RS Fr	Simeon High School	Chicago, IL
F	23	Dominique Keller	6 ft 7 in (2.01 m)	230 lb (104 kg)	Sr	Memorial High School	Port Arthur, TX
F	24	Mike Davis	6 ft 9 in (2.06 m)	220 lb (100 kg)	Jr	T. C. Williams High School	Alexandria, VA
F	30	Bill Cole (C)	6 ft 9 in (2.06 m)	215 lb (98 kg)	Jr	Richwoods High School	Peoria, IL
G	32	Demetri McCamey (C)	6 ft 3 in (1.91 m)	220 lb (100 kg)	Jr	St. Joseph High School	Bellwood, IL
G	33	Alex Legion	6 ft 5 in (1.96 m)	200 lb (91 kg)	Jr	Oak Hill Academy/University of Kentucky	Detroit, MI
F	42	Tyler Griffey	6 ft 9 in (2.06 m)	225 lb (102 kg)	Fr	Lafayette High School	Wildwood, MO
C	50	Richard Semrau	6 ft 10 in (2.08 m)	245 lb (111 kg)	RS Jr	Lutheran West High School	Grafton, OH
C	54	Mike Tisdale	7 ft 1 in (2.16 m)	235 lb (107 kg)	Jr	Riverton High School	Riverton, IL

Head coach

- Bruce Weber (Wisconsin-Milwaukee)

Assistant coach(es)

- Wayne McClain (Illinois State)
- Jay Price (Kansas)
- Jerrance Howard (Illinois)
- Gary Nottingham (Glenville State)
- Sean Harrington (Illinois)

Legend

- (C) Team captain
- (S) Suspended
- (I) Ineligible
- (W) Walk-on
- Injured
- Current redshirt

Roster
Last update: 2010-01-14

== Schedule ==
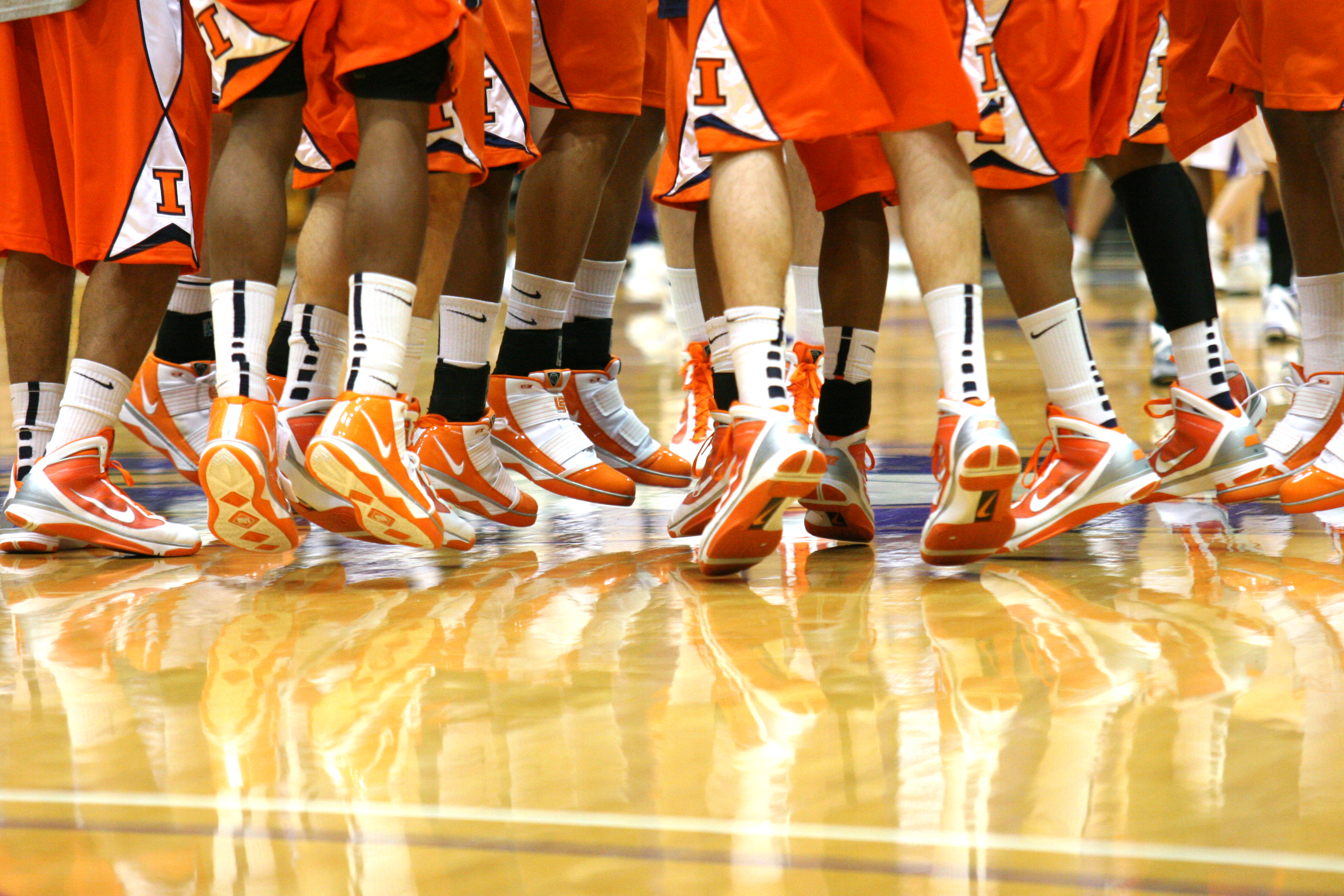
Fighting Illini feet

Date time, TV	Rank^{#}	Opponent^{#}	Result	Record	Site (attendance) city, state
Exhibition
Fri, Oct 30, 2009*; 7:00pm, BTN.com	No. 23	Missouri Southern	W 95–67		Assembly Hall (14,454); Champaign, IL
Sun, Nov 8, 2009*; 4:00pm, BTN.com	No. 23	Quincy	W 84–63		Assembly Hall (14,451); Champaign, IL
Non-Conference regular season
Fri, Nov 13, 2009*; 7:00pm, ESPN360	No. 23	SIU Edwardsville	W 96–69	1–0	Assembly Hall (16,012); Champaign, IL
Tue, Nov 17, 2009*; 7:00pm, ESPN360	No. 23	Northern Illinois	W 80–61	2–0	Assembly Hall (14,979); Champaign, IL
Sat, Nov 21, 2009*; 7:00pm, BTN	No. 23	Presbyterian; Las Vegas Invitational	W 94–48	3–0	Assembly Hall (13,121); Champaign, IL
Tue, Nov 24, 2009*; 8:30pm, ESPNU	No. 21	Wofford; Las Vegas Invitational	W 78–64	4–0	Assembly Hall (12,982); Champaign, IL
Fri, Nov 27, 2009*; 9:30pm, HoopsTV	No. 21	vs. Utah; Las Vegas Invitational	L 58–60	4–1	Orleans Arena (N/A); Las Vegas, NV
Sat, Nov 28, 2009*; 7:00pm, HoopsTV	No. 21	vs. Bradley; Las Vegas Invitational	L 68–72	4–2	Orleans Arena (N/A); Las Vegas, NV
Wed, Dec 2, 2009*; 6:15pm, ESPN		at No. 18 Clemson; ACC – Big Ten Challenge	W 76–74	5–2	Littlejohn Coliseum (10,000); Clemson, SC
Sat, Dec 5, 2009*; 6:30pm, BTN		Boise St	W 84–77	6–2	Assembly Hall (15,903); Champaign, IL
Tue, Dec 8, 2009*; 7:30pm, BTN		Vanderbilt	W 79–68	7–2	Assembly Hall (15,594); Champaign, IL
Sun, Dec 13, 2009*; 1:30pm, BTN		Western Michigan	W 88–53	8–2	Assembly Hall (14,886); Champaign, IL
Sat, Dec 19, 2009*; 6:00pm, ESPNU		at Georgia	L 67–70	8–3	Arena at Gwinnett Center (4,008); Duluth, GA
Wed, Dec 23, 2009*; 8:30pm, ESPN2		vs. Missouri; Braggin' Rights	L 68–81	8–4	Scottrade Center (20,497); St. Louis, MO
Big Ten regular season
Wed, Dec 30, 2009; 8:00pm, BTN		No. 25 Northwestern; Rivalry	W 89–83 ^{OT}	9–4 (1–0)	Assembly Hall (16,618); Champaign, IL
Sat, Jan 2, 2010*; 12:00pm, CBS		vs. Gonzaga	L 83–85 ^{OT}	9–5	United Center (20,917); Chicago, IL
Tue, Jan 5, 2010; 8:00pm, BTN		Iowa; Rivalry	W 59–42	10–5 (2–0)	Assembly Hall (14,806); Champaign, IL
Sat, Jan 9, 2010; 7:00pm, BTN		at Indiana; Rivalry	W 66–60	11–5 (3–0)	Assembly Hall (16,634); Bloomington, IN
Tue, Jan 12, 2010; 8:00pm, BTN		Penn State	W 54–53	12–5 (4–0)	Assembly Hall (14,469); Champaign, IL
Sat, Jan 16, 2010; 2:30pm, CBS		at No. 7 Michigan State	L 63–73	12–6 (4–1)	Breslin Center (14,759); East Lansing, MI
Tue, Jan 19, 2010; 8:00pm, ESPN		No. 13 Purdue	L 78–84	12–7 (4–2)	Assembly Hall (16,618); Champaign, IL
Sat, Jan 23, 2010; 7:00pm, BTN		at Northwestern; Rivalry	L 68–73	12–8 (4–3)	Welsh-Ryan Arena (8,117); Evanston, IL
Wed, Jan 27, 2010; 5:30pm, BTN		at Penn State	W 77–67	13–8 (5–3)	Bryce Jordan Center (8,085); University Park, PA
Sat, Jan 30, 2010; 1:00pm, ESPN2		Indiana; Rivalry	W 72–70	14–8 (6–3)	Assembly Hall (16,618); Champaign, IL
Wed, Feb 3, 2010; 7:30pm, BTN		at Iowa; Rivalry	W 57–49	15–8 (7–3)	Carver-Hawkeye Arena (11,441); Iowa City, IA
Sat, Feb 6, 2010; 8:00pm, ESPN		No. 5 Michigan State; ESPN College GameDay	W 78–73	16–8 (8–3)	Assembly Hall (16,618); Champaign, IL
Tue, Feb 9, 2010; 6:00pm, BTN		at No. 11 Wisconsin	W 63–56	17–8 (9–3)	Kohl Center (17,230); Madison, WI
Sun, Feb 14, 2010; 12:00pm, CBS		No. 13 Ohio State	L 53–72	17–9 (9–4)	Assembly Hall (16,616); Champaign, IL
Sat, Feb 20, 2010; 3:00pm, ESPN		at No. 4 Purdue	L 65–75	17–10 (9–5)	Mackey Arena (14,123); West Lafayette, IN
Tue, Feb 23, 2010; 6:00pm, ESPN		at Michigan	W 51–44	18–10 (10–5)	Crisler Arena (11,357); Ann Arbor, MI
Sat, Feb 27, 2010; 3:00pm, BTN		Minnesota	L 60–62	18–11 (10–6)	Assembly Hall (16,618); Champaign, IL
Tue, March 2, 2010; 8:00pm, ESPN		at No. 6 Ohio State	L 57–73	18–12 (10–7)	Schottenstein Center (16,177); Columbus, OH
Sun, March 8, 2010; 1:00pm, ESPN		No. 15 Wisconsin	L 57–72	18–13 (10–8)	Assembly Hall (16,618); Champaign, IL
Big Ten tournament
Fri, Mar 12, 2010; 1:30pm, ESPN	(5)	vs. (4) No. 13 Wisconsin; Quarterfinals	W 58–54	19–13	Conseco Fieldhouse (16,207); Indianapolis, IN
Sat, Mar 13, 2010; 12:40pm, CBS	(5)	vs. (1) No. 5 Ohio State; Semifinals	L 81–88 ^{2 OT}	19–14	Conseco Fieldhouse (N/A); Indianapolis, IN
National Invitation Tournament
Wed, Mar 17, 2010*; 8:00pm, ESPNU	(1)	at (8) Stony Brook; First Round	W 76–66	20–14	Stony Brook Arena (4,423); Stony Brook, NY
Mon, Mar 22, 2010*; 7:00pm, ESPNU	(1)	(4) Kent State; Second Round	W 75–58	21–14	Assembly Hall (10,032); Champaign, IL
Wed, Mar 24, 2010*; 9:00pm, ESPN2	(1)	(3) Dayton; Quarterfinals	L 71–77	21–15	Assembly Hall (8,548); Champaign, IL
*Non-conference game. ^{#}Rankings from AP Poll. (#) Tournament seedings in parentheses. All times are in Central Time.

The March 17, 2010 NIT first-round game was hosted by Stony Brook due to a previously scheduled performance by Cirque du Soleil at Assembly Hall.

== Season statistics ==
Legend
GP	Games played	GS	Games started	Avg	Average per game
FG	Field-goals made	FGA	Field-goal attempts	Off	Offensive rebounds
Def	Defensive rebounds	A	Assists	TO	Turnovers
Blk	Blocks	Stl	Steals	High	Team high

Individual player statistics
			Minutes		Scoring		Total FGs			3-point FGs			Free-throws			Rebounds							
Player	GP	GS	Tot	Avg	Pts	Avg	FG	FGA	Pct	3FG	3FA	Pct	FT	FTA	Pct	Off	Def	Tot	Avg	A	TO	Blk	Stl
McCamey, Demetri	36	34	1241	34.5	542	15.1	191	421	.454	56	164	.341	104	147	.707	17	112	129	3.6	254	123	5	53
Tisdale, Mike	36	36	1006	27.9	429	11.9	165	282	.585	5	6	.833	94	112	.839	77	139	216	6.0	28	50	59	12
Davis, Mike	36	32	1161	32.2	385	10.7	172	364	.473	0	0	.000	41	65	.631	81	249	330	9.2	34	53	23	18
Richardson, D.J.	36	35	1112	30.9	379	10.5	124	311	.399	69	177	.390	62	80	.775	18	79	97	2.7	75	60	6	24
Paul, Brandon	36	14	682	18.9	280	7.8	93	279	.333	36	129	.279	58	90	.644	42	68	110	3.1	46	46	5	29
Keller, Dominique	35	0	399	11.4	156	4.5	66	145	.455	10	35	.286	14	27	.519	24	54	78	2.2	20	26	12	15
Cole, Bill	36	22	766	21.3	157	4.4	57	124	.460	29	77	.377	14	23	.609	38	78	116	3.2	36	24	22	24
Griffey, Tyler	32	4	270	8.4	105	3.3	42	80	.525	7	20	.350	14	16	.875	22	34	56	1.8	11	13	4	10
Legion, Alex	11	1	109	9.9	30	2.7	11	37	.297	4	19	.211	4	6	.667	0	10	10	0.9	5	4	1	3
Jordan, Jeff	33	2	454	13.8	52	1.6	22	50	.440	2	8	.250	6	10	.600	16	28	44	1.3	56	26	3	13
Semrau, Richard	15	0	67	4.5	21	1.4	9	13	.692	0	0	.000	3	5	.600	8	14	22	1.5	3	4	3	0
Chisholm, Bubba	12	0	16	1.3	7	0.6	3	12	.250	1	10	.100	0	0	.000	0	2	2	0.2	0	1	0	1
Simpson, Stan	8	0	17	2.1	4	0.5	2	9	.222	0	0	.000	0	0	.000	3	0	3	0.4	2	0	1	0
Team																50	74	124	3.4		13		
Total	36		7300		2547	70.8	957	2127	.450	219	645	.340	414	581	.713	396	941	1337	37.1	570	443	144	202
Opponents	36		7300		2406	66.8	838	2094	.400	267	831	.321	463	665	.696	407	833	1240	34.4	461	433	61	221

== Rankings ==
Poll	Pre- Season	Week 1	Week 2	Week 3	Week 4	Week 5	Week 6	Week 7	Week 8	Week 9	Week 10	Week 11	Week 12	Week 13	Week 14	Week 15	Week 16	Week 17	Week 18	Final
AP	23	23	20	(RV)	(RV)	(RV)	(RV)	--	--	--	--	--	--	(RV)	(RV)	(RV)	(RV)	--	--	
Coaches	(RV)	25	21	(RV)	(RV)	(RV)	(RV)	(RV)	--	--	--	--	--	--	(RV)	--	--	--	--	

Legend
	Increase in ranking
	Decrease in ranking
	No change
(RV)	Received votes
