= 2010 in Michigan =

- Decades: 1990s; 2000s; 2010s; 2020s
- See also: History of Michigan; Historical outline of Michigan; List of years in Michigan; 2010 in the United States

This article reviews key circumstances during 2010 in Michigan, including the state's office holders, demographics, performance of sports teams, cultural events, and a chronology of the state's top news and sports stories.

== Top stories ==
The top news stories of 2010 in Michigan included:

- Kalamazoo River oil spill resulted in the release of more than 800,000 gallons of crude oil into Talmadge Creek in Marshall that flowed into the Kalamazoo River.
- 2010 Michigan elections: Republicans swept the November elections for statewide offices, including Rick Snyder's election as Governor of Michigan.
- Criminal prosecutions in state and federal court of Detroit mayor Kwame Kilpatrick, civil litigation over the killing of Tamara Greene, and Kilpatrick's imprisonment for probation violations.
- Recovery in the automobile industry and the debut of the Chevrolet Volt.
- The attacks of 16 black men in the Flint area by a serial stabber and the arrest of Elias Abuelazam in August.
- Federal raids and prosecution of the Hutaree, a Lenawee County Christian Patriot militia group.
- The Thanksgiving disappearance of the three Skelton boys from Morenci and the arrest of their father.

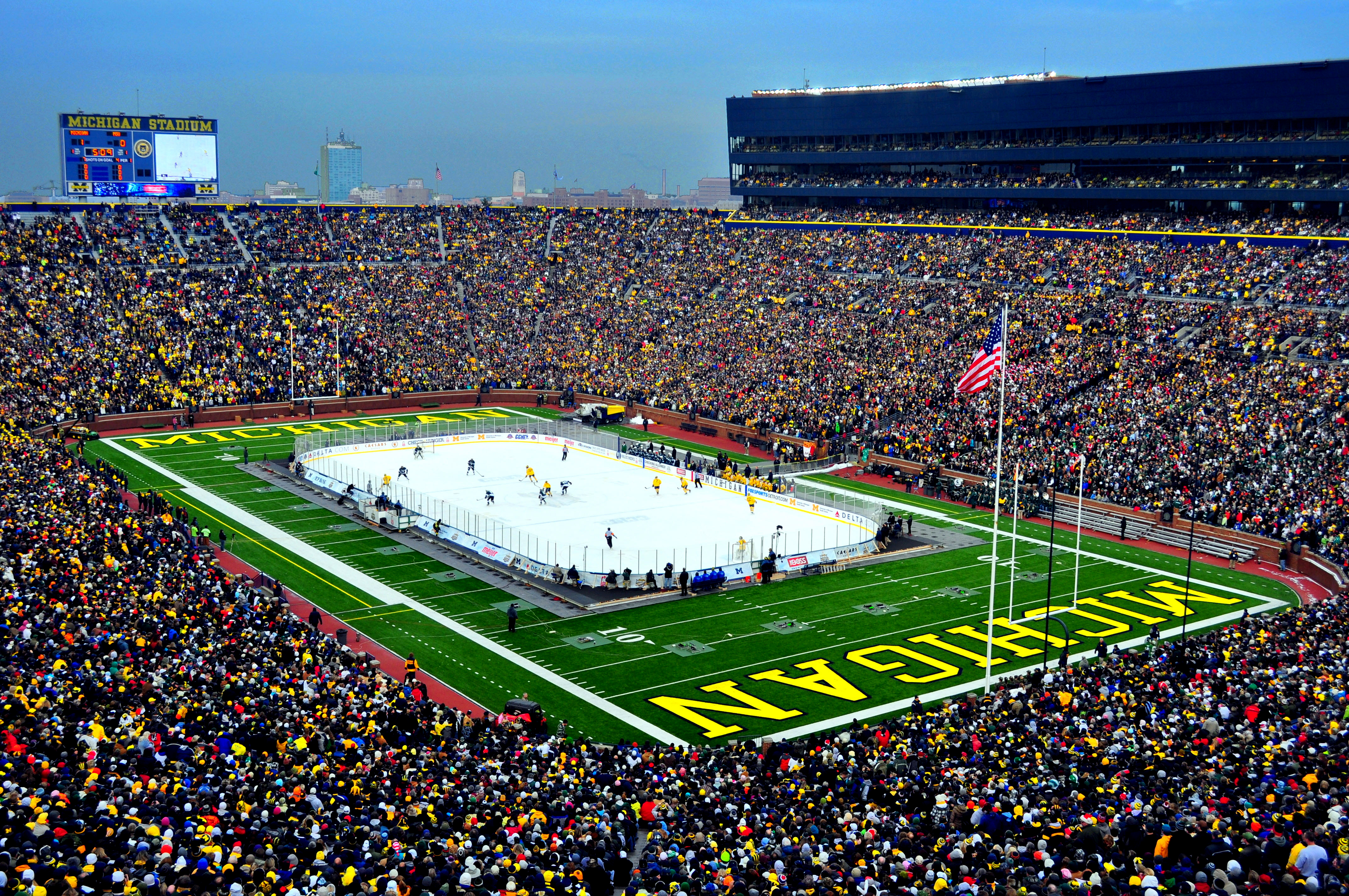
The Big Chill at the Big House

The top sports stories of 2010 in Michigan included the Michigan State football team tying for the Big Ten championship with Kirk Cousins at quarterback; the Michigan State football team advancing to the Final Four led by Draymond Green; Armando Galarraga's near-perfect game; the Detroit Red Wings compiling 44–24–14 record with Pavel Datsyuk and Henrik Zetterberg each tallyng 70 points; and The Big Chill at the Big House setting a hockey record with over 100,000 in attendance.

Notable deaths connected to Michigan included Detroit Tigers radio announcer Ernie Harwell, Detroit Tigers managers Sparky Anderson and Ralph Houk, Michigan football legend Ron Kramer, Michigan and Detroit Tigers baseball player Steve Boros, Detroit Red Wings enforcer Bob Probert, The Knack guitarist and singer Doug Fieger, Gumby creator Art Clokey, and Presidential press secretary Jerald terHorst.

== Office holders ==
=== State office holders ===
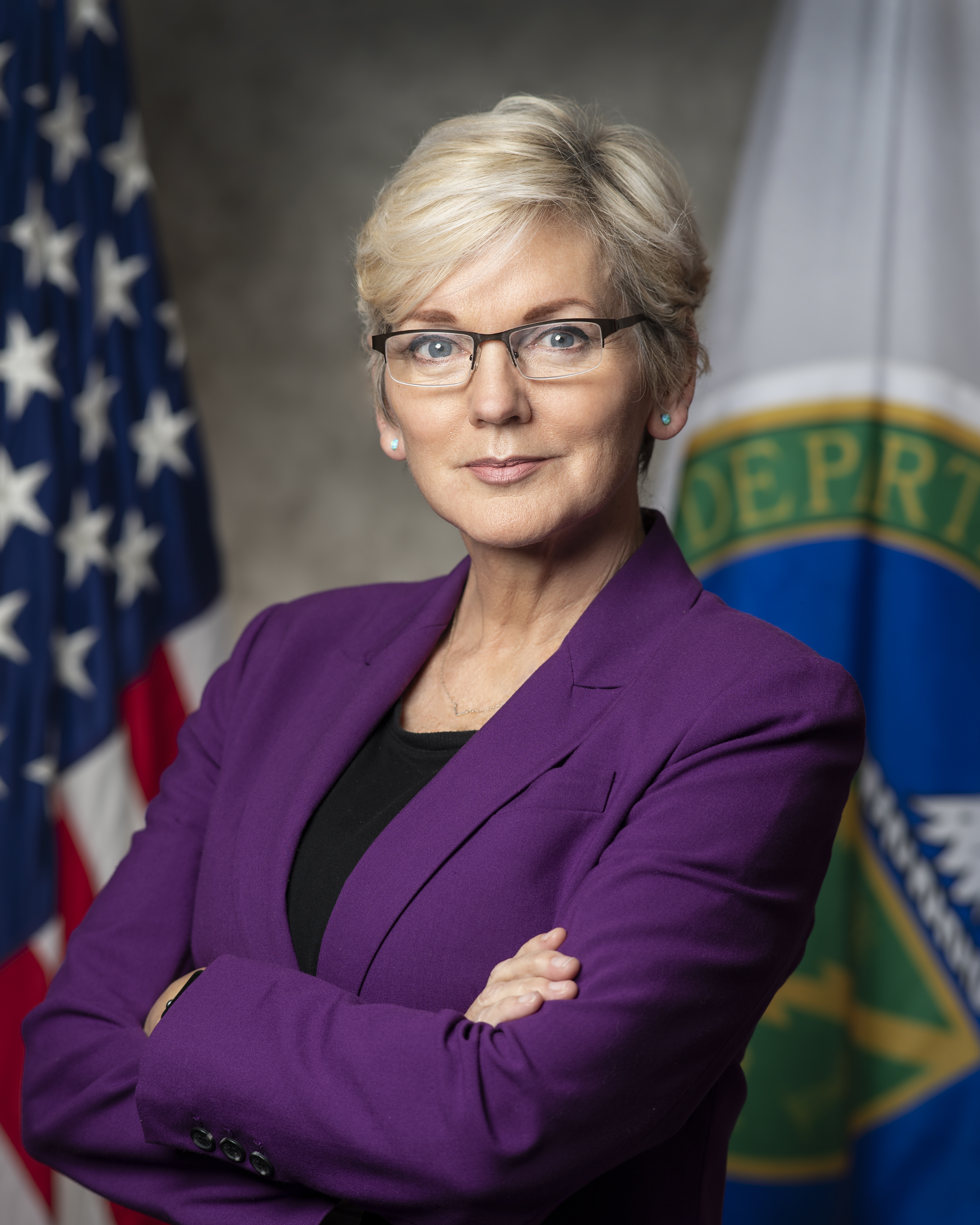
Jennifer Granholm

- Governor of Michigan - Jennifer Granholm (Democrat)
- Lieutenant Governor of Michigan: John D. Cherry (Democrat)
- Michigan Attorney General - Mike Cox (Republican)
- Michigan Secretary of State - Terri Lynn Land (Republican)
- Speaker of the Michigan House of Representatives: Andy Dillon (Democrat)
- Majority Leader of the Michigan Senate: Mike Bishop (Republican)
- Chief Justice, Michigan Supreme Court: Marilyn Jean Kelly

=== Federal office holders ===
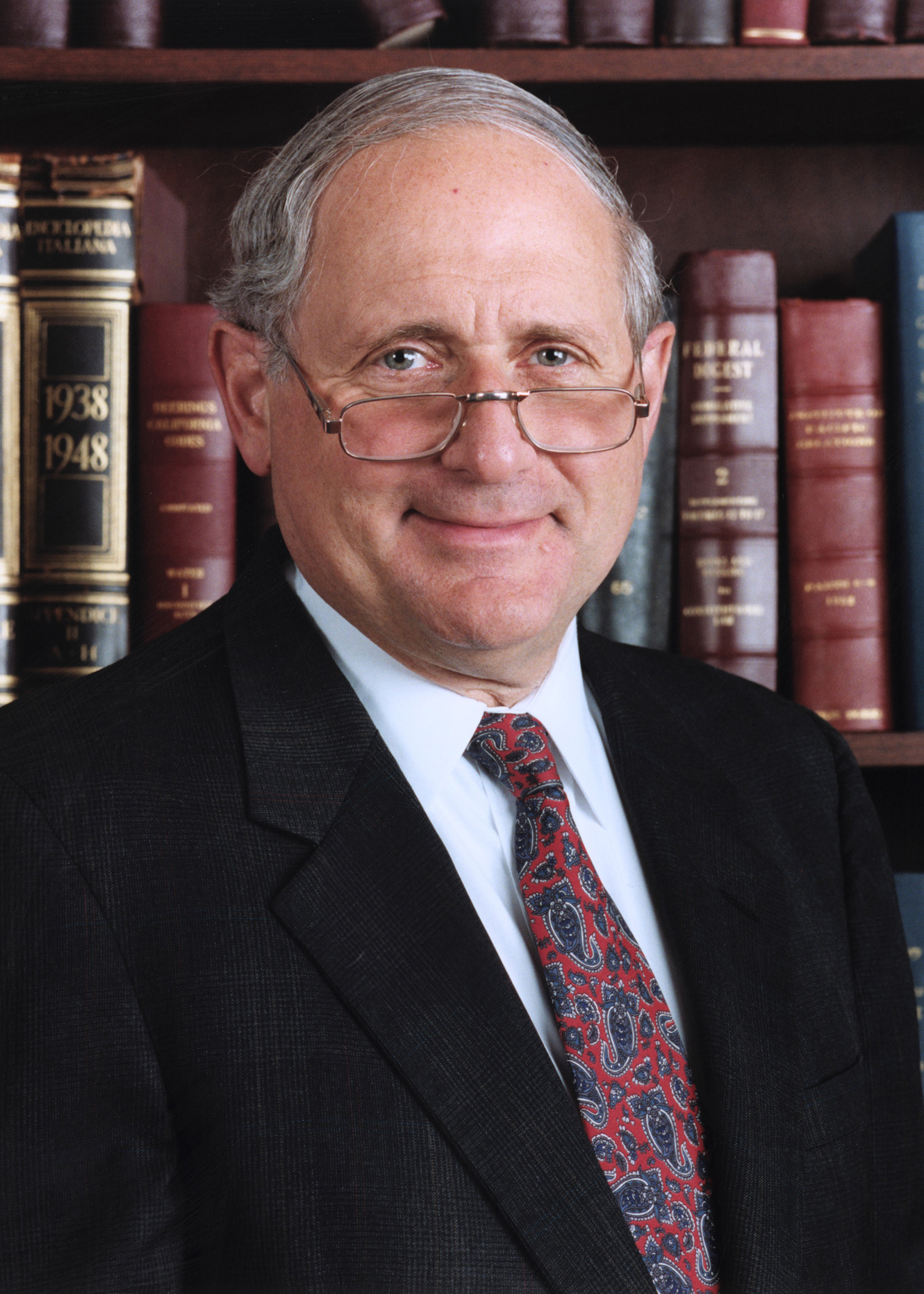
Carl Levin

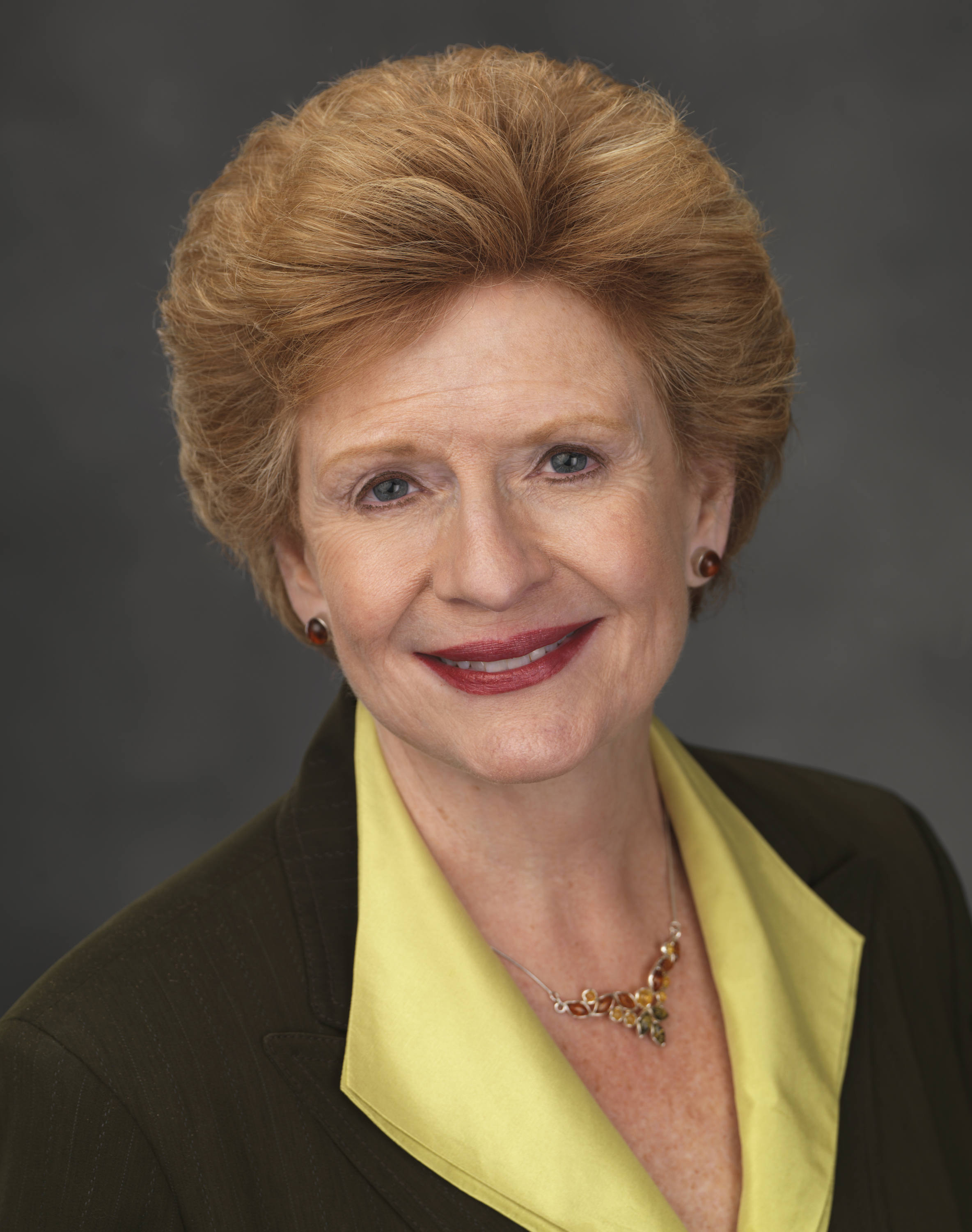
Debbie Stabenow

- U.S. Senator from Michigan - Carl Levin (Democrat)
- U.S. Senator from Michigan - Debbie Stabenow (Democrat)
- House District 1: Bart Stupak (Democrat)
- House District 2: Pete Hoekstra (Republican)
- House District 3: Vern Ehlers (Republican)
- House District 4: Dave Camp (Republican)
- House District 5: Dale Kildee (Democrat)
- House District 6: Fred Upton (Republican)
- House District 7: Tim Walberg (Republican)
- House District 8: Mike Rogers (Republican)
- House District 9: Gary Peters (Democrat)
- House District 10: Candice Miller (Republican)
- House District 11: Thaddeus McCotter (Republican)
- House District 12: Sander Levin (Democrat)
- House District 13: Carolyn Cheeks Kilpatrick (Democrat)
- House District 14: John Conyers (Democrat)
- House District 15: John Dingell (Democrat)

=== Mayors of major cities ===
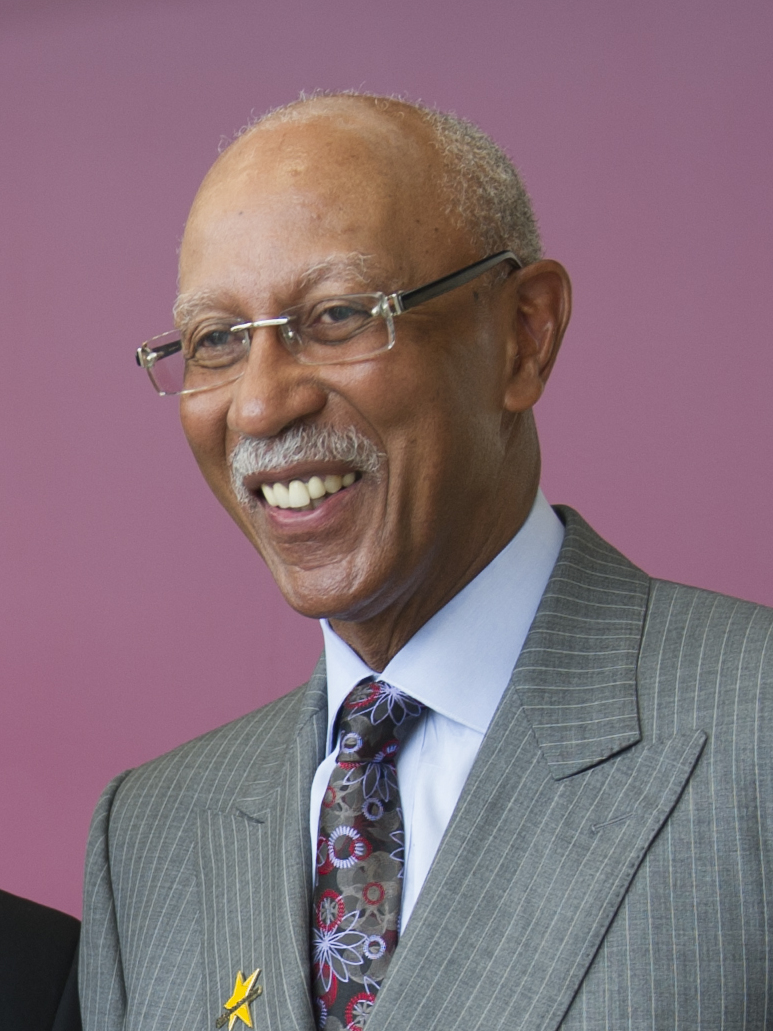
Dave Bing

- Mayor of Detroit: - Dave Bing (Democrat)
- Mayor of Grand Rapids: - George Heartwell
- Mayor of Ann Arbor: John Hieftje (Democrat)
- Mayor of Lansing: Virgil Bernero
- Mayor of Flint: Dayne Walling
- Mayor of Saginaw: Greg Branch

== Demographics ==
Michigan had a population as recorded in the 2010 U.S. Census of 9,883,640, a decline of 0.8% from the 2000 Census which recorded Michigan's population at 9,948,444. The decline was attributable principally to a drop of over 235,000 in the population of the state's largest city, Detroit. It was the first and only decade in the state's history during which the population decreased. The upward trend resumed in the 2010s with the population increasing to 10,077,331 (a 2.0% increase) in 2020.

The following is a list of the 25 largest Michigan cities based on 2010 U.S. Census data. Historic census data from 2000 and 2020 is included to reflect trends in population increases or decreases. Cities that are part of Metro Detroit are shaded in tan.

2010 Rank	City	County	2000 Pop.	2010 Pop.	2020 Pop.	Change 2000–2010
1	Detroit	Wayne	951,270	713,777	639,111	−25.0% ▼
2	Grand Rapids	Kent	197,800	188,036	198,917	−4.9% ▼
3	Warren	Macomb	138,247	134,056	139,387	−3.0% ▼
4	Sterling Heights	Macomb	124,471	129,699	134,346	5.6% ▲
5	Lansing	Ingham	119,128	114,297	112,644	−4.1% ▼
6	Ann Arbor	Washtenaw	114,024	113,934	123,851	0.1% ▼
7	Flint	Genesee	124,943	102,434	81,252	−18.0% ▼
8	Dearborn	Wayne	97,775	98,153	109,976	0.5%▲
9	Livonia	Wayne	100,545	96,942	95,535	−3.6% ▼
10	Westland	Wayne	86,602	84,094	85,420	−2.9% ▼
11	Troy	Oakland	80,959	80,980	87,294	0.0% ▲
12	Farmington Hills	Oakland	82,111	79,740	83,986	−2.9% ▼
13	Kalamazoo	Kalamazoo	76,145	74,262	73,598	−2.6% ▼
14	Wyoming	Kent	69,368	72,125	76,501	4.0% ▲
15	Southfield	Oakland	78,322	71,758	76,618	−8.4% ▼
16	Rochester Hills	Oakland	68,825	70,995	76,300	3.2% ▲
17	Taylor	Wayne	65,868	63,131	63,409	−4.2% ▼
18	St. Clair Shores	Macomb	63,096	59,715	58,874	−5.4% ▼
19	Pontiac	Oakland	66,337	59,515	61,607	−10.3% ▼
20	Dearborn Heights	Wayne	58,264	57.774	63,292	−0.8% ▼
21	Royal Oak	Oakland	60,062	57,236	58,211	−4.7% ▼
22	Novi	Oakland	47,386	55,224	66,243	16.5% ▲
23	Battle Creek	Calhoun	53,364	52,347	52,721	−1.9% ▼
24	Saginaw	Saginaw	61,799	51,508	44,202	−16.7% ▼
25	Kentwood	Kent	45,255	48,707	54,304	7.6% ▲

== Sports ==
=== Baseball ===
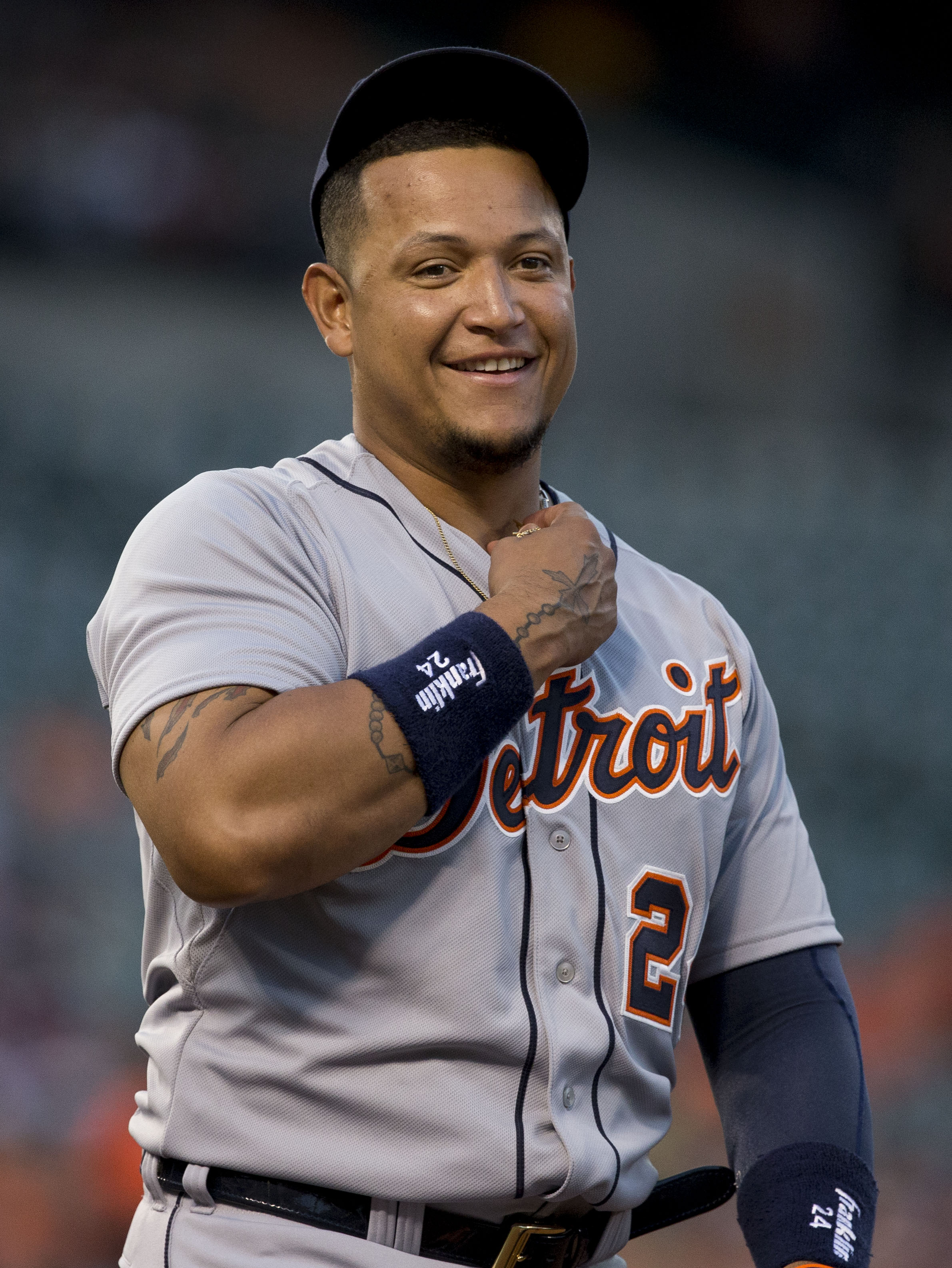
Miguel Cabrera

- 2010 Detroit Tigers season - In their fifth year under manager Jim Leyland, the Tigers compiled an 81–81 record. The team's statistical leaders included Miguel Cabrera (.328 batting average, 38 home runs, and 126 RBIs), Justin Verlander (18 wins, 219 strikeouts) and Joel Zumaya (2.58 earned run average). Highlights included Armando Galarraga's near-perfect game.

=== American football ===
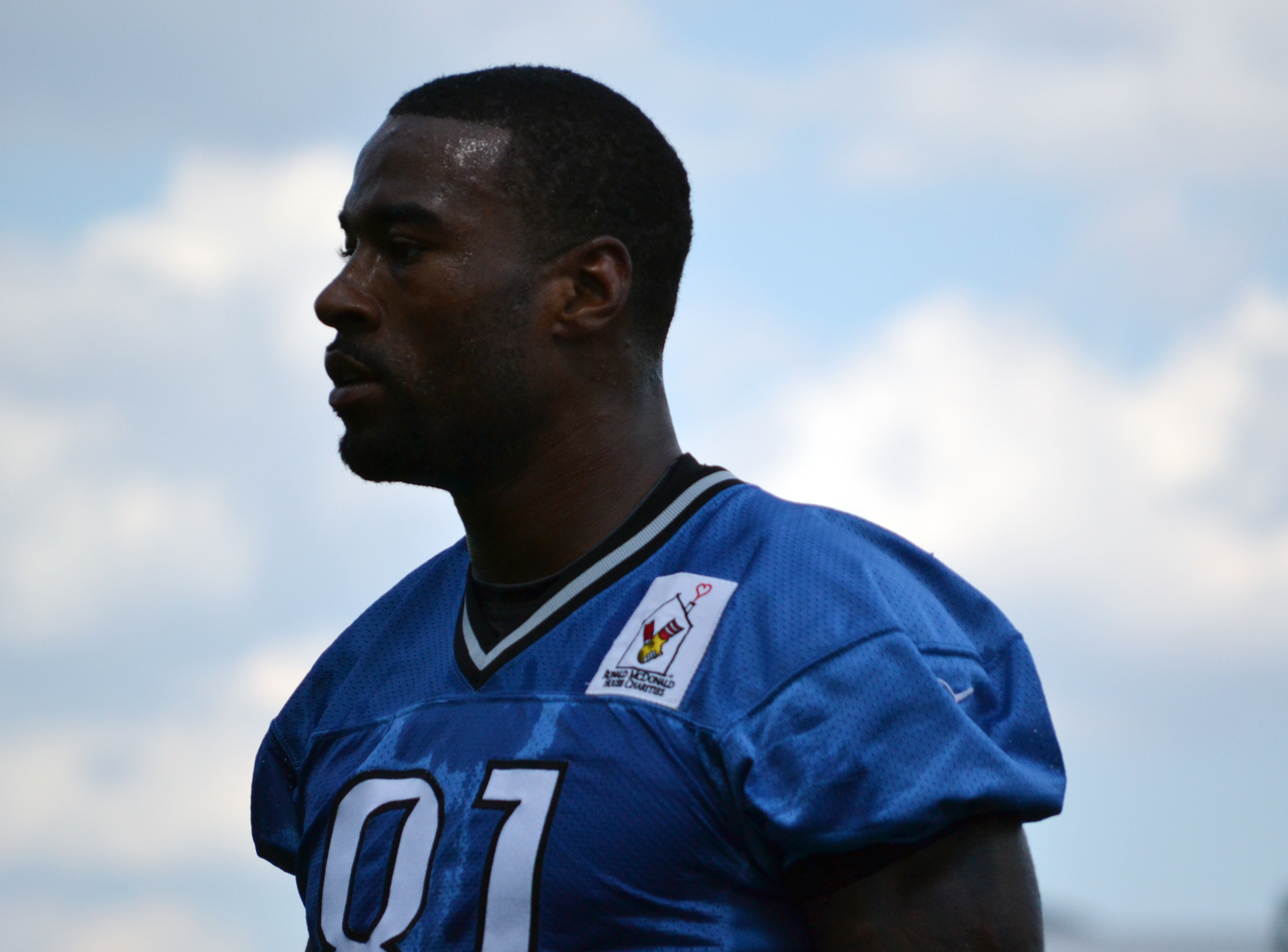
Calvin Johnson

- 2010 Detroit Lions season - In their second season under head coach Jim Schwartz, the Lions compiled a 6–10 record. Ndamukong Suh and Calvin Johnson were selected to the Pro Bowl.
- 2010 Michigan State Spartans football team - In their fourth season under head coach Mark Dantonio, the Spartans compiled an 11–2 record and tied for the Big Ten championship. The team's statistical leaders included Kirk Cousins (2,825 passing yards) and Edwin Baker (1,201 rushing yards).
- 2010 Michigan Wolverines football team - In their final season under head coach Rich Rodriguez, the Wolverines compiled a 7–6. Denard Robinson was selected as the team's most valuable player.

=== Basketball ===
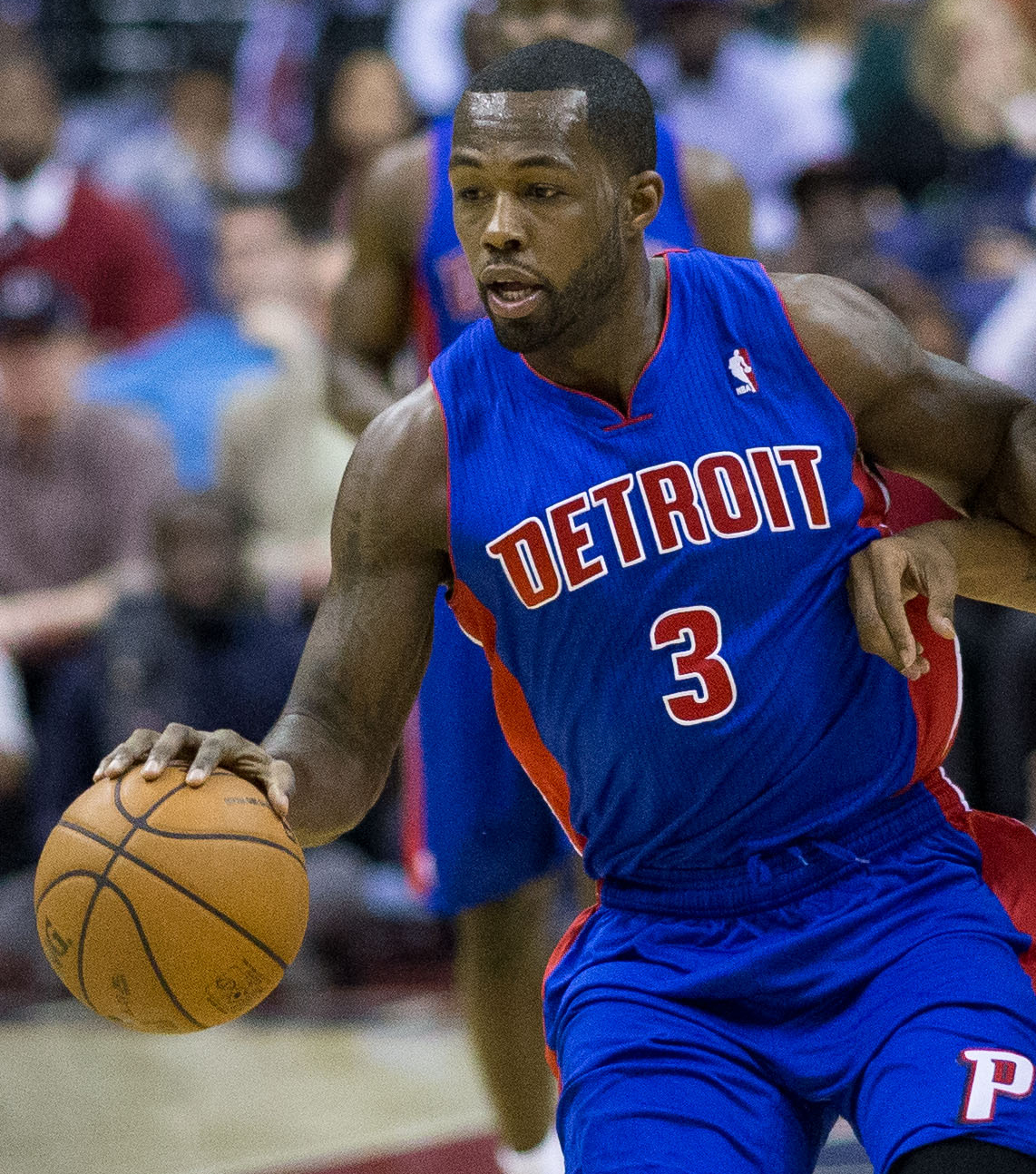
Rodney Stuckey

- 2009–10 Detroit Pistons season - In their first year under head coach John Kuester, the Pistons compiled a 27–55 record. The team's statistical leaders included Rodney Stuckey (1,215 points, 348 assists) and Ben Wallace (597 rebounds).
- 2009–10 Michigan State Spartans men's basketball team - 28–9, advanced to Final Four, Draymond Green
- 2009–10 Michigan Wolverines men's basketball team - 15–17, DeShawn Sims and Manny Harris MVPs

=== Ice hockey ===
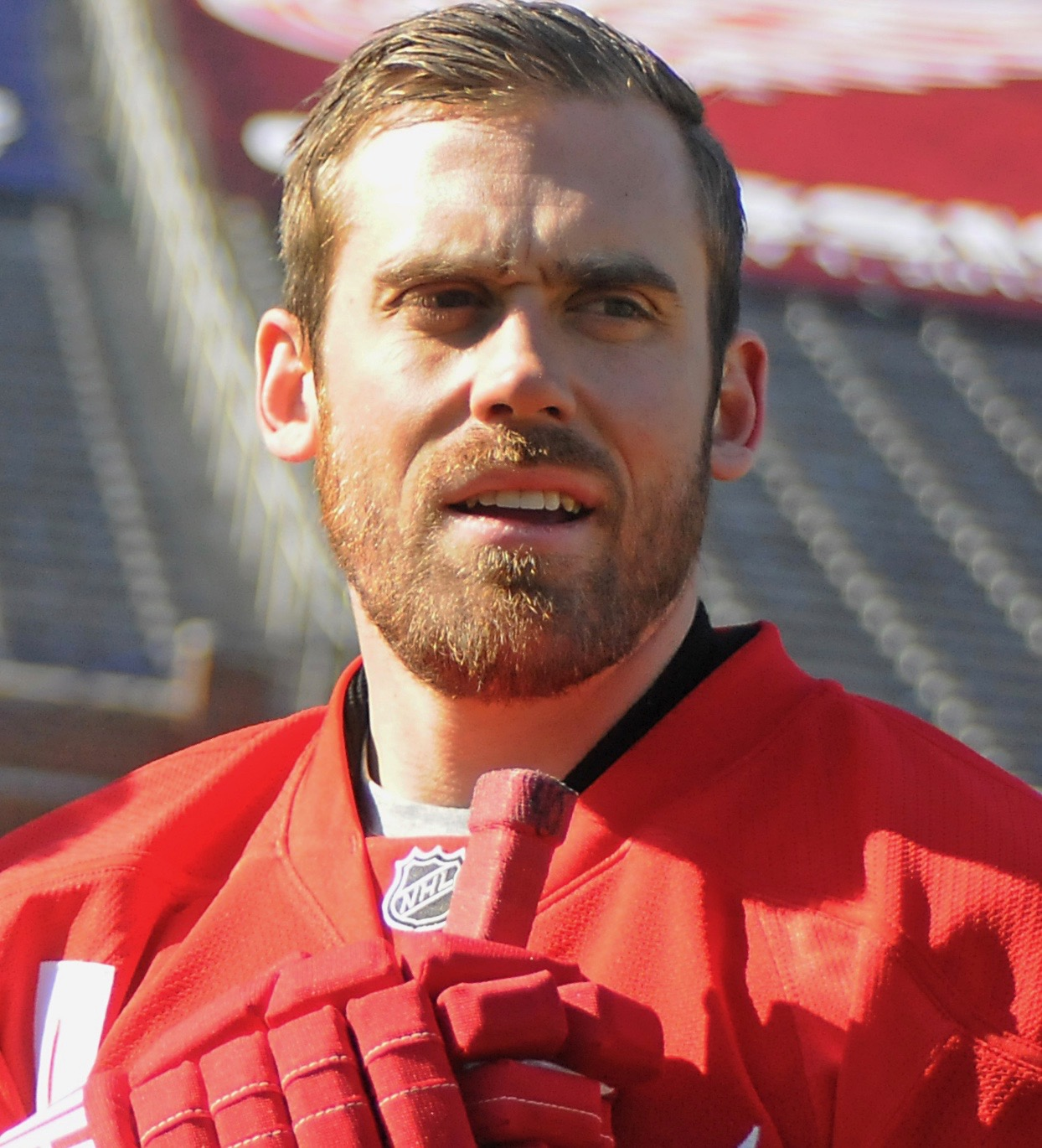
Henrik Zetterberg

- 2009–10 Detroit Red Wings season - In their fifth season under head coach Mike Babcock, the Red Wings compiled a 44–24–14 record. Nicklas Lidstrom was the team captain. Pavel Datsyuk and Henrik Zetterberg each tallied 70 points.
- 2009–10 Michigan Wolverines men's ice hockey season - Led by head coach Red Berenson, the Wolverines compiled a 17-15-1 record. Highlights of the season included The Big Chill at the Big House.

=== Other ===
- 2010 Carfax 400
- 2010 Heluva Good! Sour Cream Dips 400
- Detroit Free Press Marathon

== Chronology of events ==
=== January ===
- January 6 - Umar Farouk Abdulmutallab, a 23-year-old Nigerian national who became known as the "Underwear bomber", was indicted for his bombing attempt on Northwest Airlines Flight 253 as it approached Detroit on Christmas Day 2009. The defendant used chemical explosives sewn into his underwear. While a small explosion and fire occurred, the exposive device failed to detonate properly. The government asked for the death penalty. He was arraigned on January 8.
- January 20 - After hearing six days of testimony from former Detroit Mayor Kwame Kilpatrick, Wayne County Circuit Court Judge David Groner concluded that Kilpatrick's testimony was not credible and that his conduct was "reprehensible", ordering Kilpatrick to pay $320,000 in restitution to the city within 90 days or face jail.
- January 28 - Ford reported a $2.8 billion profit for 2009. The announcement marked a reversal from $30 billion in losses sustained from 2005 to 2008.

=== February ===
- February 2 - DeDan Milton, an aide and childhood friend of former Detroit Mayor Kwame Kilpatrick, pleaded guilty to bribery and extortion conspiracy as part of a plea deal requiring him to cooperate in the prosecution of Kilpatrick.
- February 3 - Justin Verlander signed a five-year, $80 million contract with the Tigers.
- February 7 - Dick LeBeau was selected for induction into the Pro Football Hall of Fame as a player.
- February 8 - The federal government agreed to spend $78 million to control the spread of Asian carp in the Great Lakes.
- February 20 - Outfielder Johnny Damon signed a one-year, $8-million contract with the Tigers.
- February 22 - Two pairs who trained at a Canton ice skating club (Tessa Virtue / Scott Moir and Meryl Davis / Charlie White) won the gold and silver medals in the ice dancing competition at the Winter Olympics.
- February 23 - The NCAA accused Michigan football under Rich Rodriguez of five potential major violations.

=== March ===
- March 4 - Cobo Center contractor Karl Kado was sentenced by U.S. District Judge Marianne Battani to community service and probation as part of a deal to cooperate in the public corrumption probe of Detroit City Hall.
- March 9 - Former Detroit Mayor Kwame Kilpatrick was arraigned In Wayne County Circuit Court for probation violation, having failed to make his court-ordered restitution payments of $79,011 per month.
- March 10 - Former Detroit City Council president pro tempore Monica Conyers was sentenced by U.S. District Judge Avern Cohn to 37 months in prison and two years of probation, following her conviction for accepting bribes. She began serving her sentence at a federal prison camp in West Virginia, nicknamed Camp Cupcake, on September 10.
- March 15 - The Stooges were inducted into the Rock and Roll Hall of Fame, the 17th Detroit act to be so honored.
- March 25 - Dick Purtan retired after 45 years on Detroit radio.
- March 28 - Michigan State defeated Tennessee to advance to the Final Four.
- March 31 - Federal prosecutors in a press conference announced prosecution of nine members of the Hutaree, a Lenawee County Christian Patriot militia group, and the discovery of bombs intended to be used in an uprising against the government. The prosecutors alleged that the defendants intended to kill a police officer and bomb the funeral. In the end, three defendants pleaded guilty to possession of a machine gun; all of the more serious charges were dismissed in 2012.
- March 31 - The White House announced that it was purchasing the first 100 Chevrolet Volts to roll off the assembly line.

=== April ===
- April 3 - Michigan State lost to Butler, 52–50, in the Final Four.
- April 9 - Nine-term Democrat Congressman Bart Stupak from the Upper Peninsula announced he would not run for reelection following Tea Party opposition over his vote in support of Obama's healthcare legislation.
- April 10 - Boston College won the NCAA hockey championship at Ford Field.
- April 12 - Affidavits from two former Detroit police officers in the Tamara Greene case asserted that police officials tried to cover up an investigation into the former mayor Kilpatrick's alleged wild party at the Manoogian Mansion and the killing of Greene.
- April 16 - Gov. Jennifer Granholm and other leaders held a press conference urging the legislature to support construction of a second bridge across the Detroit River.
- April 20 - A Wayne County judge found Kwame Kilpatrick had hidden assets and otherwise violated terms of his probation. Sentencing was set for May 25.
- April 22 - The Detroit Lions selected defensive tackle Ndamukong Suh with the second pick in the NFL draft.
- April 27 - Ford announced a $2.1 billion profit for the first quarter.
- April 29 - Canada offered to pay $550 million to cover Michigan's share of a new bridge across the Detroit River.

=== May ===
- May 1 - A statewide ban on smoking in bars and restaurants went into effect.
- May 1 - President Barack Obama delvered the commencement address at the University of Michigan in Ann Arbor.
- May 16 - Miss Michigan Rima Fakih of Dearborn won the Miss USA contest, the first Arab American woman and the third woman from Michigan to win the title.
- May 16 - Killing of Aiyana Jones: A seven-year-old African American girl was shot and killed by police officer Joseph Weekley during a raid conducted by the Detroit Police Department's Special Response (SRT) team. The team was targeting a suspect in the apartment a floor above Jones' home. Her death drew national media attention and calls for prosecution of Weekley. Weekley was charged with involuntary manslaughter and reckless endangerment, but trials in 2013 and 2014 ended in mistrials and/or partial dismissal by the trial judge. The prosecutor dropped the remaining charge in 2015.
- May 17 - General Motors announced an $865 million profit for the first quarter, it first profitable quarter since 2007.
- May 25 - Wayne County Judge David Groner sentenced Kwame Kilpatrick to 18 months to five years in prison for probation violations, including lying under oath.

=== June ===
- June 2 - Ford Motor Company announced it was discontinuing its Mercury line. The Mercury line was created by Edsel Ford in 1938 to offer a middle range of vehicles between the company's Ford and Lincoln products.
- June 2 - Armando Galarraga's near-perfect game: On June 2, pitcher Armando Galarraga retired the first 26 batters, but his bid for a perfect game was ruined one out short when first-base umpire Jim Joyce incorrectly ruled that Indians batter Jason Donald reached first base safely on a ground ball.
- June 15 - Basketball coach Tom Izzo rejected offer to coach Cleveland Cavaliers, saying he would remain at Michigan State for life.
- June 22 - Jimmy Devellano inducted into Hockey Hall of Fame.
- June 23 - Former Detroit Mayor Kwame Kilpatrick was charged by federal prosecutor with 19 count of fraud and tax evasion

=== July ===
- July 20 - A Detroit Free Press analysis reported that General Motors, Chrysler and GMAC had already repaid $74 billion of the $86 billion loaned by the government in 2008 and 2009.
- July 23 - A Cessna 206 aircraft taking Alma school superintendent Don Pavlik to the Mayo Clinic for cancer treatment crashed into Lake Michigan. Four of the five aboard the plane were killed. The pilot, Jerry Freed, survived.
- July 25 - Kalamazoo River oil spill resulted in the release of more than 800,000 gallons of crude oil into Talmadge Creek in Marshall that flowed into the Kalamazoo River. The oil leaked from a 30-inch pipeline owned by Enbridge Energy Partners. The leak was not discovered immediately, causing the spill to continue for 17 hours. The spill covered 35 miles of river before it was stopped. It was one of the worst inland oil spills in American history. The section that ruptured was found to be cracked and corroding five years before the spill, but Enbridge contended that the pipeline was in good condition.

=== August ===
- August 3 - Primary election day in Michigan.

- In the Democratic gubernatorial primary, Lansing mayor Virg Bernero received 309,235 votes (58.6%) to defeat Speaker of the Michigan House Andy Dillon who received 218,883 votes (41.4%).
- In the Republican gubernatorial primary, accountant and businessman Rick Snyder won with 381,327 votes (36.4%), defeating Congressman Peter Hoekstra (26.8%), Michigan Attorney General Mike Cox (23.0%), and Michigan Senator Mike Bouchard (12.2%).
- State Senator Hansen Clarke upset seven-term Congresswoman Carolyn Cheeks Kilpatrick in the primary for Kilpatrick's House seat. Kilpatrick's loss was attributed in the press to the scandals involving her son and former Detroit Mayor Kwame Kilpatrick. Clarke, born "Molik Hashim", became the first U.S. Congressman of Bangladeshi descent.

- August 6 - Ford disclosed that it recently paid executive chairman William Clay Ford Jr. $4.2 million in salary for 2008, 2009, and 2010, and stock options valued at $11.6 million. He had not drawn a salary for the past five years.
- August 11 - Elias Abuelazam, a suspect in the Flint serial stabbing case, was arrested in Atlanta while trying to board a flight to Israel. He was flown to Flint on August 26. The Flint serial slasher had attacked 16 black men, killing five, since May. He was later convicted and sentenced to life in prison.
- August 12 - General Motors announced that Daniel Akerson would take over as CEO effective September 1, replacing Edward Whitacre Jr.
- August 16 - Quicken Loans opened its new headquarters in downtown Detroit, moving from its previous location in Livonia. The first 700 of 1,700 workers arrived at the new site on August 16.
- August 21 - Woodward Dream Cruise

=== September ===
- September 2 - Eminem and Jay-Z appeared in concert for the first of two shows at Comerica Park before a crowd of 42,000.
- September 7 - Detroit 1-8-7, a television show shot in Detroit, starring Michael Imperioli, and focusing on a Detroit homicide unit, held its debut screening for community leaders at the MGM Grand Detroit. The network debut followed on September 21.
- September 8 - Contractor Bobby Ferguson, a friend of former Detroit Mayor Kwame Kilpatrick, was indicted for federal financial crimes after raids found $261,500 in cash in his office safe and condominiums in Detroit and Southfield recorded in names of others.
- September 18 - Michigan State defeated Notre Dame in overtime on a fake field goal that resulted in the winning touchdown pass. Michigan State coach Mark Dantonio suffered a heart attack after the game.

=== October ===
- October 10 - Gubernatorial debate on Detroit Public Television between Virg Bernero and Rick Snyder
- October 13 - In a 17-page report, the FBI cleared all federal agents of wrongdoing in firing 20 bullets at Imam Luqman Ameen Abdullah during a raid of a Dearborn warehouse.

=== November ===
- November 2 - 2010 Michigan elections: Republicans swept the November elections for statewide offices and both houses of the Michigan legislature. Key contests included:

- 2010 Michigan gubernatorial election - Rick Snyder received 1,874,834 votes (58.11%), defeating Brenda Lawrence who received 1,287,320 votes (39.9%).
- 2010 Michigan Attorney General election - Bill Schuette (52.59%) defeated David Leyton (43.48%).
- 2010 Michigan Secretary of State election - Ruth Johnson (50.68%) defeated Jocelyn Benson (45.22%).
- 2010 Michigan House of Representatives election - Republicans flipped 20 seats and took control of the House.
- 2010 Michigan Senate election - Republicans retained control of the Senate.

- November 4 - The NCAA placed Michigan football on probation for three years after finding major violations under head coach Rich Rodriguez.
- November 6 - Michigan defeated Illinois, 67–65, in triple overtime. It was the highest-scoring game in the history of the Big Ten Conference and the most points ever allowed by a Michigan football team.
- November 8 - Incoming Gov. Rick Snyder, crossing party lines, appointed Democrat Andy Dillon as state treasurer.
- November 16 - The Chevrolet Volt selected as Motor Trend's Car of the Year.
- November 21 - Lawyers for the family of Tamara Greene filed a 131-page brief offering evidence that a second stripper confirmed the party at the Manoogian Mansion and saw Kwame Kilpatrick's wife, Carlita, attack Greene.
- November 24–26 - The Skelton brothers, Tanner (age 5), Alexander (age 7), and Andrew (age 9), disappeared while staying with their father in Morenci for Thanksgiving weekend. The father, John Skelton, told police he gave the boys to an acquaintance, Joann Taylor, so they would not be home when he committed suicide. Police later determined that there was no Joann Taylor. He then changged his story and said he gave the boys to an unidentified organization to protect them from their mother. He was arrested for kidnapping on November 30, and pleaded no contest in July 2011 to unlawful imprisonment, with the proviso that murder charges could be brought later if the boys' bodies were found. The boys were never found, but a Lenawee County court declared them dead in March 2025. In November 2025, with his 15-year prison sentence set to expire, John Skelton was charged with murder.
- November 29 - Mark Dantonio named Big Ten Coach of the Year.

=== December ===
- December 8 - Detroit Mayor Dave Bing announced his intention to use incentives to concentrate the city's residents into several core areas in a newly configured city. Those who remained living outside the designated population centers would not get required services. City Council President Charles Pugh rejected Bing's plan, arguing the city could not turn off the lights and stop police patrols to areas outslde Bing's designated population centers.
- December 10 - The Detroit Institute of Arts auctioned off a U.S. flag that accompanied George Armstrong Custer at the Battle of Little Big Horn. The winning bid was for $1.9 million. The Detroit museum had acquire the flag in 1895 for $54.
- December 11 - The Big Chill at the Big House: Michigan vs. Michigan State at Michigan Stadium, set a record for hockey attendance.
- December 15 - A federal grand jury indicted Kwame Kilpatrick, his father, and three others on 38 counts in an 89-page charging document. U.S. Attorney Barbara McQuade said Kilpatrick had turned city hall into "the hub of a criminal enterprise that extorted millions from contractors."

== Deaths ==
- January 8 - Art Clokey, pioneer in stop-motion clay animation (creator of Gumby), at age 88
- January 11 - Robben Wright Fleming, President of University of Michigan (1968–1979), at age 93
- January 15 - Marshall Warren Nirenberg, biochemist, geneticist, and Nobel Prize winner, at age 82
- February 3 - Dick McGuire, Detroit Pistons head coach (1959–63), at age 84
- February 5 - Clarke Scholes, swimmer and Olympic gold medalist in 1952, at age 79
- February 13 - Red Rocha, Detroit Pistons coach (1957–60), at age 86
- February 14 - Doug Fieger, guitarist and lead vocalist of The Knack, at age 57
- March 14 - Altie Taylor, Detroit Lions running back (1969–1975), at age 62
- March 18 - Jerry York, former Chrysler and IBM executive, at age 71
- March 31 - Jerald terHorst, White House Press Secretary, quit in protest over Gerald Ford's pardon of Richard Nixon, at age 87
- April 11 - Mel Ravitz, Detroit city council (1961–1973, 1981–1997) and advocate for poor
- April 15 Benjamin Hooks, civil rights leader, Baptist minister, and executive director of the NAACP, at age 85
- May 4 - Ernie Harwell, Detroit Tigers radio announcer (1960–2002), at age 92
- May 6 - Robin Roberts, MLB pitcher and Michigan State athlete, at age 82
- May 11 - Doris Eaton Travis, dancer and actress, at age 106
- May 16 - Hank Jones, jazz pianist, bandleader, composer, at age 91
- May 30 - Ali-Ollie Woodson, R&B singer, spent 12 years with The Temptations, at age 58
- June 4 - Mack Supronowicz, Michigan basketball (1947–1950), at age 83
- June 9 - Bobby Kromm, Detroit Red Wings coach (1977–1980), at age 82
- June 19 - Marvin L. Esch, US Congressman (1967–1977), at age 82
- July 5 - Bob Probert, Detroit Red Wings left wing and enforcer (1985–1994), at age 45
- July 6 - Harvey Fuqua, singer, songwriter, producer, and Motown executive, at age 80
- July 21 - Ralph Houk, Tigers manager (1974–1978), at age 90
- August 14 - Abbey Lincoln, jazz singer and civil rights activist, at age 80
- September 11 - Ron Kramer, Michigan football end, All-American (1955 and 1956), at age 75
- September 22 - Don Doll, Detroit Lions safety (1949–52), NFL record four interceptions in a game, at age 84
- October 23 - Ralph Belknap Baldwin, planetary scientist specializing in lunar craters, at age 98
- October 23 - Vince Banonis, center for University of Detroit football, All-American 1941, at age 89
- November 4 - Sparky Anderson, Detroit Tigers manager (1979–1995), at age 76
- November 20 - Rob Lytle, Michigan running back (1973–76), at age 56
- December 20 - Bill Yearby, Michigan defensive end, All-American (1964 and 1965), at age 66
- December 22 - Fred Foy, radio and television announcer and actor, best known for The Lone Ranger intro, at age 89
- December 26 - Geraldine Doyle, mistakenly promoted in the media as the possible real-life model for the World War II era "We Can Do It!" poster, at age 86
- December 28 - Bill Lajoie, general manager of Detroit Tigers (1984–1990), at age 76
- December 29 - Steve Boros, UM baseball (1956–57) and Detroit Tigers (1957–62), at age 74

=== Gallery ===
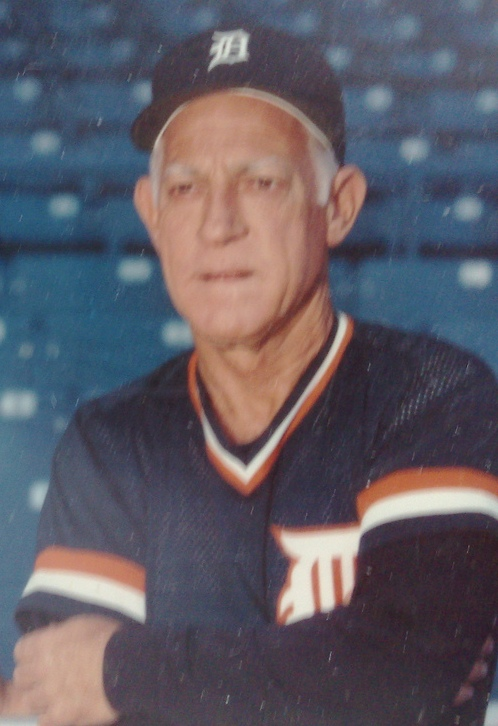
Sparky Anderson

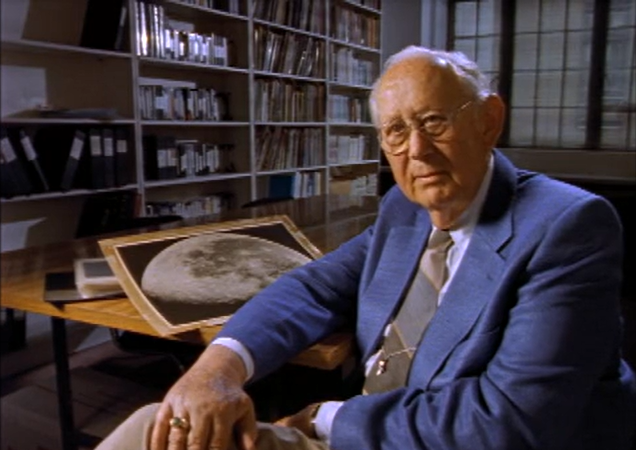
Ralph Belknap Baldwin

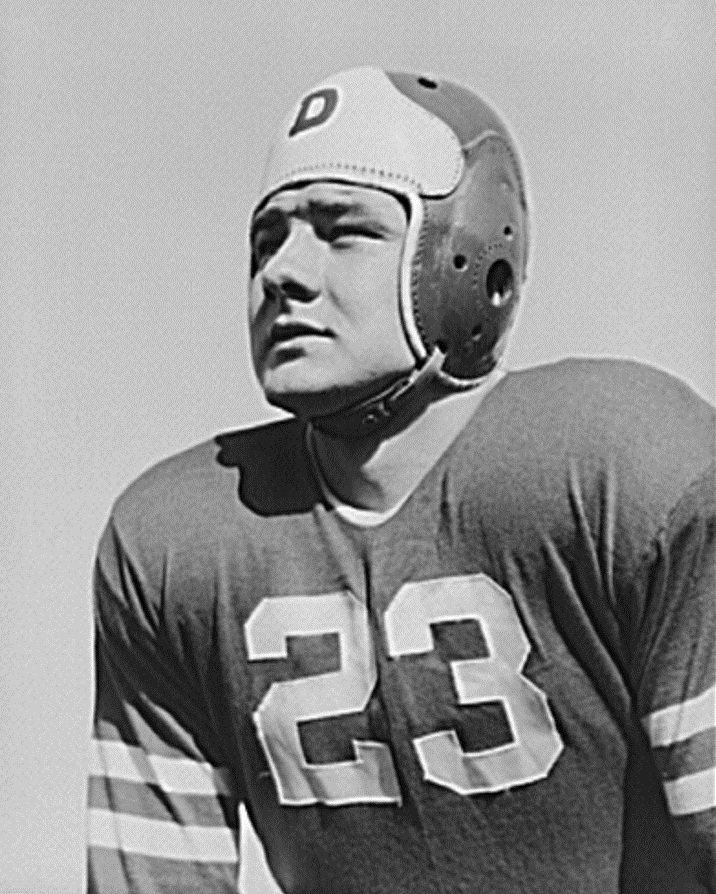
Vince Banonis

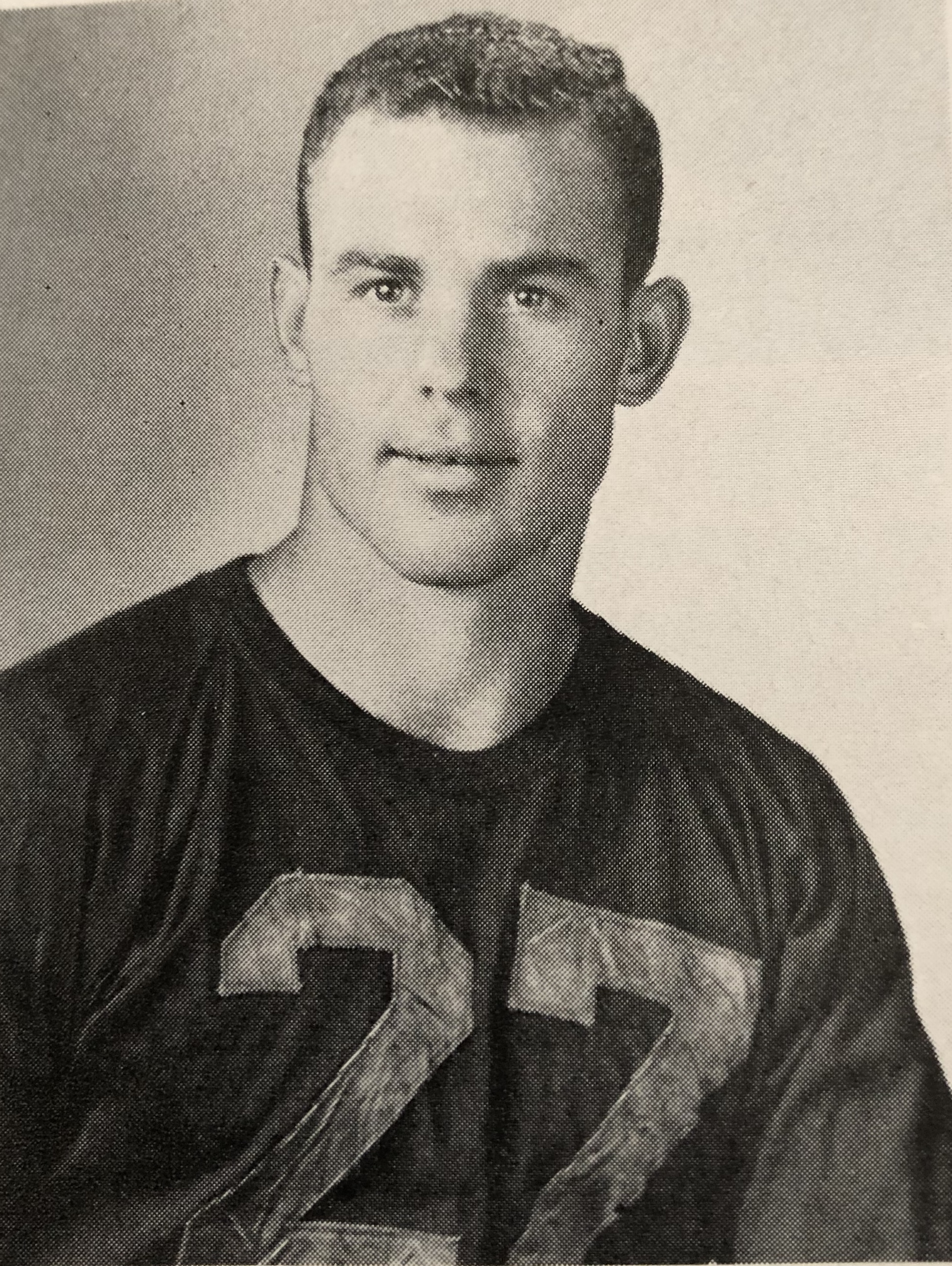
Don Doll

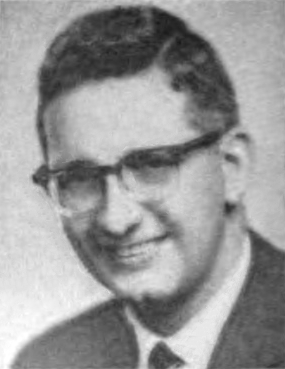
Marvin L. Esch

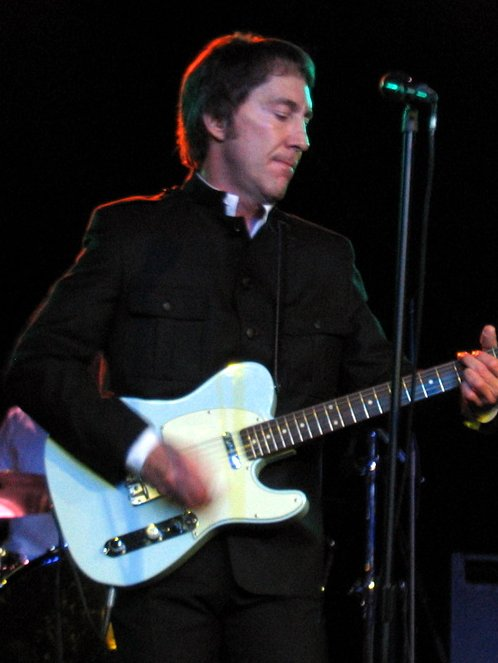
Doug Fieger

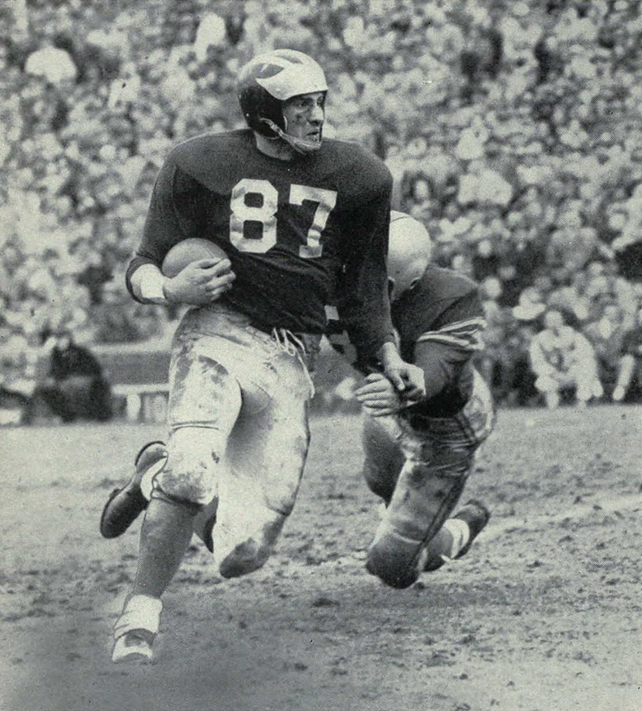
Ron Kramer

== See also ==
- History of Michigan
- History of Detroit
