= Dilbit =

Diluted bitumen (asphalt)

Dilbit (diluted bitumen) is a bitumen diluted with one or more lighter petroleum products, typically natural-gas condensates such as naphtha. Diluting bitumen makes it much easier to transport, for example in pipelines. Per the Alberta Oil Sands Bitumen Valuation Methodology, "Dilbit Blends" means "Blends made from heavy crudes and/or bitumens and a diluent, usually natural-gas condensate, for the purpose of meeting pipeline viscosity and density specifications, where the density of the diluent included in the blend is less than 800 kg/m^{3}." If the diluent density is greater than or equal to 800 kg/m^{3}, the diluent is typically synthetic crude and accordingly the blend is called synbit.

== Reasons for dilution ==
Bitumen and heavy oils are often produced from remote deposits such as the Athabasca oil sands in Alberta, Canada and the Orinoco tar sands in Venezuela. Before 1980, most produced bitumen was transported by truck, but trucking is seasonally restricted and relatively inefficient and expensive compared to pipeline transport. However, bitumen in its undiluted state is too viscous and dense to be transported by pipeline. To create a fluid capable of transportation by pipeline, bitumen must be mixed with a fluid that has much lower viscosity and will keep bitumen from precipitating out of the mixture. By 1985, Alberta Energy Company was operating dual pipelines to transport diluent from Edmonton to the Cold Lake oil sands and dilbit from Cold Lake to Edmonton. Dilbit is now also transported by rail.

== Methods of dilution ==
The most common diluent used to dilute bitumen is natural gas condensate (NGC), especially the naphtha component. Due to insufficient quantity of natural gas condensate in Alberta, bitumen shippers also use refined naptha and synthetic crude oil (SCO) as diluent, and import a considerable amount from the U.S. Although SCO requires a higher volume percentage to achieve the same viscosity, at least one study found that SCO provides better blend stability than NGC. Shippers dilute bitumen before shipment in order to meet viscosity and density requirements found in common carrier pipeline tariff rules. A National Energy Board study assumed a standard dilbit containing 33% condensate (resulting in product with "21.5 °API and sulphur content of 3.3 percent") and synbit containing 50% SCO. By selecting different diluent types and blend ratios, bitumen shippers attempt to lower component costs, increase blend value, and maintain pipeline transportability. The blend ratio may consist of 25 to 55% diluent by volume, depending on characteristics of the bitumen and diluent, pipeline specifications, operating conditions, and refinery requirements.

Froth treatment which removes heavy constituents rather than adding lighter ones is another method.

== Refinement process ==
Diluent can be removed from dilbit by distillation and reused. Alternatively, the entire dilbit can be refined. Dilbit and synbit are typically processed by refineries as heavy or medium crudes, respectively. Since dilbit contains hydrocarbons at extreme ends of the viscosity range, it can be more difficult to process than typical crude oil.

== Risks and failures ==
=== Enbridge pipeline dilbit spill ===
The Kalamazoo River oil spill was a major spill from a ruptured Enbridge dilbit pipeline in 2010. Cleanup took five years. The EPA ordered Enbridge to dredge the heavy bitumen out of hundreds of acres of Talmadge Creek and the Kalamazoo River.

=== Separation and oil spill risks ===
Unlike conventional crude, unstabilized dilbit floats briefly in water but heavier components sink as light components evaporate. The remaining bitumen can make cleaning up a dilbit spill more difficult than a conventional oil spill, particularly if dredging is considered too ecologically damaging. During the 2010 Kalamazoo River oil spill, the heavier components combined with silt and sank to the bottom of the water column, making cleanup difficult. Cleanup of the spill was still underway three years after the event, and officials at the Michigan Department of Natural Resources' Fishery Division stated that it will "be many more years before the agency can measure the full impact on fish and other animals' reproductive cycles." However, studies show that dilbit does not increase the risk of corrosion occurring within a pipeline or otherwise increase the risk of a release occurring.

In 2013, opening on the Keystone XL pipeline proposal, the EPA recommended to the State Department that pipelines that carry dilbit (such as the proposed Keystone XL) should no longer be treated just like pipelines that carry any other oil. "We have learned from the 2010 Enbridge spill of oil sands crude in Michigan that spills of diluted bitumen (dilbit) may require different response actions or equipment from response actions for conventional oil spills. These spills can also have different impacts than spills of conventional oil. ... We recommend that the Final EIS more clearly acknowledge that in the event of a spill to water, it is possible that large portions of dilbit will sink and that submerged oil significantly changes spill response and impacts. We also recommend that the Final EIS include means to address the additional risks of releases that may be greater for spills of dilbit than other crudes. For example, in the Enbridge spill, the local health department issued voluntary evacuation notices based on the level of benzene measured in the air."

=== Oil spills in aquatic ecosystems ===
Pipelines are a major source of dilbit transportation and of revenue in Canada and the United States. The effects of dilbit spills on freshwater ecosystems is an active area of research, and much remains unknown.

In coastal marine ecosystems, such as those found in British Columbia, Canada, dilbit floats on the surface because it is too light to sink, unless it is significantly weathered. Weathering breaks down the lighter components. Dilbit is harmful to a wide range of marine animals, including sea otters, baleen whales, fish embryos, and juvenile salmon.

The effects of dilbit on freshwater ecosystems have come into focus in the late 2010s, particularly by researchers at the Experimental Lakes Area and Queen's University, both in Ontario, Canada. Environmental factors such as temperature and light change dilbit's physical properties, so whole-lake ecosystem experiments are crucial in understanding the potential effects of dilbit leaks and spills. Oil spills were simulated in limnocorrals, which are effectively giant test tubes in a lake. The results of these studies show greater than 70% reduction in most phytoplankton and zooplankton in response to oil spills, although nano- and microphytoplankton populations recovered as the oil sank to the bottom of the lake. Total insect emergence also decreased with increasing dilbit concentration, and the oil likely drove water strider immobility and death.

== Alternatives to diluent ==
- Heated pipelines
- Constructing upgraders closer to production

== See also ==
- Canadian Centre for Energy Information
- History of the petroleum industry in Canada (oil sands and heavy oil)
- Syncrude
- Suncor
- CNRL
- Kalamazoo River oil spill
