= Elias Abuelazam =

Arab-Israeli murder convict (born 1976)

- Mugshot for misdemeanor assault, Arlington, Virginia
- Born: Elias Abuelazam; August 29, 1976 (age 50); Ramla, Israel
- Other name: Elias Abullazam
- Height: 6 ft 5 in (196 cm)
- Conviction: First degree murder
- Penalty: Life imprisonment

Details
- Victims: 2 (confirmed); Suspected in 17 further attacks, resulting in another 4 deaths
- Span of crimes: March 2009 – August 2010
- Country: U.S.
- States: Michigan, Ohio, and Virginia
- Date apprehended: August 11, 2010

Elias Abuelazam (/əˌbʊələˈzæm/; Arabic: الياس أبو العظام; Hebrew: אליאס אבו אל עזאם; born August 29, 1976), also known as Elias Abullazam, is an Arab-Israeli convicted murderer, and a suspect of serial killings and stabbings with a racial motive. He is suspected in a string of eighteen stabbing attacks from May to August 2010 which resulted in five deaths. Most of the alleged attacks occurred in Genesee County, Michigan (particularly in and around Flint). Five stabbings occurred elsewhere: three in Leesburg, Virginia, one in Toledo, Ohio, and one in his native home in Ramla, Israel. All of his alleged victims were described as "small-framed" (i.e., short, thin, non-muscular) men — most of them African Americans.

During the investigation, Michigan media dubbed Abuelazam the "Flint Serial Slasher" and the "Flint Serial Stabber". He was 6 feet 5 inches (1.96 m) and weighed 280 pounds (130 kg) at the time of his booking. Abuelazam has been convicted in one of the murders, that of 49-year-old Arnold Minor, which occurred on August 2, 2010, in Flint. He is currently serving a sentence of life imprisonment without the possibility of parole for that crime. As a result, Genesee County prosecutors have announced Abuelazam will not stand trial for the other crimes in their jurisdiction, nor will authorities in Toledo or Leesburg try him. On May 2, 2017, Abuelazam confessed to a 2009 murder in Leesburg.

== Personal life ==
Abuelazam was born in Israel, to a well-to-do Arab Christian family. As a child, he moved to the United States with his family after his mother remarried; he acquired a Green Card but never gained US citizenship. According to the State Department, Abuelazam changed the spelling of his last name to Abullazam in March 1995.

Until 2008, Abuelazam worked at Piedmont Behavioral Health Center, LLC, an adolescent psychiatric facility in Leesburg, Virginia (now called North Spring Behavioral Healthcare) as a mental health technician. After moving to Michigan, he worked as a clerk at Kingwater Market in Beecher from July 5 to August 1, 2010. Most customers knew him as "Eli." He was cited for giving alcohol to a minor July 29, the same day a 59-year-old man was stabbed in Flint. Abuelazam's legal address is in Bradenton, Florida, according to the warrant. He previously lived in Grand Blanc, according to state records. Abuelazam most recently lived in a house belonging to his uncle on Maryland Avenue, on Flint's east side.

Abuelazam married Jessica Hirth (also known as Jessica Nimitz and Jessica Abuelazam) on July 30, 2004. He reportedly subjected her to emotional abuse. After they divorced in 2007, Abuelazam married again. Jessica and her parents later expressed shock after he was accused of the murders and stabbings.

== Crimes ==
Police and prosecutors claim that between May and August 2010, Abuelazam would drive around late at night, approach small-framed men who were walking alone, ask for directions or help fixing his vehicle, a green-colored Chevrolet TrailBlazer, and then stab them, usually in the chest or stomach. Abuelazam's alleged victims have been mostly black, and police in Leesburg suspect the attacks may have been racially motivated. Genesee County prosecutors, however, have declined to speculate on his motive, while noting the population of Flint is mostly black.

Abuelazam is also suspected of having stabbed a friend in the face with a screwdriver while on a visit to his family in Ramla in early 2010. Police did not pursue the case because the friend refused to press charges.

In 2017, Abuelazam confessed to the unsolved 2009 murder of his Leesburg neighbor, Jammie Lane. Under an agreement, Abuelazam admitted to the crime in exchange for prosecutors granting him immunity to any charges in the case.

== Investigation ==
In Genesee County on August 4, 2010, it was announced that a series of stabbings dating back to May 2010 were the work of one man, and a multi-jurisdictional task force was set up to investigate. The next week on August 9, 2010, police in Leesburg connected three hammer attacks against black men there via their victims' descriptions of the suspect, video surveillance footage of the attacks that matches his description and vehicle, and the similar mode of operation. The next day Toledo Police claimed a stabbing of a black man there also matched the suspect.

== Arrests ==
=== First arrest ===
Abuelazam was arrested August 5, 2010, in Arlington, Virginia, during a traffic stop. He was taken into custody because he had a warrant out for his arrest for simple assault and later released on personal bond.

=== Second arrest and extradition ===
Abuelazam was arrested by U.S. Customs and Border Protection officers on August 11, 2010, at 10:00 p.m. in Hartsfield–Jackson Atlanta International Airport, while preparing to board a Delta Air Lines flight bound for Tel Aviv. On August 13, 2010, he waived his right to fight extradition to Michigan. Abuelazam's family hired Lansing based attorneys Brian Morley and Edwar Zeineh. He was flown to Flint on August 26, 2010, and lodged in the Genesee County Jail.

Abuelazam was held in solitary confinement, likely for his safety and because he had "scarred a lot of lives" with his actions, according to Genesee County Sheriff Robert Pickell. At his arraignment, he was ordered held without bond by the judge, even after the prosecutor asked for $10 million bail.

== Arnold Minor murder trial ==
During the evidentiary hearing for the Arnold Minor murder case, the judge ruled that evidence of the other Genesee County attacks could be used in the trial. The trial began on May 8, 2012. The prosecution's key piece of evidence was a drop of Minor's blood on a pair of pants found in Abuelazam's luggage. On May 15 the prosecution rested after calling 50 witnesses, including other victims and their relatives, as well as several forensic experts, in addition to Abuelazam's uncle, who assisted police in his capture.

Two days later on May 17, Abuelazam's attorneys presented an insanity defense. Their sole expert witness was a psychiatrist hired by his attorneys who diagnosed him with paranoid schizophrenia and said Abuelazam told him he committed the crimes because of "evil spirits". The doctor also said Abuelazam told him he attempted suicide in 1997 and was diagnosed as psychotic by an Israeli psychologist in 2009. The prosecution responded by attacking the psychiatrist's credibility, noting that his field of expertise was addiction medicine. The next day, the prosecution refuted the psychiatrist's diagnosis with two of their own mental health experts.

Two psychologists who testified on behalf of the prosecution agreed that although Abuelazam has an unspecified personality disorder and he lacked empathy, his attacks were too planned out and organized for him to be considered legally insane. On May 22, 2012, after only an hour of deliberation, the jury found Abuelazam guilty of Minor's murder. On June 25, 2012, Abuelazam was sentenced to life imprisonment without the possibility of parole.

== Dismissed charges ==
On August 26, 2010, the Genesee County Prosecutor's Office charged him with one count of assault with intent to commit murder for an attack on July 27, 2010. On September 20, 2010, he was charged with four additional counts of assault to commit murder. The victims in those crimes are: Bill Fisher, who was attacked June 26, 2010; Richard Booker, who was attacked July 19, 2010 in Genesee Township, Michigan; Etwan Wilson, who was attacked August 1, 2010 near Pierson Road in northern Flint; and Da'Von Rawls of Flint.

On October 8, 2010, an Ohio grand jury indicted Abuelazam and charged him with felonious assault in the stabbing of church janitor Tony Leno in Toledo, Ohio.

On October 21, 2010, he was charged with murder in the stabbing deaths of Frank Kellybrew and Darwin Marshall of Flint, Michigan.

On November 4, 2010, he was charged with two counts of resisting and obstructing a police officer causing injury and three counts of resisting and obstructing a police officer after he attempted to punch a deputy and had to be tasered with the help of four other officers on October 27, 2010.

On November 12, 2010, he was charged with malicious destruction of property for smashing out the windows of a car belonging to James Augsberger, boyfriend of witness Lucinda Mann.

On November 23, 2010, he was charged with assault with intent to murder in the stabbing of Antoine Jackson on July 12, 2010, in Burton, Michigan.

== Appeals ==
Abuelazam hired a new attorney, Christopher M. Smith, who filed an appeal based on the original trial judge's rejection of a motion for a change of venue due to the extensive media coverage of the case which, they claimed, wrongly called him a serial killer, and refuted the judge's decision to allow evidence of the other attacks or testimony of his other alleged victims. On June 10, 2014, the Michigan Court of Appeals upheld Abuelazam's conviction. Smith then appealed that decision to the Michigan Supreme Court, which declined to hear it on November 25, 2014.

== Deportation lawsuit ==
On August 1, 2014, Abuelazam filed a case in federal court against the Immigration and Naturalization Service and the United States Attorney General asking to be deported to Israel to face charges of an attempted murder that happened in Latrun on October 1, 2009. Michigan authorities believed the lawsuit to be frivolous and expected it to be dismissed, noting that it is legally impossible because of Abuelazam's life without parole status, since convicts cannot be deported until their full sentence is served.

== In popular culture ==
The Abuelezam case was profiled on a July 8, 2013 episode of the Investigation Discovery show Blood, Lies & Alibis titled "Serial Slasher". It featured re-enactments of some of his attacks, the investigation and his arrest, actual footage of some of his attacks and his arrest and trial, as well as testimony by Genesee County law enforcement officials, local media, surviving victims, and Arnold Minor's relatives.

== See also ==
- List of homicides in Michigan
- List of serial killers in the United States
