= Talmadge Creek =

River in the United States of America

Physical characteristics
- Source
  - location: Marshall, Michigan
  - coordinates: 42.2317°N 84.94692°W
- Mouth
  - location: Kalamazoo River, Michigan
  - coordinates: 42.25726°N 84.99525°W

Talmadge Creek is a tributary of the Kalamazoo River. It is located in Calhoun County, Michigan, near the county seat of Marshall.

== 2010 crude oil spill ==
The creek is notable as the site of a major oil spill that made its way into the Kalamazoo River. On 26 July 2010, an estimated 843,444 US gal (3,192,780 L) of crude oil-like dilbit leaked into the creek from a 30-inch pipeline operated by the Enbridge Pipeline System. The pipeline intersects the creek 0.5 miles east of Interstate 69 and approximately two miles south of Marshall. The leak location was a wetland located less than 2 miles upstream from the Kalamazoo River, ensuring that the spilled hydrocarbons would soon enter the larger waterway, despite efforts to use booms to prevent the dilbit from reaching the river. In July 2016, Enbridge and the state of Michigan announced a legal settlement totaling $177 million for costs related to the spill.
