= March 2010 in sports =

<<	March 2010					>>
Su	Mo	Tu	We	Th	Fr	Sa
	1	2	3	4	5	6
7	8	9	10	11	12	13
14	15	16	17	18	19	20
21	22	23	24	25	26	27
28	29	30	31
Sports

This list shows notable sports-related deaths, events, and notable outcomes that occurred in March of 2010.

== Deaths in March ==
- 11: Merlin Olsen
- 25: Chet Simmons

== Sporting seasons ==
=== Australian rules football 2010 ===
- Australian Football League

=== Auto racing 2010 ===
- Formula One
- Sprint Cup
- IRL IndyCar Series
- World Rally Championship
- Nationwide Series
- Camping World Truck Series
- WTTC
- V8 Supercar
- American Le Mans
- Rolex Sports Car Series
- Super GT

=== Basketball 2010 ===
- NBA
- NCAA Division I men
- NCAA Division I women
- Euroleague
- EuroLeague Women
- Eurocup
- EuroChallenge
- Australia
- France
- Germany
- Greece
- Iran
- Israel
- Italy
- Philippines
  - Fiesta Conference
- Spain
- Turkey

=== Cricket 2009–2010 ===
- Australia:
  - Sheffield Shield
  - Ford Ranger Cup
- Bangladesh:
  - National League
- India:
  - Ranji Trophy
  - Premier League
- New Zealand:
  - Plunket Shield
- Pakistan:
  - Quaid-i-Azam Trophy
- South Africa:
  - SuperSport Series
- Sri Lanka:
  - Premier Trophy
- Zimbabwe:
  - Logan Cup

=== Darts ===
- Premier League

=== Football (soccer) 2010 ===
National teams competitions

- 2011 FIFA Women's World Cup qualification (UEFA)
- 2011 UEFA European Under-21 Championship qualification

International clubs competitions

- UEFA (Europe) Champions League
- Europa League
- UEFA Women's Champions League
- Copa Libertadores (South America)
- AFC (Asia) Champions League
- AFC Cup
- CAF (Africa) Champions League
- CAF Confederation Cup
- CONCACAF (North & Central America) Champions League
- OFC (Oceania) Champions League

Domestic (national) competitions

- Argentina
- Australia
- England
- France
- Germany
- Iran
- Italy
- Japan
- Norway
- Russia
- Scotland
- Spain
- Major League Soccer (USA & Canada)

=== Golf 2010 ===
- PGA Tour
- European Tour
- LPGA Tour
- Champions Tour

=== Ice hockey 2010 ===
- National Hockey League

=== Motorcycle racing 2010 ===
- Superbike World championship

=== Rugby union 2010 ===
- 2011 Rugby World Cup qualifying
- Heineken Cup
- European Challenge Cup
- English Premiership
- Celtic League
- Top 14
- Super 14
- Sevens World Series

== Days of the month ==
=== March 31, 2010 (Wednesday) ===
==== Basketball ====
- ULEB Eurocup Quarterfinals, second leg: (first leg score in parentheses)
  - **ALBA Berlin** (Germany) 72–59 (61–67) (Israel) Hapoel Jerusalem. ALBA Berlin win 133–126 on aggregate.
  - **Power Elec Valencia** (Spain) 85–67 (71–64) (Greece) Aris BSA 2003. Valencia win 156–131 on aggregate.
  - **Bizkaia Bilbao Basket** (Spain) 46–52 (59–47) (Czech Republic) ČEZ Nymburk. Bilbao win 105–99 on aggregate.
  - Gran Canaria 2014 (Spain) 75–68 (70–81) (Greece) **Panellinios BC**. Panellinios win 149–145 on aggregate.
- College Basketball Invitational Final, Game 2 in St. Louis:
  - **Virginia Commonwealth** 71, Saint Louis 65. Virginia Commonwealth wins series 2–0.
- WNIT Semifinal in Ann Arbor, Michigan:
  - Miami (FL) 76, Michigan 59
- McDonald's All-American Boys Game in Columbus, Ohio:
  - West 107, East 104
- McDonald's All-American Girls Game in Columbus, Ohio:
  - West 84, East 75

==== Cricket ====
- Australia in New Zealand:
  - 2nd Test in Hamilton, Day 5:
    - Australia 231 (74.3 overs) and 511/8d (153 overs); New Zealand 264 (63.3 overs) and 302 (91.1 overs). **Australia win by 176 runs, win 2–match series 2–0.**

==== Football (soccer) ====
- 2011 FIFA Women's World Cup qualification (UEFA):
  - Group 1:
    - Croatia 0–3 Iceland
    - Northern Ireland 0–4 France
    - Serbia 4–0 Estonia
      - Standings: France 18 points (6 matches), Iceland 15 (6), Serbia 4 (5), Northern Ireland, Estonia 3 (4), Croatia 1 (5).
  - Group 4:
    - Hungary 2–0 Bosnia and Herzegovina
    - Romania 1–4 Poland
      - Standings: Poland 12 points (5 matches), Hungary 11 (5), Romania 7 (5), Ukraine 4 (3), Bosnia and Herzegovina 0 (6).
  - Group 6: Republic of Ireland 1–2 Switzerland
    - Standings: Russia 12 points (4 matches), Switzerland 12 (5), Ireland 9 (6), Israel 3 (5), Kazakhstan 0 (4).
  - Group 7:
    - Italy 1–1 Finland
    - Portugal 7–0 Armenia
      - Standings: Italy 16 points (6 matches), Finland 13 (5), Portugal, Slovenia 6 (5), Armenia 0 (7).
  - Group 8: Wales 0–4 Sweden
    - Standings: Sweden 12 points (4 matches), Belgium 7 (6), Czech Republic 6 (4), Wales 6 (6), Azerbaijan 4 (4).
- UEFA Champions League quarter-finals, first leg:
  - Arsenal (England) 2–2 (Spain) Barcelona
  - Internazionale (Italy) 1–0 (Russia) CSKA Moscow
- Copa Libertadores: (teams in **bold** advance to the round of 16, teams in ~~strike~~ are eliminated)
  - Group 2: Monterrey (Mexico) 0–0 (Brazil) São Paulo
    - Standings: São Paulo 10 points (5 matches), Once Caldas 8 (4), Monterrey 6 (5), ~~Nacional~~ 0 (4).
  - Group 5: Internacional (Brazil) 2–0 (Uruguay) Cerro
    - Standings: Internacional 8 points (4 matches), Cerro 7 (4), Deportivo Quito 4 (3), Emelec 0 (3).
  - Group 6: Morelia (Mexico) 1–1 (Argentina) Banfield
    - Standings: Nacional 8 points (4 matches), Banfield 8 (5), Morelia 5 (5), Deportivo Cuenca 3 (4).
  - Group 7: Cruzeiro (Brazil) 3–0 (Argentina) Vélez Sársfield
    - Standings: Cruzeiro 10 points (5 matches), Vélez Sársfield 10 (5), Colo-Colo 4 (4), ~~Deportivo Italia~~ 1 (4).
- AFC Champions League group stage, Round 4: (teams in **bold** advance to the round of 16, teams in ~~strike~~ are eliminated)
  - Group A:
    - Al-Gharafa (Qatar) 1–1 (Iran) Esteghlal
    - ~~Al-Jazira~~ (United Arab Emirates) 0–2 (Saudi Arabia) Al-Ahli
      - Standings (after 4 matches): Esteghlal 8 points, Al-Gharafa 7, Al-Ahli 6, Al-Jazira 1.
  - Group C:
    - Sepahan (Iran) 2–0 (Uzbekistan) Pakhtakor
    - Al-Shabab (Saudi Arabia) 3–2 (United Arab Emirates) Al-Ain
      - Standings (after 4 matches): Al-Shabab 7 points, Pakhtakor 6, Sepahan 5, Al-Ain 4.
  - Group E:
    - Beijing Guoan (China) 0–1 (South Korea) **Seongnam Ilhwa Chunma**
    - Melbourne Victory (Australia) 1–0 (Japan) Kawasaki Frontale
      - Standings (after 4 matches): Seongnam Ilhwa Chunma 12 points, Beijing Guoan 6, Kawasaki Frontale, Melbourne Victory 3.
  - Group G:
    - Gamba Osaka (Japan) 3–0 ~~Singapore Armed Forces~~
    - **Suwon Samsung Bluewings** (South Korea) 2–0 (China) Henan Construction
      - Standings (after 4 matches): Suwon Samsung Bluewings 10 points, Gamba Osaka 8, Henan Construction 2, Singapore Armed Forces 1.
- CONCACAF Champions League semifinals, first leg:
  - UNAM (Mexico) 1–0 (Mexico) Cruz Azul

=== March 30, 2010 (Tuesday) ===
==== Basketball ====
- Euroleague Quarterfinals, game 3:
  - Real Madrid (Spain) 73–84 (Spain) Regal FC Barcelona. Barça lead series 2–1.
  - Partizan Belgrade (Serbia) 81–73 (Israel) Maccabi Tel Aviv. Partizan Belgrade lead series 2–1.
  - Caja Laboral Baskonia (Spain) 66–53 (Russia) CSKA Moscow. CSKA Moscow lead series 2–1.
  - Asseco Prokom Gdynia (Poland) 81–78 (Greece) Olympiacos Piraeus. Olympiacos lead series 2–1.
- NCAA Division I Women's Tournament:
  - Regional Finals (seeds in parentheses):
    - Dayton Regional:
      - (1) Connecticut 90, (3) Florida State 50
    - Kansas City Regional:
      - (3) Oklahoma 88, (4) Kentucky 68
- NIT Semifinals in New York City:
  - Dayton 68, Mississippi 63
  - North Carolina 68, Rhode Island 67 (OT)
- CollegeInsider.com Tournament Final in Springfield, Missouri:
  - Missouri State 78, Pacific 65

==== Cricket ====
- Australia in New Zealand:
  - 2nd Test in Hamilton, Day 4:
    - Australia 231 (74.3 overs) and 511/8d (153 overs); New Zealand 264 (63.3 overs) and 185/5 (62 overs). New Zealand require another 294 runs with 5 wickets remaining.

==== Football (soccer) ====
- 2011 FIFA Women's World Cup qualification (UEFA):
  - Group 2: Belarus 0–5 Norway
    - Standings: Norway 12 points (4 matches), Netherlands 7 (4), Belarus 4 (3), Slovakia 3 (3), North Macedonia 0 (4)
- UEFA Champions League quarter-finals, first leg:
  - Lyon (France) 3–1 (France) Bordeaux
  - Bayern Munich (Germany) 2–1 (England) Manchester United
- Copa Libertadores: (teams in **bold** advance to the round of 16, teams in ~~strike~~ are eliminated)
  - Group 3: Juan Aurich (Peru) 0–2 (Argentina) Estudiantes
    - Standings: Estudiantes 10 points (5 matches), (Peru) Alianza Lima 9 (4), Juan Aurich 6 (5), (Bolivia) ~~Bolívar~~ 1 (4).
  - Group 4: Libertad (Paraguay) 1–1 (Argentina) Lanús
    - Standings: Libertad 9 points (5 matches), (Peru) Universitario 8 (4), Lanús 7 (5), (Bolivia) ~~Blooming~~ 0 (4).
- AFC Champions League group stage, Round 4: (teams in **bold** advance to the round of 16, teams in ~~strike~~ are eliminated)
  - Group B:
    - Bunyodkor (Uzbekistan) 0–1 (Iran) Zob Ahan
    - Al-Ittihad (Saudi Arabia) 4–0 (United Arab Emirates) ~~Al-Wahda~~
      - Standings (after 4 matches): Zob Ahan 10 points, Al-Ittihad 7, Bunyodkor 6, Al-Wahda 0.
  - Group D:
    - Mes Kerman (Iran) 3–1 (Qatar) Al-Sadd
    - Al-Ahli (United Arab Emirates) 2–3 (Saudi Arabia) Al-Hilal
      - Standings (after 4 matches): Al-Hilal 10 points, Al-Sadd, Mes Kerman 6, Al-Ahli 1.
  - Group F:
    - ~~Persipura Jayapura~~ (Indonesia) 1–3 (Japan) **Kashima Antlers**
    - **Jeonbuk Hyundai Motors** (South Korea) 1–0 (China) ~~Changchun Yatai~~
      - Standings (after 4 matches): Kashima Antlers 12 points, Jeonbuk Hyundai Motors 9, Changchun Yatai 3, Persipura Jayapura 0.
  - Group H:
    - Sanfrecce Hiroshima (Japan) 1–0 (Australia) Adelaide United
    - Shandong Luneng (China) 1–2 (South Korea) Pohang Steelers
      - Standings (after 4 matches): Adelaide United, Pohang Steelers 9 points, Shandong Luneng, Sanfrecce Hiroshima 3.
- CONCACAF Champions League semifinals, first leg:
  - Toluca (Mexico) 1–1 (Mexico) Pachuca

=== March 29, 2010 (Monday) ===
==== Auto racing ====
- NASCAR Sprint Cup Series:
  - Goody's Fast Pain Relief 500 in Ridgeway, Virginia:
    - (1) (Virginia) Denny Hamlin (Toyota, Joe Gibbs Racing) (2) (Connecticut) Joey Logano (Toyota, Joe Gibbs Racing) (3) (California) Jeff Gordon (Chevrolet, Hendrick Motorsports)
      - Driver standings (after 6 of 36 rounds): (1) (California) Jimmie Johnson (Chevrolet, Hendrick Motorsports) 898 points (2) (Washington (state)) Greg Biffle (Ford, Roush Fenway Racing) 884 (3) (Wisconsin) Matt Kenseth (Ford, Roush Fenway Racing) 882.
- IndyCar Series:
  - Honda Grand Prix of St. Petersburg in St. Petersburg, Florida:
    - (1) Will Power (AUS) (Team Penske) 2:07:05.7968 (2) Justin Wilson (GBR) (Dreyer & Reinbold Racing) +0.8244 (3) Ryan Briscoe (AUS) (Team Penske) +4.7290
      - Driver standings (after 2 of 17 rounds): (1) Power 103 points (2) Ryan Hunter-Reay (USA) (Andretti Autosport), Wilson & Dario Franchitti (GBR) (Chip Ganassi Racing) 59.

==== Basketball ====
- NCAA Division I Women's Tournament:
  - Regional Finals (seeds in parentheses):
    - Memphis Regional:
      - (4) Baylor 51, (2) Duke 48
    - Sacramento Regional:
      - (1) Stanford 55, (3) Xavier 53
- College Basketball Invitational Final, Game 1 in Richmond, Virginia:
  - Virginia Commonwealth 68, Saint Louis 56. Virginia Commonwealth leads series 1–0.

==== Cricket ====
- Australia in New Zealand:
  - 2nd Test in Hamilton, Day 3:
    - Australia 231 (74.3 overs) and 333/4 (114 overs; Simon Katich 106); New Zealand 264 (63.3 overs). Australia lead by 300 runs with 6 wickets remaining.

==== Golf ====
- PGA Tour:
  - Arnold Palmer Invitational in Orlando, Florida:
    - Winner: Ernie Els (RSA) 277 (−11)
      - Els wins for the second time at Bay Hill; his second PGA Tour title of the season, and his eighteenth in total.

=== March 28, 2010 (Sunday) ===
==== Athletics ====
- World Cross Country Championships in Bydgoszcz, Poland:
  - Senior men: (gold) Joseph Ebuya (KEN) 33:00 (silver) Teklemariam Medhin (ERI) 33:06 (bronze) Moses Ndiema Kipsiro (UGA) 33:10
  - Senior women: (gold) Emily Chebet (KEN) 24:19 (silver) Linet Masai (KEN) 24:20 (bronze) Meselech Melkamu (ETH) 24:26
  - Junior men: (gold) Caleb Mwangangi Ndiku (KEN) 22:07 (silver) Clement Kiprono Langat (KEN) 22:09 (bronze) Japhet Kipyegon Korir (KEN) 22:12
  - Junior women: (gold) Mercy Cherono (KEN) 18:47 (silver) Purity Cherotich Rionoripo (KEN) 18:54 (bronze) Esther Chemtai (KEN) 18:55

==== Auto racing ====
- Formula One:
  - Australian Grand Prix in Melbourne, Australia:
    - (1) Jenson Button (GBR) (McLaren–Mercedes) 1:33:36.531 (2) Robert Kubica (POL) (Renault) +12.034 (3) Felipe Massa (BRA) (Ferrari) +14.488
      - Drivers' Championship standings (after 2 of 19 rounds): (1) Fernando Alonso (ESP) (Ferrari) 37 points (2) Massa 33 (3) Button 31
      - Constructors' Championship standings: (1) Ferrari 70 (2) McLaren-Mercedes 54 (3) Mercedes 29
- NASCAR Sprint Cup Series:
  - Goody's Fast Pain Relief 500 in Ridgeway, Virginia: Postponed to March 29 due to rain.
- IndyCar Series:
  - Honda Grand Prix of St. Petersburg in St. Petersburg, Florida: Postponed to March 29 due to rain.
- V8 Supercars:
  - BRC IMPCO V8 Supercars GP Challenge in Melbourne, Australia:
    - Race 3: (1) Garth Tander (AUS) (Holden Commodore) (2) Shane van Gisbergen (NZL) (Ford Falcon) (3) Will Davison (AUS) (Holden Commodore)

==== Basketball ====
- NCAA Division I Men's Tournament:
  - Regional Finals (seeds in parentheses):
    - Midwest Regional in St. Louis:
      - (5) Michigan State 70, (6) Tennessee 69
    - South Regional in Houston:
      - (1) Duke 78, (3) Baylor 71
- NCAA Division I Women's Tournament:
  - Regional semifinals (seeds in parentheses):
    - Dayton Regional:
      - (1) Connecticut 74, (4) Iowa State 36
      - (3) Florida State 74, (7) Mississippi State 71
    - Kansas City Regional:
      - (3) Oklahoma 77, (2) Notre Dame 72 (OT)
      - (4) Kentucky 76, (1) Nebraska 67
- Women's Basketball Invitational Final in Boone, North Carolina:
  - Appalachian State 79, Memphis 71

==== Biathlon ====
- World Championships in Khanty-Mansiysk, Russia:
  - Mixed relay: (gold) Germany (Simone Hauswald, Magdalena Neuner, Simon Schempp, Arnd Peiffer) 1:18:17.4 (0 penalty loops + 6 extra bullets) (silver) Norway (Ann Kristin Flatland, Tora Berger, Emil Hegle Svendsen, Ole Einar Bjørndalen) 1:19:41.4 (0 + 6) (bronze) Sweden (Helena Jonsson, Anna Carin Olofsson-Zidek, Björn Ferry, Carl Johan Bergman) 1:19:48.2 (0 + 11)

==== Cricket ====
- Australia in New Zealand:
  - 2nd Test in Hamilton, Day 2:
    - Australia 231 (74.3 overs) and 35/0 (14 overs); New Zealand 264 (63.3 overs; Ross Taylor 138). Australia lead by 2 runs with 10 wickets remaining.

==== Curling ====
- World Women's Championship in Swift Current, Canada:
  - Bronze Medal Game: (bronze) Canada 9–6 Sweden
  - Gold Medal Game: (gold) Germany 8–6 (silver) Scotland
    - German skip Andrea Schöpp and second Monika Wagner win their second world title after a break of 22 years.

==== Cycling ====
- UCI ProTour:
  - Volta a Catalunya:
    - Stage 7: (gold) Juan José Haedo (ARG) (Team Saxo Bank) 2h 32' 21" (silver) Robert Förster (GER) (Team Milram) s.t. (bronze) Nicolas Roche (IRL) (Ag2r–La Mondiale) s.t.
      - Final General classification: (1) Joaquim Rodríguez (ESP) (Team Katusha) 25h 16' 03" (2) Xavier Tondó (ESP) (Cervélo TestTeam) + 10" (3) Rein Taaramäe (EST) (Cofidis) + 43"
  - Gent–Wevelgem: (gold) Bernhard Eisel (AUT) (Team HTC–Columbia) 5h 16' 21" (silver) Sep Vanmarcke (BEL) (Topsport Vlaanderen–Mercator) s.t. (bronze) Philippe Gilbert (BEL) (Omega Pharma–Lotto) s.t.
- Track World Championships in Ballerup, Denmark:
  - Women's Points Race: (gold) Tara Whitten (CAN) 36 points (silver) Lauren Ellis (NZL) 33 (bronze) Tatsiana Sharakova (BLR) 33
  - Men's Omnium: (gold) Edward Clancy (GBR) 24 points (silver) Leigh Howard (AUS) 32 (bronze) Taylor Phinney (USA) 33
  - Women's Keirin: (gold) Simona Krupeckaitė (LTU) (silver) Victoria Pendleton (GBR) (bronze) Olga Panarina (BLR)
  - Men's Sprint: (gold) Grégory Baugé (FRA) (silver) Shane Perkins (AUS) (bronze) Kévin Sireau (FRA)

==== Football (soccer) ====
- 2011 FIFA Women's World Cup qualification (UEFA):
  - Group 6: Kazakhstan 0–6 Russia
    - Standings: Russia 12 points (4 matches), Switzerland 9 (4), Republic of Ireland 9 (5), Israel 3 (5), Kazakhstan 0 (4).
  - Group 8: Belgium 2–3 Wales
    - Standings: Sweden 9 points (3 matches), Belgium 7 (6), Czech Republic 6 (4), Wales 6 (5), Azerbaijan 4 (4).
- OFC Champions League Group stage, Matchday 6: (teams in **bold** advance to the final)
  - Group A: Auckland City FC (New Zealand) 2–2 (New Zealand) **Waitakere United**
    - Final standings: Waitakere United, Auckland City FC 12 points, (New Caledonia) AS Magenta 6, (French Polynesia) AS Manu-Ura 1.

==== Golf ====
- PGA Tour:
  - Arnold Palmer Invitational in Orlando, Florida:
    - Play suspended due to rain; final round will resume on March 29.
- European Tour:
  - Open de Andalucia in Andalucia, Spain:
    - Winner: Louis Oosthuizen (RSA) 263 (−17)
      - Oosthuizen claims his first European Tour title.
- LPGA Tour:
  - Kia Classic Presented by J Golf in Carlsbad, California:
    - Winner: Hee Kyung Seo (KOR) 276 (−12)
      - Seo, who entered the tournament on a sponsor's exemption, collects her first LPGA title.
- Champions Tour:
  - Cap Cana Championship in Cap Cana, Dominican Republic:
    - Winner: Fred Couples (USA) 195 (−21)
      - Couples wins his third Champions Tour title in four career starts.

==== Motorcycle racing ====
- Superbike:
  - Portimão Superbike World Championship round in Portimão, Portugal:
    - Race 1: (1) Max Biaggi (ITA) (Aprilia RSV4 1000) (2) Leon Haslam (GBR) (Suzuki GSX-R1000) (3) Jonathan Rea (GBR) (Honda CBR1000RR)
    - Race 2: (1) Biaggi (2) Haslam (3) Cal Crutchlow (GBR) (Yamaha YZF-R1)
      - Riders' standings (after 2 of 13 rounds): (1) Haslam 85 points (2) Biaggi 69 (3) Carlos Checa (ESP) (Ducati 1098R) 60.
- Supersport:
  - Portimão Supersport World Championship round in Portimão, Portugal:
    - (1) Kenan Sofuoğlu (TUR) (Honda CBR600RR) (2) Joan Lascorz (ESP) (Kawasaki ZX-6R) (3) Michele Pirro (ITA) (Honda CBR600RR)
      - Riders' standings (after 2 of 13 rounds): (1) Sofuoğlu 41 points (2) Lascorz 40 (3) Eugene Laverty (IRL) (Honda CBR600RR) 30.

==== Rugby union ====
- IRB Sevens World Series:
  - Hong Kong Sevens in Hong Kong:
    - Cup Final: Samoa 24–21 New Zealand
      - Standings after 6 of 8 events: (1) Samoa 124 points (2) New Zealand 121 (3) Fiji 94

==== Short track speed skating ====
- World Team Championships in Bormio, Italy:
  - Ladies: (gold) South Korea 45 points (silver) Canada 35 (bronze) Italy 21
  - Men: (gold) South Korea 38 points (silver) Canada 36 (bronze) China 24

=== March 27, 2010 (Saturday) ===
==== Auto racing ====
- V8 Supercars:
  - BRC IMPCO V8 Supercars GP Challenge in Melbourne, Australia:
    - Race 2: (1) Garth Tander (AUS) (Holden Commodore) (2) Jamie Whincup (AUS) (Holden Commodore) (3) James Courtney (AUS) (Ford Falcon)

==== Basketball ====
- NCAA Division I Men's Tournament:
  - Regional Finals (seeds in parentheses):
    - West Regional in Salt Lake City:
      - (5) Butler 63, (2) Kansas State 56
        - The Bulldogs advance to the Final Four in their home town for the first time in their history.
    - East Regional in Syracuse, New York:
      - (2) West Virginia 73, (1) Kentucky 66
        - The Mountaineers reach the Final Four for the first time since 1959.
- NCAA Division I Women's Tournament:
  - Regional semifinals (seeds in parentheses):
    - Memphis Regional:
      - (4) Baylor 77, (1) Tennessee 62
      - (2) Duke 66, (11) San Diego State 58
    - Sacramento Regional:
      - (1) Stanford 73, (5) Georgia 36
      - (3) Xavier 74, (7) Gonzaga 56

==== Biathlon ====
- World Cup 9 in Khanty-Mansiysk, Russia:
  - Women's mass start: (gold) Magdalena Neuner (GER) 36:20.0 (3 penalty shots) (silver) Sandrine Bailly (FRA) 36:37.2 (1) (bronze) Anastasiya Kuzmina (SVK) 36:43.6 (1)
    - Final Overall standings: (1) Neuner 933 points (2) Simone Hauswald (GER) 854 (3) Helena Jonsson (SWE) 813
    - Final Mass start standings: (1) Neuner 216 points (2) Hauswald 198 (3) Andrea Henkel (GER) 169
  - Men's mass start: (gold) Dominik Landertinger (AUT) 38:19.8 (1 penalty shot) (silver) Arnd Peiffer (GER) 38:23.4 (0) (bronze) Halvard Hanevold (NOR) 38:31.0 (0)
    - Final Overall standings: (1) Emil Hegle Svendsen (NOR) 828 points (2) Christoph Sumann (AUT) 813 (3) Ivan Tcherezov (RUS) 782
    - Final Mass start standings: (1) Evgeny Ustyugov (RUS) 197 points (2) Svendsen 163 (3) Peiffer 161

==== Cricket ====
- Australia in New Zealand:
  - 2nd Test in Hamilton, Day 1:
    - Australia 231 (74.3 overs); New Zealand 19/1 (13 overs)

==== Curling ====
- World Women's Championship in Swift Current, Canada:
  - Playoffs 3 vs. 4: Scotland 8–3 Sweden
  - Semifinal: Canada 4–10 Scotland

==== Cycling ====
- UCI ProTour:
  - Volta a Catalunya:
    - Stage 6: (gold) Samuel Dumoulin (FRA) (Cofidis) 4h 04' 45" (silver) Rein Taaramäe (EST) (Cofidis) s.t. (bronze) Joaquim Rodríguez (ESP) (Team Katusha) s.t.
      - General classification: (1) Rodríguez 22h 43' 42" (2) Xavier Tondó (ESP) (Cervélo TestTeam) + 10" (3) Taaramäe + 43"
- Track World Championships in Ballerup, Denmark:
  - Men's Madison: (gold) Australia (Leigh Howard, Cameron Meyer) 16 points (silver) France (Morgan Kneisky, Christophe Riblon) 6 (bronze) Belgium (Ingmar De Poortere, Steve Schets) 5
  - Women's Sprint: (gold) Victoria Pendleton (GBR) (silver) Guo Shuang (CHN) (bronze) Simona Krupeckaitė (LTU)
    - Pendleton wins the title for the fourth straight time and fifth time overall.
  - Women's Omnium: (gold) Tara Whitten (CAN) 23 points (silver) Elizabeth Armitstead (GBR) 29 (bronze) Leire Olaberria (ESP) 30

==== Figure skating ====
- World Championships in Turin, Italy:
  - Ladies: (gold) Mao Asada (JPN) 197.58 (silver) Kim Yuna (KOR) 190.79 (bronze) Laura Lepistö (FIN) 178.62
    - Asada wins the title for the second time.

==== Football (soccer) ====
- 2011 FIFA Women's World Cup qualification (UEFA):
  - Group 1:
    - Croatia 0–3 Estonia
    - France 6–0 Northern Ireland
    - Serbia 0–2 Iceland
      - Standings: France 15 points (5 matches), Iceland 12 (5), Northern Ireland, Estonia 3 (3), Serbia, Croatia 1 (4).
  - Group 2:
    - Netherlands 1–0 Slovakia
    - Norway 14–0 North Macedonia
      - Standings: Norway 9 points (3 matches), Netherlands 7 (4), Belarus 4 (2), Slovakia 3 (3), Macedonia 0 (4).
  - Group 3:
    - Georgia 1–3 Scotland
    - Denmark 9–0 Bulgaria
      - Standings: Denmark 10 points (4), Scotland 9 (3), Greece 6 (4), Bulgaria 4 (4), Georgia 0 (5).
  - Group 4: Bosnia and Herzegovina 0–5 Romania
    - Standings: Poland 9 points (4 matches), Hungary 8 (4), Romania 7 (4), Ukraine 4 (3), Bosnia and Herzegovina 0 (5).
  - Group 5: Malta 0–2 Turkey
    - Standings: Spain 12 points (4 matches), England 9 (3), Turkey 6 (4), Austria 3 (4), Malta 0 (5).
  - Group 6: Switzerland 6–0 Israel
    - Standings: Russia 9 points (3 matches), Switzerland 9 (4), Republic of Ireland 9 (5), Israel 3 (5), Kazakhstan 0 (3).
  - Group 7:
    - Portugal 1–3 Italy
    - Slovenia 1–0 Armenia
      - Standings: Italy 15 points (5 matches), Finland 12 (4), Slovenia 6 (5), Portugal 3 (4), Armenia 0 (6).
  - Group 8: Azerbaijan 0–5 Czech Republic
    - Standings: Sweden 9 points (3 matches), Belgium 7 (5), Czech Republic 6 (4), Azerbaijan 4 (4), Wales 3 (4).
- OFC Champions League Group stage, Matchday 6: (teams in **bold** advance to the final)
  - Group A:
    - AS Magenta (New Caledonia) 8–1 (French Polynesia) AS Manu-Ura
      - Standings: (New Zealand) Waitakere United, (New Zealand) Auckland City FC 11 points (5 matches), AS Magenta 6 (6), AS Manu-Ura 1 (6).
  - Group B:
    - Marist FC (Solomon Islands) 1–4 (Papua New Guinea) **PRK Hekari United**
    - Tafea FC (Vanuatu) 1–3 (Fiji) Lautoka F.C.
      - Final standings: PRK Hekari United 13 points, Lautoka F.C. 12, Tafea FC 8, Marist FC 1.
- (France) Coupe de la Ligue Final in Saint-Denis:
  - **Marseille** 3–1 Bordeaux
    - Marseille win the Cup for the first time, claiming their first trophy since the 1992–93 UEFA Champions League.

==== Horse racing ====
- Dubai World Cup in Dubai, United Arab Emirates: (gold) Gloria De Campeao (BRA) (trainer: Pascal Bary, jockey: Tiago Pereira) (silver) Lizard's Desire (SAF) (trainer: Mike de Kock, jockey: Kevin Shea) (bronze) Allybar (IRE) (trainer: Mahmood Al Zarooni, jockey: Ahmad Ajtebi)

==== Mixed martial arts ====
- UFC 111 in Newark, New Jersey:
  - Welterweight Championship bout: Georges St-Pierre (CAN) def. Dan Hardy (ENG) via unanimous decision (50–43, 50–44, 50–45) to retain the UFC Welterweight championship.
  - Interim Heavyweight Championship bout: Shane Carwin def. (USA) Frank Mir (USA) via KO (punches) at 3:48 of round 1 to become the UFC Interim Heavyweight champion.
  - Lightweight bout: Kurt Pellegrino (USA) def. Fabricio Camões (BRA) via submission (rear naked choke) at 4:20 of round 2.
  - Welterweight bout: Jon Fitch (USA) def. Ben Saunders (USA) via unanimous decision (30–27, 30–27, 30–27).
  - Lightweight bout: Jim Miller (USA) def. Mark Bocek (CAN) via unanimous decision (29–28, 29–28, 30–27).

==== Rugby union ====
- 2011 Rugby World Cup qualifying:
  - European Nations Cup First Division, matchday 6 (postponed from Feb 6):
    - Romania 48–3 Spain in Bucharest
      - Final standings: Georgia 27 points, Russia 25, Romania 23, Portugal 21, Spain 14, Germany 10.

=== March 26, 2010 (Friday) ===
==== Auto racing ====
- V8 Supercars:
  - BRC IMPCO V8 Supercars GP Challenge in Melbourne, Australia:
    - Race 1: (1) James Courtney (AUS) (Ford Falcon) (2) Garth Tander (AUS) (Holden Commodore) (3) Shane van Gisbergen (NZL) (Ford Falcon)

==== Basketball ====
- NCAA Division I Men's Tournament:
  - Regional semifinals (seeds in parentheses):
    - Midwest Regional in St. Louis:
      - (6) Tennessee 76, (2) Ohio State 73
      - (5) Michigan State 59, (9) Northern Iowa 52
    - South Regional in Houston:
      - (3) Baylor 72, (10) Saint Mary's 49
      - (1) Duke 70, (4) Purdue 57

==== Biathlon ====
- World Cup 9 in Khanty-Mansiysk, Russia:
  - Men's sprint: (gold) Ivan Tcherezov (RUS) 24:24.3 (0 penalty shots) (silver) Christian de Lorenzi (ITA) 24:38.1 (0) (bronze) Andriy Deryzemlya (UKR) 24:41.0 (1)
    - Overall standings after 24 of 25 events: (1) Emil Hegle Svendsen (NOR) 801 points (2) Christoph Sumann (AUT) 801 (3) Tcherezov 750
    - Final Sprint standings: (1) Svendsen 354 points (2) Tcherezov 344 (3) Sumann 292

==== Curling ====
- World Women's Championship in Swift Current, Canada:
  - Tie-breaker: Sweden 11–8 United States
  - Playoffs 1 vs. 2: Canada 3–6 Germany

==== Cycling ====
- UCI ProTour:
  - Volta a Catalunya:
    - Stage 5: (gold) Davide Malacarne (ITA) (Quick-Step) 4h 50' 03" (silver) Andreas Klöden (GER) (Team RadioShack) + 36" (bronze) Luis León Sánchez (ESP) (Caisse d'Epargne) + 37"
      - General classification: (1) Joaquim Rodríguez (ESP) (Team Katusha) 18h 38' 57" (2) Xavier Tondó (ESP) (Cervélo TestTeam) + 10" (3) Rein Taaramäe (EST) (Cofidis) + 46"
- Track World Championships in Ballerup, Denmark:
  - Men's 1 km Time Trial: (gold) Teun Mulder (NED) 1:00.341 (silver) Michaël D'Almeida (FRA) 1:00.884 (bronze) François Pervis (FRA) 1:01.024
  - Men's Team Pursuit: (gold) Australia (Jack Bobridge, Rohan Dennis, Michael Hepburn, Cameron Meyer) 3:55.654 (silver) (United Kingdom) Great Britain (Steven Burke, Edward Clancy, Ben Swift, Andrew Tennant) 3:55.806 (bronze) New Zealand (Sam Bewley, Westley Gough, Peter Latham, Jesse Sergent) 3:59.475
  - Women's Scratch: (gold) Pascale Jeuland (FRA) (silver) Yumari González Valdivieso (CUB) (bronze) Belinda Goss (AUS)

==== Figure skating ====
- World Championships in Turin, Italy:
  - Ladies – Short program: (1) Mirai Nagasu (USA) 70.40 (2) Mao Asada (JPN) 68.08 (3) Laura Lepistö (FIN) 64.30
  - Ice dancing: (gold) Tessa Virtue/Scott Moir (CAN) 224.43 (silver) Meryl Davis/Charlie White (USA) 223.03 (bronze) Federica Faiella/Massimo Scali (ITA) 197.85
    - Virtue and Moir are the second ice dance world champions from Canada after Shae-Lynn Bourne and Victor Kraatz in 2003.

=== March 25, 2010 (Thursday) ===
==== Basketball ====
- NCAA Division I Men's Tournament:
  - Regional semifinals (seeds in parentheses):
    - West Regional in Salt Lake City:
      - (5) Butler 63, (1) Syracuse 59
      - (2) Kansas State 101, (6) Xavier 96 (2 OT)
    - East Regional in Syracuse, New York:
      - (2) West Virginia 69, (11) Washington 56
      - (1) Kentucky 62, (12) Cornell 45
- Euroleague Quarterfinals, game 2:
  - Regal FC Barcelona (Spain) 63–70 (Spain) Real Madrid. Series tied 1–1.
  - Maccabi Tel Aviv (Israel) 98–78 (Serbia) Partizan Belgrade. Series tied 1–1.
  - CSKA Moscow (Russia) 83–63 (Spain) Caja Laboral Baskonia. CSKA lead series 2–0.
  - Olympiacos Piraeus (Greece) 90–73 (Poland) Asseco Prokom Gdynia. Olympiacos lead series 2–0.

==== Biathlon ====
- World Cup 9 in Khanty-Mansiysk, Russia:
  - Women's sprint: (gold) Yana Romanova (RUS) 20:59.3 (0 penalty shots) (silver) Marie-Laure Brunet (FRA) 21:10.2 (0) (bronze) Helena Jonsson (SWE) 21:14.8 (0)
    - Overall standings after 24 of 25 events: (1) Magdalena Neuner (GER) 873 points (2) Simone Hauswald (GER) 840 (3) Jonsson 792
    - Final Sprint standings: (1) Hauswald 345 points (2) Neuner 334 (3) Jonsson 332

==== Curling ====
- World Women's Championship in Swift Current, Canada: (teams in **bold** advance to the playoffs, teams in italics go to tiebreaker, teams in ~~strike~~ are eliminated from playoffs contention)
  - Draw 15:
    - United States 5–9 Sweden
    - ~~Latvia~~ 6–9 ~~Switzerland~~
    - ~~Russia~~ 4–7 **Canada**
    - ~~Japan~~ 6–5 ~~Norway~~
  - Draw 16:
    - Germany 4–2 ~~Latvia~~
    - ~~China~~ 5–9 United States
    - ~~Denmark~~ 8–7 ~~Japan~~
    - **Scotland** 5–9 ~~Russia~~
  - Draw 17:
    - Norway 7–9 Denmark
    - **Canada** 8–5 **Scotland**
    - Switzerland 2–8 **Germany**
    - Sweden 4–9 China
      - Final standings: Canada 10–1, Germany, Scotland 8–3, Sweden, USA 7–4, Denmark, China 6–5, Russia 5–6, Norway, Switzerland 3–8, Japan 2–9, Latvia 1–10.

==== Cycling ====
- UCI ProTour:
  - Volta a Catalunya:
    - Stage 4: (gold) Jens Voigt (GER) (Team Saxo Bank) 4h 43' 28" (silver) Rein Taaramäe (EST) (Cofidis) s.t. (bronze) Paul Voss (GER) (Team Milram) + 34"
      - General classification: (1) Joaquim Rodríguez (ESP) (Team Katusha) 13h 48' 14" (2) Xavier Tondó (ESP) (Cervélo TestTeam) + 10" (3) Taaramäe + 46"
- Track World Championships in Ballerup, Denmark:
  - Men's Scratch: (gold) Alex Rasmussen (DEN) (silver) Juan Esteban Arango (COL) (bronze) Kazuhiro Mori (JPN)
  - Women's Team Sprint: (gold) Australia (Anna Meares, Kaarle McCulloch) 32.923 (WR) (silver) China (Gong Jinjie, Lin Junhong) 33.192 (bronze) Lithuania (Simona Krupeckaitė, Gintare Gaivenytė) 33.109
  - Men's Individual Pursuit: (gold) Taylor Phinney (USA) 4:16.600 (silver) Jesse Sergent (NZL) 4:18.459 (bronze) Jack Bobridge (AUS) 4:18.066
  - Women's Team Pursuit: (gold) Australia (Ashlee Ankudinoff, Sarah Kent, Josephine Tomic) 3:21.748 (silver) (United Kingdom) Great Britain (Wendy Houvenaghel, Elizabeth Armitstead, Joanna Rowsell) 3:22.287 (bronze) New Zealand (Rushlee Buchanan, Lauren Ellis, Alison Shanks) 3:21.552 (WR)
  - Men's Keirin: (gold) Chris Hoy (GBR) (silver) Azizulhasni Awang (MYS) (bronze) Maximilian Levy (GER)

==== Darts ====
- Premier League round 7 in Birmingham, England:
  - Mervyn King (ENG) 6–8 Simon Whitlock (AUS)
  - James Wade (ENG) 8–5 Terry Jenkins (ENG)
  - Raymond van Barneveld (NED) 4–8 Ronnie Baxter (ENG)
  - Adrian Lewis (ENG) 4–8 Phil Taylor (ENG)
    - High Checkout: Ronnie Baxter 164
      - Standings after 7 matches: Taylor 13 points, King, Baxter 8, Whitlock 7, Wade 6, Lewis, van Barneveld 5, Jenkins 4.

==== Figure skating ====
- World Championships in Turin, Italy:
  - Ice dancing:
    - Standings after Original dance: (1) Tessa Virtue/Scott Moir (CAN) 114.40 (2) Meryl Davis/Charlie White (USA) 112.54 (3) Federica Faiella/Massimo Scali (ITA) 100.01
  - Men: (gold) Daisuke Takahashi (JPN) 257.70 (silver) Patrick Chan (CAN) 247.22 (bronze) Brian Joubert (FRA) 241.74
    - Takahashi becomes the first Japanese winner of the men's event.

==== Football (soccer) ====
- 2011 FIFA Women's World Cup qualification (UEFA):
  - Group 5: England 3–0 Austria
    - Standings: Spain 12 points (4 matches), England 9 (3), Austria 3 (4), Turkey 0 (2), Malta 0 (3).
- Copa Libertadores:
  - Group 1: Racing (Uruguay) 1–0 (Colombia) Independiente Medellín
    - Standings: (Brazil) Corinthians 7 points (3 matches), Racing 7 (4), Independiente Medellín 3 (4), (Paraguay) Cerro Porteño 1 (3).
  - Group 5: Deportivo Quito (Ecuador) 1–0 (Ecuador) Emelec
    - Standings (after 3 matches): (Uruguay) Cerro 7 points, (Brazil) Internacional 5, Deportivo Quito 4, Emelec 0.
  - Group 7: Vélez Sársfield (Argentina) 2–1 (Chile) Colo-Colo
    - Standings (after 4 matches): Vélez Sársfield 10 points, (Brazil) Cruzeiro 7, Colo-Colo 4, (Venezuela) Deportivo Italia 1.

==== Snooker ====
- Championship League in Essex, England:
  - Final: Marco Fu def. Mark Allen 3–2
    - Fu qualifies for the 2010 Premier League Snooker.

=== March 24, 2010 (Wednesday) ===
==== Basketball ====
- ULEB Eurocup Quarterfinals, first leg:
  - Hapoel Jerusalem (Israel) 67–61 (Germany) ALBA Berlin
  - Aris BSA 2003 (Greece) 64–71 (Spain) Power Elec Valencia
  - Panellinios BC (Greece) 81–70 (Spain) Gran Canaria 2014

==== Cricket ====
- England in Bangladesh:
  - 2nd Test in Mirpur, Day 5:
    - Bangladesh 419 (117.1 overs) and 285 (102 overs); England 496 (173.3 overs) and 209/1 (44 overs; Alastair Cook 109*). **England win by 9 wickets; win 2–match series 2–0.**

==== Curling ====
- World Women's Championship in Swift Current, Canada: (teams in **bold** advance to the playoffs, teams in ~~strike~~ are eliminated from playoffs contention)
  - Draw 12:
    - ~~Japan~~ 2–10 Canada
    - Russia 3–4 Norway
    - ~~Latvia~~ 4–7 Sweden
    - United States 9–7 Switzerland
  - Draw 13:
    - ~~Switzerland~~ 7–9 Scotland
    - Sweden 10–9 Denmark
    - ~~Norway~~ 7–8 China
    - Canada 7–8 Germany
  - Draw 14:
    - China 9–7 Russia
    - Germany 7–5 ~~Japan~~
    - **Scotland** 7–4 United States
    - Denmark 13–1 ~~Latvia~~
      - Standings after Draw 14: **Canada**, Scotland 8–1, USA, Germany, Sweden 6–3, China 5–4, Russia, Denmark 4–5, Norway 3–6, Switzerland 2–7, Japan, Latvia 1–8.

==== Cycling ====
- UCI ProTour:
  - Volta a Catalunya:
    - Stage 3: (gold) Xavier Tondó (ESP) (Cervélo TestTeam) 4h 43' 23" (silver) Joaquim Rodríguez (ESP) (Team Katusha) s.t. (bronze) Luis León Sánchez (ESP) (Caisse d'Epargne) + 48"
      - General classification: (1) Rodríguez 9h 04' 12" (2) Tondó + 10" (3) Sánchez + 48"
- Track World Championships in Ballerup, Denmark:
  - Women's 500 m Time Trial: (gold) Anna Meares (AUS) 33.381 (silver) Simona Krupeckaitė (LTU) 33.462 (bronze) Olga Panarina (BLR) 33.779
  - Men's Points Race: (gold) Cameron Meyer (AUS) 70 (silver) Peter Schep (NED) 33 (bronze) Milan Kadlec (CZE) 27
  - Women's Individual Pursuit: (gold) Sarah Hammer (USA) 3:28.601 (silver) Wendy Houvenaghel (GBR) 3:32.496 (bronze) Vilija Sereikaitė (LTU) 3:32.085
  - Men's Team Sprint: (gold) Germany (Robert Förstemann, Maximilian Levy, Stefan Nimke) 43.433 (silver) France (Grégory Baugé, Michaël D'Almeida, Kévin Sireau) 43.453 (bronze) (United Kingdom) Great Britain (Ross Edgar, Chris Hoy, Jason Kenny) 43.590

==== Figure skating ====
- World Championships in Turin, Italy:
  - Men – Short program: (1) Daisuke Takahashi (JPN) 89.30 (2) Patrick Chan (CAN) 87.80 (3) Brian Joubert (FRA) 87.70
  - Pairs: (gold) Pang Qing/Tong Jian (CHN) 211.39 (silver) Aliona Savchenko/Robin Szolkowy (GER) 204.74 (bronze) Yuko Kavaguti/Alexander Smirnov (RUS) 203.79
    - Pang and Tong win the title for the second time after a break of four years.

==== Football (soccer) ====
- Copa Libertadores:
  - Group 4: Lanús (Argentina) 1–0 (Bolivia) Blooming
    - Standings (after 4 matches): (Paraguay) Libertad, (Peru) Universitario 8 points, Lanús 6, ~~Blooming~~ 0.
  - Group 7: Cruzeiro (Brazil) 2–0 (Venezuela) Deportivo Italia
    - Standings: Cruzeiro 7 points (4 matches), (Argentina) Vélez Sársfield 7 (3), (Chile) Colo-Colo 4 (3), ~~Deportivo Italia~~ 1 (4).
  - Group 8: Universidad Católica 1–1 (Venezuela) Caracas
    - Standings: Universidad de Chile 7 points (3 matches), (Brazil) Flamengo 6 (3), Universidad Católica 3 (4), Caracas 2 (4).
- AFC Champions League group stage, Round 3:
  - Group B:
    - Zob Ahan (Iran) 3–0 (Uzbekistan) Bunyodkor
    - Al-Wahda (United Arab Emirates) 0–2 (Saudi Arabia) Al-Ittihad
      - Standings (after 3 matches): Zob Ahan 7 points, Bunyodkor 6, Al-Ittihad 4, Al-Wahda 0.
  - Group D:
    - Al-Sadd (Qatar) 4–1 (Iran) Mes Kerman
    - Al-Hilal (Saudi Arabia) 1–1 (United Arab Emirates) Al-Ahli
      - Standings (after 3 matches): Al-Hilal 7 points, Al-Sadd 6, Mes Kerman 3, Al-Ahli 1.
  - Group F:
    - Changchun Yatai (China) 1–2 (South Korea) Jeonbuk Hyundai Motors
    - Kashima Antlers (Japan) 5–0 (Indonesia) Persipura Jayapura
      - Standings (after 3 matches): Kashima Antlers 9 points, Jeonbuk Hyundai Motors 6, Changchun Yatai 3, Persipura Jayapura 0.
  - Group H:
    - Adelaide United (Australia) 3–2 (Japan) Sanfrecce Hiroshima
    - Pohang Steelers (South Korea) 1–0 (China) Shandong Luneng
      - Standings (after 3 matches): Adelaide United 9 points, Pohang Steelers 6, Shandong Luneng 3, Sanfrecce Hiroshima 0.
- AFC Cup group stage, Round 3:
  - Group B: Al-Hilal (Yemen) 1–2 (India) Churchill Brothers
    - Standings (after 2 matches): Churchill Brothers 4 points, Al-Kuwait 2, Al-Hilal 1.
  - Group D:
    - Kingfisher East Bengal (India) 2–3 (Kuwait) Al-Qadsia
    - Al-Ittihad (Syria) 4–2 (Lebanon) Al-Nejmeh
      - Standings (after 3 matches): Al-Ittihad 7 points, Al-Qadsia 5, Al-Nejmeh 4, Kingfisher East Bengal 0.
  - Group F:
    - Victory SC (Maldives) 2–1 (Malaysia) Selangor
    - Sriwijaya (Indonesia) 1–0 (Vietnam) Bình Dương
      - Standings (after 3 matches): Sriwijaya 7 points, Bình Dương, Victory SC 4, Selangor 1.
  - Group H:
    - SHB Ðà Nẵng (Vietnam) 3–0 (Hong Kong) NT Realty Wofoo Tai Po
    - Thai Port (Thailand) 2–2 (Singapore) Geylang United
      - Standings (after 3 matches): SHB Ðà Nẵng 9 points, Thai Port 4, Geylang United 2, NT Realty Wofoo Tai Po 1.

=== March 23, 2010 (Tuesday) ===
==== American football ====
- The NFL announces a change to its overtime rule for postseason play, effective next season. Under the new rule, the loser of the coin toss at the start of overtime will have an offensive possession if the winner of the toss scores a field goal on its first possession. (ESPN)

==== Basketball ====
- NCAA Division I Women's Tournament:
  - Second Round (seeds in parentheses):
    - Dayton Regional in Norfolk, Virginia:
      - (1) Connecticut 90, (8) Temple 36
    - Sacramento Regional in Cincinnati:
      - (3) Xavier 63, (6) Vanderbilt 62
    - Dayton Regional in Pittsburgh:
      - (7) Mississippi State 85, (2) Ohio State 67
    - Kansas City Regional in Notre Dame, Indiana:
      - (2) Notre Dame 84, (10) Vermont 66
    - Kansas City Regional in Minneapolis:
      - (1) Nebraska 83, (8) UCLA 70
    - Memphis Regional in Austin, Texas:
      - (11) San Diego State 64, (3) West Virginia 55
    - Dayton Regional in Ames, Iowa:
      - (4) Iowa State 60, (12) Green Bay 56
    - Kansas City Regional in Norman, Oklahoma:
      - (3) Oklahoma 60, (11) UALR 44
- Euroleague Quarterfinals, game 1:
  - Regal FC Barcelona (Spain) 68–61 (Spain) Real Madrid. Barça lead series 1–0.
  - Maccabi Tel Aviv (Israel) 77–85 (Serbia) Partizan Belgrade. Partizan lead series 1–0.
  - CSKA Moscow (Russia) 86–63 (Spain) Caja Laboral Baskonia. CSKA lead series 1–0.
  - Olympiacos Piraeus (Greece) 83–79 (Poland) Asseco Prokom Gdynia. Olympiacos lead series 1–0.
- ULEB Eurocup Quarterfinals, first leg:
  - ČEZ Nymburk (Czech Republic) 47–59 (Spain) Bizkaia Bilbao Basket

==== Cricket ====
- Australia in New Zealand:
  - 1st Test in Wellington, Day 5:
    - Australia 459/5d (131 overs) and 106/0 (23 overs); New Zealand 157 (59.1 overs) and 407 (134.5 overs; Brendon McCullum 104). **Australia win by 10 wickets; lead 2–match series 1–0.**
- England in Bangladesh:
  - 2nd Test in Mirpur, Day 4:
    - Bangladesh 419 (117.1 overs) and 172/6 (68 overs); England 496 (173.3 overs). Bangladesh lead by 95 runs with 4 wickets remaining.

==== Curling ====
- World Women's Championship in Swift Current, Canada:
  - Draw 9:
    - Sweden 2–9 Germany
    - Switzerland 5–6 China
    - Canada 9–6 Denmark
    - Norway 3–7 Scotland
  - Draw 10:
    - Denmark 5–6 United States
    - Scotland 10–1 Latvia
    - Germany 4–7 Russia
    - China 11–6 Japan
  - Draw 11:
    - Norway 11–2 Latvia
    - United States 4–6 Canada
    - Japan 4–7 Switzerland
    - Russia 3–10 Sweden
      - Standings after Draw 11: Canada 7–0, Scotland 6–1, United States 5–2, Russia, Germany, Sweden 4–3, Denmark, China 3–4, Norway, Switzerland 2–5, Japan, Latvia 1–6.

==== Cycling ====
- UCI ProTour:
  - Volta a Catalunya:
    - Stage 2: (gold) Mark Cavendish (GBR) (Team HTC–Columbia) 4h 15' 46" (silver) Juan José Haedo (ARG) (Team Saxo Bank) s.t. (bronze) Aitor Galdós (ESP) (Euskaltel–Euskadi) s.t.
      - General classification: (1) Paul Voss (GER) (Team Milram) 4h 20' 43" (2) Levi Leipheimer (USA) (Team RadioShack) + 1" (3) Andreas Klöden (GER) (Team RadioShack) + 2"

==== Figure skating ====
- World Championships in Turin, Italy:
  - Ice dance – Compulsory dance: (1) Tessa Virtue/Scott Moir (CAN) 44.13 (2) Meryl Davis/Charlie White (USA) 43.25 (3) Federica Faiella/Massimo Scali (ITA) 40.85
  - Pairs – Short program: (1) Pang Qing/Tong Jian (CHN) 75.28 (2) Yuko Kavaguti/Alexander Smirnov (RUS) 73.12 (3) Aliona Savchenko/Robin Szolkowy (GER) 69.52

==== Football (soccer) ====
- Copa Libertadores:
  - Group 3: Estudiantes (Argentina) 2–0 (Bolivia) Bolívar
    - Standings (after 4 matches): (Peru) Alianza Lima 9 points, Estudiantes 7, (Peru) Juan Aurich 6, ~~Bolívar~~ 1.
  - Group 4: Libertad (Paraguay) 1–1 (Peru) Universitario
    - Standings: Libertad, Universitario 8 points (4 matches), (Argentina) Lanús 3 (3), (Bolivia) Blooming 0 (3).
- AFC Champions League group stage, Round 3:
  - Group A:
    - Esteghlal (Iran) 3–0 (Qatar) Al-Gharafa
    - Al-Ahli (Saudi Arabia) 5–1 (United Arab Emirates) Al-Jazira
      - Standings (after 3 matches): Esteghlal 7 points, Al-Gharafa 6, Al-Ahli 3, Al-Jazira 1.
  - Group C:
    - Pakhtakor (Uzbekistan) 2–1 (Iran) Sepahan
    - Al-Ain (United Arab Emirates) 2–1 (Saudi Arabia) Al-Shabab
      - Standings (after 3 matches): Pakhtakor 6 points, Al-Ain, Al-Shabab 4, Sepahan 2.
  - Group E:
    - Seongnam Ilhwa Chunma (South Korea) 3–1 (China) Beijing Guoan
    - Kawasaki Frontale (Japan) 4–0 (Australia) Melbourne Victory
      - Standings (after 3 matches): Seongnam Ilhwa Chunma 9 points, Beijing Guoan 6, Kawasaki Frontale 3, Melbourne Victory 0.
  - Group G:
    - Singapore Armed Forces 2–4 (Japan) Gamba Osaka
    - Henan Construction (China) 0–2 (South Korea) Suwon Samsung Bluewings
      - Standings (after 3 matches): Suwon Samsung Bluewings 7 points, Gamba Osaka 5, Henan Construction 2, Singapore Armed Forces 1.
- AFC Cup group stage, Round 3:
  - Group A:
    - Al-Karamah (Syria) 2–0 (Yemen) Al-Ahli
    - Saham (Oman) 0–0 (Jordan) Shabab Al-Ordon
      - Standings (after 3 matches): Al-Karamah 7 points, Shabab Al-Ordon 5, Saham 4, Al-Ahli 0.
  - Group C:
    - Nasaf Qarshi (Uzbekistan) 1–2 (Kuwait) Kazma
    - Al-Ahed (Lebanon) 1–1 (Syria) Al-Jaish
      - Standings (after 3 matches): Kazma 9 points, Nasaf Qarshi 6, Al-Jaish, Al-Ahed 1.
  - Group E:
    - Al-Wihdat (Jordan) 2–0 (Oman) Al-Nahda
    - Al-Rayyan (Qatar) 0–2 (Bahrain) Al-Riffa
      - Standings (after 3 matches): Al-Riffa 9 points, Al-Rayyan 6, Al-Wihdat 3, Al-Nahda 0.
  - Group G:
    - Muangthong United (Thailand) 3–1 (Maldives) VB Sports Club
    - South China (Hong Kong) 6–3 (Indonesia) Persiwa Wamena
      - Standings: VB Sports Club 6 points (3 matches), South China 4 (3), Muangthong United 4 (2), Persiwa Wamena 0 (2).

=== March 22, 2010 (Monday) ===
==== Basketball ====
- NCAA Division I Women's Tournament:
  - Second Round (seeds in parentheses):
    - Memphis Regional in Knoxville, Tennessee:
      - (1) Tennessee 92, (8) Dayton 64
    - Memphis Regional in Durham, North Carolina:
      - (2) Duke 60, (7) LSU 52
    - Dayton Regional in Tallahassee, Florida:
      - (3) Florida State 66, (6) St. John's 65 (OT)
    - Kansas City Regional in Louisville, Kentucky:
      - (4) Kentucky 70, (5) Michigan State 52
    - Sacramento Regional in Stanford, California:
      - (1) Stanford 96, (8) Iowa 67
    - Sacramento Regional in Seattle:
      - (7) Gonzaga 72, (2) Texas A&M 71
    - Sacramento Regional in Tempe, Arizona:
      - (5) Georgia 74, (4) Oklahoma State 71 (OT)
    - Memphis Regional in Berkeley, California:
      - (4) Baylor 49, (5) Georgetown 33
        - Baylor's Brittney Griner blocks a tournament-record 14 shots—two more than the Hoyas make in the game.

==== Cricket ====
- Australia in New Zealand:
  - 1st Test in Wellington, Day 4:
    - Australia 459/5d (131 overs); New Zealand 157 (59.1 overs) and 369/6 (124 overs). New Zealand lead by 67 runs with 4 wickets remaining.
- England in Bangladesh:
  - 2nd Test in Mirpur, Day 3:
    - Bangladesh 419 (117.1 overs); England 440/8 (154 overs; Ian Bell 138).

==== Curling ====
- World Women's Championship in Swift Current, Canada:
  - Draw 6:
    - Scotland 11–2 Japan
    - Denmark 4–10 Russia
    - China 8–2 Latvia
    - Germany 8–12 United States
  - Draw 7:
    - Russia 6–7 Switzerland
    - Japan 5–8 Sweden
    - United States 8–7 Norway
    - Latvia 6–12 Canada
  - Draw 8:
    - Canada 10–9 China
    - Norway 4–10 Germany
    - Sweden 3–7 Scotland
    - Switzerland 3–8 Denmark
      - Standings after Draw 8: Canada 5–0, Scotland, United States 4–1, Russia, Sweden, Denmark, Germany 3–2, China, Japan, Norway, Switzerland, Latvia 1–4.

==== Cycling ====
- UCI ProTour:
  - Volta a Catalunya:
    - Stage 1 (ITT): (gold) Paul Voss (GER) (Team Milram) 4' 57" (silver) Levi Leipheimer (USA) (Team RadioShack) + 1" (bronze) Andreas Klöden (GER) (Team RadioShack) + 2"

=== March 21, 2010 (Sunday) ===
==== Auto racing ====
- NASCAR Sprint Cup Series:
  - Food City 500 in Bristol, Tennessee:
    - (1) (California) Jimmie Johnson (Chevrolet, Hendrick Motorsports) (2) (Indiana) Tony Stewart (Chevrolet, Stewart Haas Racing) (3) (Nevada) Kurt Busch (Dodge, Penske Racing)
      - Driver standings after 5 of 36 races: (1) (California) Kevin Harvick (Chevrolet, Richard Childress Racing) 774 points (2) (Wisconsin) Matt Kenseth (Ford, Roush Fenway Racing) 773 (3) Johnson 760.

==== Basketball ====
- NCAA Division I Men's Tournament:
  - Second Round (seeds in parentheses):
    - West Regional in Buffalo, New York:
      - (1) Syracuse 87, (8) Gonzaga 65
    - Midwest Regional in Milwaukee:
      - (2) Ohio State 75, (10) Georgia Tech 66
    - Midwest Regional in Spokane, Washington:
      - (5) Michigan State 85, (4) Maryland 83
    - East Regional in Buffalo, New York:
      - (2) West Virginia 68, (10) Missouri 59
    - East Regional in Jacksonville, Florida:
      - (12) Cornell 87, (4) Wisconsin 69
    - West Regional in Milwaukee:
      - (6) Xavier 71, (3) Pittsburgh 68
    - South Regional in Spokane, Washington:
      - (4) Purdue 63, (5) Texas A&M 61 (OT)
    - South Regional in Jacksonville, Florida:
      - (1) Duke 68, (8) California 53
- NCAA Division I Women's Tournament:
  - First round (seeds in parentheses):
    - Dayton Regional in Pittsburgh:
      - (2) Ohio State 93, (15) Saint Francis 59
      - (7) Mississippi State 68, (10) Middle Tennessee 64
    - Sacramento Regional in Cincinnati:
      - (6) Vanderbilt 83, (11) DePaul 76 (OT)
      - (3) Xavier 94, (14) East Tennessee State 82
    - Dayton Regional in Norfolk, Virginia:
      - (1) Connecticut 95, (16) Southern 39
      - (8) Temple 65, (9) James Madison 53
    - Kansas City Regional in Notre Dame, Indiana:
      - (10) Vermont 64, (7) Wisconsin 55
      - (2) Notre Dame 86, (15) Cleveland State 58
    - Kansas City Regional in Minneapolis:
      - (1) Nebraska 83, (16) Northern Iowa 44
      - (8) UCLA 74, (9) North Carolina State 54
    - Memphis Regional in Austin, Texas:
      - (11) San Diego State 74, (6) Texas 63
      - (3) West Virginia 58 (14) Lamar 43
    - Kansas City Regional in Norman, Oklahoma:
      - (11) UALR 63, (6) Georgia Tech 53
      - (3) Oklahoma 68, (14) South Dakota State 57
    - Dayton Regional in Ames, Iowa:
      - (12) Green Bay 69, (5) Virginia 67
      - (4) Iowa State 79, (13) Lehigh 42

==== Biathlon ====
- World Cup 8 in Holmenkollen, Norway:
  - Women's mass start: (gold) Simone Hauswald (GER) 37:00.7 (2 penalty shots) (silver) Vita Semerenko (UKR) 37:15.4 (0) (bronze) Magdalena Neuner (GER) 37:22.9 (3)
    - Overall standings after 23 of 25 events: (1) Neuner 839 points (2) Hauswald 797 (3) Helena Jonsson (SWE) 744
    - Mass start standings after 5 of 6 events: (1) Hauswald 198 points (2) Andrea Henkel (GER) 169 (3) Jonsson 158
  - Men's mass start: (gold) Ivan Tcherezov (RUS) 40:10.1 (0 penalty shots) Christoph Sumann (AUT) 40:36.4 (3) (bronze) Emil Hegle Svendsen (NOR) 40:44.7 (2)
    - Overall standings after 23 of 25 events: (1) Svendsen 767 points (2) Sumann 758 (3) Evgeny Ustyugov (RUS) 715
    - Mass start standings after 5 of 6 events: (1) Ustyugov 197 points (2) Sumann 160 (3) Svendsen 154

==== Cricket ====
- Australia in New Zealand:
  - 1st Test in Wellington, Day 3:
    - Australia 459/5d (131 overs); New Zealand 157 (59.1 overs) and 187/5 (72 overs). Following on, New Zealand trail by 115 runs with 5 wickets remaining.
- England in Bangladesh:
  - 2nd Test in Mirpur, Day 2:
    - Bangladesh 419 (117.1 overs); England 171/3 (64 overs).

==== Cross-country skiing ====
- World Cup Final:
  - Stage 4 in Falun, Sweden:
    - Women's 10 km Freestyle Handicap: (gold) Marit Bjørgen (NOR) (silver) Justyna Kowalczyk (POL) (bronze) Charlotte Kalla (SWE)
    - Women's 25 km Mass Start: (gold) Bjørgen (silver) Kowalczyk (bronze) Kalla
      - Final Overall standings: (1) Kowalczyk 2064 points (2) Bjørgen 1320 (3) Petra Majdič (SLO) 1191
    - Men's 15 km Freestyle Handicap: (gold) Petter Northug (NOR) (silver) Maurice Manificat (FRA) (bronze) Marcus Hellner (SWE)
    - Men's 40 km Mass Start: (gold) Northug (silver) Manificat (bronze) Hellner
      - Final Overall standings: (1) Northug 1621 points (2) Lukáš Bauer (CZE) 1021 (3) Hellner 985

==== Curling ====
- World Women's Championship in Swift Current, Canada:
  - Draw 3:
    - Denmark 8–3 China
    - Scotland 6–9 Germany
  - Draw 4:
    - Sweden 9–5 Norway
    - United States 6–7 Latvia
    - Russia 7–6 Japan
    - Canada 6–4 Switzerland
  - Draw 5:
    - Germany 3–10 Denmark
    - Norway 3–8 Canada
    - Switzerland 6–7 Sweden
    - China 4–14 Scotland
      - Standings after Draw 5: Canada 3–0, United States, Germany, Denmark, Sweden, Scotland, Russia 2–1, Japan, Norway, Latvia 1–2, China, Switzerland 0–3.

==== Football (soccer) ====
- 2011 FIFA Women's World Cup qualification (UEFA):
  - Group 6: Israel 0–3 Republic of Ireland
    - Standings: Russia 9 points (3 matches), Republic of Ireland 9 (5), Switzerland 6 (3), Israel 3 (4), Kazakhstan 0 (3).
- CAF Champions League qualification First round, first leg:
  - Saint Eloi Lupopo (Democratic Republic of the Congo) 0–1 (Zimbabwe) Dynamos
  - Gazelle FC (Chad) 1–1 (Sudan) Al-Merreikh
  - Africa Sports (Ivory Coast) 0–0 (Sudan) Al-Hilal Omdurman
  - Union Douala (Cameroon) 0–2 (Algeria) ES Sétif
  - Djoliba (Mali) 1–0 (Senegal) ASC Linguère
  - Raja Casablanca (Morocco) 1–1 (Angola) Atlético Petróleos Luanda
- CAF Confederation Cup First round, first leg:
  - Banks (Ethiopia) 1–1 (Egypt) Haras El Hodood
  - Panthère de Ndé (Cameroon) 1–1 (Democratic Republic of the Congo) AS Vita Club
  - AC Léopard (Republic of the Congo) 3–1 (Cameroon) Cotonsport
  - Amal (Sudan) 4–2 (Mozambique) Costa do Sol
  - Petrojet (Egypt) 3–0 (Sudan) Khartoum
  - ASFAN (Niger) 1–0 (Tunisia) Étoile Sahel
  - Baraka (Guinea) 0–0 (Morocco) FUS Rabat
  - CAPS United (Zimbabwe) 1–1 (South Africa) Moroka Swallows
  - Warri Wolves (Nigeria) 3–0 (Zambia) ZESCO United
- (Scotland) Scottish League Cup Final in Glasgow:
  - St Mirren 0–1 **Rangers**
    - Rangers win the trophy for the 26th time, despite having two players sent off.

==== Golf ====
- PGA Tour:
  - Transitions Championship in Palm Harbor, Florida:
    - Winner: Jim Furyk (USA) 271 (−13)
      - Furyk wins his 14th PGA Tour title.
- European Tour:
  - Hassan II Golf Trophy in Rabat, Morocco:
    - Winner: Rhys Davies (WAL) 266 (−25)
      - Davies wins his first European Tour title.

==== Rugby union ====
- IRB Sevens World Series:
  - Australia Sevens in Adelaide:
    - Cup: Samoa 38–10 United States
      - The USA advance to a Cup final for the first time ever.
    - Plate: New Zealand 21–14 South Africa
    - Bowl: England 33–12 Kenya
    - Shield: Tonga 19–22 Japan
      - Standings after 5 of 8 events: (1) New Zealand 96 points (2) Samoa 94 (3) Fiji 74
- LV= Cup Final in Worcester, England:
  - Northampton Saints (England) 30–24 (England) Gloucester

==== Short track speed skating ====
- World Championships in Sofia, Bulgaria:
  - Ladies:
    - 1000 metres: (gold) Wang Meng (CHN) 1:31.603 (silver) Cho Ha-ri (KOR) +0.092 (bronze) Katherine Reutter (USA) +0.144
    - 3000 metres: (gold) Park Seung-hi (KOR) 5:04.070 (silver) Cho +0.118 (bronze) Lee Eun-byul (KOR) +0.192
    - Final standings: (gold) Park 73 points (silver) Wang 68 (bronze) Cho 55.
    - Relay: (gold) South Korea (Cho, Park, Lee, Kim Min-jung) 4:08.356 (silver) Canada (Marianne St-Gelais, Jessica Gregg, Kalyna Roberge, Tania Vicent) +0.954 (bronze) United States (Reutter, Alyson Dudek, Kimberly Derrick, Lana Gehring) +5.875
  - Men:
    - 1000 metres: (gold) Lee Ho-suk (KOR) 1:34.198 (silver) Kwak Yoon-gy (KOR) +0.033 (bronze) J. R. Celski (USA) +0.092
    - 3000 metres: (gold) Lee (silver) Kwak (bronze) Celski
    - Final standings: (gold) Lee 86 points (silver) Kwak 76 (bronze) Liang Wenhao (CHN) 47.
    - Relay: (gold) South Korea (Lee Ho-suk, Kwak, Lee Jung-su, Kim Seoung-il) 6:44.821 (silver) United States (Celski, Jordan Malone, Travis Jayner, Simon Cho) +2.510 (bronze) Germany (Paul Herrmann, Tyson Heung, Sebastian Praus, Robert Seifert) +3.467

==== Ski jumping ====
- Ski-Flying World Championships in Planica, Slovenia:
  - HS 215 Team: (gold) Austria (Gregor Schlierenzauer, Martin Koch, Thomas Morgenstern, Wolfgang Loitzl) 1641.4 points (silver) Norway (Bjørn Einar Romøren, Johan Remen Evensen, Anders Bardal, Anders Jacobsen) 1542.3 (bronze) Finland (Harri Olli, Matti Hautamäki, Olli Muotka, Janne Happonen) 1474.3

==== Snowboarding ====
- World Cup in La Molina, Spain:
  - Men's parallel giant slalom: (gold) Jasey Jay Anderson (CAN) (silver) Matthew Morison (CAN) (bronze) Andreas Prommegger (AUT)
    - Final standings: (1) Benjamin Karl (AUT) 7050 points (2) Prommegger 5410 (3) Anderson 5250
  - Women's parallel giant slalom: (gold) Ekaterina Tudegesheva (RUS) (silver) Doris Guenther (AUT) (bronze) Ina Meschik (AUT)
    - Final standings: (1) Nicolien Sauerbreij (NED) 5200 points (2) Guenther 5110 (3) Fraenzi Maegert-Kohli (SUI) 4090

==== Speed skating ====
- World Allround Championships in Heerenveen, Netherlands:
  - Women: (gold) Martina Sáblíková (CZE) 161.022 (silver) Kristina Groves (CAN) 161.512 (bronze) Ireen Wüst (NED) 162.106
    - Sáblíková wins the title for the second straight time.
  - Men: (gold) Sven Kramer (NED) 148.921 (silver) Jonathan Kuck (USA) 149.558 (bronze) Håvard Bøkko (NOR) 150.227
    - Kramer wins the title for the fourth straight time.

==== Tennis ====
- ATP World Tour:
  - BNP Paribas Open in Indian Wells, United States:
    - Final: **Ivan Ljubičić** (SRB) def. Andy Roddick (USA) 7–6(3), 7–6(5)
      - Ljubičić wins his 10th career title and his first Masters 1000 title.
- WTA Tour:
  - BNP Paribas Open in Indian Wells, United States:
    - Final: **Jelena Janković** (SRB) def. Caroline Wozniacki (DEN) 6–2, 6–4
      - Janković wins her 12th career title.

=== March 20, 2010 (Saturday) ===
==== Auto racing ====
- American Le Mans Series:
  - 12 Hours of Sebring in Sebring, Florida:
    - (1) (France) #07 Team Peugeot Total (Anthony Davidson (GBR), Marc Gené (ESP), Alexander Wurz (AUT)) (2) (France) #08 Team Peugeot Total (Sébastien Bourdais (FRA), Pedro Lamy (POR), Nicolas Minassian (FRA)) (3) (United Kingdom) #007 Aston Martin Racing (Adrian Fernández (MEX), Stefan Mücke (GER), Harold Primat (SUI))
- Nationwide Series:
  - Scotts Turf Builder 300 in Bristol, Tennessee:
    - (1) (Illinois) Justin Allgaier (Dodge, Penske Racing) (2) (Michigan) Brad Keselowski (Dodge, Penske Racing) (3) (Nevada) Kyle Busch (Toyota, Joe Gibbs Racing)
      - Driver standings (after 4 of 35 races): (1) (Missouri) Carl Edwards (Ford, Roush Fenway Racing) 670 points (2) Keselowski 644 (3) Allgaier 639

==== Basketball ====
- NCAA Division I Men's Tournament:
  - Second Round (seeds in parentheses):
    - South Regional in Providence, Rhode Island:
      - (10) Saint Mary's 75, (2) Villanova 68
    - West Regional in San Jose, California:
      - (5) Butler 54, (13) Murray State 52
    - Midwest Regional in Providence, Rhode Island:
      - (6) Tennessee 83, (14) Ohio 68
    - Midwest Regional in Oklahoma City:
      - (9) Northern Iowa 69, (1) Kansas 67
    - East Regional in San Jose, California:
      - (11) Washington 82, (3) New Mexico 64
    - South Regional in New Orleans:
      - (3) Baylor 76, (11) Old Dominion 68
    - West Regional in Oklahoma City:
      - (2) Kansas State 84, (7) BYU 72
    - East Regional in New Orleans:
      - (1) Kentucky 90, (9) Wake Forest 60
- NCAA Division I Women's Tournament:
  - First round (seeds in parentheses):
    - Memphis Regional in Durham, North Carolina:
      - (7) LSU 60, (10) Hartford 39
      - (2) Duke 72, (15) Hampton 37
    - Kansas City Regional in Louisville, Kentucky:
      - (5) Michigan State 72, (12) Bowling Green 62
      - (4) Kentucky 83, (13) Liberty 77
    - Memphis Regional in Knoxville, Tennessee:
      - (1) Tennessee 75, (16) Austin Peay 42
      - (8) Dayton 67, (9) TCU 66
    - Dayton Regional in Tallahassee, Florida:
      - (6) St. John's 65, (11) Princeton 47
      - (3) Florida State 75, (14) Louisiana Tech 61
    - Sacramento Regional in Seattle:
      - (2) Texas A&M 84, (15) Portland State 53
      - (7) Gonzaga 82, (10) North Carolina 76
    - Sacramento Regional in Tempe, Arizona:
      - (4) Oklahoma State 70, (13) Chattanooga 63
      - (5) Georgia 64 (12) Tulane 59
    - Sacramento Regional in Stanford, California:
      - (8) Iowa 70, (9) Rutgers 63
      - (1) Stanford 79, (16) UC Riverside 47
    - Memphis Regional in Berkeley, California:
      - (5) Georgetown 62, (12) Marist 42
      - (4) Baylor 69, (13) Fresno State 55

==== Biathlon ====
- World Cup 8 in Holmenkollen, Norway:
  - Women's pursuit: (gold) Simone Hauswald (GER) 32:05.5 (3 penalty shots) (silver) Darya Domracheva (BLR) 32:10.9 (1) (bronze) Anna Carin Olofsson-Zidek (SWE) 32:45.3 (2)
    - Overall standings after 22 of 25 events: (1) Magdalena Neuner (GER) 791 points (2) Hauswald 737 (3) Helena Jonsson (SWE) 731
    - Final Pursuit standings: (1) Neuner 256 points (2) Hauswald 217 (3) Olga Zaitseva (RUS) 207
  - Men's pursuit: (gold) Martin Fourcade (FRA) 33:46.9 (3 penalty shots) (silver) Simon Schempp (GER) 33:55.9 (0) (bronze) Ivan Tcherezov (RUS) 34:13.1 (1)
    - Overall standings after 22 of 25 events: (1) Emil Hegle Svendsen (NOR) 719 points (2) Christoph Sumann (AUT) 704 (3) Evgeny Ustyugov (RUS) 675
    - Final Pursuit standings: (1) Fourcade 197 points (2) Simon Eder (AUT) 196 (3) Tcherezov 189

==== Cricket ====
- Australia in New Zealand:
  - 1st Test in Wellington, Day 2:
    - Australia 459/5d (131 overs; Michael Clarke 168, Marcus North 112*); New Zealand 108/4 (47 overs).
- England in Bangladesh:
  - 2nd Test in Mirpur, Day 1:
    - Bangladesh 330/8 (94 overs); England.

==== Cross-country skiing ====
- World Cup Final:
  - Stage 3 in Falun, Sweden:
    - Women's Pursuit: (gold) Marit Bjørgen (NOR) (silver) Kristin Størmer Steira (NOR) (bronze) Therese Johaug (NOR)
      - Overall standings: (1) Justyna Kowalczyk (POL) 1904 points (2) Petra Majdič (SLO) 1191 (3) Bjørgen 1120
      - Distance standings: (1) Kowalczyk 929 points (2) Bjørgen 636 (3) Størmer Steira 568
    - Men's Pursuit: (gold) Petter Northug (NOR) (silver) Tobias Angerer (GER) (bronze) Lukáš Bauer (CZE)
      - Overall standings: (1) Northug 1421 points (2) Bauer 963 (3) Marcus Hellner (SWE) 865
      - Distance standings: (1) Northug 749 points (2) Bauer 563 (3) Hellner 483

==== Curling ====
- World Women's Championship in Swift Current, Canada:
  - Draw 1:
    - China 6–8 Germany
    - Russia 6–8 United States
    - Japan 7–4 Latvia
    - Scotland 9–4 Denmark
  - Draw 2:
    - Latvia 2–4 Russia
    - Canada 9–6 Sweden
    - Norway 7–6 Switzerland
    - Japan 3–10 United States

==== Cycling ====
- Milan–San Remo: (gold) Óscar Freire (ESP) (Rabobank) 6h 57' 28" (silver) Tom Boonen (BEL) (Quick-Step) s.t. (bronze) Alessandro Petacchi (ITA) (Lampre–Farnese Vini) s.t.

==== Football (soccer) ====
- CAF Champions League qualification First round, first leg:
  - Curepipe Starlight (Mauritius) 0–3 (Botswana) Gaborone United
  - Supersport United (South Africa) 3–0 (Mozambique) Ferroviário Maputo
  - Zanaco (Zambia) 1–0 (Ivory Coast) ASEC Mimosas
  - APR (Rwanda) 1–0 (Democratic Republic of the Congo) TP Mazembe
  - Tiko United (Cameroon) 2–2 (Nigeria) Heartland
  - Gunners (Zimbabwe) 1–0 (Egypt) Al-Ahly
  - Espérance ST (Tunisia) 4–1 (Burkina Faso) ASFA Yennega
  - Ismaily (Egypt) 3–1 (Réunion) US Stade Tamponnaise
- CAF Confederation Cup First round, first leg:
  - CR Belouizdad (Algeria) 1–0 (Morocco) FAR Rabat
  - Séwé Sport (Ivory Coast) 2–0 (Mali) Stade Malien
  - DC Motema Pembe (Democratic Republic of the Congo) 0–0 (Gabon) FC 105
  - Académica Petróleo (Angola) 2–0 (Nigeria) Enyimba
  - CO Bamako (Mali) 0–0 (Angola) Primeiro de Agosto
  - Ahly Tripoli (Libya) 0–0 (Tunisia) CS Sfaxien
- (Australia) A-League Grand Final in Melbourne:
  - Melbourne Victory 1–1 (2–4 pen.) **Sydney FC**
    - Sydney FC win the title for the second time.

==== Freestyle skiing ====
- World Cup in Sierra Nevada, Spain:
  - Men's skicross: (gold) Michael Schmid (SUI) (silver) Audun Grønvold (NOR) (bronze) Andreas Steffen (SUI)
    - Final Standings: (1) Schmid 815 points (2) Christopher Del Bosco (CAN) 547 (3) Grønvold 530
  - Women's skicross: (gold) Anna Holmlund (SWE) (silver) Ophélie David (FRA) (bronze) Marte Høie Gjefsen (NOR)
    - Final Standings: (1) David 735 points (2) Ashleigh McIvor (CAN) 608 (3) Holmlund 522

==== Rugby union ====
- Six Nations Championship, week 5:
  - Wales 33–10 Italy in Cardiff
  - Ireland 20–23 Scotland in Dublin
    - With this result, France win their fifth Six Nations Championship.
  - France 12–10 England in Paris
    - France complete their ninth Grand Slam and the first since 2004.
    - Final standings: France 10 points, Ireland 6, England 5, Wales 4, Scotland 3, Italy 2.
- 2011 Rugby World Cup qualifying:
  - European Nations Cup First Division, matchday 10:
    - Portugal 9–20 Romania in Lisbon
      - Romania secure third place in the competition and advance to the European qualification playoffs for a spot in the final place playoff.
    - Georgia 36–8 Russia in Trabzon, Turkey
      - In a contest between teams already qualified for the World Cup, Georgia's win gives them the ENC title for the second straight time and third overall.
    - Germany 17–21 Spain in Heidelberg
      - Germany are relegated to European Nations Cup Division 2A.
      - Standings (10 games unless stated otherwise): Georgia 27 points, Russia 25, Portugal 21, Romania 20 (9), Spain 13 (9), Germany 10.

==== Short track speed skating ====
- World Championships in Sofia, Bulgaria:
  - Ladies 500 metres: (gold) Wang Meng (CHN) 43.619 (silver) Kalyna Roberge (CAN) +0.060 (bronze) Marianne St-Gelais (CAN) +0.128
    - Overall standings: (1) Park Seung-hi (KOR) and Wang 34 points (3) Roberge 26
  - Men 500 metres: (gold) Liang Wenhao (CHN) 41.383 (silver) François Hamelin (CAN) +0.073 (bronze) François-Louis Tremblay (CAN) +0.143
    - Overall standings: (1) Liang and Kwak Yoon-gy (KOR) (3) Hamelin and Sung Si-bak (KOR) 21.

==== Snowboarding ====
- World Cup in La Molina, Spain:
  - Men's half-pipe: (gold) Fredrik Austbø (NOR) (silver) Christophe Schmidt (GER) (bronze) Justin Lamoureux (CAN)
    - Overall standings after 28 of 29 events: (1) Benjamin Karl (AUT) 6600 points (2) Pierre Vaultier (FRA) 5800 (3) Andreas Prommegger (AUT) 4810
    - Final Halfpipe standings: (1) Lamoureux 2400 points (2) Janne Korpi (FIN) 1730 (3) Schmidt 1690
  - Women's half-pipe: (gold) Holly Crawford (AUS) (silver) Mercedes Nicoll (CAN) (bronze) Paulina Ligocka (POL)
    - Overall standings after 23 of 24 events: (1) Maëlle Ricker (CAN) 5290 points (2) Nicolien Sauerbreij (NED) 4800 (3) Helene Olafsen (NOR) 4710
    - Final Halfpipe standings: (1) Cai Xuetong (CHN) 3040 points (2) Sun Zhifeng (CHN) 2805 (3) Crawford 2600

==== Ski jumping ====
- Ski-Flying World Championships in Planica, Slovenia:
  - (gold) Simon Ammann (SUI) 935.8 points (silver) Gregor Schlierenzauer (AUT) 910.3 (bronze) Anders Jacobsen (NOR) 894.0

=== March 19, 2010 (Friday) ===
==== Basketball ====
- NCAA Division I Men's Tournament:
  - First round (seeds in parentheses):
    - East Regional in Buffalo, New York:
      - (2) West Virginia 77, (15) Morgan State 50
      - (10) Missouri 86, (7) Clemson 78
    - East Regional in Jacksonville, Florida:
      - (12) Cornell 78, (5) Temple 65
      - (4) Wisconsin 53, (13) Wofford 49
    - West Regional in Milwaukee:
      - (6) Xavier 65, (11) Minnesota 54
      - (3) Pittsburgh 89, (14) Oakland 66
    - South Regional in Spokane, Washington:
      - (4) Purdue 72, (13) Siena 64
      - (5) Texas A&M 69, (12) Utah State 53
    - West Regional in Buffalo, New York:
      - (8) Gonzaga 67, (9) Florida State 60
      - (1) Syracuse 79, (16) Vermont 56
    - South Regional in Jacksonville, Florida:
      - (1) Duke 73, (16) Arkansas–Pine Bluff 44
      - (8) California 77, (9) Louisville 62
    - Midwest Regional in Milwaukee:
      - (10) Georgia Tech 64, (7) Oklahoma State 59
      - (2) Ohio State 68, (15) UC Santa Barbara 51
    - Midwest Regional in Spokane, Washington:
      - (5) Michigan State 70, (12) New Mexico State 67
      - (4) Maryland 89, (13) Houston 77
- (Russia) Russian Cup Final:
  - UNICS Kazan 74–80 **CSKA Moscow**
    - CSKA Moscow win the Cup for the fourth time.
- NBA news: In the Cleveland Cavaliers' 92–85 win over the Chicago Bulls, LeBron James becomes the youngest player in NBA history to amass 15,000 career points. (AP via ESPN)

==== Cricket ====
- Australia in New Zealand:
  - 1st Test in Wellington, Day 1:
    - Australia 316/4 (90 overs; Michael Clarke 100*); New Zealand.

==== Cross-country skiing ====
- World Cup Final:
  - Stage 2 in Falun, Sweden:
    - Women's 2.5 km Classic: (gold) Justyna Kowalczyk (POL) (silver) Marit Bjørgen (NOR) (bronze) Charlotte Kalla (SWE)
      - Overall standings: (1) Kowalczyk 1882 points (2) Petra Majdič (SLO) 1191 (3) Bjørgen 1070
      - Distance standings: (1) Kowalczyk 907 points (2) Bjørgen 586 (3) Kristin Størmer Steira (NOR) 522
    - Men's 3.3 km Classic: (gold) Dario Cologna (SUI) (silver) Mats Larsson (SWE) (bronze) Maxim Vylegzhanin (RUS)
      - Overall standings: (1) Petter Northug (NOR) 1371 points (2) Lukáš Bauer (CZE) 920 (3) Marcus Hellner (SWE) 825
      - Distance standings: (1) Northug 699 points (2) Bauer 520 (3) Hellner 443

==== Football (soccer) ====
- CAF Champions League qualification First round, first leg:
  - Club Africain (Tunisia) 1–1 (Algeria) JS Kabylie
  - Ittihad (Libya) 1–1 (Morocco) Difaa El Jadida
- CAF Confederation Cup First round, first leg:
  - CAPS United (Zimbabwe) – (South Africa) Moroka Swallows postponed to March 21.
  - Lengthens (Zimbabwe) 0–3 (Tanzania) Simba

==== Short track speed skating ====
- World Championships in Sofia, Bulgaria:
  - Ladies 1500 metres: (gold) Park Seung-hi (KOR) 2:21.570 (silver) Lee Eun-byul (KOR) +0.095 (bronze) Cho Ha-ri (KOR) +0.251
  - Men 1500 metres: (gold) Kwak Yoon-gy (KOR) 2:24.316 (silver) Sung Si-bak (KOR) +0.057 (bronze) Lee Ho-suk (KOR) +0.143

==== Ski jumping ====
- Ski-Flying World Championships in Planica, Slovenia:
  - Standings after two rounds: (1) Simon Ammann (SUI) 445.6 points (215.5m/216.5m) (2) Adam Małysz (POL) 442.8 (217.5/215.0) (3) Gregor Schlierenzauer (AUT) 428.4 (209.5/205.0)

==== Snowboarding ====
- World Cup in La Molina, Spain:
  - Men's snowboard cross: (gold) Pierre Vaultier (FRA) (silver) Alex Pullin (AUS) (bronze) Pat Holland (USA)
    - Overall standings after 27 of 29 events: (1) Benjamin Karl (AUT) 6600 points (2) Vaultier 5120 (3) Andreas Prommegger (AUT) 4810
    - Final Snowboard cross standings: (1) Vaultier 5120 points (2) Pullin 2610 (3) Graham Watanabe (USA) 2570
  - Women's snowboard cross: (gold) Helene Olafsen (NOR) (silver) Simona Meiler (SUI) (bronze) Maëlle Ricker (CAN)
    - Overall standings after 22 of 24 events: (1) Nicolien Sauerbreij (NED) 4800 points (2) Ricker 4760 (3) Olafsen 4510
    - Final Snowboard cross standings: (1) Ricker 4760 points (2) Olafsen 4350 (3) Dominique Maltais (CAN) 3460

=== March 18, 2010 (Thursday) ===
==== Basketball ====
- NCAA Division I Men's Tournament:
  - First round (seeds in parentheses):
    - South Regional in New Orleans:
      - (11) Old Dominion 51, (6) Notre Dame 50
      - (3) Baylor 68, (14) Sam Houston State 59
    - South Regional in Providence, Rhode Island:
      - (2) Villanova 73, (15) Robert Morris 70 (OT)
      - (10) Saint Mary's 80, (7) Richmond 71
    - West Regional in San Jose, California:
      - (13) Murray State 66, (4) Vanderbilt 65
      - (5) Butler 77, (12) UTEP 59
    - West Regional in Oklahoma City:
      - (7) BYU 99, (10) Florida 92 (2 OT)
      - (2) Kansas State 82, (15) North Texas 62
    - East Regional in New Orleans:
      - (1) Kentucky 100, (16) East Tennessee State 71
      - (9) Wake Forest 81, (8) Texas 80 (OT)
    - East Regional in San Jose, California:
      - (11) Washington 80, (6) Marquette 78
      - (3) New Mexico 62, (14) Montana 57
    - Midwest Regional in Oklahoma City:
      - (9) Northern Iowa 69, (8) UNLV 66
      - (1) Kansas 90, (16) Lehigh 74
    - Midwest Regional in Providence, Rhode Island:
      - (14) Ohio 97, (3) Georgetown 83
      - (6) Tennessee 62, (11) San Diego State 59

==== Biathlon ====
- World Cup 8 in Holmenkollen, Norway:
  - Women's sprint: (gold) Simone Hauswald (GER) 20:42.4 (0 penalty shots) (silver) Darya Domracheva (BLR) 20:47.3 (0) (bronze) Anna Carin Olofsson-Zidek (SWE) 20:56.8 (0)
    - Overall standings after 21 of 25 events: (1) Magdalena Neuner (GER) 757 points (2) Helena Jonsson (SWE) 704 (3) Andrea Henkel (GER) 679
    - Sprint standings after 9 of 10 events: (1) Hauswald 302 points (2) Neuner 300 (3) Olofsson-Zidek 298 (3) Kati Wilhelm (GER) 298
  - Men's sprint: (gold) Martin Fourcade (FRA) 26:08.1 (0 penalty shots) (silver) Maxim Tchoudov (RUS) 26:15.2 (0) (bronze) Christoph Sumann (AUT) 26:17.5 (0)
    - Overall standings after 21 of 25 events: (1) Sumann 677 points (2) Emil Hegle Svendsen (NOR) 676 (3) Evgeny Ustyugov (RUS) 637
    - Sprint standings after 9 of 10 events: (1) Svendsen 320 points (2) Ivan Tcherezov (RUS) 284 (3) Fourcade 253

==== Darts ====
- Premier League round 6 in Brighton, England:
  - Phil Taylor (ENG) 8–3 Terry Jenkins (ENG)
  - Raymond van Barneveld (NED) 7–7 Mervyn King (ENG)
  - Ronnie Baxter (ENG) 6–8 Adrian Lewis (ENG)
  - Simon Whitlock (AUS) 4–8 James Wade (ENG)
    - High Checkout: Simon Whitlock 170
      - Standings after 6 matches: Taylor 11 points, King 8, Baxter 6, Lewis, Whitlock, van Barneveld 5, Wade, Jenkins 4.

==== Football (soccer) ====
- UEFA Europa League Round of 16, second leg: (first leg score in parentheses)
  - **Fulham** (England) 4–1 (1–3) (Italy) Juventus. Fulham win 5–4 on aggregate.
  - Werder Bremen (Germany) 4–4 (1–1) (Spain) **Valencia**. 5–5 on aggregate; Valencia win on away goals.
  - Marseille (France) 1–2 (1–1) (Portugal) **Benfica**. Benfica win 3–2 on aggregate.
  - **Standard Liège** (Belgium) 1–0 (3–1) (Greece) Panathinaikos. Standard Liège win 4–1 on aggregate.
  - **Liverpool** (England) 3–0 (0–1) (France) Lille. Liverpool win 3–1 on aggregate.
  - Sporting CP (Portugal) 2–2 (0–0) (Spain) **Atlético Madrid**. 2–2 on aggregate; Atlético Madrid win on away goals.
  - Anderlecht (Belgium) 4–3 (1–3) (Germany) **Hamburg**. Hamburg win 6–5 on aggregate.
  - **Wolfsburg** (Germany) 2–1 (a.e.t.) (1–1) (Russia) Rubin Kazan. Wolfsburg win 3–2 on aggregate.
- Copa Libertadores second stage:
  - Group 1: Independiente Medellín (Colombia) 0–0 (Uruguay) Racing
    - Standings after 3 matches: (Brazil) Corinthians 7 points, Racing 4, Independiente Medellín 3, (Paraguay) Cerro Porteño 1.
  - Group 2: São Paulo (Brazil) 3–0 (Paraguay) Nacional
    - Standings after 4 matches: São Paulo 9 points, (Colombia) Once Caldas 8, (Mexico) Monterrey 5, ~~Nacional 0~~.
  - Group 5: Cerro (Uruguay) 0–0 (Brazil) Internacional
    - Standings: Cerro 7 points (3 matches), Internacional 5, (Ecuador) Deportivo Quito 1 (2), (Ecuador) Emelec 0 (2).
- CONCACAF Champions League quarterfinals, second leg: (first leg score in parentheses)
  - **UNAM** (Mexico) 6–1 (0–2) (Honduras) Marathón. UNAM win 6–3 on aggregate.
    - UNAM's result completes a Mexican sweep of the semi-finals, with all four qualified teams from the country.

==== Freestyle skiing ====
- World Cup in Sierra Nevada, Spain:
  - Men's moguls: (gold) Guilbaut Colas (FRA) (silver) Dale Begg-Smith (AUS) (bronze) Pierre Ochs (FRA)
    - Final Standings: (1) Begg-Smith 693 points (2) Colas 615 (3) Jesper Björnlund (SWE) 552
  - Women's moguls: (gold) Eliza Outtrim (USA) (silver) Margarita Marbler (AUT) (bronze) Heather McPhie (USA)
    - Final Standings: (1) Jennifer Heil (CAN) 725 points (2) McPhie 616 (3) Hannah Kearney (USA) 616

=== March 17, 2010 (Wednesday) ===
==== Basketball ====
- The NBA Board of Governors approves Michael Jordan's bid to purchase a majority interest in the Charlotte Bobcats from founding owner Bob Johnson. Jordan, previously a minority owner of the Bobcats, becomes the first former NBA player ever to own a majority interest in a league franchise. (AP via ESPN)

==== Cross-country skiing ====
- World Cup Final:
  - Stage 1 in Stockholm, Sweden:
    - Women's Sprint Classic: (gold) Anna Olsson (SWE) (silver) Justyna Kowalczyk (POL) (bronze) Marit Bjørgen (NOR)
      - Overall standings: (1) Kowalczyk 1832 points (2) Petra Majdič (SLO) 1191 (3) Bjørgen 1024
      - Final sprint standings: (1) Kowalczyk 575 points (2) Bjørgen 484 (3) Majdič 446
    - Men's Sprint Classic: (gold) Nikita Kriukov (RUS) (silver) Petter Northug (NOR) (bronze) Emil Jönsson (SWE)
      - Overall standings: (1) Northug 1331 points (2) Lukáš Bauer (CZE) 902 (3) Marcus Hellner (SWE) 793
      - Final sprint standings: (1) Jönsson 506 points (2) Northug 352 (3) Alexey Petukhov (RUS) 347

==== Football (soccer) ====
- UEFA Champions League First knockout stage, second leg: (first leg score in parentheses)
  - **Barcelona** (Spain) 4–0 (1–1) (Germany) Stuttgart. Barcelona win 5–1 on aggregate.
  - **Bordeaux** (France) 2–1 (1–0) (Greece) Olympiacos. Bordeaux win 3–1 on aggregate.
- UEFA Women's Champions League quarter-finals, second leg: (first leg score in parentheses)
  - Montpellier (France) 2–2 (0–0) (Sweden) **Umeå**. 2–2 on aggregate, Umeå win on away goals.
  - Torres (Italy) 1–0 (0–3) (France) **Lyon**. Lyon win 3–1 on aggregate.
  - Røa (Norway) 0–5 (0–5) (Germany) **Turbine Potsdam**. Turbine Potsdam win 10–0 on aggregate.
- Copa Libertadores second stage:
  - Group 1: Cerro Porteño (Paraguay) 0–1 (Brazil) Corinthians
    - Standings: Corinthians 7 points (3 matches), (Uruguay) Racing 3 (2), (Colombia) Independiente Medellín 2 (2), Cerro Porteño 1 (3).
  - Group 2: Monterrey (Mexico) 2–2 (Colombia) Once Caldas
    - Standings: Once Caldas 8 points (4 matches), (Brazil) São Paulo 6 (3), Monterrey 5 (4), (Paraguay) Nacional 0 (3).
  - Group 8:
    - Caracas (Venezuela) 0–0 (Chile) Universidad Católica
    - Universidad de Chile 2–1 (Brazil) Flamengo
      - Standings after 3 matches: Universidad de Chile 7, Flamengo 6, Universidad Católica 2, Caracas 1.
- CONCACAF Champions League quarterfinals, second leg: (first leg score in parentheses)
  - **Toluca** (Mexico) 3–2 (2–2) (United States) Columbus Crew. Toluca win 5–4 on aggregate.
  - **Cruz Azul** (Mexico) 3–0 (1–0) (Panama) Árabe Unido. Cruz Azul win 4–0 on aggregate.
- AFC Cup group stage, Round 2:
  - Group C:
    - Nasaf Qarshi (Uzbekistan) 2–1 (Syria) Al-Jaish
    - Kazma (Kuwait) 1–0 (Lebanon) Al-Ahed
      - Standings after 2 matches: Nasaf Qarshi, Kazma 6 points, Al-Jaish, Al-Ahed 0.
  - Group D:
    - Al-Ittihad (Syria) 0–0 (Kuwait) Al-Qadsia
    - Al-Nejmeh (Lebanon) 3–0 (India) Kingfisher East Bengal
      - Standings after 2 matches: Al-Ittihad, Al-Nejmeh 4 points, Al-Qadsia 2, Kingfisher East Bengal 0.
  - Group G:
    - VB Sports Club (Maldives) 1–0 (Hong Kong) South China
    - Muangthong United – (Indonesia) Persiwa Wamena. Match postponed due to the political unrest in Thailand.
      - Standings: VB Sports Club 6 points (2 matches), Muangthong United 1 (1), South China 1 (2), Persiwa Wamena 0 (1).
  - Group H:
    - SHB Ðà Nẵng (Vietnam) 3–2 (Singapore) Geylang United
    - NT Realty Wofoo Tai Po (Hong Kong) 0–1 (Thailand) Thai Port
      - Standings after 2 matches: SHB Ðà Nẵng 6 points, Thai Port 3, Geylang United, NT Realty Wofoo Tai Po 1.

=== March 16, 2010 (Tuesday) ===
==== Basketball ====
- NCAA Division I Men's Tournament:
  - Opening Round Game in Dayton, Ohio:
    - Arkansas–Pine Bluff 61, Winthrop 44

==== Cricket ====
- England in Bangladesh:
  - 1st Test in Chittagong, Day 5:
    - England 599/6d and 209/7d; Bangladesh 296 and 331 (Junaid Siddique 106). **England win by 181 runs, lead the 2-match series 1–0**.

==== Cycling ====
- Tirreno–Adriatico:
  - Stage 7: (1) Edvald Boasson Hagen (NOR) (Team Sky) 3h 52' 36" (2) Alessandro Petacchi (ITA) (Lampre–Farnese Vini) s.t. (3) Sacha Modolo (ITA) (Colnago–CSF Inox) s.t.
    - Final general classification: (1) Stefano Garzelli (ITA) (Acqua & Sapone) 30h 51' 36" (2) Michele Scarponi (ITA) (Androni Giocattoli) s.t. (3) Cadel Evans (AUS) (BMC Racing Team) + 12"

==== Football (soccer) ====
- UEFA Champions League First knockout stage, second leg: (first leg score in parentheses)
  - Sevilla (Spain) 1–2 (1–1) (Russia) **CSKA Moscow**. CSKA Moscow win 3–2 on aggregate.
  - Chelsea (England) 0–1 (1–2) (Italy) **Internazionale**. Internazionale win 3–1 on aggregate.
- Copa Libertadores second stage:
  - Group 3: Juan Aurich (Peru) 4–2 (Peru) Alianza Lima
    - Standings: Alianza Lima 9 points (4 matches), Juan Aurich 6 (4), (Argentina) Estudiantes 4 (3), (Bolivia) Bolívar 1 (3).
  - Group 6:
    - Banfield (Argentina) 0–2 (Uruguay) Nacional
    - Morelia (Mexico) 2–1 (Ecuador) Deportivo Cuenca
      - Standings after 4 matches: Nacional 8 points, Banfield 7, Morelia 4, Deportivo Cuenca 3.
  - Group 7: Colo-Colo (Chile) 1–1 (Argentina) Vélez Sársfield
    - Standings after 3 matches: Vélez Sársfield 7 points, (Brazil) Cruzeiro, Colo-Colo 4, (Venezuela) Deportivo Italia 1.
- CONCACAF Champions League quarterfinals, second leg: (first leg score in parentheses)
  - **Pachuca** (Mexico) 2–1 (1–1) (Guatemala) Comunicaciones. Pachuca win 3–2 on aggregate.
- AFC Cup group stage, Round 2:
  - Group A:
    - Shabab Al-Ordon (Jordan) 2–2 (Syria) Al-Karamah
    - Saham (Oman) 1–0 (Yemen) Al-Ahli
      - Standings after 2 games: Al-Karamah, Shabab Al-Ordon 4 points, Saham 3, Al-Ahli 0.
  - Group B: Churchill Brothers (India) 2–2 Al-Kuwait
    - Standings: Al-Kuwait 2 points (2 games), (Yemen) Al-Hilal, Churchill Brothers 1 (1).
  - Group E:
    - Al-Rayyan (Qatar) 3–2 (Oman) Al-Nahda
    - Al-Riffa (Bahrain) 2–1 (Jordan) Al-Wihdat
      - Standings after 2 games: Al-Rayyan, Al-Riffa 6 points, Al-Nahda, Al-Wihdat 0.
  - Group F:
    - Sriwijaya (Indonesia) 6–1 (Malaysia) Selangor
    - Bình Dương (Vietnam) 3–0 (Maldives) Victory SC
      - Standings after 2 games: Sriwijaya, Bình Dương 4 points, Victory, Selangor 1.

==== Golf ====
- Tiger Woods announces that he will end his self-imposed absence from competitive golf at the Masters in April. (ESPN)

=== March 15, 2010 (Monday) ===
==== Basketball ====
- Top seeds in the 2010 NCAA Division I Women's Basketball Tournament:
  - Dayton Regional: Connecticut (#1 overall seed)
  - Memphis Regional: Tennessee
  - Sacramento Regional: Stanford
  - Kansas City Regional: Nebraska

==== Cricket ====
- England in Bangladesh:
  - 1st Test in Chittagong, Day 4:
    - England 599/6d (138.3 overs) and 209/7d (49.3 overs); Bangladesh 296 (90.3 overs) and 191/5 (75 overs). Bangladesh require another 322 runs with 5 wickets remaining.

==== Golf ====
- PGA Tour:
  - Puerto Rico Open in Río Grande, Puerto Rico:
    - Winner: Derek Lamely (USA) 269 (−19)
      - Lamely earns his first title on the PGA Tour, becoming the first rookie to win on the Tour since Marc Turnesa won the 2008 Justin Timberlake Shriners Hospitals for Children Open.

=== March 14, 2010 (Sunday) ===
==== Alpine skiing ====
- World Cup in Garmisch-Partenkirchen, Germany:
  - Team event: (gold) Lucie Hrstková/Šárka Záhrobská/Ondřej Bank/Kryštof Krýzl (CZE) (silver) Nadja Kamer/Nadia Styger/Fabienne Suter/Marc Berthod/Marc Gini/Sandro Viletta (SUI) (bronze) Elisabeth Görgl/Michaela Kirchgasser/Kathrin Zettel/Romed Baumann/Marcel Hirscher/Benjamin Raich (AUT)

==== Athletics ====
- World Indoor Championships in Doha, Qatar:
  - Men's events:
    - 800 metres: (gold) Abubaker Kaki Khamis (SUD) 1:46.23 (silver) Boaz Kiplagat Lalang (KEN) 1:46.39 (bronze) Adam Kszczot (POL) 1:46.69
    - 3000 metres: (gold) Bernard Lagat (USA) 7:37.97 (silver) Sergio Sánchez (ESP) 7:39.55 (bronze) Sammy Alex Mutahi (KEN) 7:39.90
    - 60 metres hurdles: (gold) Dayron Robles (CUB) 7.34 (silver) Terrence Trammell (USA) 7.36 (bronze) David Oliver (USA) 7.44
    - 4 × 400 metres relay: (gold) Jamaal Torrance/Greg Nixon/Tavaris Tate/Bershawn Jackson (USA) 3:03.40 (silver) Cédric Van Branteghem/Kevin Borlée/Antoine Gillet/Jonathan Borlée (BEL) 3:06.94 (bronze) Conrad Williams/Nigel Levine/Christopher Clarke/Richard Buck (GBR) 3:07.52
    - High Jump: (gold) Ivan Ukhov (RUS) 2.36 (silver) Yaroslav Rybakov (RUS) 2.31 (bronze) Dusty Jonas (USA) 2.31
    - Triple Jump: (gold) Teddy Tamgho (FRA) 17.90 (WR) (silver) Yoandri Betanzos (CUB) 17.69 (bronze) Arnie David Giralt (CUB) 17.36
  - Women's events:
    - 60 metres: (gold) Veronica Campbell-Brown (JAM) 7.00 (silver) LaVerne Jones-Ferrette (ISV) 7.03 (bronze) Carmelita Jeter (USA) 7.05
    - 800 metres: (gold) Mariya Savinova (RUS) 1:58.26 (silver) Jenny Meadows (GBR) 1:58.43 (bronze) Alysia Johnson (USA) 1:59.60
    - 1500 metres: (gold) Kalkidan Gezahegne (ETH) 4:08.14 (silver) Natalia Rodríguez (ESP) 4:08.30 (bronze) Gelete Burka (ETH) 4:08.39
    - 4 × 400 metres relay: (gold) Debbie Dunn/DeeDee Trotter/Natasha Hastings/Allyson Felix (USA) 3:27.34 (silver) Svetlana Pospelova/Natalya Nazarova/Kseniya Vdovina/Tatyana Firova (RUS) 3:27.44 (bronze) Bobby-Gaye Wilkins/Clora Williams/Davita Prendergast/Novlene Williams-Mills (JAM) 3:28.49
    - Pole Vault: (gold) Fabiana Murer (BRA) 4.80 (silver) Svetlana Feofanova (RUS) 4.80 (bronze) Anna Rogowska (POL) 4.70
    - Long Jump: (gold) Brittney Reese (USA) 6.70 (silver) Naide Gomes (POR) 6.67 (bronze) Keila Costa (BRA) 6.63
    - Shot Put: (gold) Nadzeya Astapchuk (BLR) 20.85 (silver) Valerie Vili (NZL) 20.49 (bronze) Natallia Mikhnevich (BLR) 20.42

==== Auto racing ====
- Formula One:
  - Bahrain Grand Prix in Sakhir, Bahrain:
    - (1) Fernando Alonso (ESP) (Ferrari) 1:39:20.396 (2) Felipe Massa (BRA) (Ferrari) +16.099 (3) Lewis Hamilton (GBR) (McLaren–Mercedes) +23.182
      - Drivers' Championship standings (after 1 of 19 races): (1) Alonso 25 points (2) Massa 18 (3) Hamilton 15
      - Constructors' Championship standings: (1) Ferrari 43 points (2) McLaren-Mercedes 21 (3) Mercedes 18
- IndyCar Series:
  - São Paulo Indy 300 in São Paulo, Brazil:
    - (1) Will Power (AUS) (Team Penske) 2:00:57.7112 (2) Ryan Hunter-Reay (USA) (Andretti Autosport) +1.8581 (3) Vítor Meira (BRA) (A. J. Foyt Enterprises) +9.7094
      - Drivers' standings (after 1 of 17 races): (1) Power 50 points (2) Hunter-Reay 40 (3) Meira 35
- V8 Supercars:
  - Clipsal 500 in Adelaide, South Australia:
    - Race 6: (1) Garth Tander (AUS) (Holden Commodore) (2) James Courtney (AUS) (Ford Falcon) (3) Mark Winterbottom (AUS) (Ford Falcon)
      - Drivers' standings (after 6 of 26 races): (1) Jamie Whincup (AUS) (Holden Commodore) 771 points (2) Winterbottom 714 (3) Courtney 696

==== Badminton ====
- BWF Super Series:
  - All England Super Series in Birmingham:
    - Men's Singles: Lee Chong Wei (KOR) def. Kenichi Tago (JPN) 21–19, 21–19.
    - Women's Singles: Tine Rasmussen (DEN) def. Wang Yihan (CHN) 21–14, 18–21, 21–19.
    - Men's Doubles: Lars Paaske/Jonas Rasmussen (DEN) def. Mathias Boe/Carsten Mogensen (DEN) 21–23, 21–19, 26–24.
    - Women's Doubles: Du Jing/Yu Yang (CHN) def. Cheng Shu/Zhao Yunlei (CHN) 20–22, 21–16, 21–13.
    - Mixed Doubles: Zhang Nan/Zhao Yunlei (CHN) def. Nova Widianto/Liliyana Natsir (IDN) 21–18, 23–25, 21–18.

==== Basketball ====
- U.S. college conference championship games:
  - Men's (winners advance to the NCAA tournament):
    - Atlantic Coast Conference in Greensboro, North Carolina:
      - Duke 65, Georgia Tech 61
    - Atlantic 10 Conference in Atlantic City, New Jersey:
      - Temple 56, Richmond 52
    - Big Ten Conference in Indianapolis:
      - Ohio State 90, Minnesota 61
    - Southeastern Conference in Nashville:
      - Kentucky 75, Mississippi State 74 (OT)
  - Women's (winners advance to the NCAA tournament):
    - Big 12 Conference in Kansas City, Missouri:
      - Texas A&M 74, Oklahoma 67
    - Big South Conference in High Point, North Carolina:
      - Liberty 68, Gardner–Webb 66
    - Colonial Athletic Association in Harrisonburg, Virginia:
      - James Madison 67, Old Dominion 53
    - Horizon League in Green Bay, Wisconsin:
      - Cleveland State 66, Butler 57
    - Missouri Valley Conference in St. Charles, Missouri:
      - Northern Iowa 54, Creighton 53
    - Northeast Conference in Brooklyn:
      - Saint Francis 77, LIU 68
    - Pacific-10 Conference in Los Angeles:
      - Stanford 70, UCLA 46
- Top seeds in the men's NCAA Tournament:
  - Midwest Region: Kansas (#1 overall seed)
  - West Region: Syracuse
  - East Region: Kentucky
  - South Region: Duke

==== Biathlon ====
- World Cup 7 in Kontiolahti, Finland:
  - Women's pursuit: (gold) Darya Domracheva (BLR) 31:32.6 (1 penalty) (silver) Magdalena Neuner (GER) 31:44.7 (3) (bronze) Simone Hauswald (GER) 31:50.7 (1)
    - Overall standings after 20 of 25 events: (1) Neuner 719 points (2) Helena Jonsson (SWE) 687 (3) Andrea Henkel (GER) 652
    - Pursuit standings after 5 of 6 events: (1) Neuner 235 points (2) Henkel 194 (3) Hauswald 182
  - Men's pursuit: (gold) Martin Fourcade (FRA) 32:35.1 (1 penalty) (silver) Christian de Lorenzi (ITA) 32:45.2 (1) (bronze) Vincent Jay (FRA) 32:50.7 (0)
    - Overall standings after 20 of 25 events: (1) Emil Hegle Svendsen (NOR) 650 points (2) Christoph Sumann (AUT) 629 (3) Evgeny Ustyugov (RUS) 603
    - Pursuit standings after 5 of 6 events: (1) Simon Eder (AUT) 196 points (2) Dominik Landertinger (AUT) 165 (3) Ivan Tcherezov (RUS) 160

==== Cricket ====
- England in Bangladesh:
  - 1st Test in Chittagong, Day 3:
    - England 599/6d (138.3 overs) and 131/5 (36 overs); Bangladesh 296 (90.3 overs). England lead by 434 runs with 5 wickets remaining in the second innings.
- Zimbabwe in West Indies:
  - 5th ODI in Kingstown, St Vincent:
    - Zimbabwe 161 (50 overs); West Indies 165/6 (27.4 overs). **West Indies win by 4 wickets; win 5–match series 4–1.**

==== Cross-country skiing ====
- World Cup in Oslo, Norway:
  - Women's Sprint Freestyle: (gold) Marit Bjørgen (NOR) (silver) Kikkan Randall (USA) (bronze) Natalya Korostelyova (RUS)
    - Overall standings: (1) Justyna Kowalczyk (POL) 1786 points (2) Petra Majdič (SLO) 1191 (3) Aino-Kaisa Saarinen (FIN) 999
    - Sprint standings: (1) Kowalczyk 529 points (2) Majdič 446 (3) Bjørgen 441
  - Men's Sprint Freestyle: (gold) Anders Gløersen (NOR) (silver) Alexey Petukhov (RUS) (bronze) Marcus Hellner (SWE)
    - Overall standings: (1) Petter Northug (NOR) 1285 points (2) Lukáš Bauer (CZE) 902 (3) Hellner 759
    - Sprint standings: (1) Emil Jönsson (SWE) 463 points (2) Petukhov 321 (3) Northug 306

==== Cycling ====
- Paris–Nice:
  - Stage 7: (1) Amaël Moinard (FRA) (Cofidis) 2h 52' 09" (2) Thomas Voeckler (FRA) (Bbox Bouygues Telecom) s.t. (3) Alejandro Valverde (ESP) (Caisse d'Epargne) + 3"
    - Final general classification: (1) Alberto Contador (ESP) (Astana) 28h 35' 35" (2) Valverde + 11" (3) Luis León Sánchez (ESP) (Caisse d'Epargne) + 25"

==== Football (soccer) ====
- UEFA Women's Champions League quarter-finals, second leg: (first leg score in parentheses)
  - Arsenal (England) 0–2 (1–2) (Germany) **Duisburg**. Duisburg win 4–1 on aggregate.

==== Freestyle skiing ====
- World Cup in Meiringen–Hasliberg, Switzerland:
  - Men's skicross: (gold) Michael Schmid (SUI) (silver) Audun Grønvold (NOR) (bronze) Christopher Del Bosco (CAN)
    - Standings after 10 of 11 events: (1) Schmid 715 points (2) Del Bosco 497 (3) Grønvold 450
      - Schmid wins the title with a race to spare.
  - Women's skicross: (gold) Anna Holmlund (SWE) (silver) Ophélie David (FRA) (bronze) Marte Høie Gjefsen (NOR)
    - Standings after 10 of 11 events: (1) David 655 points (2) Ashleigh McIvor (CAN) 582 (3) Kelsey Serwa (CAN) 458

==== Golf ====
- World Golf Championships:
  - WGC-CA Championship in Doral, Florida, United States:
    - Winner: Ernie Els (ZAF) 270 (−18)
      - Els wins his second WGC title, which is also his 17th PGA Tour win and 25th on the European Tour.
- PGA Tour:
  - Puerto Rico Open in Río Grande, Puerto Rico:
    - Heavy rains on Thursday forced the start of play to be delayed to Friday. The tournament will conclude on Monday.

==== Nordic combined ====
- World Cup in Lahti, Finland:
  - HS134 / 10 km: (gold) Jason Lamy-Chappuis (FRA) (silver) Felix Gottwald (AUT) (bronze) Magnus Moan (NOR)
    - Final Standings: (1) Lamy-Chappuis 1155 points (2) Gottwald 879 (3) Moan 747

==== Rugby union ====
- Six Nations Championship, week 4:
  - France 46–20 Italy in Paris
    - Standings (after 4 games): France 8 points, Ireland 6, England 5, Wales, Italy 2, Scotland 1.

==== Ski jumping ====
- Nordic Tournament:
  - World Cup in Oslo, Norway:
    - HS 134 (World Cup Final): (gold) Simon Ammann (SUI) 267.7 points (135.5m/124.5m) (silver) Adam Małysz (POL) 258.7 (128.5/136.5) (bronze) Andreas Kofler (AUT) 251.5 (139.5/116.0)
      - Final World Cup standings: (1) Ammann 1649 points (2) Gregor Schlierenzauer (AUT) 1368 (3) Thomas Morgenstern (AUT) 944
      - Final Nordic Tournaments standings: (1) Ammann 1077.6 points (2) Małysz 1033.0 (3) Morgenstern 990.4

==== Snowboarding ====
- World Cup in Valmalenco, Italy:
  - Men's half-pipe: (gold) Michał Ligocki (POL) (silver) Roger S. Kleivdal (NOR) (bronze) Patrick Burgener (SUI)
    - Overall standings after 26 of 29 events: (1) Benjamin Karl (AUT) 5600 points (2) Pierre Vaultier (FRA) 4950 (3) Andreas Prommegger (AUT) 4450
    - Halfpipe standings after 6 of 7 events: (1) Justin Lamoureux (CAN) 1800 points (2) Janne Korpi (FIN) 1730 (3) Kazuhiro Kokubo (JPN) 1600
  - Women's half-pipe: (gold) Holly Crawford (AUS) (silver) Ursina Haller (SUI) (bronze) Mercedes Nicoll (CAN)
    - Overall standings after 21 of 24 events: (1) Maëlle Ricker (CAN) 4760 points (2) Nicolien Sauerbreij (NED) 3800 (3) Doris Guenther (AUT) 3710 (3) Helene Olafsen (NOR) 3710
    - Halfpipe standings after 6 of 7 events: (1) Cai Xuetong (CHN) 3040 points (2) Sun Zhifeng (CHN) 2805 (3) Chen Xu (CHN) 1840

==== Speed skating ====
- World Cup 7 in Heerenveen, Netherlands:
  - 1000 m Men: (gold) Shani Davis (USA) (silver) Stefan Groothuis (NED) (bronze) Mark Tuitert (NED)
    - Final Standings: (1) Davis 750 points (2) Tuitert 425 (3) Groothuis 355
  - 1000 m Women: (gold) Yekaterina Shikhova (RUS) (silver) Annette Gerritsen (NED) (bronze) Natasja Bruintjes (NED)
    - Final Standings: (1) Christine Nesbitt (CAN) 472 points (2) Margot Boer (NED) 395 (3) Monique Angermüller (GER) 351
  - Team Pursuit Women: (gold) Kristina Groves/Cindy Klassen/Brittany Schussler (CAN) (silver) Stephanie Beckert/Anni Friesinger-Postma/Katrin Mattscherodt (GER) (bronze) Masako Hozumi/Nao Kodaira/Maki Tabata (JPN)
    - Final Standings: (1) Canada 430 points (2) Russia 320 (3) Germany 310
  - Team Pursuit Men: (gold) Håvard Bøkko/Henrik Christiansen/Mikael Flygind Larsen (NOR) (silver) Mathieu Giroux/Denny Morrison/Lucas Makowsky (CAN) (bronze) Ryan Bedford/Davis/Jonathan Kuck (USA)
    - Final Standings: (1) Norway 380 points (2) Netherlands 350 (3) Canada 306

=== March 13, 2010 (Saturday) ===
==== Alpine skiing ====
- Men's World Cup in Garmisch-Partenkirchen, Germany:
  - Slalom: (gold) Felix Neureuther (GER) (silver) Manfred Pranger (AUT) (bronze) André Myhrer (SWE)
    - Final Overall standings: (1) Carlo Janka (SUI) 1197 points (2) Benjamin Raich (AUT) 1091 (3) Didier Cuche (SUI) 952
    - Final Slalom standings: (1) Reinfried Herbst (AUT) 534 points (2) Julien Lizeroux (FRA) 512 (3) Silvan Zurbriggen (SUI) 365
- Women's World Cup in Garmisch-Partenkirchen, Germany:
  - Slalom: (gold) Marlies Schild (AUT) (silver) Kathrin Zettel (AUT) (bronze) Maria Riesch (GER)
    - Final Overall standings: (1) Lindsey Vonn (USA) 1671 points (2) Riesch 1516 (3) Anja Pärson (SWE) 1047
    - Final Slalom standings: (1) Riesch 493 points (2) Zettel 490 (3) Schild 420

==== Athletics ====
- World Indoor Championships in Doha, Qatar:
  - Men's events:
    - 60 metres: (gold) Dwain Chambers (GBR) 6.48 (silver) Mike Rodgers (USA) 6.53 (bronze) Daniel Bailey (ANT) 6.57
    - 400 metres: (gold) Chris Brown (BAH) 45.96 (silver) William Collazo (CUB) 46.31 (bronze) Jamaal Torrance (USA) 46.43
    - 1500 metres: (gold) Deresse Mekonnen (ETH) 3:41.86 (silver) Abdalaati Iguider (MAR) 3:41.96 (bronze) Haron Keitany (KEN) 3:42.32
    - Long Jump: (gold) Fabrice Lapierre (AUS) 8.17 (silver) Godfrey Khotso Mokoena (RSA) 8.08 (bronze) Mitchell Watt (AUS) 8.05
    - Pole vault: (gold) Steven Hooker (AUS) 6.01 (silver) Malte Mohr (GER) 5.70 (bronze) Alexander Straub (GER) 5.65
    - Shot Put: (gold) Christian Cantwell (USA) 21.83 (silver) Andrei Mikhnevich (BLR) 21.68 (bronze) Ralf Bartels (GER) 21.44
    - Heptathlon: (gold) Bryan Clay (USA) 6204 (silver) Trey Hardee USA 6184 (bronze) Aleksey Drozdov (RUS) 6141
  - Women's events:
    - 400 metres: (gold) Debbie Dunn (USA) 51.04 (silver) Tatyana Firova (RUS) 51.13 (bronze) Vania Stambolova (BUL) 51.50
    - 3000 metres: (gold) Meseret Defar (ETH) 8:51.17 (silver) Vivian Cheruiyot (KEN) 8:51.85 (bronze) Sentayehu Ejigu (ETH) 8:52.08
      - Defar wins the title for the fourth straight time.
    - 60 metres hurdles: (gold) Lolo Jones (USA) 7.72 (silver) Perdita Felicien (CAN) 7.86 (bronze) Priscilla Lopes-Schliep (CAN) 7.87
    - High jump: (gold) Blanka Vlašić (CRO) 2.00 (silver) Ruth Beitia (ESP) 1.98 (bronze) Chaunté Howard Lowe (USA) 1.98
    - Triple jump: (gold) Olga Rypakova (KAZ) 15.14 (silver) Yargelis Savigne (CUB) 14.86 (bronze) Anna Pyatykh (RUS) 14.64
    - Pentathlon: (gold) Jessica Ennis (GBR) 4937 (silver) Nataliya Dobrynska (UKR) 4851 (bronze) Tatyana Chernova (RUS) 4762

==== Auto racing ====
- V8 Supercars:
  - Clipsal 500 in Adelaide, South Australia:
    - Race 5: (1) Garth Tander (AUS) (Holden Commodore) (2) James Courtney (AUS) (Ford Falcon) (3) Lee Holdsworth (AUS) (Holden Commodore)
      - Drivers' standings (after 5 of 26 races): (1) Jamie Whincup (AUS) (Holden Commodore) 720 points (2) Mark Winterbottom (AUS) (Ford Falcon) 585 (3) Courtney 558

==== Basketball ====
- U.S. college conference championship games:
  - Men's (winners advance to the NCAA tournament):
    - America East Conference in Burlington, Vermont:
      - Vermont 83, Boston University 70
    - Big 12 Conference in Kansas City, Missouri:
      - Kansas 72, Kansas State 64
    - Big East Conference in New York City:
      - West Virginia 60, Georgetown 58
    - Big West Conference in Anaheim, California:
      - UC Santa Barbara 69, Long Beach State 64
    - Conference USA in Tulsa, Oklahoma:
      - Houston 81, UTEP 73
    - Mid-American Conference in Cleveland:
      - Ohio 81, Akron 75 (OT)
    - MEAC in Winston-Salem, North Carolina:
      - Morgan State 68, South Carolina State 61
    - Mountain West Conference in Paradise, Nevada:
      - San Diego State 55, UNLV 45
    - Pacific-10 Conference in Los Angeles:
      - Washington 79, California 75
    - Southland Conference in Katy, Texas:
      - Sam Houston State 64, Stephen F. Austin 48
    - SWAC in Bossier City, Louisiana:
      - Arkansas–Pine Bluff 50, Texas Southern 38
    - Western Athletic Conference in Reno, Nevada:
      - New Mexico State 69, Utah State 63
  - Women's (winners advance to the NCAA tournament):
    - America East Conference in West Hartford, Connecticut:
      - Vermont 55, Hartford 50
    - Big Sky Conference in Cheney, Washington:
      - Portland State 62, Montana State 58
    - Big West Conference in Anaheim, California:
      - UC Riverside 71, UC Davis 67
    - Mid-American Conference in Cleveland:
      - Bowling Green 62, Toledo 53
    - MEAC in Winston-Salem, North Carolina:
      - Hampton 57, South Carolina State 48
    - Mountain West Conference in Paradise, Nevada:
      - San Diego State 70, Utah 60 (OT)
    - Patriot League in Bethlehem, Pennsylvania:
      - Lehigh 58, American 42
    - SWAC in Bossier City, Louisiana:
      - Southern 60, Alabama State 47
    - Western Athletic Conference in Reno, Nevada:
      - Louisiana Tech 68, Fresno State 66

==== Biathlon ====
- World Cup 7 in Kontiolahti, Finland:
  - Women's sprint: (gold) Darya Domracheva (BLR) 21:17.5 (0 penalties) (silver) Olga Zaitseva (RUS) 21:25.9 (0) (bronze) Kati Wilhelm (GER) 21:31.0 (0)
    - Overall standings after 19 of 25 events: (1) Magdalena Neuner (GER) 665 points (2) Helena Jonsson (SWE) 655 (3) Andrea Henkel (GER) 618
    - Sprint standings after 8 of 10 events: (1) Jonsson 267 points (2) Wilhelm 267 (3) Neuner 262
  - Men's sprint: (gold) Ivan Tcherezov (RUS) (0 penalties) 24:42.4 (silver) Emil Hegle Svendsen (NOR) (0) 24:49.2 (bronze) Martin Fourcade (FRA) (2) 25:12.5
    - Overall standings after 19 of 25 events: (1) Svendsen 614 points (2) Christoph Sumann (AUT) 604 (3) Evgeny Ustyugov (RUS) 583
    - Sprint standings after 8 of 10 events: (1) Svendsen 294 points (2) Tcherezov 261 (3) Ole Einar Bjørndalen (NOR) 225

==== Boxing ====
- Manny Pacquiao vs. Joshua Clottey in Arlington, Texas: TV bouts:
  - (Philippines) Manny Pacquiao def. (Ghana) Joshua Clottey via unanimous decision to retain the WBO welterweight championship.
  - (Mexico) Humberto Soto def. (Mexico) David Díaz via unanimous decision to retain the WBC lightweight championship..
  - (Mexico) Alfonso Gómez def. (Mexico) José Luis Castillo via technical knockout.
  - (Republic of Ireland) John Duddy def. (Mexico) Michael Medina via split decision.

==== Cricket ====
- Australia in New Zealand:
  - 5th ODI in Wellington:
    - New Zealand 241/9 (50 overs); Australia 190 (46.1 overs). **New Zealand win by 51 runs; Australia win 5–match series 3–2.**
- England in Bangladesh:
  - 1st Test in Chittagong, Day 2:
    - England 599/6d (138.3 overs; Alastair Cook 173, Paul Collingwood 145); Bangladesh 154/5 (39 overs).

==== Cross-country skiing ====
- World Cup in Oslo, Norway:
  - Women's 30 km Freestyle Mass Start: (gold) Marit Bjørgen (NOR) (silver) Kristin Størmer Steira (NOR) (bronze) Therese Johaug (NOR)
    - Overall standings: (1) Justyna Kowalczyk (POL) 1736 points (2) Petra Majdič (SLO) 1191 (3) Aino-Kaisa Saarinen (FIN) 999
    - Distance standings: (1) Kowalczyk 857 points (2) Bjørgen 540 (3) Steira 517
      - Kowalczyk has already secured the overall and distance World Cup titles.
  - Men's 50 km Freestyle Mass Start: (gold) Petter Northug (NOR) (silver) Pietro Piller Cottrer (ITA) (bronze) Vincent Vittoz (FRA)
    - Overall standings: (1) Northug 1285 points (2) Lukáš Bauer (CZE) 902 (3) Dario Cologna (SUI) 735
    - Distance standings: (1) Northug 659 points (2) Bauer 502 (3) Marcus Hellner (SWE) 411

==== Cycling ====
- Paris–Nice:
  - Stage 6: (1) Xavier Tondó (ESP) (Cervélo TestTeam) 5h 01' 39" (2) Alejandro Valverde (ESP) (Caisse d'Epargne) + 5" (3) Peter Sagan (SVK) (Liquigas–Doimo) s.t.
    - General classification: (1) Alberto Contador (Astana) 25h 43' 24" (2) Valverde + 14" (3) Roman Kreuziger (CZE) (Liquigas–Doimo) + 25"

==== Field hockey ====
- Men's World Cup in New Delhi, India:
  - Third place play-off: England 3–4 (bronze) Netherlands
  - Final: (silver) Germany 1–2 (gold) Australia
    - Australia win the title for the second time.

==== Figure skating ====
- World Junior Championships in The Hague, Netherlands:
  - Ladies: (gold) Kanako Murakami (JPN) 165.47 (silver) Agnes Zawadzki (USA) 156.79 (bronze) Polina Agafonova (RUS) 154.27

==== Freestyle skiing ====
- World Cup in Åre, Sweden:
  - Men's dual moguls: (gold) Guilbaut Colas (FRA) (silver) Maxime Gingras (CAN) (bronze) Patrick Deneen (USA)
    - Standings after 11 of 12 events: (1) Dale Begg-Smith (AUS) 613 points (2) Jesper Björnlund (SWE) 541 (3) Colas 515
  - Women's dual moguls: (gold) Hannah Kearney (USA) (silver) Shannon Bahrke (USA) (bronze) Jennifer Heil (CAN)
    - Standings after 11 of 12 events: (1) Heil 725 points (2) Kearney 566 (3) Heather McPhie (USA) 516
      - Heil wins the title with one event remaining.

==== Nordic combined ====
- World Cup in Oslo, Norway:
  - HS134 / 4 x 5 km team: (gold) Norway (silver) Austria (bronze) Germany

==== Rugby union ====
- Six Nations Championship, week 4:
  - Ireland 27–12 Wales in Dublin
  - Scotland 15–15 England in Edinburgh
    - Standings: France 6 points (3 games), Ireland 6 (4), England 5 (4), Italy 2 (3), Wales 2 (4), Scotland 1 (4).
- 2011 Rugby World Cup qualifying:
  - European Nations Cup First Division, matchday 9: (teams in **bold** qualify for 2011 World Cup)
    - Spain 15–33 Portugal in Madrid
    - Romania 22–10 **Georgia** in Bucharest
    - **Russia** 48–11 Germany in Sochi
      - Standings: Georgia, Russia 24 points (9 matches), Portugal 20 (9), Romania 17 (8), Spain 10 (8), Germany 9 (9).

==== Snowboarding ====
- World Cup in Valmalenco, Italy:
  - Men's parallel giant slalom: (gold) Benjamin Karl (AUT) (silver) Rok Flander (SLO) (bronze) Jasey-Jay Anderson (CAN)
    - Overall standings after 25 of 29 events: (1) Karl 6600 points (2) Pierre Vaultier (FRA) 4950 (3) Andreas Prommegger (AUT) 4810
    - Parallel slalom standings after 9 of 10 events: (1) Karl 6600 points (2) Prommegger 4810 (3) Anderson 4250
      - Karl claims the title with one event remaining.
  - Women's parallel giant slalom: (gold) Nicolien Sauerbreij (NED) (silver) Nathalie Desmares (FRA) (bronze) Doris Guenther (AUT)
    - Overall standings after 20 of 24 events: (1) Sauerbreij 4800 points (2) Maëlle Ricker (CAN) 4760 (3) Guenther 4310
    - Parallel slalom standings after 9 of 10 events: (1) Sauerbreij 4800 points (2) Guenther 4310 (3) Fraenzi Maegert-Kohli (SUI) 3800

==== Speed skating ====
- World Cup 7 in Heerenveen, Netherlands:
  - 500 m Men: (gold) Jan Smeekens (NED) (silver) Ronald Mulder (NED) (bronze) Akio Ohta (JPN)
    - Final Standings: (1) Tucker Fredricks (USA) 788 points (2) Smeekens 742 (3) Mika Poutala (FIN) 702
  - 500 m Women: (gold) Jenny Wolf (GER) (silver) Annette Gerritsen (NED) (bronze) Margot Boer (NED)
    - Final Standings: (1) Wolf 1260 points (2) Boer 700 (3) Wang Beixing (CHN) 680
  - 1500 m Women: (gold) Kristina Groves (CAN) (silver) Martina Sáblíková (CZE) (bronze) Brittany Schussler (CAN)
    - Final Standings: (1) Groves 560 points (2) Christine Nesbitt (CAN) 374 (3) Sáblíková 348
  - 5000 m Men: (gold) Håvard Bøkko (NOR) (silver) Sverre Haugli (NOR) (bronze) Ivan Skobrev (RUS)
    - Final Standings: (1) Bøkko 455 points (2) Skobrev 430 (3) Bob de Jong (NED) 416

=== March 12, 2010 (Friday) ===
==== Alpine skiing ====
- Men's World Cup in Garmisch-Partenkirchen, Germany:
  - Giant slalom: (gold) Carlo Janka (SUI) (silver) Davide Simoncelli (ITA) (bronze) Philipp Schörghofer (AUT) (bronze) Ted Ligety (USA)
    - Overall standings after 33 of 34 races: (1) Janka 1197 points (2) Benjamin Raich (AUT) 1091 (3) Didier Cuche (SUI) 952
      - Janka secures the title with one race remaining.
    - Final Giant slalom standings: (1) Ligety 412 points (2) Janka 341 (3) Raich 331
- Women's World Cup in Garmisch-Partenkirchen, Germany:
  - Super-G: (gold) Lindsey Vonn (USA) (silver) Elisabeth Görgl (AUT) (bronze) Nadia Styger (SUI)
    - Overall standings after 31 of 32 races: (1) Vonn 1671 points (2) Maria Riesch (GER) 1456 (3) Anja Pärson (SWE) 1047
      - Vonn becomes the first woman since Petra Kronberger (1990–1992) to win three consecutive overall titles.
    - Final Super G standings: (1) Vonn 620 points (2) Görgl 300 (3) Styger 291

==== Basketball ====
- U.S. college conference championship games:
  - Men's (winner advances to the NCAA tournament):
    - Patriot League in Bethlehem, Pennsylvania:
      - Lehigh 74, Lafayette 59
  - Women's (winners advance to the NCAA tournament):
    - Conference USA in Tulsa, Oklahoma:
      - Tulane 62, UAB 54
    - Southland Conference in Katy, Texas:
      - Lamar 86, Texas A&M–Corpus Christi 59

==== Biathlon ====
- World Cup 7 in Kontiolahti, Finland:
  - Mixed relay: (gold) Ann Kristin Flatland/Tora Berger/Halvard Hanevold/Tarjei Bø (NOR) (1 penalty loop + 8 missed shots) (silver) Kati Wilhelm/Magdalena Neuner/Erik Lesser/Simon Schempp (GER) (0 + 8) (bronze) Katja Haller/Karin Oberhofer/Lukas Hofer/Christian de Lorenzi (ITA) (0 + 9)

==== Cricket ====
- England in Bangladesh:
  - 1st Test in Chittagong, Day 1:
    - England 374/3 (90 overs; Alastair Cook 158*)
- Zimbabwe in West Indies:
  - 4th ODI in Kingstown, St Vincent:
    - Zimbabwe 141 (48.2 overs); West Indies 142/6 (34.3 overs). **West Indies win by 4 wickets; lead 5–match series 3–1.**

==== Cycling ====
- Paris–Nice:
  - Stage 5: (1) Peter Sagan (SVK) (Liquigas–Doimo) 3h 34' 15" (2) Mirco Lorenzetto (ITA) (Lampre–Farnese Vini) + 2" (3) Alejandro Valverde (ESP) (Caisse d'Epargne) s.t.
    - General classification: (1) Alberto Contador (Astana) 20h 41' 40" (2) Valverde + 20" (3) Roman Kreuziger (CZE) (Liquigas–Doimo) + 25"

==== Figure skating ====
- World Junior Championships in The Hague, Netherlands:
  - Ladies – Short program: (1) Anna Ovcharova (RUS) 59.80 (2) Kanako Murakami (JPN) 59.00 (3) Polina Agafonova (RUS) 56.28
  - Ice Dancing: (gold) Elena Ilinykh/Nikita Katsalapov (RUS) 188.28 (silver) Alexandra Paul/Mitchell Islam (CAN) 172.37 (bronze) Ksenia Monko/Kirill Khaliavin (RUS) 168.81

==== Freestyle skiing ====
- World Cup in Grindelwald, Switzerland:
  - Men's skicross: (gold) Audun Grønvold (NOR) (silver) Michael Schmid (SUI) (bronze) Christopher Del Bosco (CAN)
    - Standings after 9 of 11 events: (1) Schmid 615 points (2) Del Bosco 437 (3) Andreas Matt (AUT) 378
  - Women's skicross: (gold) Kelsey Serwa (CAN) (silver) Ashleigh McIvor (CAN) (bronze) Danielle Poleschuk (CAN)
    - Standings after 9 of 11 events: (1) Ophélie David (FRA) 575 points (2) McIvor 537 (3) Serwa 432
- World Cup in Åre, Sweden:
  - Men's moguls: (gold) Jesper Björnlund (SWE) (silver) Patrick Deneen (USA) (bronze) Maxime Gingras (CAN)
    - Standings after 10 of 12 events: (1) Dale Begg-Smith (AUS) 587 points (2) Björnlund 512 (3) Guilbaut Colas (FRA) 415
  - Women's moguls: (gold) Hannah Kearney (USA) (silver) Jennifer Heil (CAN) (bronze) Shannon Bahrke (USA)
    - Standings after 10 of 12 events: (1) Heil 665 points (2) Heather McPhie (USA) 516 (3) Kearney 466

==== Ice hockey ====
- In the longest game in college history, Quinnipiac defeats Union 3–2 in their ECAC Hockey quarterfinal series in the fifth overtime (150:22 in all). (AP via ESPN)

==== Ski jumping ====
- Nordic Tournament:
  - World Cup in Lillehammer, Norway:
    - HS 138: (gold) Simon Ammann (SUI) 274.5 points (135.0m/133.5m) (silver) Gregor Schlierenzauer (AUT) 271.4 (132.0/132.5) (bronze) Adam Małysz (POL) 265.9 (135.5/127.5)
      - World Cup standings after 22 of 23 events: (1) Ammann 1549 points (2) Schlierenzauer 1346 (3) Thomas Morgenstern (AUT) 899
        - Ammann wins the title with one event remaining.
      - Nordic Tournaments standings after 3 of 4 events: (1) Ammann 809.9 points (2) Małysz 774.3 (3) Morgenstern 743.6

==== Snowboarding ====
- World Cup in Valmalenco, Italy:
  - Men's snowboard cross: (gold) Alex Pullin (AUS) (silver) Mario Fuchs (AUT) (bronze) Mateusz Ligocki (POL)
    - Overall standings after 24 of 29 events: (1) Benjamin Karl (AUT) 5600 points (2) Pierre Vaultier (FRA) 4950 (3) Andreas Prommegger (AUT) 4450
    - Snowboard cross standings after 6 of 7 events: (1) Vaultier 4950 points (2) Graham Watanabe (USA) 2570 (3) Pullin 2380
      - Vaultier has already won the title.
  - Women's snowboard cross: (gold) Lindsey Jacobellis (USA) (silver) Maëlle Ricker (CAN) (bronze) Dominique Maltais (CAN)
    - Overall standings after 19 of 24 events: (1) Ricker 4760 points (2) Nicolien Sauerbreij (NED) 3800 (3) Helene Olafsen (NED) 3710 (3) Doris Guenther (AUT) 3710
    - Snowboard cross standings after 6 of 7 events: (1) Ricker 4760 points (2) Olafsen 3710 (3) Maltais 3460
      - Ricker wins the title with one event remaining.

==== Speed skating ====
- World Cup 7 in Heerenveen, Netherlands:
  - 500 m Men: (gold) Jan Smeekens (NED) (silver) Tucker Fredricks (USA) (bronze) Ronald Mulder (NED)
    - Standings after 11 of 12 races: (1) Fredricks 698 points (2) Mika Poutala (FIN) 657 (3) Smeekens 592
  - 500 m Women: (gold) Jenny Wolf (GER) (silver) Margot Boer (NED) (bronze) Annette Gerritsen (NED)
    - Standings after 11 of 12 races: (1) Wolf 1110 points (2) Wang Beixing (CHN) 680 (3) Boer 595
      - Wolf has already secured the title.
  - 1500 m Men: (gold) Shani Davis (USA) (silver) Denny Morrison (CAN) (bronze) Kjeld Nuis (NED)
    - Final Standings: (1) Davis 630 points (2) Håvard Bøkko (NOR) 395 (3) Morrison 338
  - 3000 m Women: (gold) Martina Sáblíková (CZE) (silver) Daniela Anschütz-Thoms (GER) (bronze) Stephanie Beckert (GER)
    - Final Standings: (1) Sáblíková 610 points (2) Beckert 535 (3) Anschütz-Thoms 435

=== March 11, 2010 (Thursday) ===
==== Alpine skiing ====
- Men's World Cup in Garmisch-Partenkirchen, Germany:
  - Super-G: (gold) Erik Guay (CAN) (silver) Ivica Kostelić (CRO) (bronze) Aksel Lund Svindal (NOR)
    - Overall standings after 32 of 34 races: (1) Carlo Janka (SUI) 1097 points (2) Benjamin Raich (AUT) 1059 (3) Didier Cuche (SUI) 907
    - Final Super-G standings: (1) Guay 331 points (2) Michael Walchhofer (AUT) 316 (3) Svindal 314
      - Guay's second win in four days gives him the Super-G title.
- Women's World Cup in Garmisch-Partenkirchen, Germany:
  - Giant slalom: (gold) Tina Maze (SLO) (silver) Kathrin Hölzl (GER) (bronze) Maria Riesch (GER)
    - Overall standings after 30 of 32 races: (1) Lindsey Vonn (USA) 1571 points (2) Riesch 1406 (3) Anja Pärson (SWE) 1002
    - Final Giant slalom standings: (1) Hölzl 471 points (2) Kathrin Zettel (AUT) 394 (3) Maze 372

==== Basketball ====
- Euroleague Top 16, matchday 6 (teams in **bold** advance to the quarterfinals):
  - Group E:
    - Panathinaikos Athens (Greece) 82–79 (Greece) Maroussi Athens
    - **Regal FC Barcelona** (Spain) 82–64 (Serbia) **Partizan Belgrade**
      - Final standings: Regal FC Barcelona 5–1; Partizan Belgrade 3–3; Panathinaikos Athens, Maroussi Athens 2–4.
  - Group F:
    - Montepaschi Siena (Italy) 93–87 (Turkey) Efes Pilsen Istanbul
    - **Real Madrid** (Spain) 64–66 (Israel) **Maccabi Tel Aviv**
      - Final standings: Maccabi Tel Aviv 4–2; Real Madrid, Montepaschi Siena 3–3; Efes Pilsen Istanbul 2–4.
  - Group G:
    - **Asseco Prokom Gdynia** (Poland) 63–82 (Spain) Unicaja Málaga
      - Final standings: **CSKA Moscow** 5–1; Asseco Prokom Gdynia 3–3; Unicaja Málaga, Žalgiris Kaunas 2–4.
  - Group H:
    - Khimki Moscow Region (Russia) 96–83 (Greece) **Olympiacos Piraeus**
    - **Caja Laboral Baskonia** (Spain) 102–90 (OT) (Croatia) Cibona Zagreb
      - Final standings: Olympiacos Piraeus 5–1; Caja Laboral Baskonia, Khimki Moscow Region 3–3; Cibona Zagreb 1–5.

==== Cricket ====
- Australia in New Zealand:
  - 4th ODI in Auckland:
    - New Zealand 238 (44.1 overs); Australia 202/4 (31.1/34 overs). **Australia win by 6 wickets (D/L); lead 5–match series 3–1.**

==== Cross-country skiing ====
- World Cup in Drammen, Norway:
  - Women's Sprint Classic: (gold) Marit Bjørgen (NOR) (silver) Aino-Kaisa Saarinen (FIN) (bronze) Pirjo Muranen (FIN)
    - Overall standings: (1) Justyna Kowalczyk (POL) 1736 points (2) Petra Majdič (SLO) 1191 (3) Saarinen 990
    - Sprint standings: (1) Kowalczyk 479 points (2) Majdič 446 (3) Saarinen 375
  - Men's Sprint Classic: (gold) Emil Jönsson (SWE) (silver) Petter Northug (NOR) (bronze) Andrew Newell (USA)
    - Overall standings: (1) Northug 1140 points (2) Lukáš Bauer (CZE) 888 (3) Dario Cologna (SUI) 735
    - Sprint standings: (1) Jönsson 427 points (2) Northug 306 (3) John Kristian Dahl (NOR) 280

==== Cycling ====
- Paris–Nice:
  - Stage 4: (1) Alberto Contador (ESP) (Astana) 4h 26' 47" (2) Alejandro Valverde (ESP) (Caisse d'Epargne) + 10" (3) Samuel Sánchez (ESP) (Euskaltel–Euskadi) s.t.
    - General classification: (1) Contador 17h 07' 23" (2) Valverde + 24" (3) Roman Kreuziger (CZE) (Liquigas–Doimo) + 25"

==== Darts ====
- Premier League round 5 in Manchester, England:
  - James Wade (ENG) 7–7 Ronnie Baxter (ENG)
  - Phil Taylor (ENG) 7–7 Mervyn King (ENG)
  - Terry Jenkins (ENG) 4–8 Raymond van Barneveld (NED)
  - Adrian Lewis (ENG) 4–8 Simon Whitlock (AUS)
    - Highest checkout: Phil Taylor 161
      - Standings (after five rounds): Taylor 9 points, King 7, Baxter 6, Whitlock 5, Jenkins, van Barneveld 4, Lewis 3, Wade 2.

==== Field hockey ====
- Men's World Cup in New Delhi, India:
  - Semi-finals:
    - **Germany** 4–1 England
    - **Australia** 2–1 Netherlands

==== Figure skating ====
- World Junior Championships in The Hague, Netherlands:
  - Ice Dancing – standings after Original Dance: (1) Elena Ilinykh/Nikita Katsalapov (RUS) 97.46 (2) Alexandra Paul/Mitchell Islam (CAN) 89.22 (3) Ksenia Monko/Kirill Khaliavin (RUS) 87.72
  - Men: (gold) Yuzuru Hanyu (JPN) 216.10 (silver) Song Nan (CHN) 205.25 (bronze) Artur Gachinski (RUS) 199.19

==== Football (soccer) ====
- UEFA Europa League Round of 16, first leg:
  - Hamburg (Germany) 3–1 (Belgium) Anderlecht
  - Rubin Kazan (Russia) 1–1 (Germany) Wolfsburg
  - Atlético Madrid (Spain) 0–0 (Portugal) Sporting CP
  - Lille (France) 1–0 (England) Liverpool
  - Benfica (Portugal) 1–1 (France) Marseille
  - Panathinaikos (Greece) 1–3 (Belgium) Standard Liège
  - Juventus (Italy) 3–1 (England) Fulham
  - Valencia (Spain) 1–1 (Germany) Werder Bremen
- Copa Libertadores second stage:
  - Group 2: Nacional (Paraguay) 0–2 (Brazil) São Paulo
    - Standings (after 3 matches): Once Caldas 7 points, São Paulo 6, Monterrey 4, Nacional 0.
  - Group 5:
    - Emelec (Ecuador) 1–2 (Uruguay) Cerro
    - Deportivo Quito (Ecuador) 1–1 (Brazil) Internacional
      - Standings (after 2 matches): Cerro 6 points, Internacional 4, Deportivo Quito 1, Emelec 0.
  - Group 7: Deportivo Italia (Venezuela) 2–2 (Brazil) Cruzeiro
    - Standings: Vélez Sársfield 6 points (2 matches), Cruzeiro 4 (3), Colo-Colo 3 (2), Deportivo Italia 1 (3).
- CONCACAF Champions League quarterfinals, first leg:
  - Árabe Unido (Panama) 0–1 (Mexico) Cruz Azul

==== Freestyle skiing ====
- World Cup in Grindelwald, Switzerland: Both Skicross events were postponed due to bad weather.

=== March 10, 2010 (Wednesday) ===
==== Alpine skiing ====
- Men's World Cup in Garmisch-Partenkirchen, Germany:
  - Downhill: (gold) Carlo Janka (SUI) (silver) Mario Scheiber (AUT) (bronze) Erik Guay (CAN) (bronze) Patrick Küng (SUI)
    - Overall standings after 31 of 34 races: (1) Janka 1073 points (2) Benjamin Raich (AUT) 1019 (3) Didier Cuche (SUI) 878
    - Final Downhill standings: (1) Cuche 528 points (2) Janka 448 (3) Werner Heel (ITA) 292
- Women's World Cup in Garmisch-Partenkirchen, Germany:
  - Downhill: (gold) Maria Riesch (GER) (silver) Lindsey Vonn (USA) (bronze) Anja Pärson (SWE)
    - Overall standings after 29 of 32 races: (1) Vonn 1571 points (2) Riesch 1346 (3) Pärson 982
    - Final Downhill standings: (1) Vonn 725 points (2) Riesch 556 (3) Pärson 385

==== Basketball ====
- Euroleague Top 16, matchday 6: (teams in **bold** advance to the quarterfinals, teams in ~~strike~~ are eliminated)
  - Group G: **CSKA Moscow** (Russia) 84–71 (Lithuania) ~~Žalgiris Kaunas~~
    - Standings: CSKA Moscow 5–1, **Asseco Prokom Gdynia** 3–2, Žalgiris 2–4, ~~Unicaja Málaga~~ 1–4.
- U.S. college conference championship games:
  - Men's (winners advance to the NCAA tournament):
    - Big Sky Conference in Ogden, Utah:
      - Montana 66, Weber State 65
    - Northeast Conference in Hamden, Connecticut:
      - Robert Morris 52, Quinnipiac 50

==== Cricket ====
- Zimbabwe in West Indies:
  - 3rd ODI in Kingstown, St Vincent:
    - West Indies 245/9 (50 overs); Zimbabwe 104 (31.5 overs). **West Indies win by 141 runs; lead 5–match series 2–1.**

==== Cycling ====
- Paris–Nice:
  - Stage 3: (1) Peter Sagan (SVK) (Liquigas–Doimo) 3h 44' 28" (2) Joaquim Rodríguez (ESP) (Team Katusha) s.t. (3) Nicolas Roche (IRL) (Ag2r–La Mondiale) s.t.
    - General classification: (1) Jens Voigt (GER) (Team Saxo Bank) 12h 40' 26" (2) Sagan + 6" (3) Luis León Sánchez (ESP) (Caisse d'Epargne) + 9"

==== Figure skating ====
- World Junior Championships in The Hague, Netherlands:
  - Men – Short program: (1) Grant Hochstein (USA) 71.35 (2) Keegan Messing (USA) 68.90 (3) Yuzuru Hanyu (JPN) 68.75
  - Pairs: (gold) Sui Wenjing/Han Cong (CHN) 170.71 (silver) Narumi Takahashi/Mervin Tran (JPN) 157.23 (bronze) Ksenia Stolbova/Fedor Klimov (RUS) 145.35

==== Football (soccer) ====
- UEFA Champions League First knockout stage, second leg: (first leg score in parentheses)
  - Real Madrid (Spain) 1–1 (0–1) (France) **Lyon**. Lyon win 2–1 on aggregate.
  - **Manchester United** (England) 4–0 (3–2) (Italy) Milan. Manchester United win 7–2 on aggregate.
- UEFA Women's Champions League quarter-finals, first leg:
  - Duisburg (Germany) 2–1 (England) Arsenal
  - Umeå (Sweden) 0–0 (France) Montpellier
  - Lyon (France) 3–0 (Italy) Torres
  - Turbine Potsdam (Germany) 5–0 (Norway) Røa
- Copa Libertadores second stage:
  - Group 1: Independiente Medellín (Colombia) 1–1 (Brazil) Corinthians
    - Standings (after 2 matches): Corinthians 4 points, Racing 3, Independiente Medellín 2, Cerro Porteño 1.
  - Group 2: Once Caldas (Colombia) 1–1 (Mexico) Monterrey
    - Standings: Once Caldas 7 points (3 matches), Monterrey 4 (3), São Paulo FC 3 (2), Club Nacional 0 (2).
  - Group 3: Alianza Lima (Peru) 2–0 (Peru) Juan Aurich
    - Standings (after 3 matches): Alianza Lima 9 points, Estudiantes de La Plata 4, Juan Aurich 3, Bolívar 1.
  - Group 6: Nacional (Uruguay) 2–2 (Argentina) Banfield
    - Standings (after 3 matches): Banfield 7 points, Nacional 5, Club Deportivo Cuenca 3, Monarcas Morelia 1.
  - Group 8: Caracas (Venezuela) 1–3 (Brazil) Flamengo
    - Standings (after 2 matches): Flamengo 6 points, Universidad de Chile 4, Universidad Católica 1, Caracas 0.
- AFC Champions League, Round 2:
  - Group C:
    - Sepahan (Iran) 0–0 (United Arab Emirates) Al-Ain
    - Pakhtakor Tashkent (Uzbekistan) 1–3 (Saudi Arabia) Al-Shabab
      - Standings (after 2 matches): Al-Shabab 4 points, Pakhtakor Tashkent 3, Sepahan 2, Al-Ain 1.
  - Group D:
    - Al-Ahli (United Arab Emirates) 0–5 (Qatar) Al-Sadd
    - Al-Hilal (Saudi Arabia) 3–1 (Iran) Mes Kerman
      - Standings (after 2 matches), Al-Hilal 6 points, Al-Sadd, Mes Kerman 3, Al-Ahli 0.
  - Group G:
    - Gamba Osaka (Japan) 1–1 (China) Henan Construction
    - Singapore Armed Forces 0–2 (South Korea) Suwon Samsung Bluewings
      - Standings (after 2 matches): Suwon Samsung Bluewings 4 points, Gamba Osaka, Henan Construction 2, Singapore Armed Forces 1.
  - Group H:
    - Shandong Luneng (China) 0–2 (Australia) Adelaide United
    - Pohang Steelers (South Korea) 2–1 (Japan) Sanfrecce Hiroshima
      - Standings (after 2 matches): Adelaide United 6 points, Pohang Steelers, Shandong Luneng 3, Sanfrecce Hiroshima 0.
- AFC Cup, Round 1:
  - Group D: Kingfisher East Bengal (India) 1–4 (Syria) Al-Ittihad
- CONCACAF Champions League quarterfinals, first leg:
  - Marathón (Honduras) 2–0 (Mexico) UNAM
  - Comunicaciones (Guatemala) 1–1 (Mexico) Pachuca

=== March 9, 2010 (Tuesday) ===
==== Basketball ====
- ULEB Eurocup Last 16, matchday 6: (teams in **bold** advance to the quarterfinals):
  - Group I:
    - Le Mans (France) 79–75 (Greece) **Aris BSA 2003**
    - DKV Joventut (Spain) 62–68 (Germany) **ALBA Berlin**
      - Final standings: ALBA Berlin 4–2, Aris BSA 2003, DKV Joventut 3–3, Le Mans 2–4.
  - Group J:
    - Galatasaray Café Crown (Turkey) 98–111 (Israel) **Hapoel Jerusalem**
      - Hapoel score 44 points in the final quarter, a record for any quarter in the competition's history.
    - **Power Elec Valencia** (Spain) 91–81 (Russia) UNICS Kazan
      - Final standings: Power Elec Valencia 5–1, Hapoel Jerusalem 4–2, UNICS Kazan 3–3, Galatasaray Café Crown 0–6.
  - Group K:
    - Benetton Basket (Italy) 86–70 (Germany) Brose Baskets
    - **Panellinios BC** (Greece) 77–70 (Spain) **Bizkaia Bilbao Basket**
      - Final standings: Bizkaia Bilbao Basket, Panellinios BC 4–2, Benetton Basket, Brose Baskets 2–4
  - Group L:
    - **Gran Canaria 2014** (Spain) 81–58 (Serbia) Crvena zvezda
    - **ČEZ Nymburk** (Czech Republic) 84–94 (Turkey) Türk Telekom
      - Final standings: Gran Canaria 2014 4–2, ČEZ Nymburk, Crvena zvezda 3–3, Türk Telekom 2–4.
- U.S. college conference championship games:
  - Men's (winners advance to the NCAA tournament):
    - Horizon League in Indianapolis:
      - Butler 70, Wright State 45
    - The Summit League in Sioux Falls, South Dakota:
      - Oakland 76, IUPUI 64
    - Sun Belt Conference in Hot Springs, Arkansas:
      - North Texas 66, Troy 63
  - Women's (winners advance to the NCAA tournament):
    - Big East Conference in Hartford, Connecticut:
      - Connecticut 60, West Virginia 32
    - The Summit League in Sioux Falls, South Dakota:
      - South Dakota State 79, Oral Roberts 75 (OT)
    - Sun Belt Conference in Hot Springs, Arkansas:
      - Middle Tennessee 70, UALR 68 (OT)

==== Cricket ====
- Australia in New Zealand:
  - 3rd ODI in Hamilton:
    - New Zealand 245 (46.2 overs); Australia 248/4 (47.2 overs; BJ Haddin 110). **Australia win by 6 wickets; lead 5–match series 2–1.**

==== Cycling ====
- Paris–Nice:
  - Stage 2: (1) William Bonnet (FRA) (Bbox Bouygues Telecom) 4h 22'40" (2) Peter Sagan (SVK) (Liquigas–Doimo) s.t. (3) Luis León Sánchez (ESP) (Caisse d'Epargne) s.t.
    - General classification: (1) Lars Boom (NED) (Rabobank) 8h 55' 51" (2) Jens Voigt (GER) (Team Saxo Bank) + 5" (3) Sánchez + 10"

==== Field hockey ====
- Men's World Cup in New Delhi, India: (teams in **bold** advance to semifinals)
  - Pool A:
    - **Germany** 5–2 New Zealand
    - **Netherlands** 1–2 South Korea
    - Canada 2–4 Argentina
      - Final standings: Germany 11 points, Netherlands, Korea 10, Argentina, New Zealand 6, Canada 0.

==== Figure skating ====
- World Junior Championships in The Hague, Netherlands:
  - Ice Dancing – Compulsory Dance: (1) Elena Ilinykh/Nikita Katsalapov (RUS) 37.52 (2) Maia Shibutani/Alex Shibutani (USA) 34.27 (3) Ekaterina Pushkash/Jonathan Guerreiro (RUS) 34.20
  - Pairs – Short Program: (1) Sui Wenjing/Han Cong (CHN) 60.94 (2) Narumi Takahashi/Mervin Tran (JPN) 59.54 (3) Ksenia Stolbova/Fedor Klimov (RUS) 54.26

==== Football (soccer) ====
- UEFA Champions League First knockout stage, second leg: (first leg score in parentheses)
  - **Arsenal** (England) 5–0 (1–2) (Portugal) Porto. Arsenal win 6–2 on aggregate.
  - Fiorentina (Italy) 3–2 (1–2) (Germany) **Bayern Munich**. 4–4 on aggregate, Bayern Munich win on away goals.
- Copa Libertadores second stage:
  - Group 1: Racing (Uruguay) 2–1 (Paraguay) Cerro Porteño
    - Standings: Corinthians 3 points (1 match), Racing 3 (2), Independiente Medellín 1 (1), Cerro Porteño 1 (2).
  - Group 3: Bolívar (Bolivia) 0–0 (Argentina) Estudiantes
    - Standings: Alianza Lima 6 points (2 matches), Estudiantes 4 (3), Juan Aurich 3 (2), Bolívar 1 (3).
  - Group 6: Deportivo Cuenca (Ecuador) 2–0 (Mexico) Morelia
    - Standings: Banfield 6 points (2 matches), Nacional 4 (2), Deportivo Cuenca 3 (3), Morelia 1 (3).
  - Group 8: Universidad Católica 2–2 Universidad de Chile
    - Standings: Universidad de Chile 4 points (2 matches), Flamengo 3 (1), Universidad Católica 1 (2), Caracas 0.
- AFC Champions League, Round 2:
  - Group A:
    - Esteghlal (Iran) 0–0 (United Arab Emirates) Al-Jazira
    - Al-Gharafa (Qatar) 3–2 (Saudi Arabia) Al-Ahli
      - Standings (after 2 matches): Al-Gharafa 6 points, Esteghlal 4, Al-Jazira 1, Al-Ahli 0.
  - Group B:
    - Al-Wahda (United Arab Emirates) 1–2 (Uzbekistan) Bunyodkor
    - Al-Ittihad (Saudi Arabia) 2–2 (Iran) Zob Ahan
      - Standings (after 2 matches): Bunyodkor 6 points, Zob Ahan 4, Al-Ittihad 1, Al-Wahda0.
  - Group E:
    - Melbourne Victory (Australia) 0–2 (South Korea) Seongnam Ilhwa Chunma
    - Kawasaki Frontale (Japan) 1–3 (China) Beijing Guoan
      - Standings (after 2 matches): Seongnam Ilhwa Chunma, Beijing Guoan 6 points, Melbourne Victory, Kawasaki Frontale 0.
  - Group F:
    - Jeonbuk Hyundai Motors (South Korea) 1–2 (Japan) Kashima Antlers
    - Changchun Yatai (China) 9–0 (Indonesia) Persipura Jayapura
      - Standings (after 2 matches): Kashima Antlers 6 points, Changchun Yatai, Jeonbuk Hyundai Motors 3, Persipura Jayapura 0.
- CONCACAF Champions League quarterfinals, first leg:
  - Columbus Crew (United States) 2–2 (Mexico) Toluca

==== Ski jumping ====
- Nordic Tournament:
  - World Cup in Kuopio, Finland:
    - HS 127: (gold) Simon Ammann (SUI) 251.0 points (128.5m/126.0m) (silver) Adam Małysz (POL) 234.1 (123.0/123.5) (bronze) Anders Jacobsen (NOR) 233.9 (121.0/126.5)
      - World Cup standings after 21 of 23 events: (1) Ammann 1449 points (2) Gregor Schlierenzauer (AUT) 1266 (3) Thomas Morgenstern (AUT) 854
      - Nordic Tournaments standings after 2 of 4 events: (1) Ammann 535.4 points (2) Małysz 508.4 (3) Morgenstern 491.8

=== March 8, 2010 (Monday) ===
==== Basketball ====
- U.S. college conference championship games:
  - Men's (winners advance to the NCAA tournament):
    - CAA in Richmond, Virginia:
      - Old Dominion 60, William & Mary 53
    - MAAC in Albany, New York:
      - Siena 72, Fairfield 65 (OT)
    - Southern Conference in Charlotte, North Carolina:
      - Wofford 56, Appalachian State 51
    - West Coast Conference in Paradise, Nevada:
      - Saint Mary's 81, Gonzaga 62
  - Women's (winners advance to the NCAA tournament):
    - Atlantic 10 Conference in Upper Marlboro, Maryland:
      - Xavier 57, Temple 55 (OT)
    - Southern Conference in Charlotte, North Carolina:
      - Chattanooga 72, Samford 67
    - West Coast Conference in Paradise, Nevada:
      - Gonzaga 76, Pepperdine 48
- In another women's game:
  - Top-ranked Connecticut breaks their own NCAA record winning streak, defeating Notre Dame 59–44 in the Big East tournament semifinals for their 71st straight win.

==== Cycling ====
- Paris–Nice:
  - Stage 1: (1) Greg Henderson (NZL) (Team Sky) 4h 22'17" (2) Grega Bole (SLO) (Lampre–Farnese Vini) s.t. (3) Jérémie Galland (FRA) (Saur–Sojasun) s.t.
    - General classification: (1) Lars Boom (NED) (Rabobank) 4h 33' 11" (2) Jens Voigt (GER) (Team Saxo Bank) + 5" (3) David Millar (GBR) (Garmin–Transitions) + 13"

==== Field hockey ====
- Men's World Cup in New Delhi, India: (teams in **bold** advance to the semifinals)
  - Pool B:
    - Spain 2–0 **England**
    - **Australia** 2–1 Pakistan
    - India 3–3 South Africa
      - Final standings: Australia, England 12 points, Spain 9, India, South Africa 4, Pakistan 3.

==== Rugby union ====
- The Celtic League, currently operating in Ireland, Scotland and Wales, announces that two Italian teams will enter the competition from 2010 to 2011 onward. (ESPN Scrum.com)

==== Tennis ====
- Davis Cup: (team in **bold** advance to quarterfinals)
  - World Group first round, day 3:
    - **Chile** 4–1 Israel
      - Fernando González (CHI) def. Dudi Sela (ISR) 6–4, 6–4, 6–3
      - Jorge Aguilar (CHI) def. Harel Levy (ISR) 7–6(3), 6–1

=== March 7, 2010 (Sunday) ===
==== Alpine skiing ====
- Men's World Cup in Kvitfjell, Norway:
  - Super-G: (gold) Erik Guay (CAN) (silver) Hannes Reichelt (AUT) (bronze) Aksel Lund Svindal (NOR) (bronze) Tobias Grünenfelder (SUI)
    - Overall standings after 30 of 34 races: (1) Benjamin Raich (AUT) 1019 points (2) Carlo Janka (SUI) 973 (3) Didier Cuche (SUI) 846
    - Super-G standings after 5 of 6 races: (1) Michael Walchhofer (AUT) 300 points (2) Svindal 254 (3) Guay 231
- Women's World Cup in Crans-Montana, Switzerland:
  - Super-G: (gold) Dominique Gisin (SUI) (silver) Lindsey Vonn (USA) (bronze) Julia Mancuso (USA)
    - Overall standings after 28 of 32 races: (1) Vonn 1491 points (2) Maria Riesch (GER) 1246 (3) Anja Pärson (SWE) 922
    - Super G standings after 6 of 7 races: (1) Vonn 520 points (2) Andrea Fischbacher (AUT) 239 (3) Fabienne Suter (SUI) 234
      - Vonn has already won the Super-G title.

==== Auto racing ====
- NASCAR Sprint Cup Series:
  - Kobalt Tools 500 in Hampton, Georgia:
    - (1) (Nevada) Kurt Busch (Dodge, Penske Racing) (2) (Wisconsin) Matt Kenseth (Ford, Roush Fenway Racing) (3) (Colombia) Juan Pablo Montoya (Chevrolet, Earnhardt Ganassi Racing)
      - Drivers' standings (after 4 of 36 races): (1) (California) Kevin Harvick (Chevrolet, Richard Childress Racing) 644 points (2) Kenseth 618 (3) (Washington (state)) Greg Biffle (Ford, Roush Fenway Racing) 585
- World Touring Car Championship
  - Race of Brazil in Curitiba, Brazil:
    - Race 1: (1) Yvan Muller (FRA) (Chevrolet) (2) Robert Huff (GBR) (Chevrolet) (3) Alain Menu (SUI) (Chevrolet)
    - Race 2: (1) Gabriele Tarquini (ITA) (SR-Sport) (2) Jordi Gené (ESP) (SR-Sport) (3) Menu
      - Standings (after 2 of 24 races): (1) Tarquini 37 points (1) Muller 37 (3) Menu 30.
- World Rally Championship:
  - Rally Mexico in León, Guanajuato:
    - (1) Sébastien Loeb (FRA)/Daniel Elena (MON) (Citroën C4 WRC) (2) Petter Solberg (NOR)/Phil Mills (GBR) (Citroën C4 WRC) (3) Sébastien Ogier (FRA)/Julien Ingrassia (FRA) (Citroën C4 WRC)
      - Standings (after 2 of 13 events): (1) Loeb/Elena 43 points (2) Mikko Hirvonen (FIN)/Jarmo Lehtinen (FIN) (Ford Focus RS WRC 09) 37 (3) Ogier/Ingrassia 25 (3) Jari-Matti Latvala (FIN)/Miikka Anttila (FIN) (Ford Focus RS WRC 09) 25

==== Basketball ====
- U.S. college conference championship games:
  - Men's (winner advances to the NCAA tournament):
    - Missouri Valley Conference in St. Louis:
      - Northern Iowa 67, Wichita State 52
  - Women's (winners advance to the NCAA tournament):
    - Atlantic Coast Conference in Greensboro, North Carolina:
      - Duke 70, North Carolina State 60
    - Big Ten Conference in Indianapolis:
      - Ohio State 66, Iowa 64
    - MAAC in Albany, New York:
      - Marist 66, Fairfield 49
    - Southeastern Conference in Duluth, Georgia:
      - Tennessee 70, Kentucky 62
- In another women's game:
  - Top-ranked Connecticut crushes Syracuse 77–41 in the quarterfinals of the Big East tournament, tying their own NCAA record for consecutive wins at 70.

==== Cross-country skiing ====
- World Cup in Lahti, Finland:
  - Men's 4 x 10 km Relay: (gold) Norway II (Simen Østensen/Roger Aa Djupvik/Sjur Røthe/Kristian Tettli Rennemo) (silver) Norway I (Eldar Rønning/Martin Johnsrud Sundby/Petter Eliassen/Tord Asle Gjerdalen) (bronze) Germany (Hannes Dotzler/Tobias Angerer/Philipp Marschall/Tim Tscharnke)
    - Standings (men): (1) Norway 3634 (2) Russia 3382 (3) Sweden 2324
  - Women's 4 x 5 km Relay: (gold) Norway I (Marthe Kristoffersen/Therese Johaug/Kristin Størmer Steira/Marit Bjørgen) (silver) Germany (Nicole Fessel/Katrin Zeller/Miriam Gössner/Evi Sachenbacher-Stehle) (bronze) Italy (Marianna Longa/Antonella Confortola Wyatt/Sabina Valbusa/Arianna Follis)
    - Standings (women): (1) Russia 3031 (2) Norway 2887 (3) Finland 2409
      - Standings (overall): (1) Norway 6521 (2) Russia 6413 (3) Sweden 4503

==== Cycling ====
- Paris–Nice:
  - Prologue: (1) Lars Boom (NED) (Rabobank) 10'56" (2) Jens Voigt (GER) (Team Saxo Bank) + 3" (3) Levi Leipheimer (USA) (Team RadioShack) + 6"

==== Field hockey ====
- Men's World Cup in New Delhi, India: (teams in ~~strike~~ are eliminated)
  - Pool A:
    - South Korea 9–2 ~~Canada~~
    - New Zealand 0–1 ~~Argentina~~
    - Germany 2–2 Netherlands
      - Standings (after 4 matches): Netherlands 10 points, Germany 8, Korea 7, New Zealand 6, Argentina 3, Canada 0.

==== Football (soccer) ====
- OFC Champions League Group stage, Matchday 5: (teams in ~~strike~~ are eliminated)
  - Group B: Lautoka F.C. (Fiji) 0–1 (Papua New Guinea) PRK Hekari United
    - Standings (after 5 matches): PRK Hekari United 10 points, Lautoka F.C. 9, Tafea FC 8, ~~Marist FC~~ 1.

==== Freestyle skiing ====
- World Cup in Inawashiro, Japan:
  - Men's dual moguls: Postponed due to fog.
  - Women's dual moguls: (gold) Aiko Uemura (JPN) (silver) Jennifer Heil (CAN) (bronze) Shannon Bahrke (USA)
    - Standings after 8 of 12 events: (1) Heil 585 points (2) Heather McPhie (USA) 466 (3) Uemura 377

==== Golf ====
- PGA Tour:
  - Honda Classic in Palm Beach Gardens, Florida:
    - Winner: Camilo Villegas (COL) 267 (−13)
      - Villegas wins his third PGA Tour title.
- European Tour:
  - Malaysian Open in Kuala Lumpur, Malaysia:
    - Winner: Noh Seung-yul (KOR) 274 (−14)
      - Noh wins his first European Tour and second Asian Tour title.
- Champions Tour:
  - Toshiba Classic in Newport Beach, California:
    - Winner: Fred Couples (USA) 195 (−18)
      - Couples wins his second Champions Tour title in his third career start.

==== Ski jumping ====
- Nordic Tournament:
  - World Cup in Lahti, Finland:
    - HS 130: (gold) Simon Ammann (SUI) 284.4 points (128.0m/131.0m) (silver) Adam Małysz (POL) 274.3 (126.0/130.0) (bronze) Thomas Morgenstern (AUT) 272.4 (124.0/127.0)
      - Standings after 20 of 23 events: (1) Ammann 1349 points (2) Gregor Schlierenzauer (AUT) 1242 (3) Morgenstern 809

==== Speed skating ====
- World Cup 6 in Erfurt, Germany:
  - 500 m Men: (gold) Jan Smeekens (NED) (silver) Yuya Oikawa (JPN) (bronze) Mika Poutala (FIN) (bronze) Dmitry Lobkov (RUS)
    - Standings after 10 of 12 races: (1) Poutala 621 points (2) Tucker Fredricks (USA) 578 (3) Lee Kang-seok (KOR) 523
  - 500 m Women: (gold) Jenny Wolf (GER) (silver) Margot Boer (NED) (bronze) Thijsje Oenema (NED)
    - Standings after 10 of 12 races: (1) Wolf 960 points (2) Wang Beixing (CHN) 680 (3) Lee Sang-hwa (KOR) 505
      - Wolf secures the title.
  - 1000 m Men: (gold) Shani Davis (USA) (silver) Stefan Groothuis (NED) (bronze) Mark Tuitert (NED)
    - Standings after 6 of 7 races: (1) Davis 600 points (2) Tuitert 320 (3) Denny Morrison (CAN) 247
      - Davis has already won the title.
  - 1000 m Women: (gold) Yekaterina Shikhova (RUS) (silver) Laurine van Riessen (NED) (bronze) Natasja Bruintjes (NED)
    - Standings after 6 of 7 races: (1) Christine Nesbitt (CAN) 432 points (2) Monique Angermüller (GER) 315 (3) Margot Boer (NED) 305

==== Tennis ====
- WTA Tour:
  - Monterrey Open in Monterrey, Mexico:
    - Final: Anastasia Pavlyuchenkova (RUS) def. Daniela Hantuchová (SVK) 1–6, 6–1, 6–0
      - Pavlyuchenkova wins her first career title.
- Davis Cup: (teams in **bold** advance to quarterfinals)
  - World Group first round, day 3:
    - **Spain** 4–1 Switzerland
      - David Ferrer (ESP) def. Stanislas Wawrinka (SUI) 6–2, 6–4, 6–0
      - Nicolás Almagro (ESP) def. Marco Chiudinelli (SUI) 6–1, 6–3
    - **France** 4–1 Germany
      - Simon Greul (GER) def. Jo-Wilfried Tsonga (FRA) 4–6, 6–2, 1–0 retired
      - Julien Benneteau (FRA) def. Benjamin Becker (GER) 6–2, 7–5
    - **Russia** 3–2 India
      - Mikhail Youzhny (RUS) def. Somdev Devvarman (IND) 6–2, 6–1, 6–3
      - Rohan Bopanna (IND) def. Teymuraz Gabashvili (RUS) 7–6(5), 6–4
    - Sweden 2–3 **Argentina**
      - Robin Söderling (SWE) def. Leonardo Mayer (ARG) 7–5, 7–6(5), 7–5
      - David Nalbandian (ARG) def. Andreas Vinciguerra (SWE) 7–5, 6–3, 4–6, 6–4
    - **Croatia** 5–0 Ecuador
      - Antonio Veić (CRO) def. Júlio César Campozano (ECU) 6–4, 7–6(4)
      - Ivan Dodig (CRO) def. Iván Endara (ECU) 6–1, 6–3
    - **Serbia** 3–2 United States
      - Novak Djokovic (SRB) def. John Isner (USA) 7–5, 3–6, 6–3, 6–7(5), 6–4
      - Sam Querrey (USA) def. Viktor Troicki (SRB) 7–5, 6–2
        - Serbia qualify for the Davis Cup quarter-finals for the first time.
    - Belgium 1–4 **Czech Republic**
      - Steve Darcis (BEL) def. Jan Hájek (CZE) 7–6(6), 1–6, 6–4
      - Lukáš Dlouhý (CZE) def. Christophe Rochus (BEL) 1–6, 7–6(6), 7–5
  - World Group first round, day 2:
    - Chile 2–1 Israel
      - Jonathan Erlich/Andy Ram (ISR) def. Jorge Aguilar/Paul Capdeville (CHI) 6–7(5), 7–6(9), 2–6, 6–1, 6–0

=== March 6, 2010 (Saturday) ===
==== Alpine skiing ====
- Men's World Cup in Kvitfjell, Norway:
  - Downhill: (gold) Didier Cuche (SUI) (silver) Aksel Lund Svindal (NOR) (bronze) Klaus Kröll (AUT)
    - Overall standings after 29 of 34 races: (1) Benjamin Raich (AUT) 1007 points (2) Carlo Janka (SUI) 937 (3) Cuche 846
    - Downhill standings after 7 of 8 races: (1) Cuche 496 points (2) Janka 348 (3) Werner Heel (ITA) 252
      - Cuche wins his third World Cup Downhill title in four seasons.
- Women's World Cup in Crans-Montana, Switzerland:
  - Downhill: (gold) Lindsey Vonn (USA) (silver) Johanna Schnarf (ITA) (bronze) Marianne Abderhalden (SUI)
    - Overall standings after 27 of 32 races: (1) Vonn 1411 points (2) Maria Riesch (GER) 1214 (3) Anja Pärson (SWE) 886
    - Downhill standings after 7 of 8 races: (1) Vonn 645 points (2) Riesch 456 (3) Pärson 325
      - Vonn wins her third World Cup discipline title of the season, after the Super-G and Combined titles.

==== Basketball ====
- U.S. college conference championship games:
  - Men's (winners advance to the NCAA tournament):
    - Big South Conference in Conway, South Carolina:
      - Winthrop 64, Coastal Carolina 53
    - Atlantic Sun Conference in Macon, Georgia:
      - ETSU 72, Mercer 66
    - Ohio Valley Conference in Nashville:
      - Murray State 62, Morehead State 51
  - Women's (winners advance to the NCAA tournament):
    - Atlantic Sun Conference in Macon, Georgia:
      - ETSU 63, North Florida 62
    - Ohio Valley Conference in Nashville:
      - Austin Peay 69, Eastern Illinois 60
- In another men's college game:
  - In their last game at Freedom Hall before moving into a new arena next season, Louisville stuns top-ranked Syracuse 78–68.
- In another women's college game:
  - Princeton defeats Harvard 78–66 to clinch the Ivy League title and secure its bid to the NCAA tournament.

==== Cricket ====
- Australia in New Zealand:
  - 2nd ODI in Auckland:
    - Australia 273/7 (50 overs); New Zealand 253 (43.2/45 overs). **Australia win by 12 runs (D/L), 5–match series level at 1–1.**
- Zimbabwe in West Indies:
  - 2nd ODI in Providence, Guyana:
    - Zimbabwe 206 (49.5 overs); West Indies 208/6 (47.5 overs). **West Indies win by 4 wickets, 5–match series level at 1–1.**

==== Cross-country skiing ====
- World Cup in Lahti, Finland:
  - Men's Pursuit: (gold) Maurice Manificat (FRA) (silver) Lukáš Bauer (CZE) (bronze) Ilia Chernousov (RUS)
    - Overall standings: (1) Petter Northug (NOR) 1060 points (2) Bauer 888 (3) Dario Cologna (SUI) 735
    - Distance standings: (1) Northug 514 points (2) Bauer 488 (3) Marcus Hellner (SWE) 379
  - Women's Pursuit: (gold) Marit Bjørgen (NOR) (silver) Justyna Kowalczyk (POL) (bronze) Therese Johaug (NOR)
    - Overall standings: (1) Kowalczyk 1696 points (2) Petra Majdič (SLO) 1191 (3) Aino-Kaisa Saarinen (FIN) 910
      - Kowalczyk secures the title with 7 races remaining since Majdič is out for the rest of the season.
    - Distance standings: (1) Kowalczyk 857 points (2) Bjørgen 430 (3) Majdič 425
      - Kowalczyk secures the title with 4 races remaining.

==== Field hockey ====
- Men's World Cup in New Delhi, India:
  - Pool B: (teams in **bold** advance to the semifinals, teams in ~~strike~~ are eliminated)
    - Australia 2–0 Spain
    - ~~South Africa~~ 4–3 ~~Pakistan~~
    - ~~India~~ 2–3 **England**
      - Standings (after 4 matches): England 12 points, Australia 9, Spain 6, India, Pakistan, South Africa 3.

==== Football (soccer) ====
- OFC Champions League Group stage, Matchday 5: (teams in ~~strike~~ are eliminated)
  - Group A: ~~AS Magenta~~ (New Caledonia) 1–1 (New Zealand) Auckland City FC
    - Standings: Auckland City FC 11 points (5 matches), Waitakere United 8 (4), AS Magenta 3 (5), ~~AS Manu-Ura~~ 1 (4).
  - Group B: Tafea FC (Vanuatu) 0–0 ~~(Solomon Islands) Marist FC~~
    - Standings: Lautoka F.C. 9 points (4 matches), Tafea FC 8 (5), PRK Hekari United 7 (4), Marist FC 1 (5).

==== Freestyle skiing ====
- World Cup in Branas, Sweden:
  - Men's skicross: (gold) Michael Schmid (SUI) (silver) Christopher Del Bosco (CAN) (bronze) Andreas Matt (AUT)
    - Standings after 8 of 11 events: (1) Schmid 535 points (2) Del Bosco 377 (3) Matt 366
  - Women's skicross: (gold) Ophélie David (FRA) (silver) Aleisha Cline (CAN) (bronze) Fanny Smith (SUI)
    - Standings after 8 of 11 events: (1) David 575 points (2) Ashleigh McIvor (CAN) 457 (3) Kelsey Serwa (CAN) 332
- World Cup in Inawashiro, Japan:
  - Both the Men's and Women's moguls events postponed due to fog.

==== Nordic combined ====
- World Cup in Lahti, Finland:
  - HS130 / 10 km: (gold) Hannu Manninen (FIN) (silver) Felix Gottwald (AUT) (bronze) Jason Lamy-Chappuis (FRA)
    - Standings after 18 of 19 events: (1) Lamy-Chappuis 1055 points (2) Gottwald 799 (3) Eric Frenzel (GER) 688
      - Lamy-Chappuis has already secured the title.

==== Ski jumping ====
- World Cup in Lahti, Finland:
  - HS 130 Team: (gold) Norway (Anders Bardal, Roar Ljøkelsøy, Tom Hilde, Anders Jacobsen) (silver) Austria (Martin Koch, Wolfgang Loitzl, Andreas Kofler, Thomas Morgenstern) (bronze) Germany (Andreas Wank, Martin Schmitt, Michael Uhrmann, Michael Neumayer)
    - Standings: (1) Austria 4634 (2) Germany 1755 (3) Norway 1622

==== Snowboarding ====
- World Cup in Moscow, Russia:
  - Men's parallel slalom: (gold) Aaron March (ITA) (silver) Benjamin Karl (AUT) (bronze) Roland Fischnaller (ITA)
    - Overall standings after 23 of 29 events: (1) Karl 5600 points (2) Pierre Vaultier (FRA) 4800 (3) Andreas Prommegger (AUT) 4450
    - Parallel slalom standings after 8 of 10 events: (1) Karl 5600 points (2) Prommegger 4450 (3) Jasey-Jay Anderson (CAN) 3800
  - Women's parallel slalom: (gold) Doris Guenther (AUT) (silver) Heidi Neururer (AUT) (bronze) Julia Dujmovits (AUT)
    - Overall standings after 18 of 24 events: (1) Maëlle Ricker (CAN) 3960 points (2) Nicolien Sauerbreij (NED) 3800 (2) Guenther 3710
    - Parallel slalom standings after 8 of 10 events: (1) Sauerbreij 3800 points (2) Guenther 3710 (3) Kober 3470

==== Speed skating ====
- World Cup 6 in Erfurt, Germany:
  - 500 m Men: (gold) Jan Smeekens (NED) (silver) Yuya Oikawa (JPN) (bronze) Ronald Mulder (NED)
    - Standings after 9 of 12 races: (1) Mika Poutala (FIN) 551 points (2) Tucker Fredricks (USA) 528 (3) Lee Kang-seok (KOR) 523
  - 500 m Women: (gold) Jenny Wolf (GER) (silver) Margot Boer (NED) (bronze) Heather Richardson (USA)
    - Standings after 9 of 12 races: (1) Wolf 860 points (2) Wang Beixing (CHN) 680 (3) Lee Sang-hwa (KOR) 505
  - 1000 m Men: (gold) Shani Davis (USA) (silver) Mark Tuitert (NED) (bronze) Stefan Groothuis (NED)
    - Standings after 5 of 7 races: (1) Davis 500 points (2) Tuitert 250 (3) Mo Tae-bum (KOR) 215
      - Davis wins the title with two races remaining.
  - 1000 m Women: (gold) Monique Angermüller (GER) (silver) Margot Boer (NED) (bronze) Natasja Bruintjes (NED)
    - Standings after 5 of 7 races: (1) Christine Nesbitt (CAN) 400 points (2) Angermüller 270 (3) Boer 245

==== Tennis ====
- Davis Cup:
  - World Group first round, day 2: (teams in **bold** advance to quarterfinals)
    - Spain 2–1 Switzerland
      - Marcel Granollers/Tommy Robredo (ESP) def. Yves Allegro/Stanislas Wawrinka (SUI) 7–6(8), 6–2, 4–6, 6–4
    - **France** 3–0 Germany
      - Julien Benneteau/Michaël Llodra (FRA) def. Christopher Kas/Philipp Kohlschreiber (GER) 6–1, 6–4, 1–6, 7–5
    - Russia 2–1 India
      - Mahesh Bhupathi/Leander Paes (IND) def. Teymuraz Gabashvili/Igor Kunitsyn (RUS) 6–3, 6–2, 6–2
    - Sweden 1–2 Argentina
      - David Nalbandian/Horacio Zeballos (ARG) def. Robert Lindstedt/Robin Söderling (SWE) 6–2, 7–6(4), 7–6(5)
    - **Croatia** 3–0 Ecuador
      - Marin Čilić/Ivo Karlović (CRO) def. Giovanni Lapentti/Nicolás Lapentti (ECU) 7–6(3), 6–3, 7–5
    - Serbia 2–1 United States
      - Bob Bryan/John Isner (USA) def. Janko Tipsarević/Nenad Zimonjić (SRB) 7–6(8), 5–7, 7–6(8), 6–3
    - Belgium 0–3 **Czech Republic**
      - Tomáš Berdych/Radek Štěpánek (CZE) def. Steve Darcis/Olivier Rochus (BEL) 7–6(0), 6–0, 6–3
  - World Group first round, day 1:
    - Chile 2–0 Israel
      - Nicolás Massú (CHI) def. Dudi Sela (ISR) 4–6, 6–2, 6–2, 6–4
      - Fernando González (CHI) def. Harel Levy (ISR) 2–6, 6–3, 6–4, 6–4

=== March 5, 2010 (Friday) ===
==== Alpine skiing ====
- Women's World Cup in Crans-Montana, Switzerland:
  - Super combined: Cancelled
    - Overall standings after 26 of 32 races: (1) Lindsey Vonn (USA) 1311 points, (2) Maria Riesch (GER) 1174, (3) Anja Pärson (SWE) 886
    - Combined standings after 2 of 2 races: (1) Vonn 160 points (2) Pärson 150 (3) Michaela Kirchgasser (AUT) 130

==== Basketball ====
- U.S. college basketball:
  - Men's:
    - Cornell defeats Brown 95–76 to clinch the Ivy League title and become the first team to secure its bid to the NCAA tournament.

==== Cricket ====
- England in Bangladesh:
  - 3rd ODI in Chittagong:
    - England 284/5 (50.0 overs, Craig Kieswetter 107); Bangladesh 239/9 (50.0 overs). **England win by 45 runs, win the 3–match series 3–0.**

==== Field hockey ====
- Men's World Cup in New Delhi, India:
  - Pool A:
    - South Korea 1–2 New Zealand
    - Netherlands 6–0 Canada
    - Germany 4–3 Argentina
      - Standings (after 3 matches): Netherlands 9 points, Germany 7, New Zealand 6, Korea 4, Argentina, Canada 0 (3).

==== Football (soccer) ====
- OFC Champions League Group stage, Matchday 5: (teams in ~~strike~~ are eliminated)
  - Group A: ~~AS Manu-Ura~~ (French Polynesia) – (New Zealand) Waitakere United postponed due to a waterlogged pitch.
    - Standings (after 4 matches): Auckland City FC 10 points, Waitakere United 8, ~~AS Magenta~~ 2, AS Manu-Ura 1.

==== Nordic combined ====
- World Cup in Lahti, Finland:
  - HS130 / 10 km: (gold) Magnus Moan (NOR) (silver) Hannu Manninen (FIN) (bronze) Tino Edelmann (GER)
    - Standings after 17 of 19 events: (1) Jason Lamy-Chappuis (FRA) 995 points (2) Felix Gottwald (AUT) 719 (3) Eric Frenzel (GER) 675
      - Lamy-Chappuis secures the World Cup title and becomes the first French World Cup winner since Fabrice Guy in 1992.

==== Tennis ====
- Davis Cup:
  - World Group first round, day 1:
    - Spain 1–1 Switzerland
      - Stanislas Wawrinka (SUI) def. Nicolás Almagro (ESP) 3–6, 6–4, 3–6, 7–5, 6–3
      - David Ferrer (ESP) def Marco Chiudinelli (SUI) 6–2, 7–6(5), 6–1
    - France 2–0 Germany
      - Gaël Monfils (FRA) def. Philipp Kohlschreiber (GER) 6–1, 6–4, 7–6(5)
      - Jo-Wilfried Tsonga (FRA) def. Benjamin Becker (GER) 6–3, 6–2, 6–7(2), 6–3
    - Russia 2–0 India
      - Igor Kunitsyn (RUS) def. Somdev Devvarman (IND) 6–7(6), 7–6(4), 6–3, 6–4
      - Mikhail Youzhny (RUS) def. Rohan Bopanna (IND) 6–4, 6–2, 6–3
    - Sweden 1–1 Argentina
      - Robin Söderling (SWE) def. Eduardo Schwank (ARG) 6–1, 7–6(0), 7–5
      - Leonardo Mayer (ARG) def. Joachim Johansson (SWE) 5–7, 6–3, 7–5, 6–4
    - Croatia 2–0 Ecuador
      - Ivo Karlović (CRO) def. Nicolás Lapentti (ECU) 6–2, 5–7, 6–7(2), 6–3, 6–4
      - Marin Čilić (CRO) def. Giovanni Lapentti (ECU) 6–4, 6–3, 6–3
    - Serbia 2–0 United States
      - Viktor Troicki (SRB) def. John Isner (USA) 7–6(4), 5–7(5), 7–5, 6–4
      - Novak Djokovic (SRB) def. Sam Querrey (USA) 6–2, 7–6(4), 2–6, 6–3
    - Belgium 0–2 Czech Republic
      - Tomáš Berdych (CZE) def. Olivier Rochus (BEL) 6–3, 6–0, 6–4
      - Radek Štěpánek (CZE) def. Xavier Malisse (BEL) 6–2, 6–4, 7–6(3)

=== March 4, 2010 (Thursday) ===
==== Basketball ====
- Euroleague Top 16, matchday 5: (teams in **bold** advance to the quarterfinals, teams in ~~strike~~ are eliminated)
  - Group E: Partizan Belgrade (Serbia) 66–82 (Greece) ~~Panathinaikos Athens~~
    - Standings: **Regal FC Barcelona** 4–1, Partizan Belgrade 3–2, Maroussi Athens 2–3, Panathinaikos Athens 1–4.
  - Group F:
    - ~~Efes Pilsen Istanbul~~ (Turkey) 75–77 (Spain) **Real Madrid**
    - **Maccabi Tel Aviv** (Israel) 97–82 (Italy) ~~Montepaschi Siena~~
      - Standings: Maccabi Tel Aviv, Real Madrid 3–2; Efes Pilsen Istanbul, Montepaschi Siena 2–3.
  - Group H: **Olympiacos Piraeus** (Greece) 102–85 (Spain) Caja Laboral Baskonia
    - Standings: Olympiacos Piraeus 5–0, Caja Laboral Baskonia, Khimki Moscow Region 2–3, Cibona Zagreb 1–4.
    - Olympiacos win the group and claim home advantage in a quarterfinal series against Asseco Prokom Gdynia.

==== Cricket ====
- Zimbabwe in West Indies:
  - 1st ODI in Providence, Guyana:
    - Zimbabwe 254/5 (50.0 overs); West Indies 252/9 (50.0 overs). **Zimbabwe win by 2 runs, lead the 5–match series 1–0.**

==== Darts ====
- Premier League round 4 in Exeter, England:
  - James Wade (ENG) 7–7 Adrian Lewis (ENG)
  - Ronnie Baxter (ENG) 8–6 Simon Whitlock (AUS)
  - Mervyn King (ENG) 8–5 Terry Jenkins (ENG)
  - Phil Taylor (ENG) 8–2 Raymond van Barneveld (NED)
    - Highest Checkout: James Wade 148
      - Standings (after four rounds): Taylor 8 points, King 6, Baxter 5, Jenkins 4, Whitlock, Lewis 3, van Barneveld 2, Wade 1.

==== Field hockey ====
- Men's World Cup in New Delhi, India:
  - Pool B:
    - South Africa 0–12 Australia
    - England 5–2 Pakistan
    - India 2–5 Spain
      - Standings (after 3 matches): England 9 points, Australia, Spain 6, India, Pakistan 3, South Africa 0.

==== Football (soccer) ====
- Friendly international match:
  - New Zealand 0–2 Mexico

=== March 3, 2010 (Wednesday) ===
==== Basketball ====
- ULEB Eurocup Last 16, matchday 5: (teams in **bold** advance to the quarterfinals, teams in ~~strike~~ are eliminated)
  - Group I: ALBA Berlin (Germany) 83–71 (France) ~~Le Mans~~
    - Standings: **Aris BSA 2003**, ALBA Berlin, DKV Joventut 3–2, Le Mans 1–4
- Euroleague Top 16, matchday 5: (teams in **bold** advance to the quarterfinals, teams in ~~strike~~ are eliminated)
  - Group E: Maroussi Athens (Greece) 58–85 (Spain) **Regal FC Barcelona**
    - Standings: Regal FC Barcelona 4–1, Partizan Belgrade 3–1, Maroussi Athens 2–3, ~~Panathinaikos Athens~~ 0–4
  - Group G:
    - ~~Žalgiris Kaunas~~ (Lithuania) 93–88 (Poland) **Asseco Prokom Gdynia**
    - ~~Unicaja Málaga~~ (Spain) 70–76 (Russia) **CSKA Moscow**
      - Standings: CSKA Moscow 4–1, Asseco Prokom Gdynia 3–2, Žalgiris Kaunas 2–3, Unicaja Málaga 1–4.
      - Asseco Prokom advance to the quarterfinals for the first time in their history.
      - CSKA secure first place in the group and home advantage in the quarterfinals.
  - Group H: Cibona Zagreb (Croatia) 82–63 (Russia) Khimki Moscow Region
    - Standings: **Olympiacos Piraeus** 4–0, Caja Laboral Baskonia 2–2, Khimki Moscow Region 2–3, Cibona Zagreb 1–4
- PBA Philippine Cup Finals:
  - Purefoods Tender Juicy Giants 86, Alaska Aces 76. **Purefoods wins series 4–0.**
    - Purefoods wins their fifth Philippine Cup and eighth PBA championship, via a 4–0 sweep, third in league Finals history, while Alaska is defeated in the Philippine Cup Finals for the second consecutive year.

==== Cricket ====
- Australia in New Zealand:
  - 1st ODI in Napier:
    - Australia 275/8 (50.0 overs); New Zealand 281/8 (49.2 overs). **New Zealand win by 2 wickets, lead the 5–match series 1–0.**

==== Field hockey ====
- Men's World Cup in New Delhi, India:
  - Pool A:
    - Canada 0–6 Germany
    - Argentina 1–2 South Korea
    - New Zealand 1–3 Netherlands
      - Standings (after 2 matches): Netherlands 6 points, Germany, Korea 4, New Zealand 3, Argentina, Canada 0.

==== Football (soccer) ====
- 2011 Asian Cup qualification, final matchday: (teams in **bold** qualify to 2011 AFC Asian Cup)
  - Group A:
    - **Japan** 2–0 **Bahrain**
    - Hong Kong 0–0 Yemen
      - Final standings: Japan 15 points, Bahrain 12, Yemen 7, Hong Kong 1.
  - Group B:
    - **Australia** 1–0 Indonesia
    - Oman 0–0 **Kuwait**
      - Final standings: Australia 11 points, Kuwait 9, Oman 8, Indonesia 3.
  - Group C: **Uzbekistan** 0–1 **United Arab Emirates**
    - Final standings: United Arab Emirates, Uzbekistan 9 points, Malaysia 0.
  - Group D: **Syria** 4–0 Lebanon
    - Final standings: Syria 14 points, **China** 13, Vietnam 5, Lebanon 1.
  - Group E:
    - **Iran** 1–0 Thailand
    - **Jordan** 2–1 Singapore
      - Final standings: Iran 13 points, Jordan 8, Thailand, Singapore 6.
- European Under-21 Championship qualification: (teams in **bold** qualify to the playoffs, teams in ~~strike~~ are eliminated)
  - Group 1: ~~Andorra~~ 1–3 Moldova
    - Standings: Russia, Romania 18 points (7 matches), Moldova 10 (7), Latvia 9 (7), ~~Faroe Islands~~ 8 (8), Andorra 1 (8).
  - Group 2:
    - Georgia 2–0 Estonia
    - Republic of Ireland 1–2 Armenia
      - Standings: Switzerland 16 points (7 matches), Turkey 10 (6), Estonia 9 (7), Georgia 8 (6), Armenia 7 (7), Republic of Ireland 4 (7)
  - Group 3: Italy 2–0 Hungary
    - Standings: Wales 13 points (6 matches), Italy 10 (6), Hungary 9 (5), Bosnia and Herzegovina 7 (5), ~~Luxembourg~~ 4 (8).
  - Group 4: Netherlands 3–2 Poland
    - Standings: Netherlands 18 points (6 matches), Spain 12 (5), Poland 9 (6), Finland 3 (5), ~~Liechtenstein~~ 0 (6).
  - Group 6: Montenegro 2–0 ~~Bulgaria~~
    - Standings: Montenegro 13 points (6 matches), Sweden 10 (4), Israel 10 (5), ~~Kazakhstan~~ 5 (8), Bulgaria 4 (7)
  - Group 8: Belgium 1–0 ~~Malta~~
    - Standings: Ukraine, France 11 points (5 matches), Belgium 11 (6), Slovenia 6 (6), Malta 0 (6)
  - Group 9: England 1–2 Greece
    - Standings: Greece 16 points (7 matches), England 11 (6), Portugal 7 (5), Lithuania 5 (6), ~~North Macedonia~~ 2 (6)
- Friendly international matches (selected):
  - Ivory Coast 0–2 South Korea in London
  - Greece 0–2 Senegal
  - Nigeria 5–2 DR Congo
  - Slovakia 0–1 Norway
  - Bosnia and Herzegovina 2–1 Ghana
  - Turkey 2–0 Honduras
  - Algeria 0–3 Serbia
  - Hungary 1–1 Russia
  - South Africa 1–1 Namibia
  - Romania 0–2 Israel
  - Switzerland 1–3 Uruguay
  - Austria 2–1 Denmark
  - Poland 2–0 Bulgaria
  - Belgium 0–1 Croatia
  - Germany 0–1 Argentina
  - Netherlands 2–1 United States
  - Italy 0–0 Cameroon in Monte Carlo
  - Wales 0–1 Sweden
  - England 3–1 Egypt
  - France 0–2 Spain
    - Spain get their first win in France in 42 years.
  - Scotland 1–0 Czech Republic
  - Portugal 2–0 China
- Algarve Cup Final in Faro, Portugal:
  - United States 3–2 Germany
    - USA win the Cup for the seventh time.

==== Freestyle skiing ====
- World Cup in Norefjell, Norway:
  - Men's skicross: Cancelled
  - Women's skicross: Cancelled

=== March 2, 2010 (Tuesday) ===
==== Basketball ====
- ULEB Eurocup Last 16, matchday 5 (teams in **bold** advance to the quarterfinals, teams in ~~strike~~ are eliminated):
  - Group I: Aris BSA 2003 (Greece) 84–54 (Spain) DKV Joventut
    - Standings: Aris BSA 2003, DKV Joventut 3–2, ALBA Berlin 2–2, Le Mans 1–3.
  - Group J:
    - UNICS Kazan (Russia) 92–89 (Turkey) ~~Galatasaray Café Crown~~
    - Hapoel Jerusalem (Israel) 64–69 (Spain) Power Elec Valencia
      - Standings: Power Elec Valencia 4–1, Hapoel Jerusalem, UNICS Kazan 3–2, Galatasaray Café Crown 0–5.
  - Group K:
    - ~~Brose Baskets~~ (Germany) 84–81 (Greece) **Panellinios BC**
    - **Bizkaia Bilbao Basket** (Spain) 68–72 (Italy) ~~Benetton Basket~~
      - Standings: Bizkaia Bilbao Basket 4–1, Panellinios BC 3–2, Brose Baskets 2–3, Benetton Basket 1–4
  - Group L:
    - ~~Türk Telekom~~ (Turkey) 78–79 (Spain) Gran Canaria 2014
    - Crvena zvezda (Serbia) 55–73 (Czech Republic) ČEZ Nymburk
      - Standings: Crvena zvezda, ČEZ Nymburk, Gran Canaria 2014 3–2, Türk Telekom 1–4.

==== Cricket ====
- England in Bangladesh:
  - 2nd ODI in Mirpur:
    - Bangladesh 260/6 (50.0 overs); England 261/8 (48.5 overs, EJG Morgan 110*). **England win by 2 wickets, lead the 3–match series 2–0.**

==== Field hockey ====
- Men's World Cup in New Delhi, India:
  - Pool B:
    - South Africa 4–6 England
    - Pakistan 2–1 Spain
    - India 2–5 Australia
      - Standings (after 2 matches): England 6 points, Australia, Spain, India, Pakistan 3, South Africa 0.

==== Football (soccer) ====
- European Under-21 Championship qualification: (teams in ~~strike~~ are eliminated)
  - Group 3: ~~Luxembourg~~ 0–1 Bosnia and Herzegovina
    - Standings: Wales 13 points (6 matches), Hungary 9 (4), Italy, Bosnia and Herzegovina 7 (5), Luxembourg 4 (8),
  - Group 4: Spain 3–1 ~~Liechtenstein~~
    - Standings: Netherlands 15 points (5 matches), Spain 12 (5), Poland 9 (5), Finland 3 (5), Liechtenstein 0 (6).
  - Group 5:
    - Germany 2–2 Iceland
    - ~~San Marino~~ 0–3 ~~Northern Ireland~~
      - Standings: Czech Republic 15 points (5 matches), Iceland 13 (6), Germany 8 (5), Northern Ireland 4 (6), San Marino 0 (6)
  - Group 10: Scotland 2–2 ~~Azerbaijan~~
    - Standings: Scotland, Austria 13 points (6 matches), Belarus 12 (5), ~~Albania~~ 4 (7), Azerbaijan 1 (6)
- Friendly international match:
  - Republic of Ireland 0–2 Brazil in London, England

=== March 1, 2010 (Monday) ===
==== Field hockey ====
- Men's World Cup in New Delhi, India:
  - Pool A:
    - New Zealand 3–2 Canada
    - Germany 2–2 South Korea
    - Netherlands 3–0 Argentina
