= April 2010 in sports =

<<	April 2010					>>
Su	Mo	Tu	We	Th	Fr	Sa
				1	2	3
4	5	6	7	8	9	10
11	12	13	14	15	16	17
18	19	20	21	22	23	24
25	26	27	28	29	30
Sports

This list shows notable sports-related deaths, events, and notable outcomes that occurred in April of 2010.

== Deaths in April ==
- 23: Natalia Lavrova
- 21: Juan Antonio Samaranch
- 20: Keli McGregor
- 10: Arthur Mercante Sr.
- 10: Piotr Nurowski
- 8: Personal Ensign
- 4: Alec Bedser

== Current sporting seasons ==
=== Australian rules football 2010 ===
- Australian Football League

=== Auto racing 2010 ===
- Formula One
- Sprint Cup
- IRL IndyCar Series
- World Rally Championship
- Formula Two
- Nationwide Series
- Camping World Truck Series
- WTTC
- V8 Supercar
- American Le Mans
- Le Mans Series
- Superleague Formula
- Rolex Sports Car Series
- FIA GT1 World Championship
- Formula Three
- Auto GP
- World Series by Renault
- Deutsche Tourenwagen Masters
- Super GT

=== Baseball 2010 ===
- Major League Baseball
- Nippon Professional Baseball

=== Basketball 2010 ===
- NBA
- Euroleague
- EuroChallenge
- France
- Germany
- Greece
- Israel
- Italy
- Philippines
  - Fiesta Conference
- Spain
- Turkey

=== Cricket 2009–2010 ===
- Bangladesh:
  - National League
- England:
  - County Championship
- India:
  - Ranji Trophy
- New Zealand:
  - Plunket Shield
- Pakistan:
  - Quaid-i-Azam Trophy
- South Africa:
  - SuperSport Series
- Sri Lanka:
  - Premier Trophy
- Zimbabwe:
  - Logan Cup

=== Darts ===
- Premier League

=== Football (soccer) 2010 ===
National teams competitions

- 2011 FIFA Women's World Cup qualification (UEFA)
- 2011 UEFA European Under-21 Championship qualification

International clubs competitions

- UEFA (Europe) Champions League
- Europa League
- UEFA Women's Champions League
- Copa Libertadores (South America)
- AFC (Asia) Champions League
- AFC Cup
- CAF (Africa) Champions League
- CAF Confederation Cup
- OFC (Oceania) Champions League

Domestic (national) competitions

- Argentina
- England
- France
- Germany
- Iran
- Italy
- Japan
- Norway
- Russia
- Scotland
- Spain
- Major League Soccer (USA & Canada)
- Women's Professional Soccer (USA)

=== Golf 2010 ===
- PGA Tour
- European Tour
- LPGA Tour
- Champions Tour

=== Ice hockey 2010 ===
- National Hockey League
- Canadian Hockey League:
  - OHL, QMJHL, WHL

=== Motorcycle racing 2010 ===
- Moto GP
- Superbike World Championship
- Supersport racing

=== Rugby league 2010 ===
- Super League
- NRL

=== Rugby union 2010 ===
- 2011 Rugby World Cup qualifying
- Heineken Cup
- European Challenge Cup
- English Premiership
- Celtic League
- Top 14
- Super 14
- Sevens World Series

== Days of the month ==
=== April 30, 2010 (Friday) ===
==== Auto racing ====
- Nationwide Series:
  - BUBBA burger 250 in Richmond, Virginia:
    - (1) (Michigan) Brad Keselowski (Dodge, Penske Racing) (2) (Washington (state)) Greg Biffle (Ford, Baker-Curb Racing) (3) (Missouri) Jamie McMurray (Chevrolet, JR Motorsports)
      - Drivers' championship standings (after 9 of 35 races): (1) Keselowski 1469 points (2) (California) Kevin Harvick (Chevrolet, Kevin Harvick Incorporated) 1410 (3) (Nevada) Kyle Busch (Toyota, Joe Gibbs Racing) 1385

==== Basketball ====
- NBA Playoffs (all series best-of-7):
  - Western Conference First Round:
    - Game 6: Los Angeles Lakers 95, Oklahoma City Thunder 94. **Lakers win series 4–2.**
    - Game 6: Utah Jazz 112, Denver Nuggets 104. **Jazz win series 4–2.**
  - Eastern Conference First Round:
    - Game 6: Atlanta Hawks 83, Milwaukee Bucks 69. Series tied 3–3.
- EuroChallenge Final Four:
  - Semifinals:
    - **BG Göttingen** (Germany) 77–67 (France) Chorale Roanne Basket
    - **Krasnye Krylya Samara** (Russia) 73–70 (Italy) Scavolini Spar Pesaro

==== Chess ====
- World Championship in Sofia, Bulgaria
  - Game 5: Veselin Topalov (BUL) (White) drew with Viswanathan Anand (IND) (Black)
    - Anand leads the series 3–2.

==== Cricket ====
- ICC Men's World Twenty20 in West Indies:
  - Group B: Sri Lanka 135/6 (20 overs); New Zealand 139/8 (19.5 overs) in Guyana. **New Zealand win by 2 wickets.**
  - Group D: West Indies 138/9 (20.0 overs); Ireland 68 all out (16.4 overs) in Guyana. **West Indies win by 70 runs.**

==== Cycling ====
- UCI ProTour:
  - Tour de Romandie:
    - Stage 3: (gold) Richie Porte (AUS) (Team Saxo Bank) 30' 54" (silver) Alejandro Valverde (ESP) (Caisse d'Epargne) + 26" (bronze) Vladimir Karpets (RUS) (Team Katusha) + 27"
      - General classification: (1) Michael Rogers (AUS) (Team HTC–Columbia) 9h 56' 03" (2) Valverde + 2" (3) Karpets + 5"

==== Equestrianism ====
- Show jumping
  - FEI Nations Cup Promotional League:
    - FEI Nations Cup of Belgium in Lummen: (gold) Ireland (Denis Lynch on Abberuail van het Dingeshof, Alex Duffy on Tampa, Shane Breen on Carmena Z, Billy Twomey on Tinka's Serenade) (silver) Australia (Chris Chugg on Vivant, Paul Athanasoff on Wirragulla Nicklaus, Phillip Lever on Ashleigh Drossel Dan, James Paterson-Robinson on Niack de L'Abbaye) (bronze) Norway (Stein Endresen on Hoyo de Monterey, Geir Gulliksen on L'Espoir, Connie Bull on Cézanne, Morten Djupvik on Casino)

==== Gymnastics ====
- European Women's Artistic Gymnastics Championships in Birmingham, United Kingdom:
  - Juniors all round: (gold) Viktoria Komova (RUS) (silver) Anastasia Grishina (RUS) (bronze) Larisa Iordache (ROU)

==== Ice hockey ====
- Stanley Cup playoffs (all series best-of-7):
  - Eastern Conference Semifinals:
    - Game 1: (4) Pittsburgh Penguins 6, (8) Montreal Canadiens 3. Penguins lead series 1–0.

==== Rugby union ====
- 2011 Rugby World Cup qualifying:
  - 2010 Asian Five Nations:
    - Arabian Gulf 16–9 Hong Kong in Manama, Bahrain
      - Standings: Hong Kong 7 points (2 matches), Kazakhstan 6 (1), Arabian Gulf 5 (2), Japan 0 (0), South Korea 0 (1).
- Amlin Challenge Cup Semi-finals:
  - Connacht (Ireland) 12–19 (France) Toulon
    - Toulon's win means that the final will be held at Stade Vélodrome in Marseille.

==== Snooker ====
- World Championship in Sheffield, England:
  - Semi-finals (best of 33 frames):
    - Neil Robertson (AUS) leads Ali Carter (ENG) 15–9
    - Graeme Dott (SCO) leads Mark Selby (ENG) 10–6

=== April 29, 2010 (Thursday) ===
==== Basketball ====
- NBA Playoffs (all series best-of-7):
  - Western Conference First Round:
    - Game 6: San Antonio Spurs 97, Dallas Mavericks 87. **Spurs win series 4–2.**
    - Game 6: Phoenix Suns 99, Portland Trail Blazers 90. **Suns win series 4–2.**
- NBA season awards:
  - Rookie of the Year: Tyreke Evans, Sacramento Kings
- The NCAA board of directors votes to expand the Division I men's tournament from 65 teams to 68, effective with next year's tournament. (AP via ESPN)

==== Cycling ====
- UCI ProTour:
  - Tour de Romandie:
    - Stage 2: (gold) Mark Cavendish (GBR) (Team HTC–Columbia) 4h 28' 59" (silver) Danilo Hondo (GER) (Lampre–Farnese Vini) s.t. (bronze) Robbie Hunter (RSA) (Garmin–Transitions) s.t.
      - General classification: (1) Peter Sagan (SVK) (Liquigas–Doimo) 9h 24' 28" (2) Marco Pinotti (ITA) (Team HTC–Columbia) + 9" (3) Jérémy Roy (FRA) (Française des Jeux) + 9"

==== Darts ====
- Premier League round 12 in Aberdeen, Scotland: (players in **bold** advance to semifinals, players in ~~strike~~ are eliminated)
  - Ronnie Baxter (ENG) 7–7 James Wade (ENG)
  - Mervyn King (ENG) 1–8 **Phil Taylor** (ENG)
  - ~~Raymond van Barneveld~~ (NED) 8–6 ~~Terry Jenkins~~ (ENG)
    - Barneveld hit the second nine dart finish of the Premier League in the second leg. (T20, T19 and D12)
  - Simon Whitlock (AUS) 7–7 Adrian Lewis (ENG)
    - High checkout: Jenkins 146
      - Standings after 12 rounds: Taylor 22 points, King 13, Wade, Baxter, Whitlock 12, Lewis 10, Jenkins 8, Barneveld 7.

==== Football (soccer) ====
- UEFA Europa League semi-finals, second leg: (first leg score in parentheses)
  - **Fulham (England)** 2–1 (0–0) (Germany) Hamburg. Fulham win 2–1 on aggregate.
  - Liverpool (England) 2–1 (AET) (0–1) (Spain) **Atlético Madrid**. 2–2 on aggregate, Atlético Madrid win on away goals.
- Copa Libertadores Round of 16, first leg:
  - Once Caldas (Colombia) 0–0 (Paraguay) Libertad
  - Cruzeiro (Brazil) 3–1 (Uruguay) Nacional
  - Alianza Lima (Peru) 0–1 Universidad de Chile
- (San Marino) Coppa Titano Final in Serravalle:
  - Tre Penne 1–2 (AET) **Tre Fiori**
    - Tre Fiori win their sixth Coppa Titano, and their first since 1985.

==== Ice hockey ====
- Stanley Cup playoffs (all series best-of-7):
  - Western Conference Semifinals:
    - Game 1: (1) San Jose Sharks 4, (5) Detroit Red Wings 3. Sharks lead series 1–0.

==== Snooker ====
- World Championship in Sheffield, England:
  - Semi-finals (best of 33 frames):
    - Neil Robertson (AUS) leads Ali Carter (ENG) 6–2
    - Graeme Dott (SCO) leads Mark Selby (ENG) 5–3

=== April 28, 2010 (Wednesday) ===
==== Baseball ====
- Major League Baseball announces several rules changes for the All-Star Game. The most notable ones are: (AP via ESPN)
  - The designated hitter will be used in all games, even in National League ballparks.
  - Pitchers who start on the Sunday before the All-Star break will not be allowed to participate in the game, and will be replaced on the roster.

==== Basketball ====
- NBA Playoffs (all series best-of-7):
  - Western Conference First Round:
    - Game 5: Denver Nuggets 116, Utah Jazz 102. Jazz lead series 3–2.
  - Eastern Conference First Round:
    - Game 5: Milwaukee Bucks 91, Atlanta Hawks 87. Bucks lead series 3–2.

==== Chess ====
- World Championship in Sofia, Bulgaria
  - Game 4: Viswanathan Anand (IND) (White) def. Veselin Topalov (BUL) (Black)
    - Anand leads the series 2½–1½.

==== Cycling ====
- UCI ProTour:
  - Tour de Romandie:
    - Stage 1: (gold) Peter Sagan (SVK) (Liquigas–Doimo) 4h 50' 21" (silver) Francesco Gavazzi (ITA) (Lampre–Farnese Vini) s.t. (bronze) Nicolas Roche (IRL) (Ag2r–La Mondiale) s.t.
      - General classification: (1) Sagan 4h 55' 29" (2) Marco Pinotti (ITA) (Team HTC–Columbia) + 9" (3) Jérémy Roy (FRA) (Française des Jeux) + 12"

==== Football (soccer) ====
- 2011 FIFA Women's World Cup qualification (UEFA): (teams in ~~strike~~ are eliminated)
  - Group 2: Belarus 6–0 North Macedonia
    - Standings: Netherlands 13 points (6 matches), Norway 12 (4), Belarus 7 (4), Slovakia 3 (4), ~~Macedonia~~ 0 (6).
- UEFA Champions League semi-finals, second leg: (first leg score in parentheses)
  - Barcelona (Spain) 1–0 (1–3) (Italy) **Internazionale**. Internazionale win 3–2 on aggregate.
    - Internazionale advance to the final for the fifth time in their history and the first time since 1972.
- Copa Libertadores Round of 16, first leg:
  - Flamengo (Brazil) 1–0 (Brazil) Corinthians
  - Universitario (Peru) 0–0 (Brazil) São Paulo
  - Banfield (Argentina) 3–1 (Brazil) Internacional
- AFC Champions League group stage, Round 6: (teams in **bold** advance to the round of 16)
  - Group A:
    - Al-Jazira (United Arab Emirates) 2–1 (Iran) **Esteghlal**
    - Al-Ahli (Saudi Arabia) 0–1 (Qatar) **Al-Gharafa**
      - Final standings: Al-Gharafa 13 points, Esteghlal 11, Al-Ahli 6, Al-Jazira 4.
  - Group B:
    - **Bunyodkor** (Uzbekistan) 4–1 (United Arab Emirates) Al-Wahda
    - **Zob Ahan** (Iran) 1–0 (Saudi Arabia) Al-Ittihad
      - Final standings: Zob Ahan 13 points, Bunyodkor 10, Al-Ittihad 8, Al-Wahda 3.
  - Group E:
    - **Seongnam Ilhwa Chunma** (South Korea) 3–2 (Australia) Melbourne Victory
    - **Beijing Guoan** (China) 2–0 (Japan) Kawasaki Frontale
      - Final standings: Seongnam Ilhwa Chunma 15 points, Beijing Guoan 10, Kawasaki Frontale 6, Melbourne Victory 4.
  - Group F:
    - Persipura Jayapura (Indonesia) 2–0 (China) Changchun Yatai
    - **Kashima Antlers** (Japan) 2–1 (South Korea) **Jeonbuk Hyundai Motors**
      - Final standings: Kashima Antlers 18 points, Jeonbuk Hyundai Motors 12, Changchun Yatai, Persipura Jayapura 3.
- AFC Cup group stage, Round 6: (teams in **bold** advance to the round of 16)
  - Group A:
    - Al-Ahli (Yemen) 2–2 (Oman) Saham
    - **Al-Karamah** (Syria) 1–1 (Jordan) **Shabab Al-Ordon**
      - Final standings: Al-Karamah 14 points, Shabab Al-Ordon 12, Saham 5, Al-Ahli 1.
  - Group B:
    - **Al-Kuwait** 7–1 (India) **Churchill Brothers**
      - Final standings: Al-Kuwait 8 points, Churchill Brothers 7, (Yemen) Al-Hilal 1.
  - Group E:
    - Al-Wihdat (Jordan) 0–0 (Bahrain) **Al-Riffa**
    - Al-Nahda (Oman) 0–2 (Qatar) **Al-Rayyan**
      - Final standings: Al-Rayyan 15 points, Al-Riffa 13, Al-Wihdat 7, Al-Nahda 0.
  - Group F:
    - Victory SC (Maldives) 0–5 (Vietnam) **Bình Dương**
    - Selangor (Malaysia) 0–4 (Indonesia) **Sriwijaya**
      - Final standings: Sriwijaya, Bình Dương 13 points, Selangor, Victory SC 4.
- CONCACAF Champions League Final, second leg: (first leg score in parentheses)
  - **Pachuca** (Mexico) 1–0 (1–2) (Mexico) Cruz Azul. 2–2 on aggregate; Pachuca win on away goals.
    - A goal by Edgar Benítez in the 90th minute gives Pachuca the title for the third time in four seasons, and for the fourth time overall.
- UEFA Women's Champions League semi-finals, second leg: (first leg score in parentheses)
  - Umeå (Sweden) 0–0 (2–3) (France) **Lyon**. Lyon win 3–2 on aggregate.

==== Ice hockey ====
- Stanley Cup playoffs (all series best-of-7):
  - Eastern Conference Quarter-finals:
    - Game 7: (8) Montreal Canadiens 2, (1) Washington Capitals 1. **Canadiens win series 4–3.**

==== Snooker ====
- World Championship in Sheffield, England:
  - Quarter-finals (best of 25 frames):
    - Graeme Dott (SCO) def. Mark Allen (NIR) 13–12
    - Neil Robertson (AUS) def. Steve Davis (ENG) 13–5
    - Mark Selby (ENG) def. Ronnie O'Sullivan (ENG) 13–11
    - Ali Carter (ENG) def. Shaun Murphy (ENG) 13–12

=== April 27, 2010 (Tuesday) ===
==== Basketball ====
- NBA Playoffs (all series best-of-7):
  - Western Conference First Round:
    - Game 5: Los Angeles Lakers 111, Oklahoma City Thunder 87. Lakers lead series 3–2.
    - Game 5: Dallas Mavericks 103, San Antonio Spurs 81. Spurs lead series 3–2.
  - Eastern Conference First Round:
    - Game 5: Cleveland Cavaliers 96, Chicago Bulls 94. **Cavaliers win series 4–1.**
    - Game 5: Boston Celtics 96, Miami Heat 86. **Celtics win series 4–1.**
- NBA season awards:
  - Sixth Man of the Year: Jamal Crawford, Atlanta Hawks

==== Chess ====
- World Championship in Sofia, Bulgaria
  - Game 3: Veselin Topalov (BUL) (White) drew with Viswanathan Anand (IND) (Black)
    - Series tied 1½–1½.

==== Cycling ====
- UCI ProTour:
  - Tour de Romandie:
    - Prologue: (gold) Marco Pinotti (ITA) (Team HTC–Columbia) 5' 17" (silver) Peter Sagan (SVK) (Liquigas–Doimo) + 1" (bronze) Jérémy Roy (FRA) (Française des Jeux) + 3"

==== Football (soccer) ====
- UEFA Champions League semi-finals, second leg: (first leg score in parentheses)
  - Lyon (France) 0–3 (0–1) (Germany) **Bayern Munich**. Bayern Munich win 4–0 on aggregate.
    - A hat-trick by Ivica Olić puts Bayern Munich in the final for the eighth time in their history and the first since 2001.
- Copa Libertadores Round of 16, first leg:
  - San Luis (Mexico) 0–1 (Argentina) Estudiantes
  - Guadalajara (Mexico) 3–0 (Argentina) Vélez Sársfield
- AFC Champions League group stage, Round 6: (teams in **bold** advance to the round of 16)
  - Group C:
    - Al-Ain (United Arab Emirates) 2–0 (Iran) Sepahan
    - **Al-Shabab** (Saudi Arabia) 2–1 (Uzbekistan) **Pakhtakor**
      - Final standings: Al-Shabab 10 points, Pakhtakor 9, Sepahan 8, Al-Ain 7.
  - Group D:
    - **Mes Kerman** (Iran) 3–1 (Saudi Arabia) **Al-Hilal**
    - Al-Sadd (Qatar) 2–2 (United Arab Emirates) Al-Ahli
      - Final standings: Al-Hilal 11 points, Mes Kerman 9, Al-Sadd 8, Al-Ahli 5.
  - Group G:
    - **Suwon Samsung Bluewings** (South Korea) 6–2 Singapore Armed Forces
    - Henan Construction (China) 1–1 (Japan) **Gamba Osaka**
      - Final standings: Suwon Samsung Bluewings 13 points, Gamba Osaka 12, Singapore Armed Forces 4, Henan Construction 3.
  - Group H:
    - Sanfrecce Hiroshima (Japan) 4–3 (South Korea) **Pohang Steelers**
    - **Adelaide United** (Australia) 0–1 (China) Shandong Luneng
      - Final standings: Adelaide United, Pohang Steelers 10 points, Sanfrecce Hiroshima 9, Shandong Luneng 6.
- AFC Cup group stage, Round 6: (teams in **bold** advance to the round of 16)
  - Group C:
    - Al-Jaish (Syria) 1–1 (Uzbekistan) **Nasaf Qarshi**
    - Al-Ahed (Lebanon) 1–2 (Kuwait) **Kazma**
      - Final standings: Kazma 13 points, Nasaf Qarshi 11, Al-Jaish 8, Al-Ahed 1.
  - Group D:
    - Kingfisher East Bengal (India) 0–4 (Lebanon) Al-Nejmeh
    - **Al-Qadsia** (Kuwait) 3–0 (Syria) **Al-Ittihad**
      - Final standings: Al-Qadsia 14 points, Al-Ittihad, Al-Nejmeh 10, Kingfisher East Bengal 0.
  - Group G:
    - Persiwa Wamena (Indonesia) 2–2 (Thailand) **Muangthong United**
    - **South China** (Hong Kong) 3–1 (Maldives) VB Sports Club
      - Final standings: South China 13 points, Muangthong United 11, VB Sports Club 9, Persiwa Wamena 1.
  - Group H:
    - **Thai Port** (Thailand) 2–0 (Hong Kong) NT Realty Wofoo Tai Po
    - Geylang United (Singapore) 1–1 (Vietnam) **SHB Đà Nẵng**
      - Final standings: SHB Đà Nẵng 14 points, Thai Port 11, Geylang United 4, NT Realty Wofoo Tai Po 2.
- (Northern Ireland) IFA Premiership, matchday 37 of 38:
  - Linfield 1–0 Cliftonville
    - Standings: Linfield 74 points, Cliftonville 66, Glentoran 65, Crusaders 60.
      - Linfield win the championship for the 49th time, and qualify for the Champions League. Cliftonville and Glentoran qualify for the Europa League.

==== Ice hockey ====
- Stanley Cup playoffs (all series best-of-7):
  - Western Conference Quarter-finals:
    - Game 7: (5) Detroit Red Wings 6, (4) Phoenix Coyotes 1. **Red Wings win series 4–3.**

==== Snooker ====
- World Championship in Sheffield, England:
  - Quarter-finals (best of 25 frames):
    - Neil Robertson (AUS) leads Steve Davis (ENG) 12–4
    - Mark Allen (NIR) level with Graeme Dott (SCO) 8–8
    - Shaun Murphy (ENG) leads Ali Carter (ENG) 5–3
    - Mark Selby (ENG) level with Ronnie O'Sullivan (ENG) 4–4

=== April 26, 2010 (Monday) ===
==== Basketball ====
- NBA Playoffs (all series best-of-7):
  - Western Conference First Round:
    - Game 5: Phoenix Suns 107, Portland Trail Blazers 88. Suns lead series 3–2.
  - Eastern Conference First Round:
    - Game 4: Orlando Magic 99, Charlotte Bobcats 90. **Magic win series 4–0.**
    - Game 4: Milwaukee Bucks 111, Atlanta Hawks 104. Series tied 2–2.
- NBA season awards:
  - Sportsmanship Award: Grant Hill, Phoenix Suns

==== Ice hockey ====
- Stanley Cup playoffs (all series best-of-7):
  - Eastern Conference Quarter-finals:
    - Game 6: (6) Boston Bruins 4, (3) Buffalo Sabres 3. **Bruins win series 4–2.**
    - Game 6: (8) Montreal Canadiens 4, (1) Washington Capitals 1. Series tied 3–3.
  - Western Conference Quarter-finals:
    - Game 6: (2) Chicago Blackhawks 5, (7) Nashville Predators 3. **Blackhawks win series 4–2.**

==== Snooker ====
- World Championship in Sheffield, England:
  - Second round (best of 25 frames):
    - Ronnie O'Sullivan (ENG) def. Mark Williams (WAL) 13–10
    - Ali Carter (ENG) def. Joe Perry (ENG) 13–11
    - Mark Selby (ENG) def. Stephen Hendry (SCO) 13–5
    - Shaun Murphy (ENG) def. Ding Junhui (CHN) 13–10

==== Tennis ====
- Fed Cup World Group II play-offs, day 2: (team in **bold** advance to World Group II in 2011)
  - **Sweden** 3–2 China
    - Peng Shuai (CHN) def. Sofia Arvidsson (SWE) 6–7(4), 6–1, 8–6
    - Johanna Larsson (SWE) def. Shuai Zhang (CHN) 2–6, 6–2, 6–3
    - Han Xinyun/Zhou Yi-Miao (CHN) def. Johanna Larsson/Ellen Allgurin (SWE) 6–3, 6–2

=== April 25, 2010 (Sunday) ===
==== Athletics ====
- World Marathon Majors:
  - London Marathon:
    - Men: (gold) Tsegaye Kebede (ETH) 2:05:19 (silver) Emmanuel Mutai (KEN) 2:06:23 (bronze) Jaouad Gharib (MAR) 2:06:55
      - Standings (after 8 of 11 events): (1) Samuel Wanjiru (KEN) & Kebede 50 points (3) Deriba Merga (ETH) & Mutai 35
    - Women: (gold) Liliya Shobukhova (RUS) 2:22:00 (silver) Inga Abitova (RUS) 2:22:19 (bronze) Aselefech Mergia (ETH) 2:22:38
      - Standings: (1) Shobukhova 60 points (2) Irina Mikitenko (GER) 40 points (3) Salina Kosgei (KEN) 36

==== Auto racing ====
- NASCAR Sprint Cup Series:
  - Aaron's 499 in Talladega, Alabama:
    - (1) (California) Kevin Harvick (Chevrolet; Richard Childress Racing) (2) (Missouri) Jamie McMurray (Chevrolet; Earnhardt Ganassi Racing) (3) (Colombia) Juan Pablo Montoya (Chevrolet; Earnhardt Ganassi Racing)
      - Drivers' championship standings (after 9 of 36 races): (1) (California) Jimmie Johnson (Chevrolet, Hendrick Motorsports) 1323 points (2) Harvick 1297 (3) (Washington (state)) Greg Biffle (Ford; Roush Fenway Racing) 1237
- Nationwide Series:
  - Aaron's 312 in Talladega, Alabama:
    - (1) (Michigan) Brad Keselowski (Dodge, Penske Racing) (2) (Connecticut) Joey Logano (Toyota; Joe Gibbs Racing) (3) (California) Kevin Harvick (Chevrolet, Kevin Harvick Incorporated)
      - Drivers' championship standings (after 8 of 35 races): (1) Keselowski 1274 points (2) Harvick 1264 (3) (Nevada) Kyle Busch (Toyota, Joe Gibbs Racing) 1220
        - After the event, Keselowski is docked 50 points for rule infractions, reducing his points tally from 1324 to 1274. (NASCAR)

==== Basketball ====
- NBA Playoffs (all series best-of-7):
  - Western Conference First Round:
    - Game 4: San Antonio Spurs 92, Dallas Mavericks 89. Spurs lead series 3–1.
    - Game 4: Utah Jazz 117, Denver Nuggets 106. Jazz lead series 3–1.
  - Eastern Conference First Round:
    - Game 4: Cleveland Cavaliers 121, Chicago Bulls 98. Cavaliers lead series 3–1.
    - Game 4: Miami Heat 101, Boston Celtics 92. Celtics lead series 3–1.

==== Chess ====
- World Championship in Sofia, Bulgaria
  - Game 2: Viswanathan Anand (IND) (White) def. Veselin Topalov (BUL) (Black)
    - Series tied 1–1.

==== Cycling ====
- Monument Classics:
  - Liège–Bastogne–Liège: (gold) Alexander Vinokourov (KAZ) (Astana) 6h 37' 49" (silver) Alexandr Kolobnev (RUS) (Team Katusha) + 6" (bronze) Alejandro Valverde (ESP) (Caisse d'Epargne) + 1' 04"

==== Equestrianism ====
- Eventing:
  - Rolex Kentucky Three Day in Lexington, Kentucky: (gold) William Fox-Pitt (GBR), horse: Cool Mountain (silver) Phillip Dutton (USA), horse: Woodburn (bronze) Becky Holder (USA), horse: Courageous Comet

==== Football (soccer) ====
- CAF Champions League qualification Second round, first leg:
  - Djoliba (Mali) 0–1 (Democratic Republic of the Congo) TP Mazembe
  - JS Kabylie (Algeria) 2–0 (Angola) Atlético Petróleos Luanda
  - Al-Hilal Omdurman (Sudan) 0–1 (Egypt) Ismaily
  - Dynamos (Zimbabwe) 4–1 (Botswana) Gaborone United
- CAF Confederation Cup Second round, first leg:
  - Simba S.C. (Tanzania) 2–1 (Egypt) Haras El Hodood
  - Petrojet (Egypt) 1–1 (Tunisia) CS Sfaxien
  - AS Vita Club (Democratic Republic of the Congo) 3–0 (Nigeria) Enyimba
  - Warri Wolves (Nigeria) 2–1 (Zimbabwe) CAPS United
- (Scotland) Scottish Premier League, matchday 35 of 38:
  - Dundee United 0–2 Celtic
  - Hibernian 0–1 Rangers
    - Standings: Rangers 83 points, Celtic 72, Dundee United 62.
      - Rangers win the championship for the 53rd time. Both Rangers and Celtic qualify for the Champions League, while Dundee United qualify for Europa League.
- (Netherlands) KNVB Cup Final, first leg:
  - Ajax 2–0 Feyenoord
- (Brazil) Brazilian state championships finals, first leg:
  - (São Paulo (state)) São Paulo: Santo André 2–3 Santos
  - Rio Grande do Sul: Internacional 0–2 Grêmio
  - Ceará: Fortaleza 1–0 Ceará
  - Bahia: Bahia 0–1 Vitória
  - Minas Gerais: Ipatinga 2–3 Atlético Mineiro
  - (Santa Catarina (state)) Santa Catarina: Joinville 1–3 Avaí
  - Goiás: Atlético Goianiense 4–0 Santa Helena EC

==== Golf ====
- PGA Tour:
  - Zurich Classic of New Orleans in New Orleans, Louisiana:
    - Winner: Jason Bohn (USA) 270 (−18)
      - Bohn wins his second PGA Tour title.
- European Tour:
  - Ballantine's Championship in Jeju-do, South Korea:
    - Winner: Marcus Fraser (AUS) 204 (−12)
      - Fraser wins his second European Tour title.
- Champions Tour:
  - Liberty Mutual Legends of Golf in Savannah, Georgia:
    - Winners: Mark O'Meara (USA) & Nick Price (ZIM) 188 (−28)^{PO}
      - O'Meara wins his first Champions Tour title, and Price wins his second title.

==== Gymnastics ====
- European Men's Artistic Gymnastics Championships in Birmingham, United Kingdom:
  - Seniors:
    - Floor: (gold) Matthias Fahrig (GER) (silver) Eleftherios Kosmidis (GRE) (bronze) Daniel Purvis (GBR) (bronze) Marcel Nguyen (GER)
    - Pommel horse: (gold) Daniel Keatings (GBR) (silver) Louis Smith (GBR) (bronze) Sašo Bertoncelj (SLO)
    - Rings: (gold) Matteo Morandi (ITA) (silver) Samir Aït Saïd (FRA) (bronze) Yordan Yovchev (BUL)
    - Vault: (gold) Tomi Tuuha (FIN) (silver) Fahrig (bronze) Flavius Koczi (ROU)
    - Parallel bars: (gold) Yann Cucherat (FRA) (silver) Vasileios Tsolakidis (GRE) (bronze) Adam Kierzkowski (POL) (bronze) Hamilton Sabot (FRA)
    - Horizontal bar: (gold) Vlasios Maras (GRE) (silver) Epke Zonderland (NED) (bronze) Philipp Boy (GER) (bronze) Fabian Hambuechen (GER)
  - Juniors:
    - Floor: (gold) Max Whitlock (GBR) (silver) Volkaert Siemon (BEL) (silver) Adelin Ladislau Kotrong (ROU)
    - Pommel horse: (gold) Whitlock (silver) Oliver Hegi (SUI) (bronze) Daniel Weinert (GER) (bronze) Artur Davtyan (ARM)
    - Rings: (gold) Néstor Abad (ESP) (silver) Stephen Micholet (FRA) (bronze) Reiss Beckforf (GBR)
    - Vault: (gold) Davtyan (silver) Fabián González (ESP) (bronze) Marco Lodadio (ITA)
    - Parallel bars: (gold) Andrei Vasile Muntean (ROU) (silver) Hegi (bronze) Eddy Yusof (SUI)
    - Horizontal bar: (gold) Sam Oldham (GBR) (silver) Hegi (bronze) Gonzalez (bronze) Beckford

==== Ice hockey ====
- Stanley Cup playoffs (all series best-of-7):
  - Western Conference Quarter-finals:
    - Game 6: (4) Phoenix Coyotes 5, (5) Detroit Red Wings 2. Series tied 3–3.
    - Game 6: (3) Vancouver Canucks 4, (6) Los Angeles Kings 2. **Canucks win series 4–2.**

==== Judo ====
- European Championships in Vienna, Austria:
  - Women Teams: (gold) Italy (silver) Poland (bronze) France (bronze) Ukraine
  - Men Teams: (gold) Georgia (silver) France (bronze) Russia (bronze) Romania

==== Motorcycle racing ====
- Superbike:
  - Assen Superbike World Championship round in Assen, Netherlands:
    - Race 1: (1) Jonathan Rea (GBR) (Honda CBR1000RR) (2) James Toseland (GBR) (Yamaha YZF-R1) (3) Leon Camier (GBR) (Aprilia RSV4 1000)
    - Race 2: (1) Rea (2) Leon Haslam (GBR) (Suzuki GSX-R1000) (3) Toseland
      - Riders' standings (after 4 of 13 rounds): (1) Haslam 148 points (2) Max Biaggi (ITA) (Aprilia RSV4 1000) 128 (3) Rea 110
      - Manufacturers' standings: (1) Suzuki 148 (2) Aprilia 134 (3) Ducati 130
- Supersport:
  - Assen Supersport World Championship round in Assen, Netherlands:
    - (1) Eugene Laverty (IRL) (Honda CBR600RR) (2) Joan Lascorz (ESP) (Kawasaki ZX-6R) (3) Kenan Sofuoğlu (TUR) (Honda CBR600RR)
      - Riders' standings (after 4 of 13 rounds): (1) Lascorz 85 points (2) Sofuoğlu 77 (3) Laverty 66
      - Manufacturers' standings: (1) Honda 95 (2) Kawasaki 85 (3) Triumph 55

==== Snooker ====
- World Championship in Sheffield, England:
  - Second round (best of 25 frames):
    - Mark Williams (WAL) level with Ronnie O'Sullivan (ENG) 8–8
    - Ali Carter (ENG) leads Joe Perry (ENG) 10–6
    - Ding Junhui (CHN) leads Shaun Murphy (ENG) 5–3
    - Mark Selby (ENG) level with Stephen Hendry (SCO) 4–4

==== Tennis ====
- ATP World Tour:
  - Barcelona Open Banco Sabadell in Barcelona, Spain:
    - Final: **Fernando Verdasco** (ESP) def. Robin Söderling (SWE) 6–3, 4–6, 6–3
      - Verdasco wins the fifth title of his career.
- Fed Cup World Group Semifinals, day 2: (teams in **bold** advance to the final)
  - **Italy** 5–0 Czech Republic
    - Flavia Pennetta (ITA) def. Petra Kvitová (CZE) 7–6(3), 6–2
    - Sara Errani (ITA) def. Lucie Hradecká (CZE) 6–4, 6–2
    - Sara Errani/Francesca Schiavone (ITA) def. Lucie Hradecká/Květa Peschke (CZE) 6–2, 6–4
  - **United States** 3–2 Russia
    - Elena Dementieva (RUS) def. Melanie Oudin (USA) 7–6(4), 0–6, 6–3
    - Bethanie Mattek-Sands (USA) def. Ekaterina Makarova (RUS) 6–4, 2–6, 6–3
    - Liezel Huber/Bethanie Mattek-Sands (USA) def. Elena Dementieva/Alla Kudryavtseva (RUS) 6–3, 6–1
      - USA will host reigning champion Italy in a repeat of last year's final.
- Fed Cup World Group play-offs, day 2: (teams in **bold** advance to the World Group in 2011)
  - **Belgium** 3–2 Estonia
    - Kaia Kanepi (EST) def. Justine Henin (BEL) 6–7(6), 6–4, 6–3
    - Yanina Wickmayer (BEL) def. Maret Ani (EST) 2–6, 6–1, 6–1
    - Maret Ani/Margit Rüütel (EST) def. Kirsten Flipkens/Yanina Wickmayer (BEL) 2–6, 6–4, 6–3
  - Ukraine 0–5 **Australia**
    - Samantha Stosur (AUS) def. Lyudmyla Kichenok (UKR) 7–6(3), 6–3
    - Alicia Molik (AUS) def. Mariya Koryttseva (UKR) 2–6, 6–2, 7–5
    - Rennae Stubbs/Anastasia Rodionova (AUS) def. Lyudmyla Kichenok/Nadiia Kichenok (UKR) 6–2, 6–7(2), 6–1
  - Germany 2–3 **France**
    - Andrea Petkovic (GER) def. Aravane Rezaï (FRA) 6–1, 7–6(2)
    - Pauline Parmentier (FRA) def. Tatjana Malek (GER) 7–6(4), 6–4
    - Julie Coin/Alizé Cornet (FRA) def. Kristina Barrois/Andrea Petkovic (GER) 6–3, 6–1
  - Serbia 2–3 **Slovakia**
    - Daniela Hantuchová (SVK) def. Jelena Janković (SRB) 7–6(2), 7–5
    - Bojana Jovanovski (SRB) def. Magdaléna Rybáriková (SVK) 6–1, 7–6(4)
    - Daniela Hantuchová/Magdaléna Rybáriková (SVK) def. Jelena Janković/Ana Jovanović (SRB) 6–4, 6–3
- Fed Cup World Group II play-offs, day 2: (teams in **bold** advance to World Group II in 2011)
  - Poland 1–4 **Spain**
    - María José Martínez Sánchez (ESP) def. Agnieszka Radwańska (POL) 6–3, 6–4
    - Carla Suárez Navarro (ESP) def. Marta Domachowska (POL) 6–3, 6–2
    - Nuria Llagostera Vives/Arantxa Parra Santonja (ESP) def. Klaudia Jans/Alicja Rosolska (POL) 6–2, 6–4
  - **Canada** 5–0 Argentina
    - Aleksandra Wozniak (CAN) def. Jorgelina Cravero (ARG) 6–4, 6–4
    - Valérie Tétreault (CAN) def. Paula Ormaechea (ARG) 6–7(6), 6–1, 6–1
    - Sharon Fichman/Marie-Ève Pelletier (CAN) def. Jorgelina Cravero/Aranza Salut (ARG) 6–4, 6–2
  - **Slovenia** 4–1 Japan
    - Kimiko Date-Krumm (JPN) def. Polona Hercog (SLO) 6–4, 6–2
    - Katarina Srebotnik (SLO) def. Ayumi Morita (JPN) 6–1, 6–4
    - Tadeja Majerič/Maša Zec Peškirič (SLO) def. Rika Fujiwara/Yurika Sema (JPN) 6–4, 6–7(1), 6–3
- Fed Cup World Group II play-offs, day 1:
  - Sweden 2–0 China
    - Johanna Larsson (SWE) def. Peng Shuai (CHN) 6–2, 6–4
    - Sofia Arvidsson (SWE) def. Shuai Zhang (CHN) 6–4, 6–3

=== April 24, 2010 (Saturday) ===
==== Auto racing ====
- Nationwide Series:
  - Aaron's 312 in Talladega, Alabama: Postponed to April 25 due to the threat of severe weather.

==== Basketball ====
- NBA Playoffs (all series best-of-7):
  - Western Conference First Round:
    - Game 4: Portland Trail Blazers 96, Phoenix Suns 87. Series tied 2–2.
    - Game 4: Oklahoma City Thunder 110, Los Angeles Lakers 89. Series tied 2–2.
  - Eastern Conference First Round:
    - Game 3: Orlando Magic 90, Charlotte Bobcats 86. Magic lead series 3–0.
    - Game 3: Milwaukee Bucks 107, Atlanta Hawks 89. Hawks lead series 2–1.
- NBA season awards:
  - Executive of the Year: John Hammond, Milwaukee Bucks

==== Chess ====
- World Championship in Sofia, Bulgaria
  - Game 1: Veselin Topalov (BUL) (White) def. Viswanathan Anand (IND) (Black)
    - Topalov lead series 1–0.

==== Curling ====
- World Mixed Doubles Championship in Chelyabinsk, Russia:
  - Bronze medal game: Spain 7–8 (bronze) China
  - Gold medal game: (silver) New Zealand 7–9 (gold) Russia

==== Football (soccer) ====
- CAF Champions League qualification Second round, first leg:
  - ES Sétif (Algeria) 1–0 (Zambia) Zanaco
  - Supersport United (South Africa) 0–0 (Nigeria) Heartland
- CAF Confederation Cup Second round, first leg:
  - Cotonsport (Cameroon) 1–2 (Angola) Primeiro de Agosto
  - ASFAN (Niger) 1–0 (Democratic Republic of the Congo) DC Motema Pembe
- (Greece) Greek Cup Final in Athens:
  - **Panathinaikos** 1–0 Aris
    - Panathinaikos win the Cup for the 17th time.

==== Gymnastics ====
- European Men's Artistic Gymnastics Championships in Birmingham, United Kingdom:
  - Senior team: (gold) Germany (silver) United Kingdom (bronze) France
  - Junior all round: (gold) Sam Oldham (GBR) (silver) Max Whitlock (GBR) (bronze) Pablo Braegger (SUI)

==== Ice hockey ====
- Stanley Cup playoffs (all series best-of-7):
  - Eastern Conference Quarter-finals:
    - Game 6: (4) Pittsburgh Penguins 4, (5) Ottawa Senators 3. **Penguins wins series 4–2.**
  - Western Conference Quarter-finals:
    - Game 5: (2) Chicago Blackhawks 5, (7) Nashville Predators 4 (OT). Blackhawks lead series 3–2.
    - Game 6: (1) San Jose Sharks 5, (8) Colorado Avalanche 2. **Sharks wins series 4–2.**

==== Judo ====
- European Championships in Vienna, Austria:
  - Women −78 kg: (gold) Abigel Joo (HUN) (silver) Marhinde Verkerk (NLD) (bronze) Lucie Louette (FRA) (bronze) Maryna Pryshchepa (UKR)
  - Women +78 kg: (gold) Lucija Polavder (SVN) (silver) Tea Donguzashvili (RUS) (bronze) Karina Bryant (GBR) (bronze) Urszula Sadkowska (POL)
  - Men −90 kg: (gold) Marcus Nyman (SWE) (silver) Varlam Liparteliani (GEO) (bronze) Ilias Of Nikos Iliadis (GRE) (bronze) Elkhan Mammadov (AZE)
  - Men −100 kg: (gold) Elco van der Geest (BEL) (silver) Henk Grol (NED) (bronze) Benjamin Behrla (GER) (bronze) Ariel Ze'evi (ISR)
  - Men +100 kg: (gold) Ihar Makarau (BLR) (silver) Barna Bor (HUN) (bronze) Janusz Wojnarowicz (POL) (bronze) Andreas Tölzer (GER)

==== Rugby union ====
- 2011 Rugby World Cup qualifying:
  - Asian Five Nations:
    - Hong Kong 32–8 South Korea in Hong Kong
    - Kazakhstan 43–28 Arabian Gulf in Almaty
- In Division 3A of the European Nations Cup, Lithuania defeat Serbia 77–5 for their 18th consecutive Test win, breaking the previous record of 17 first set by New Zealand in 1965–69 and tied by South Africa in 1997–98. (International Rugby Board)

==== Snooker ====
- World Championship in Sheffield, England:
  - Second round (best of 25 frames):
    - Steve Davis (ENG) def. John Higgins (SCO) 13–11
    - Neil Robertson (AUS) def. Martin Gould (ENG) 13–12
    - Graeme Dott (SCO) def. Stephen Maguire (SCO) 13–6
    - Mark Williams (WAL) level with Ronnie O'Sullivan (ENG) 4–4
    - Ali Carter (ENG) level with Joe Perry (ENG) 4–4

==== Tennis ====
- Fed Cup World Group Semifinals, day 1:
  - Italy 2–0 Czech Republic
    - Flavia Pennetta (ITA) def. Lucie Hradecká (CZE) 6–4, 7–5
    - Francesca Schiavone (ITA) def. Lucie Šafářová (CZE) 6–0, 6–2
  - United States 1–1 Russia
    - Melanie Oudin (USA) def. Alla Kudryavtseva (RUS) 6–3, 6–3
    - Elena Dementieva (RUS) def. Bethanie Mattek-Sands (USA) 6–4, 6–3
- Fed Cup World Group play-offs, day 1:
  - Belgium 2–0 Estonia
    - Kim Clijsters (BEL) def. Maret Ani (EST) 6–4, 6–2
    - Yanina Wickmayer (BEL) def. Kaia Kanepi (EST) 6–2, 4–6, 6–1
  - Ukraine 0–2 Australia
    - Anastasia Rodionova (AUS) def. Alona Bondarenko (UKR) 0–6, 6–3, 7–5
    - Samantha Stosur (AUS) def. Mariya Koryttseva (UKR) 6–3, 6–0
  - Germany 1–1 France
    - Andrea Petkovic (GER) def. Pauline Parmentier (FRA) 6–3, 6–2
    - Aravane Rezaï (FRA) def. Tatjana Malek (GER) 2–6, 6–3, 6–0
  - Serbia 1–1 Slovakia
    - Jelena Janković (SRB) def. Magdaléna Rybáriková (SVK) 7–6(5), 6–3
    - Daniela Hantuchová (SVK) def. Bojana Jovanovski (SRB) 6–2, 6–2
- Fed Cup World Group II play-offs, day 1:
  - Poland 1–1 Spain
    - Agnieszka Radwańska (POL) def. Carla Suárez Navarro (ESP) 6–3, 6–1
    - María José Martínez Sánchez (ESP) def. Marta Domachowska (POL) 7–6(4), 6–2
  - Canada 2–0 Argentina
    - Aleksandra Wozniak (CAN) def. Paula Ormaechea (ARG) 6–4, 6–2
    - Valérie Tétreault (CAN) def. Jorgelina Cravero (ARG) 6–4, 6–3
  - Slovenia 2–0 Japan
    - Katarina Srebotnik (SLO) def. Kimiko Date-Krumm (JPN) 7–5, 6–1
    - Polona Hercog (SLO) def. Ayumi Morita (JPN) 3–6, 6–1, 6–3

=== April 23, 2010 (Friday) ===
==== Basketball ====
- NBA Playoffs (all series best-of-7):
  - Western Conference First Round:
    - Game 3: San Antonio Spurs 94, Dallas Mavericks 90. Spurs lead series 2–1.
    - Game 3: Utah Jazz 105, Denver Nuggets 93. Jazz lead series 2–1.
  - Eastern Conference First Round:
    - Game 3: Boston Celtics 100, Miami Heat 98. Celtics lead series 3–0.

==== Football (soccer) ====
- CAF Champions League qualification Second round, first leg:
  - Espérance ST (Tunisia) 3–0 (Sudan) Al-Merreikh
  - Ittihad (Libya) 2–0 (Egypt) Al-Ahly
- CAF Confederation Cup Second round, first leg:
  - Amal Atbara (Sudan) 1–0 (Algeria) CR Belouizdad
  - FUS Rabat (Morocco) 2–0 (Mali) Stade Malien

==== Golf ====
- Lorena Ochoa, currently ranked #1 in women's golf, announces that she will retire from the sport after next week's Tres Marias Championship in her home country of Mexico. The 28-year-old Ochoa, with 27 LPGA Tour titles including two majors, indicated that she wanted to raise a family. (AP via ESPN)

==== Ice hockey ====
- Stanley Cup playoffs (all series best-of-7):
  - Eastern Conference Quarter-finals:
    - Game 5: (3) Buffalo Sabres 4, (6) Boston Bruins 1. Bruins lead series 3–2.
    - Game 5: (8) Montreal Canadiens 2, (1) Washington Capitals 1. Capitals lead series 3–2.
  - Western Conference Quarter-finals:
    - Game 5: (3) Vancouver Canucks 7, (6) Los Angeles Kings 2. Canucks lead series 3–2.
    - Game 5: (5) Detroit Red Wings 4, (4) Phoenix Coyotes 1. Red Wings lead series 3–2.

==== Judo ====
- European Championships in Vienna, Austria:
  - Women −63 kg: (gold) Elisabeth Willeboordse (NED) (silver) Edwige Gwend (ITA) (bronze) Vlora Bedzeti (SLO) (bronze) Vera Koval (RUS)
  - Women −70 kg: (gold) Anett Mészáros (HUN) (silver) Raša Sraka (SLO) (bronze) Cecilia Blanco (ESP) (bronze) Juliane Robra (SUI)
  - Men −73 kg: (gold) João Pina (POR) (silver) Batradz Kaitmazov (RUS) (bronze) Ugo Legrand (FRA) (bronze) Attila Ungvari (HUN)
  - Men −81 kg: (gold) Sirazhudin Magomedov (RUS) (silver) Aliaksandr Stsiashenka (BLR) (bronze) Euan Burton (GBR) (bronze) Guillaume Elmont (NED)

==== Snooker ====
- World Championship in Sheffield, England:
  - Second round (best of 25 frames):
    - Mark Allen (NIR) def. Mark Davis (ENG) 13–5
    - Steve Davis (ENG) leads John Higgins (SCO) 9–7
    - Martin Gould (ENG) leads Neil Robertson (AUS) 11–5
    - Graeme Dott (SCO) leads Stephen Maguire (SCO) 7–1

=== April 22, 2010 (Thursday) ===
==== American football ====
- Oklahoma Sooners quarterback Sam Bradford is selected as the number one overall pick by the St. Louis Rams in the NFL draft in New York City.

==== Basketball ====
- NBA Playoffs (all series best-of-7):
  - Western Conference First Round:
    - Game 3: Oklahoma City Thunder 101, Los Angeles Lakers 96. Lakers lead series 2–1.
    - Game 3: Phoenix Suns 108, Portland Trail Blazers 89. Suns lead series 2–1.
  - Eastern Conference First Round:
    - Game 3: Chicago Bulls 108, Cleveland Cavaliers 106. Cavaliers lead series 2–1.
- NBA season awards:
  - Most Improved Player: Aaron Brooks, Houston Rockets

==== Darts ====
- Premier League round 11 in Liverpool, England: (players in **bold** advance to semifinals, players in ~~strike~~ are eliminated)
  - Terry Jenkins (ENG) 8–4 Ronnie Baxter (ENG)
  - James Wade (ENG) 8–3 ~~Raymond van Barneveld~~ (NED)
  - Adrian Lewis (ENG) 3–8 Mervyn King (ENG)
  - **Phil Taylor** (ENG) 8–5 Simon Whitlock (AUS)
    - High Checkout: Taylor 125
      - Standings after 11 rounds: Taylor 20 points, King 13, Wade, Baxter, Whitlock 11, Lewis 9, Jenkins 8, Barneveld 5.

==== Football (soccer) ====
- UEFA Europa League semi-finals, first leg:
  - Hamburg (Germany) 0–0 (England) Fulham
  - Atlético Madrid (Spain) 1–0 (England) Liverpool
- Copa Libertadores Second Stage: (teams in **bold** advance to the round of 16, teams in ~~strike~~ are eliminated)
  - Group 1:
    - ~~Cerro Porteño~~ (Paraguay) 0–0 (Uruguay) ~~Racing~~
    - **Corinthians** (Brazil) 1–0 (Colombia) ~~Independiente Medellín~~
    - Final standings: Corinthians 16 points, Racing 8, Independiente Medellín 6, Cerro Porteňo 2.
  - Group 5:
    - **Internacional** (Brazil) 3–0 (Ecuador) ~~Deportivo Quito~~
    - ~~Cerro~~ (Uruguay) 0–0 (Ecuador) ~~Emelec~~
    - Final standings: Internacional 12 points, Deportivo Quito 10, Cerro 8, Emelec 2.

==== Ice hockey ====
- Stanley Cup playoffs (all series best-of-7):
  - Eastern Conference Quarter-finals:
    - Game 5: (7) Philadelphia Flyers 3, (2) New Jersey Devils 0. **Flyers win series 4–1.**
    - Game 5: (5) Ottawa Senators 4, (4) Pittsburgh Penguins 3 (3 OT). Penguins lead series 3–2.
  - Western Conference Quarter-finals:
    - Game 4: (2) Chicago Blackhawks 3, (7) Nashville Predators 0. Series tied 2–2.
    - Game 5: (1) San Jose Sharks 5, (8) Colorado Avalanche 0. Sharks lead series 3–2.

==== Judo ====
- European Championships in Vienna, Austria:
  - Women −48 kg: (gold) Alina Dumitru (ROU) (silver) Eva Csernoviczky (HUN) (bronze) Oiana Blanco (ESP) (bronze) Charline Van Snick (BEL)
  - Women −52 kg: (gold) Natalia Kuzyutina (RUS) (silver) Rosalba Forciniti (ITA) (bronze) Ilse Heylen (BEL) (bronze) Pénélope Bonna (FRA)
  - Women −57 kg: (gold) Corina Caprioriu (ROU) (silver) Sabrina Filzmoser (AUT) (bronze) Hedvig Karakas (HUN) (bronze) Telma Monteiro (POR)
  - Men −60 kg: (gold) Sofiane Milous (FRA) (silver) Ludwig Paischer (AUT) (bronze) Jeroen Mooren (NED) (bronze) Elio Verde (ITA)
  - Men −66 kg: (gold) Sugoi Uriarte (ESP) (silver) Miklos Ungvari (HUN) (bronze) Rok Draksic (SLO) (bronze) Andreas Mitterfellner (AUT)

==== Snooker ====
- World Championship in Sheffield, England:
  - First round (best of 19 frames):
    - Shaun Murphy (ENG) def. Gerard Greene (NIR) 10–7
    - Stephen Maguire (SCO) def. Stephen Lee (ENG) 10–4
  - Second round (best of 25 frames):
    - Mark Allen (NIR) leads Mark Davis (ENG) 5–3
    - Steve Davis (ENG) leads John Higgins (SCO) 6–2

=== April 21, 2010 (Wednesday) ===
==== American football ====
- The National Football League suspends Pittsburgh Steelers quarterback Ben Roethlisberger for the first six games of the 2010 regular season in the wake of his alleged sexual assault in Georgia. (ESPN)

==== Basketball ====
- NBA Playoffs (all series best-of-7):
  - Western Conference First Round:
    - Game 2: San Antonio Spurs 102, Dallas Mavericks 88. Series tied 1–1.
  - Eastern Conference First Round:
    - Game 2: Orlando Magic 92, Charlotte Bobcats 77. Magic lead series 2–0.
- NBA season awards:
  - Coach of the Year: Scott Brooks, Oklahoma City Thunder

==== Cycling ====
- La Flèche Wallonne: (gold) Cadel Evans (AUS) (CCC Pro Team) 4:39:24 (silver) Joaquim Rodríguez (ESP) s.t. (Team Katusha–Alpecin) (bronze) Alberto Contador (ESP) (XDS Astana Team) s.t.

==== Football (soccer) ====
- UEFA Champions League semi-finals, first leg:
  - Bayern Munich (Germany) 1–0 (France) Lyon
- Copa Libertadores Second Stage: (teams in **bold** advance to the round of 16, teams in ~~strike~~ are eliminated)
  - Group 2:
    - ~~Nacional~~ (Paraguay) 2–0 (Mexico) ~~Monterrey~~
    - **São Paulo** (Brazil) 1–0 (Colombia) **Once Caldas**
    - Final standings: São Paulo 13, Once Caldas 11 points, Monterrey 6, Nacional 3.
  - Group 6:
    - **Nacional** (Uruguay) 2–0 (Mexico) ~~Morelia~~
    - **Banfield** (Argentina) 4–1 (Ecuador) ~~Deportivo Cuenca~~
      - Final standings: Nacional 12 points, Banfield 11, Morelia 5, Deportivo Cuenca 4.
  - Group 8:
    - **Universidad de Chile** 0–0 ~~Universidad Católica~~
    - Flamengo (Brazil) 3–2 (Venezuela) ~~Caracas~~
      - Final standings: Universidad de Chile 12 points, Flamengo 10, Universidad Católica 7, Caracas 2.
- AFC Cup group stage, Round 5: (teams in **bold** advance to the round of 16, teams in ~~strike~~ are eliminated)
  - Group A:
    - **Shabab Al-Ordon** (Jordan) 6–1 (Yemen) ~~Al-Ahli~~
    - ~~Saham~~ (Oman) 1–4 (Syria) **Al-Karamah**
      - Standings (after 5 matches): Al-Karamah 13 points, Shabab Al-Ordon 11, Saham 4, Al-Ahli 0.
  - Group B: ~~Al-Hilal~~ (Yemen) 0–2 **Al-Kuwait**
    - Standings: **Churchill Brothers** 7 points (3 matches), Al-Kuwait 5 (3), Al-Hilal 1 (4).
  - Group E:
    - **Al-Rayyan** (Qatar) 3–0 (Jordan) ~~Al-Wihdat~~
    - **Al-Riffa** (Bahrain) 1–0 (Oman) ~~Al-Nahda~~
      - Standings (after 5 matches): Al-Rayyan, Al-Riffa 12 points, Al-Wihdat 6, Al-Nahda 0.
  - Group F:
    - **Sriwijaya** (Indonesia) 5–0 (Maldives) ~~Victory SC~~
    - **Bình Dương** (Vietnam) 4–0 (Malaysia) ~~Selangor~~
      - Standings (after 5 matches): Sriwijaya, Bình Dương 10 points, Selangor 4, Victory SC 4.
- CONCACAF Champions League Final, first leg:
  - Cruz Azul (Mexico) 2–1 (Mexico) Pachuca
- (Croatia) Croatian Cup Final, first leg:
  - Hajduk Split 2–1 Šibenik

==== Ice hockey ====
- Stanley Cup playoffs (all series best-of-7):
  - Eastern Conference Quarter-finals:
    - Game 4: (1) Washington Capitals 6, (8) Montreal Canadiens 3. Capitals lead series 3–1.
    - Game 4: (6) Boston Bruins 3, (3) Buffalo Sabres 2 (2OT). Bruins lead series 3–1.
  - Western Conference Quarter-finals:
    - Game 4: (3) Vancouver Canucks 6, (6) Los Angeles Kings 4. Series tied 2–2.

==== Snooker ====
- World Championship in Sheffield, England:
  - First round (best of 19 frames):
    - Ding Junhui (CHN) def. Stuart Pettman (ENG) 10–1
    - Mark Davis (ENG) def. Ryan Day (WAL) 10–8
    - Neil Robertson (AUS) def. Fergal O'Brien (IRL) 10–5
    - Graeme Dott (SCO) def. Peter Ebdon (ENG) 10–5
    - Stephen Maguire (SCO) leads Stephen Lee (ENG) 6–3
    - Shaun Murphy (ENG) leads Gerard Greene (NIR) 8–1

=== April 20, 2010 (Tuesday) ===
==== Basketball ====
- NBA Playoffs (all series best-of-7):
  - Western Conference First Round:
    - Game 2: Los Angeles Lakers 95, Oklahoma City Thunder 92. Lakers lead series 2–0.
    - Game 2: Phoenix Suns 119, Portland Trail Blazers 90. Series tied 1–1.
  - Eastern Conference First Round:
    - Game 2: Atlanta Hawks 96, Milwaukee Bucks 86. Hawks lead series 2–0.
    - Game 2: Boston Celtics 106, Miami Heat 77. Celtics lead series 2–0.
- NBA season awards:
  - Defensive Player of the Year: Dwight Howard, Orlando Magic

==== Football (soccer) ====
- UEFA Champions League semi-finals, first leg:
  - Internazionale (Italy) 3–1 (Spain) Barcelona
- Copa Libertadores Second Stage: (teams in **bold** advance to the round of 16, teams in ~~strike~~ are eliminated)
  - Group 3:
    - ~~Bolívar~~ (Bolivia) 2–0 (Peru) ~~Juan Aurich~~
    - **Estudiantes** (Argentina) 1–0 (Peru) **Alianza Lima**
      - Final standings: Estudiantes 13 points, Alianza Lima 12, Juan Aurich 6, Bolívar 4.
- AFC Cup group stage, Round 5: (teams in **bold** advance to the round of 16, teams in ~~strike~~ are eliminated)
  - Group C:
    - Nasaf Qarshi (Uzbekistan) 4–0 (Lebanon) ~~Al-Ahed~~
    - **Kazma** (Kuwait) 0–1 (Syria) Al-Jaish
      - Standings (after 5 matches): Kazma, Nasaf Qarshi 10 points, Al-Jaish 7, Al-Ahed 1.
  - Group D:
    - **Al-Ittihad** (Syria) 2–1 (India) ~~Kingfisher East Bengal~~
    - ~~Al-Nejmeh~~ (Lebanon) 1–3 (Kuwait) **Al-Qadsia**
      - Standings (after 5 matches): Al-Qadsia 11 points, Al-Ittihad 10, Al-Nejmeh 7, Kingfisher East Bengal 0.
  - Group G:
    - VB Sports Club (Maldives) 4–0 (Indonesia) ~~Persiwa Wamena~~
    - Muangthong United (Thailand) 0–1 (Hong Kong) South China
      - Standings (after 5 matches): South China, Muangthong United 10 points, VB Sports Club 9, Persiwa Wamena 0.
  - Group H:
    - **SHB Đà Nẵng** (Vietnam) 0–0 (Thailand) **Thai Port**
    - ~~NT Realty Wofoo Tai Po~~ (Hong Kong) 1–1 (Singapore) ~~Geylang United~~
      - Standings (after 5 matches): SHB Đà Nẵng 13 points, Thai Port 8, Geylang United 3, NT Realty Wofoo Tai Po 2.

==== Ice hockey ====
- Stanley Cup playoffs (all series best-of-7):
  - Eastern Conference Quarter-finals:
    - Game 4: (4) Pittsburgh Penguins 7, (5) Ottawa Senators 4. Penguins lead series 3–1.
    - Game 4: (7) Philadelphia Flyers 4, (2) New Jersey Devils 1. Flyers lead series 3–1.
  - Western Conference Quarter-finals:
    - Game 4: (5) Detroit Red Wings 3, (4) Phoenix Coyotes 0. Series tied 2–2.
    - Game 3: (7) Nashville Predators 4, (2) Chicago Blackhawks 1. Predators lead series 2–1.
    - Game 4: (1) San Jose Sharks 2, (8) Colorado Avalanche 1 (OT). Series tied 2–2.

==== Snooker ====
- World Championship in Sheffield, England:
  - First round (best of 19 frames):
    - Ronnie O'Sullivan (ENG) def. Liang Wenbo (CHN) 10–7
    - Steve Davis (ENG) def. Mark King (ENG) 10–9
    - Ding Junhui (CHN) leads Stuart Pettman (ENG) 8–1
    - Mark Davis (ENG) leads Ryan Day (WAL) 5–4
    - Neil Robertson (AUS) leads Fergal O'Brien (IRL) 6–3
    - Graeme Dott (SCO) leads Peter Ebdon (ENG) 7–2

=== April 19, 2010 (Monday) ===
==== Athletics ====
- World Marathon Majors:
  - Boston Marathon:
    - Men: (gold) Robert Kiprono Cheruiyot (KEN) 2:05:52 (course record) (silver) Tekeste Kebede (ETH) 2:07:23 (bronze) Deriba Merga (ETH) 2:08:39
    - Women: (gold) Teyba Erkesso (ETH) 2:26:11 (silver) Tatyana Pushkareva (RUS) 2:26:14 (bronze) Salina Kosgei (KEN) 2:28:35

==== Auto racing ====
- NASCAR Sprint Cup Series:
  - Samsung Mobile 500 in Fort Worth, Texas:
    - (1) (Virginia) Denny Hamlin (Toyota; Joe Gibbs Racing) (2) (California) Jimmie Johnson (Chevrolet; Hendrick Motorsports) (3) (Nevada) Kyle Busch (Toyota, Joe Gibbs Racing)
      - Drivers' championship standings (after 8 of 36 races): (1) Johnson 1248 points (2) (Wisconsin) Matt Kenseth (Ford; Roush Fenway Racing) 1140 (3) (Washington (state)) Greg Biffle (Ford, Roush Fenway Racing) 1120
- Nationwide Series:
  - O'Reilly 300 in Fort Worth, Texas:
    - (1) (Nevada) Kyle Busch (Toyota, Joe Gibbs Racing) (2) (Connecticut) Joey Logano (Toyota, Joe Gibbs Racing) (3) (Georgia (U.S. state)) Reed Sorenson (Toyota, Braun Racing)
      - Standings (after 7 of 35 races): (1) Busch 1154 points (2) (Michigan) Brad Keselowski (Dodge, Penske Racing) 1134 (3) (California) Kevin Harvick (Chevrolet, Kevin Harvick Incorporated) 1089

==== Basketball ====
- NBA Playoffs (all series best-of-7):
  - Western Conference First Round:
    - Game 2: (4) Utah Jazz 114, (5) Denver Nuggets 111. Series tied 1–1.
  - Eastern Conference First Round:
    - Game 2: (1) Cleveland Cavaliers 112, (8) Chicago Bulls 102. Cavaliers lead series 2–0.
- NBA season awards:
  - J. Walter Kennedy Citizenship Award: Samuel Dalembert, Philadelphia 76ers

==== Ice hockey ====
- Stanley Cup playoffs (all series best-of-7):
  - Eastern Conference Quarter-finals:
    - Game 3: (1) Washington Capitals 5, (8) Montreal Canadiens 1. Capitals lead series 2–1.
    - Game 3: (6) Boston Bruins 2, (3) Buffalo Sabres 1. Bruins lead series 2–1.
  - Western Conference Quarter-finals:
    - Game 3: (6) Los Angeles Kings 5, (3) Vancouver Canucks 3. Kings lead series 2–1.

==== Snooker ====
- World Championship in Sheffield, England:
  - First round (best of 19 frames):
    - Martin Gould (ENG) def. Marco Fu (HKG) 10–9
    - Ali Carter (ENG) def. Jamie Cope (ENG) 10–4
    - Mark Williams (WAL) def. Marcus Campbell (SCO) 10–5
    - Ronnie O'Sullivan (ENG) leads Liang Wenbo (CHN) 7–2
    - Mark King (ENG) leads Steve Davis (ENG) 5–4

=== April 18, 2010 (Sunday) ===
==== Auto racing ====
- Formula One:
  - Chinese Grand Prix in Shanghai, China:
    - (1) Jenson Button (GBR) (McLaren–Mercedes) (2) Lewis Hamilton (GBR) (McLaren-Mercedes) (3) Nico Rosberg (GER) (Mercedes)
      - Drivers' championship standings (after 4 of 19 races): (1) Button 60 points (2) Rosberg 50 (3) Fernando Alonso (ESP) (Ferrari) & Hamilton 49
      - Constructors' championship standings: (1) McLaren 109 (2) Ferrari 90 (3) Red Bull (AUT) 73
- NASCAR Sprint Cup Series:
  - Samsung Mobile 500 in Fort Worth, Texas: Race is postponed to Monday due to rain.
- Nationwide Series:
  - O'Reilly 300 in Fort Worth, Texas: Race is postponed to Monday due to rain.
- IndyCar Series:
  - Toyota Grand Prix of Long Beach in Long Beach, California:
    - (1) Ryan Hunter-Reay (USA) (Andretti Autosport) (2) Justin Wilson (GBR) (Dreyer & Reinbold Racing) (3) Will Power (AUS) (Team Penske)
      - Drivers' championship standings (after 4 of 17 races): (1) Power 172 points (2) Hélio Castroneves (BRA) (Team Penske) 130 (3) Hunter-Reay 129
- V8 Supercars:
  - ITM Hamilton 400 in Hamilton Street Circuit, Hamilton, New Zealand:
    - Race 8: (1) Jamie Whincup (AUS) (Holden Commodore) (2) Garth Tander (AUS) (Holden Commodore) (3) Michael Caruso (AUS) (Holden Commodore)
      - Drivers' championship standings (after 8 of 26 races): (1) Whincup 1071 points (2) James Courtney (AUS) (Ford Falcon) 867 (3) Mark Winterbottom (AUS) (Ford Falcon) 810
- World Rally Championship:
  - Rally of Turkey in Istanbul: (gold) Sébastien Loeb (FRA)/Daniel Elena (MON) (Citroën C4 WRC) 3:01:38.7 (silver) Petter Solberg (NOR)/Phil Mills (GBR) (Citroën C4 WRC) +54.5 (bronze) Mikko Hirvonen (FIN)/Jarmo Lehtinen (FIN) (Ford Focus WRC)
    - Drivers' standings (after 4 of 13 races): (1) Loeb 93 points (2) Solberg 53 (3) Hirvonen 52
    - Manufacturers' standings: (1) Citroën Total World Rally Team 126 points (2) BP Ford World Rally Team 111 (3) Citroën Junior Team 75

==== Badminton ====
- European Championships in Manchester, England:
  - Mixed Doubles: **Thomas Laybourn** (DEN)/**Kamilla Rytter Juhl** (DEN) [1] def. Robert Mateusiak (POL)/Nadieżda Kostiuczyk (POL) [2] 21–19, 18–21, 21–12
  - Women's Singles: **Tine Rasmussen** (DEN) [2] def. Juliane Schenk (GER) [3] 21–19, 14–21, 21–18
  - Men's Singles: **Peter Gade** (DEN) [1] def. Jan Ø. Jørgensen (DEN) [2] 21–14, 21–11
  - Women's Doubles: **Valeria Sorokina** (RUS)/**Nina Vislova** (RUS) [2] def. Petya Nedelcheva (BUL)/Anastasia Russkikh (RUS) [1] 21–18, 21–14
  - Men's Doubles: **Lars Paaske** (DEN)/**Jonas Rasmussen** (DEN) [2] def. Mathias Boe (DEN)/Carsten Mogensen (DEN) [1] 24–22, 22–20

==== Basketball ====
- NBA Playoffs (all series best-of-7):
  - Western Conference First Round:
    - Game 1: (1) Los Angeles Lakers 87, (8) Oklahoma City Thunder 79. Lakers lead series 1–0.
    - Game 1: (2) Dallas Mavericks 100, (7) San Antonio Spurs 94. Mavericks lead series 1–0.
    - Game 1: (6) Portland Trail Blazers 105, (3) Phoenix Suns 100. Blazers lead series 1–0.
  - Eastern Conference First Round:
    - Game 1: (2) Orlando Magic 98, (7) Charlotte Bobcats 89. Magic lead series 1–0.
- ULEB Eurocup Finals in Vitoria-Gasteiz, Spain:
  - Third-place game: (bronze) Bizkaia Bilbao Basket (Spain) 76–67 (Greece) Panellinios BC
  - Final: (silver) ALBA Berlin (Germany) 44–67 (gold) (Spain) Power Elec Valencia
    - Valencia win the Eurocup for the second time.
    - Matthew Nielsen is named the Finals MVP.

==== Cricket ====
- Ireland in West Indies:
  - 3rd T20 in Kingston, Jamaica:
    - West Indies 152/4 (15/15 ov); Ireland 136/7 (15/15 ov). **West Indies XI win by 16 runs, win the 3-match series 3–0**.

==== Curling ====
- Players' Championships in Dawson Creek, British Columbia:
  - Men's event:
    - Final: (Alberta) Kevin Martin def. (Newfoundland and Labrador) Brad Gushue 8–7
  - Women's event:
    - Final: (Alberta) Cheryl Bernard def. (Alberta) Crystal Webster 6–4

==== Cycling ====
- UCI ProTour:
  - Amstel Gold Race: (gold) Philippe Gilbert (BEL) (Lotto–Intermarché) 6:22:54 (silver) Ryder Hesjedal (CAN) (EF Education–EasyPost) +0:02 (bronze) Enrico Gasparotto (ITA) (XDS Astana Team) +0:02
- Tour of Turkey:
  - Final general classification: (gold) Giovanni Visconti (ITA) (Vini Zabù) 32:42:28 (silver) Tejay van Garderen (USA) (HTC–Highroad) +0:29 (bronze) David Moncoutié (FRA) (Cofidis) +0:33

==== Equestrianism ====
- Show jumping:
  - FEI World Cup Jumping Final in Grand-Saconnex, Switzerland: (gold) Marcus Ehning (GER) on Noltes Küchengirl and Plot Blue (silver) Ludger Beerbaum (GER) on Gotha (silver) Pius Schwizer (SUI) on Ulysse and Carlina

==== Football (soccer) ====
- UEFA Women's Champions League semi-finals, second leg: (first leg score in parentheses)
  - Umeå (Sweden) – (2–3) (France) Lyon postponed to April 28
  - **Turbine Potsdam** (Germany) 1–0 (0–1) (Germany) Duisburg. 1–1 on aggregate, Potsdam win 3–1 on penalties.

==== Golf ====
- PGA Tour:
  - Verizon Heritage in Hilton Head Island, South Carolina:
    - Winner: Jim Furyk (USA) 271 (−13)^{PO}
      - Furyk wins his second PGA Tour title of the season and 15th of his career after a bizarre ending to his sudden-death playoff with Brian Davis (ENG), who calls a two-shot penalty on himself on the first playoff hole.
- Champions Tour:
  - Outback Steakhouse Pro-Am in Lutz, Florida:
    - Winner: Bernhard Langer (DEU) 133 (−9)
      - Langer wins his 10th Champions Tour title after the third and final round is called off due to rain.

==== Gymnastics ====
- European Rhythmic Gymnastics Championships in Bremen, Germany:
  - Group hoops: (gold) Russia 28.200 (silver) Belarus 27.650 (bronze) Italy 27.625
  - Group ribbons and ropes: (gold) Russia 27.600 (silver) Italy 27.300 (bronze) Belarus 27.175

==== Ice hockey ====
- Stanley Cup playoffs (all series best-of-7):
  - Eastern Conference Quarter-finals:
    - Game 3: (7) Philadelphia Flyers 3, (2) New Jersey Devils 2 (OT). Flyers lead series 2–1.
    - Game 3: (4) Pittsburgh Penguins 4, (5) Ottawa Senators, 2. Penguins lead series 2–1.
  - Western Conference Quarter-finals:
    - Game 3: (4) Phoenix Coyotes 4, (5) Detroit Red Wings 2. Coyotes lead series 2–1.
    - Game 2: (2) Chicago Blackhawks 2, (7) Nashville Predators 0. Series tied 1–1.
    - Game 3: (8) Colorado Avalanche 1, (1) San Jose Sharks 0 (OT). Avalanche lead series 2–1.

==== Snooker ====
- World Championship in Sheffield, England:
  - First round (best of 19 frames):
    - Mark Allen (NIR) def. Tom Ford (ENG) 10–4
    - Mark Selby (ENG) def. Ken Doherty (IRL) 10–4
    - Joe Perry (ENG) def. Michael Holt (ENG) 10–4
    - Stephen Hendry (SCO) def Zhang Anda (CHN) 10–9
    - Marco Fu (HKG) leads Martin Gould (ENG) 5–4
    - Ali Carter (ENG) leads Jamie Cope (ENG) 7–2

==== Tennis ====
- ATP World Tour:
  - Monte-Carlo Rolex Masters in Roquebrune-Cap-Martin, France:
    - Final: **Rafael Nadal** (ESP) def. Fernando Verdasco (ESP) 6–0, 6–1
      - Nadal becomes the first player in the Open era to win a tournament six successive times. He also wins his 16th Masters 1000 tournament, and the 37th title of his career.
- WTA Tour:
  - Family Circle Cup in Charleston, South Carolina, United States:
    - Final: **Samantha Stosur** (AUS) def. Vera Zvonareva (RUS) 6–0, 6–3
      - Stosur wins the second title of her career.

==== Wrestling ====
- European Championships in Baku, Azerbaijan:
  - Men's Greco-Roman:
    - 84 kg: (gold) Nazmi Avluca (TUR) (silver) Alexei Mishin (RUS) (bronze) Mélonin Noumonvi (FRA) & Jan Fischer (GER)
    - 96 kg: (gold) Aslanbek Khushtov (RUS) (silver) Tsimafei Dzeinichenka (BLR) (bronze) Soso Jabidze (GEO) & Cenk İldem (TUR)
    - 120 kg: (gold) Rıza Kayaalp (TUR) (silver) Radomir Petković (SRB) (bronze) Johan Eurén (SWE) & Mindaugas Mizgaitis (LTU)

=== April 17, 2010 (Saturday) ===
==== Auto racing ====
- Nationwide Series:
  - O'Reilly 300 in Fort Worth, Texas: Race is postponed from Saturday to Sunday due to rain.
- V8 Supercars:
  - ITM Hamilton 400 in Hamilton, New Zealand:
    - Race 7: (1) Jamie Whincup (AUS) (Holden Commodore) (2) Garth Tander (AUS) (Holden Commodore) (3) James Courtney (AUS) (Ford Falcon)
      - Drivers' standings (after 7 of 26 races): (1) Whincup 921 points (2) Courtney 825 (3) Mark Winterbottom (AUS) (Ford Falcon) 810

==== Baseball ====
- Ubaldo Jiménez of the Colorado Rockies throws the first no-hitter of the 2010 season, and the first in the team's history, in the Rockies' 4–0 win over the Atlanta Braves in Atlanta.
- The Mets defeated the Cardinals in a 20-inning game that ran nearly 7 hours.

==== Basketball ====
- NBA Playoffs (all series best-of-7):
  - Western Conference First Round:
    - Game 1: (4) Denver Nuggets 126, (5) Utah Jazz 113. Nuggets lead series 1–0.
  - Eastern Conference First Round:
    - Game 1: (1) Cleveland Cavaliers 96, (8) Chicago Bulls 83. Cavaliers lead series 1–0.
    - Game 1: (3) Atlanta Hawks 102, (6) Milwaukee Bucks 92. Hawks lead series 1–0.
    - Game 1: (4) Boston Celtics 85, (5) Miami Heat 76. Celtics lead series 1–0.
- ULEB Eurocup Finals in Vitoria-Gasteiz, Spain:
  - Semifinals:
    - Power Elec Valencia (Spain) 92–80 (Greece) Panellinios BC
    - ALBA Berlin (Germany) 77–70 (Spain) Bizkaia Bilbao Basket

==== Cricket ====
- Ireland in West Indies:
  - 2nd T20 in Kingston, Jamaica:
    - West Indies XI 171/7 (20.0 overs); Ireland 153/7 (20.0 overs). **West Indies XI win by 18 runs, lead the 3-match series 2–0**.

==== Cycling ====
- Asian Championships in Sharjah, United Arab Emirates:
  - Men's Sprint: (gold) Zhang Miao (CHN) (silver) Kang Dong-Jin (KOR) (bronze) Yudai Nitta (JPN)
  - Men's Omnium: (gold) Cho Ho-Sung (KOR) (silver) Kazuhiro Mori (JPN) (bronze) Wu Po-Hung (TPE)
  - Men's Madison: (gold) South Korea (silver) Hong Kong (bronze) Japan
  - Women's Omnium: (gold) Na Ah-Reum (KOR) (silver) Diao Xiao Juan (HKG) (bronze) Hsiao Mei-Yu (TPE)

==== Equestrianism ====
- Four-in-hand–driving:
  - FEI World Cup Driving Final in Grand-Saconnex, Switzerland: (gold) Boyd Exell (AUS), horses: Bill, Carrington Park Ajax, Lucky, Spitfire (silver) Koos de Ronde (NED), horses: Charley, Mario, Mister, Tommy (bronze) IJsbrand Chardon (NED), horses: Illem, Inci, Maestoso X-28 Fegyenc, Maestoso X-28 Magus

==== Football (soccer) ====
- OFC Champions League Final, first leg:
  - PRK Hekari United (Papua New Guinea) 3–0 (New Zealand) Waitakere United

==== Gymnastics ====
- European Rhythmic Gymnastics Championships in Bremen, Germany:
  - Group all-around: (gold) Russia 54.500 (silver) Italy 53.925 (bronze) Belarus 53.600

==== Ice hockey ====
- Stanley Cup playoffs (all series best-of-7):
  - Eastern Conference Quarter-finals:
    - Game 2: (6) Boston Bruins 5, (3) Buffalo Sabres 3. Series tied 1–1.
    - Game 2: (1) Washington Capitals 6, (8) Montreal Canadiens 5 (OT). Series tied 1–1.
  - Western Conference Quarter-finals:
    - Game 2: (6) Los Angeles Kings 3, (3) Vancouver Canucks 2 (OT). Series tied 1–1.

==== Snooker ====
- World Championship in Sheffield, England:
  - First round (best of 19 frames):
    - John Higgins (SCO) def. Barry Hawkins (ENG) 10–6
    - Mark Allen (NIR) leads Tom Ford (ENG) 8–1
    - Joe Perry (ENG) leads Michael Holt (ENG) 7–2
    - Stephen Hendry (SCO) leads Zhang Anda (CHN) 5–4
    - Mark Selby (ENG) leads Ken Doherty (IRL) 6–3

==== Tennis ====
- WTA Tour:
  - Barcelona Ladies Open in Barcelona, Spain:
    - Final: **Francesca Schiavone** (ITA) def. Roberta Vinci (ITA) 6–1, 6–1
      - Schiavone wins the third title of her career.

==== Wrestling ====
- European Championships in Baku, Azerbaijan:
  - Men's Greco-Roman:
    - 55 kg: (gold) Elchin Aliyev (AZE) (silver) Nazyr Mankiev (RUS) (bronze) Vugar Ragimov (UKR) & Péter Módos (HUN)
    - 60 kg: (gold) Hasan Aliyev (AZE) (silver) Kostyantyn Balitskyy (UKR) (bronze) Zaur Kuramagomedov (RUS) & Tonimir Sokol (CRO)
    - 66 kg: (gold) Ambako Vachadze (RUS) (silver) Ion Panait (ROU) (bronze) Steeve Guenot (FRA) & Tamás Lőrincz (HUN)
    - 74 kg: (gold) Aliaksandr Kikiniou (BLR) (silver) Elvin Mursaliyev (AZE) (bronze) Dmytro Pyshkov (UKR) & Péter Bácsi (HUN)

=== April 16, 2010 (Friday) ===
==== Cycling ====
- Asian Championships in Sharjah, United Arab Emirates:
  - Women's Scratch: (gold) I Fang-Ju (TPE) (silver) Lee Min-Hye (KOR) (bronze) Diao Xiao Juan (HKG)
  - Women's Team Sprint: (gold) China (silver) Chinese Taipei (bronze) Hong Kong
  - Other events postponed to Saturday due to heavy wind.

==== Gymnastics ====
- European Rhythmic Gymnastics Championships in Bremen, Germany:
  - Individual all-around: (gold) Evgenia Kanaeva (RUS) 115.900 (silver) Daria Kondakova (RUS) 113.725 (bronze) Aliya Garayeva (AZE) 111.375

==== Ice hockey ====
- Stanley Cup playoffs (all series best-of-7):
  - Eastern Conference Quarter-finals:
    - Game 2: (4) Pittsburgh Penguins 2, (5) Ottawa Senators 1. Series tied 1–1.
    - Game 2: at (2) New Jersey Devils 5, (7) Philadelphia Flyers 3. Series tied 1–1.
  - Western Conference Quarter-finals:
    - Game 1: (7) Nashville Predators 4, (2) Chicago Blackhawks 1. Predators lead series 1–0.
    - Game 2: (5) Detroit Red Wings 7, (4) Phoenix Coyotes 4. Series tied 1–1.
    - Game 2: (1) San Jose Sharks 6, (8) Colorado Avalanche 5 (OT). Series tied 1–1.

==== Wrestling ====
- European Championships in Baku, Azerbaijan:
  - Women's freestyle:
    - 48 kg: (gold) Lorissa Ojortsak (RUS) (silver) Yana Stadnik (GBR) (bronze) Melanie Lesaffre (FRA) & Iwona Matkowska (POL)
    - 55 kg: (gold) Anastasija Grigorjeva (LAT) (silver) Natalja Golts (RUS) (bronze) Agata Pietrzyk (POL) & Ana Paval (ROU)
    - 63 kg: (gold) Ljubow Wolossowa (RUS) (silver) Audrey Prieto-Bokhashvili (FRA) (bronze) Julia Ostaptschuk (UKR) & Elina Wasewa (BUL)
    - 72 kg: (gold) Stanka Slatewa (BUL) (silver) Ekatarina Bukina (RUS) (bronze) Emma Weberg (SWE) & Maider Unda Gonzales de Audicana (ESP)

=== April 15, 2010 (Thursday) ===
==== Cricket ====
- Ireland in West Indies:
  - Only ODI in Kingston, Jamaica:
    - Ireland 219 (50 overs); West Indies 213/4 (44/45 overs; Ramnaresh Sarwan 100*). **West Indies win by 6 wickets (D/L).**

==== Cycling ====
- Asian Championships in Sharjah, United Arab Emirates:
  - Men's 1 km Time Trial: (gold) Zhang Miao (CHN) (silver) Mohd Hafiz Sufian (MAS) (bronze) Yudai Nitta (JPN)
  - Men's Keirin: (gold) Kazunari Watanabe (JPN) (silver) Kazuya Narita (JPN) (bronze) Mohd Hafiz Sufian (MAS)
  - Men's Scratch: (gold) Choi Hyung-Min (KOR) (silver) Evgeniy Sladkov (KAZ) (bronze) Thurakit Boonratanathanakorn (THA)
  - Men's Team Pursuit: (gold) South Korea (silver) China (bronze) Hong Kong
  - Women's Sprint: (gold) Guo Shuang (CHN) (silver) Gong Jinjie (CHN) (bronze) Lee Wai Sze (HKG)
  - Women's Team Pursuit: (gold) China (silver) South Korea (bronze) Chinese Taipei

==== Darts ====
- Premier League week 10 in Sheffield, England: (players in **bold** advance to the play-offs)
  - Terry Jenkins (ENG) 8–5 Adrian Lewis (ENG)
  - Ronnie Baxter (ENG) 7–7 Mervyn King (ENG)
  - James Wade (ENG) 7–7 **Phil Taylor** (ENG)
  - Raymond van Barneveld (NED) 6–8 Simon Whitlock (AUS)
    - High Checkout: Whitlock 154
      - Standings (after 10 matches): Taylor 18 points, King, Baxter, Whitlock 11, Lewis, Wade 9, Jenkins 6, van Barneveld 5

==== Football (soccer) ====
- Copa Libertadores Second Stage: (teams in **bold** advance to the knockout stage, teams in ~~strike~~ are eliminated)
  - Group 4:
    - ~~Blooming~~ (Bolivia) 1–2 (Paraguay) **Libertad**
    - ~~Lanús~~ (Argentina) 0–0 (Peru) Universitario
      - Final standings: Libertad 12 points, Universitario 10, Lanús 8, Blooming 1.
  - Group 7:
    - ~~Colo-Colo~~ (Chile) 1–1 (Brazil) **Cruzeiro**
    - **Vélez Sársfield** (Argentina) 4–0 (Venezuela) ~~Deportivo Italia~~
      - Final standings: Vélez Sársfield 13 points, Cruzeiro 11, Colo-Colo 8, Deportivo Italia 1.

==== Ice hockey ====
- Stanley Cup playoffs (all series best-of-7):
  - Eastern Conference Quarter-finals:
    - Game 1: (8) Montreal Canadiens 3, (1) Washington Capitals 2 (OT). Canadiens lead series 1–0.
    - Game 1: (3) Buffalo Sabres 2, (6) Boston Bruins 1. Sabres lead series 1–0.
  - Western Conference Quarter-finals:
    - Game 1: (3) Vancouver Canucks 3, (6) Los Angeles Kings 2 (OT). Canucks lead series 1–0.

==== Wrestling ====
- European Championships in Baku, Azerbaijan:
  - Women's freestyle:
    - 51 kg: (gold) Sofia Mattsson (SWE) (silver) Estera Dobre (ROU) (bronze) Tina Ylinen (FIN) & Natalia Budu (MDA)
    - 59 kg: (gold) Sona Ahmadli (AZE) (silver) Taybe Yusein (BUL) (bronze) Meryem Seloum Fattah (FRA) & Marianna Sastin (HUN)
    - 67 kg: (gold) Nadya Sementsova (AZE) (silver) Kateryna Burmistrova (UKR) (bronze) Alena Kardashova (RUS) & Iryna Tsyrkevich (BLR)

=== April 14, 2010 (Wednesday) ===
==== Cycling ====
- Asian Championships in Sharjah, United Arab Emirates:
  - Men's Individual Pursuit: (gold) Jang Sun-jae (KOR) (silver) Feng Chun-kai (TPE) (bronze) Hossein Askari (IRI)
  - Men's Points Race: (gold) Cho Ho-Sung (KOR) (silver) Amir Zargari (IRI) (bronze) Kwok Ho Ting (HKG)
  - Men's Team Sprint: (gold) China (silver) Japan (bronze) Iran
  - Women's 500 m Time Trial: (gold) Guo Shuang (CHN) (silver) Lee Wai Sze (HKG) (bronze) Kim Won-Gyeong (KOR)
  - Women's Individual Pursuit: (gold) Jiang Fan (CHN) (silver) Na Ah-Reum (KOR) (bronze) Chanpeng Nontasin (THA)
  - Women's Points Race: (gold) Mayuko Hagiwara (JPN) (silver) Jamie Wong (HKG) (bronze) Tang Kerong (CHN)

==== Football (soccer) ====
- Copa Libertadores Second Stage: (teams in **bold** advance to the knockout stage, teams in ~~strike~~ are eliminated)
  - Group 1: Racing (Uruguay) 0–2 (Brazil) **Corinthians**
    - Standings (after 5 matches): Corinthians 13 points, Racing 7, Independiente Medellín 6, ~~Cerro Porteño~~ 1.
  - Group 5: ~~Emelec~~ (Ecuador) 0–0 (Brazil) Internacional
    - Standings (after 5 matches): Deportivo Quito 10 points, Internacional 9, Cerro 7, Emelec 1.
  - Group 8: Universidad Católica 2–0 (Brazil) Flamengo
    - Standings (after 5 matches): **Universidad de Chile** 11 points, Flamengo 7, Universidad Católica 6, ~~Caracas~~ 2.
- AFC Champions League group stage, Round 5: (teams in **bold** advance to the knockout stage, teams in ~~strike~~ are eliminated)
  - Group A:
    - **Esteghlal** (Iran) 2–1 (Saudi Arabia) ~~Al-Ahli~~
    - **Al-Gharafa** (Qatar) 4–2 (United Arab Emirates) ~~Al-Jazira~~
      - Standings (after 5 matches): Esteghlal 11 points, Al-Gharafa 10, Al-Ahli 6, Al-Jazira 1.
  - Group B:
    - ~~Al-Wahda~~ (United Arab Emirates) 1–0 (Iran) **Zob Ahan**
    - Al-Ittihad (Saudi Arabia) 1–1 (Uzbekistan) Bunyodkor
      - Standings (after 5 matches): Zob Ahan 10 points, Al-Ittihad 8, Bunyodkor 7, Al-Wahda 3.
  - Group E:
    - Kawasaki Frontale (Japan) 3–0 (South Korea) **Seongnam Ilhwa Chunma**
    - ~~Melbourne Victory~~ (Australia) 0–0 (China) Beijing Guoan
      - Standings (after 5 matches): Seongnam Ilhwa Chunma 12 points, Beijing Guoan 7, Kawasaki Frontale 6, Melbourne Victory 4.
  - Group F:
    - ~~Changchun Yatai~~ (China) 0–1 (Japan) **Kashima Antlers**
    - **Jeonbuk Hyundai Motors** (South Korea) 8–0 (Indonesia) ~~Persipura Jayapura~~
      - Standings (after 5 matches): Kashima Antlers 15 points, Jeonbuk Hyundai Motors 12, Changchun Yatai 3, Persipura Jayapura 0.

==== Ice hockey ====
- Stanley Cup playoffs (all series best-of-7):
  - Eastern Conference Quarter-finals:
    - Game 1: (5) Ottawa Senators 5, (4) Pittsburgh Penguins 4. Senators lead series 1–0.
    - Game 1: (7) Philadelphia Flyers 2, (2) New Jersey Devils 1. Flyers lead series 1–0.
  - Western Conference Quarter-finals:
    - Game 1: (4) Phoenix Coyotes 3, (5) Detroit Red Wings 2. Coyotes lead series 1–0.
    - Game 1: (8) Colorado Avalanche 2, (1) San Jose Sharks 1. Avalanche lead series 1–0.

==== Wrestling ====
- European Championships in Baku, Azerbaijan:
  - Men's freestyle:
    - 60 kg: (gold) Opan Sat (RUS) (silver) Malkhaz Zarkua (GEO) (bronze) Andrei Perpelita (MDA) & Vasyl Fedoryshyn (UKR)
    - 74 kg: (gold) Denis Tsargush (RUS) (silver) Kiril Terziev (BUL) (bronze) Chamsulvara Chamsulvarayev (AZE) & Batuhan Demirçin (TUR)
    - 96 kg: (gold) Khetag Gazyumov (AZE) (silver) Georgi Gogshelidze (GEO) (bronze) Serhat Balcı (TUR) & Aliaksei Dubko (BLR)

=== April 13, 2010 (Tuesday) ===
==== Baseball ====
- MLB season opening games:
  - American League:
    - New York Yankees 7, Los Angeles Angels of Anaheim 5
      - The Yankees receive their 2009 World Series championship rings before the game, which sees Hideki Matsui's return to Yankee Stadium.
  - National League:
    - Los Angeles Dodgers 9, Arizona Diamondbacks 5

==== Cricket ====
- Canada in West Indies:
  - Only ODI in Kingston, Jamaica:
    - West Indies 316/4 (50.0 overs, S Chanderpaul 101); Canada 108 (39.2 overs). **West Indies win by 208 runs.**

==== Football (soccer) ====
- Copa Libertadores Second Stage: (teams in **bold** advance to the knockout stage, teams in ~~strike~~ are eliminated)
  - Group 5: Deportivo Quito (Ecuador) 2–1 (Uruguay) Cerro
    - Standings: Deportivo Quito 10 points (5 matches), Internacional 8 (4), Cerro 7 (5), ~~Emelec~~ 0 (4).
  - Group 8: ~~Caracas~~ (Venezuela) 1–3 Universidad de Chile
    - Standings: Universidad de Chile 11 points (5 matches), Flamengo 7 (4), Universidad Católica 3 (4), Caracas 2 (5).
- AFC Champions League group stage, Round 5: (teams in **bold** advance to the knockout stage, teams in ~~strike~~ are eliminated)
  - Group C:
    - Pakhtakor (Uzbekistan) 3–2 (United Arab Emirates) ~~Al-Ain~~
    - Sepahan (Iran) 1–0 (Saudi Arabia) Al-Shabab
      - Standings (after 5 matches): Pakhtakor 9 points, Sepahan 8, Al-Shabab 7, Al-Ain 4.
  - Group D:
    - Al-Ahli (United Arab Emirates) 2–1 (Iran) Mes Kerman
    - **Al-Hilal** (Saudi Arabia) 0–0 (Qatar) Al-Sadd
      - Standings (after 5 matches): Al-Hilal 11 points, Al-Sadd 7, Mes Kerman 6, Al-Ahli 4.
  - Group G:
    - **Gamba Osaka** (Japan) 2–1 (South Korea) **Suwon Samsung Bluewings**
    - ~~Singapore Armed Forces~~ 2–1 (China) ~~Henan Construction~~
      - Standings (after 5 matches): Gamba Osaka 11 points, Suwon Samsung Bluewings 10, Singapore Armed Forces 4, Henan Construction 2
  - Group H:
    - ~~Shandong Luneng~~ (China) 2–3 (Japan) ~~Sanfrecce Hiroshima~~
    - **Pohang Steelers** (South Korea) 0–0 (Australia) **Adelaide United**
      - Standings (after 5 matches): Adelaide United, Pohang Steelers 10 points, Sanfrecce Hiroshima 6, Shandong Luneng 3.

==== Wrestling ====
- European Championships in Baku, Azerbaijan:
  - Men's freestyle:
    - 55 kg: (gold) Makhmud Magomedov (AZE) (silver) Radoslav Velikov (BUL) (bronze) Marcel Ewald (GER) & Viktor Lebedev (RUS)
    - 66 kg: (gold) Jabrayil Hasanov (AZE) (silver) Magomedmurad Gadzhiev (RUS) (bronze) Otar Tushishvili (GEO) & Adam Sobieraj (POL)
    - 84 kg: (gold) Anzor Urishev (RUS) (silver) Sharif Sharifov (AZE) (bronze) Stefan Gheorghita (ROU) & Mikhail Ganev (BUL)
    - 120 kg: (gold) Beylal Makhov (RUS) (silver) Fatih Çakıroğlu (TUR) (bronze) Alexei Shemarov (BLR) & Dimitar Kumchev (BUL)

=== April 12, 2010 (Monday) ===
==== Baseball ====
- MLB season Opening Day games:
  - American League:
    - Texas Rangers 4, Cleveland Indians 2 (10 innings)
    - Minnesota Twins 5, Boston Red Sox 2
      - This is the first regular-season game at Target Field.
      - Prior to the game, the Minnesota Twins unveil a new statue honoring late Hall of Famer Kirby Puckett outside the stadium.
    - Oakland Athletics 4, Seattle Mariners 0
    - Chicago White Sox 8, Toronto Blue Jays 7 (11 innings)
  - National League:
    - Chicago Cubs 9, Milwaukee Brewers 5
    - Philadelphia Phillies 7, Washington Nationals 4
    - St. Louis Cardinals 5, Houston Astros 0
    - San Diego Padres 17, Atlanta Braves 2

==== Cycling ====
- Asian Championships in Sharjah, United Arab Emirates:
  - Men's Road Race, 162 km: (gold) Mehdi Sohrabi (IRI) 3h 27' 21" (silver) Takashi Miyazawa (JPN) + 1' 26" (bronze) Hossein Nateghi (IRI) 1' 26"

=== April 11, 2010 (Sunday) ===
==== Athletics ====
- Paris Marathon:
  - Men: (gold) Tadesse Tola (ETH) 2:06:40 (silver) Alfred Kering (KEN) 2:07:10 (bronze) Wilson Kipsang (KEN) 2:07:10
  - Women: (gold) Atsede Baysa (ETH) 2:22:02 (course record) (silver) Christelle Daunay (FRA) 2:24:22 (bronze) Beyene Tsegaye Tirfi (ETH) 2:24:49

==== Auto racing ====
- IndyCar Series:
  - Indy Grand Prix of Alabama in Birmingham, Alabama:
    - (1) Hélio Castroneves (BRA) (Team Penske) (2) Scott Dixon (NZL) (Chip Ganassi Racing) (3) Dario Franchitti (GBR) (Chip Ganassi Racing)
      - Driver standings (after 3 of 17 races): (1) Will Power (AUS) (Team Penske) 136 points (2) Castroneves 104 (3) Franchitti 94.

==== Basketball ====
- EuroLeague Women Final Four in Valencia, Spain:
  - Third place game: Wisła Can-Pack Kraków (Poland) 50–84 (bronze) (Russia) UMMC Ekaterinburg
  - Final: (silver) Ros Casares Valencia (Spain) 80–87 (gold) (Russia) Spartak Moscow Region
    - Spartak Moscow Region win the title for the fourth straight time.
    - Diana Taurasi was named the Final Four MVP.
- (Germany) German Cup Final:
  - **Brose Baskets** 76–75 Deutsche Bank Skyliners

==== Cricket ====
- Ireland in West Indies:
  - 1st T20 in Trelawny, Jamaica:
    - West Indies XI 143/8 (20.0 overs), Ireland 112/7 (20.0 overs). **West Indies XI win by 31 runs, lead 3–match series 1–0.**

==== Curling ====
- World Men's Championship in Cortina d'Ampezzo, Italy:
  - Bronze medal game: (bronze) Scotland 6–4 United States
  - Final: (gold) Canada 9–3 (silver) Norway

==== Cycling ====
- Monument Classics:
  - Paris–Roubaix: (gold) Fabian Cancellara (SUI) (Team Saxo Bank) 6h 35' 10" (silver) Thor Hushovd (NOR) (Cervélo TestTeam) + 2' 00" (bronze) Juan Antonio Flecha (ESP) (Team Sky) + 2' 00"
- Asian Championships in Sharjah, United Arab Emirates:
  - Women's Road Race, 97.2 km: (gold) You Jin-A (KOR) 2h 48' 57" (silver) Natalya Stefanskaya (KAZ) s.t. (bronze) Jutatip Maneephan (THA) s.t.

==== Football (soccer) ====
- 2011 FIFA Women's World Cup qualification (UEFA):
  - Group 5: ~~Turkey~~ 5–1 ~~Malta~~
    - Standings: Spain 15 points (6 matches), England 12 (4), Turkey 6 (5), ~~Austria~~ 3 (4), Malta 0 (5)
- UEFA Women's Champions League semi-finals, first leg:
  - Duisburg (Germany) 1–0 (Germany) Turbine Potsdam

==== Golf ====
- Men's majors:
  - The Masters in Augusta, Georgia, United States (all USA unless otherwise indicated):
    - (1) Phil Mickelson 272 (−16) (2) Lee Westwood (ENG) 275 (−13) (3) Anthony Kim 276 (−12)
      - Mickelson wins his third Masters and fourth major title. In his first tournament after his self-imposed absence, Tiger Woods finishes tied for fourth with K.J. Choi (KOR).
- European Tour:
  - Madeira Island Open in Porto Santo, Madeira, Portugal:
    - Winner: James Morrison (ENG) 268 (−20)
      - Morrison wins his first European Tour title.

==== Motorcycle racing ====
- Moto GP:
  - Qatar motorcycle Grand Prix in Doha, Qatar:
    - MotoGP: (1) Valentino Rossi (ITA) (Yamaha) 42:50.099 (2) Jorge Lorenzo (ESP) (Yamaha) +1.022 (3) Andrea Dovizioso (ITA) (Honda) +1.865
    - Moto2: (1) Shoya Tomizawa (JPN) (Suter) 41:11.768 (2) Alex Debón (ESP) (FTR) + 4.656 (3) Jules Cluzel (FRA) (Suter) + 4.789
    - 125 cc: (1) Nicolás Terol (ESP) (Aprilia) 38:25.644 (2) Efrén Vázquez (ESP) (Derbi) + 2.395 (3) Marc Márquez (ESP) (Derbi) + 2.420
- Superbike:
  - Valencia Superbike World Championship round in Valencia, Spain:
    - Race 1: (1) Leon Haslam (GBR) (Suzuki GSX-R1000) (2) Max Biaggi (ITA) (Aprilia RSV 4) (3) James Toseland (GBR) (Yamaha YZF-R1)
    - Race 2: (1) Noriyuki Haga (JPN) (Ducati 1098R) (2) Carlos Checa (ESP) (Ducati 1098R) (3) Biaggi
      - Riders' standings (after 3 of 13 rounds): (1) Haslam 123 points (2) Biaggi 105 (3) Checa 80
      - Manufacturers' standings: (1) Suzuki 123 (2) Ducati 107 (3) Aprilia 105
- Supersport:
  - Valencia Supersport World Championship round in Valencia, Spain:
    - (1) Joan Lascorz (ESP) (Kawasaki ZX-6R) (2) Kenan Sofuoğlu (TUR) (Honda CBR600RR) (3) Chaz Davies (GBR) (Triumph Daytona 675)
      - Riders' standings (after 3 of 13 rounds): (1) Lascorz 65 points (2) Sofuoğlu 61 (3) Eugene Laverty (IRL) (Honda CBR600RR) 41
      - Manufacturers' standings: (1) Honda 70 (2) Kawasaki 65 (3) Triumph 42

==== Rugby union ====
- Heineken Cup quarter-finals:
  - Toulouse (France) 42–16 (France) Stade Français
- Amlin Challenge Cup quarter-finals:
  - London Wasps (England) 42–26 (England) Gloucester
  - Newcastle Falcons (England) 20–55 (Wales) Cardiff Blues

==== Tennis ====
- ATP World Tour:
  - Grand Prix Hassan II in Casablanca, Morocco:
    - Final: **Stanislas Wawrinka** (SUI) def. Victor Hănescu (ROM) 6–2, 6–3
      - Wawrinka wins the second title of his career after five successive losses in finals.
  - U.S. Men's Clay Court Championships in Houston, United States:
    - Final: **Juan Ignacio Chela** (ARG) def. Sam Querrey (USA) 5–7, 6–4, 6–3
      - Chela wins the fifth title of his career after a break of three years.
- WTA Tour:
  - MPS Group Championships in Ponte Vedra Beach, United States:
    - Final: **Caroline Wozniacki** (DEN) def. Olga Govortsova (BLR) 6–2, 7–5
      - Wozniacki wins the tournament for the second straight year and the seventh title of her career.
  - Andalucia Tennis Experience in Marbella, Spain:
    - Final: **Flavia Pennetta** (ITA) def. Carla Suárez Navarro (ESP) 6–2, 4–6, 6–3
      - Pennetta wins the ninth title of her career.

==== Triathlon ====
- ITU World Championships:
  - Event 1 in Sydney:
    - Men's: (gold) Bevan Docherty (NZL) (silver) Alexander Brukhankov (RUS) (bronze) David Hauss (FRA)
    - Women's: (gold) Barbara Riveros Diaz (CHI) (silver) Andrea Hewitt (NZL) (bronze) Emma Moffatt (AUS)

==== Weightlifting ====
- European Championships in Minsk, Belarus:
  - Men's 105kg:
    - Snatch: (gold) Andrei Aramnau (BLR) 195 kg (silver) Vladimir Smorchkov (RUS) 193 kg (bronze) Dmitry Klokov (RUS) 185 kg
    - Clean & Jerk: (gold) Aramnau 225 kg (silver) Klokov 224 kg (bronze) Oleksiy Torokhty (UKR) 221 kg
    - Total: (gold) Aramnau 420 kg (silver) Klokov 409 kg (bronze) Smorchkov 408 kg
  - Men's +105kg:
    - Snatch: (gold) Evgeny Chigishev (RUS) 205 kg (silver) Ruben Aleksanyan (ARM) 195 kg (bronze) Almir Velagic (GER) 190 kg
    - Clean & Jerk: (gold) Aleksanyan 237 kg (silver) Matthias Steiner (GER) 236 kg (bronze) Chigishev 235 kg
    - Total: (gold) Chigishev 440 kg (silver) Aleksanyan 432 kg (bronze) Steiner 426 kg

=== April 10, 2010 (Saturday) ===
==== Auto racing ====
- NASCAR Sprint Cup Series:
  - Subway Fresh Fit 600 in Avondale, Arizona:
    - (1) (Indiana) Ryan Newman (Chevrolet, Stewart Haas Racing) (2) (California) Jeff Gordon (Chevrolet, Hendrick Motorsports) (3) (California) Jimmie Johnson (Chevrolet, Hendrick Motorsports)
      - Standings (after 7 of 36 races): (1) Johnson 1073 points (2) (Wisconsin) Matt Kenseth (Ford, Roush Fenway Racing) 1037 (3) (Washington (state)) Greg Biffle (Ford, Roush Fenway Racing) 981

==== Curling ====
- World Men's Championship in Cortina d'Ampezzo, Italy:
  - Playoff 3 vs. 4: Scotland 6–4 United States
  - Semifinal: Norway 9–7 Scotland

==== Cycling ====
- UCI ProTour:
  - Tour of the Basque Country:
    - Stage 6: (gold) Chris Horner (USA) (Team RadioShack) 32' 33" (silver) Alejandro Valverde (ESP) (Caisse d'Epargne) + 8" (bronze) Maxime Monfort (BEL) (Team HTC–Columbia) + 13"
      - Final General classification: (1) Horner 23h 27' 30" (2) Valverde + 7" (3) Beñat Intxausti (ESP) (Euskaltel–Euskadi) + 58"
- Asian Championships in Sharjah, United Arab Emirates:
  - Men's Individual Time Trial, 42.6 km: (gold) Andrey Mizurov (KAZ) 52' 59.66" (silver) Hossein Askari (IRI) + 20.80" (bronze) Eugen Wacker (KGZ) + 1' 31.48"

==== Figure skating ====
- ISU World Synchronized Skating Championships in Colorado Springs, United States:
  - (gold) Rockettes (Finland 1) 223.90 (silver) Marigold IceUnity (Finland 2) 216.98 (bronze) Haydenettes (United States 1) 216.48
    - This is the second title in three years for Rockettes and the fifth title for Finland.

==== Football (soccer) ====
- UEFA Women's Champions League semi-finals, first leg:
  - Lyon (France) 3–2 (Sweden) Umeå

==== Golf ====
- Men's majors:
  - The Masters in Augusta, Georgia, United States:
    - Leaderboard after third round (USA unless stated): (1) Lee Westwood (ENG) 204 (−12) (2) Phil Mickelson 205 (−11) (3) Tiger Woods & K. J. Choi (KOR) 208 (−8)

==== Horse racing ====
- Grand National in Aintree, Merseyside, England: (gold) Don't Push It (trainer: Jonjo O'Neill, jockey: Tony McCoy) (silver) Black Apalachi (trainer: Dessie Hughes, jockey: Denis O'Regan) (bronze) State of Play (trainer: Evan Williams, jockey: Paul Moloney)
  - At his 15th attempt at the race, 14-time champion jockey McCoy wins his first Grand National.

==== Ice hockey ====
- NCAA Division I Men's Tournament Final in Detroit:
  - Boston College 5, Wisconsin 0
    - In front of a crowd of 37,592, the largest ever to watch an indoor ice hockey game, the Eagles win their second national title in three years and fourth overall.

==== Mixed martial arts ====
- UFC 112 in Abu Dhabi:
  - Middleweight Championship bout: Anderson Silva (BRA) (c) def. Demian Maia (BRA) via unanimous decision (50–45, 50–45, 49–46) to retain the UFC Middleweight Championship.
    - Silva breaks the record for the most consecutive title defenses with 6.
  - Lightweight Championship bout: Frankie Edgar (USA) def. B.J. Penn (USA) (c) via unanimous decision (50–45, 48–47, 49–46) to win the UFC Lightweight Championship.
  - Welterweight bout: Matt Hughes (USA) def. Renzo Gracie (BRA) via TKO (strikes) at 4:40 of round 3.
  - Lightweight bout: Rafael dos Anjos (BRA) def. Terry Etim (ENG) via submission (armbar) at 4:30 of round 2.
  - Middleweight bout: Mark Muñoz (USA) def. Kendall Grove (USA) via TKO (strikes) at 2:50 of round 2.

==== Rugby union ====
- Heineken Cup quarter-finals:
  - Biarritz (France) 29–28 (Wales) Ospreys in Donostia-San Sebastián, Spain
  - Munster (Ireland) 33–19 (England) Northampton Saints
- Amlin Challenge Cup quarter-finals:
  - Connacht (Ireland) 23–20 (France) Bourgoin
  - Toulon (France) 38–12 (Wales) Scarlets

==== Volleyball ====
- Men's CEV Champions League Final Four in Łódź, Poland:
  - Postponed due to the air crash in which 96 people were killed, including President of Poland Lech Kaczyński.

==== Weightlifting ====
- European Championships in Minsk, Belarus:
  - Women's 75kg:
    - Snatch: (gold) Natalya Zabolotnaya (RUS) 129 kg (silver) Nadezhda Evstyukhina (RUS) 127 kg (bronze) Hripsime Khurshudyan (ARM) 122 kg
    - Clean & Jerk: (gold) Zabolotnaya 156 kg (silver) Evstyukhina 155 kg (bronze) Khurshudyan 151 kg
    - Total: (gold) Zabolotnaya 285 kg (silver) Evstyukhina 282 kg (bronze) Khurshudyan 273 kg
  - Men's 94kg:
    - Snatch: (gold) Artem Ivanov (UKR) 180 kg (silver) Arsen Kasabiev (POL) 176 kg (bronze) Rovshan Fatullayev (AZE) 175 kg
    - Clean & Jerk: (gold) Kasabiev 216 kg (silver) Fatullayev 215 kg (bronze) Antolii Ciricu (MDA) 208 kg
    - Total: (gold) Kasabiev 392 kg (silver) Fatullayev 390 kg (bronze) Ivanov 383 kg
  - Women's +75kg:
    - Snatch: (gold) Tatiana Kashirina (RUS) 135 kg (silver) Olha Korobka (UKR) 123 kg (bronze) Ümmühan Uçar (TUR) 117 kg
    - Clean & Jerk: (gold) Kashirina 162 kg (silver) Korobka 150 kg (bronze) Volha Kniazhyshcha (BLR) 141 kg
    - Total: (gold) Kashirina 297 kg (silver) Korobka 273 kg (bronze) Kniazhyshcha 257 kg

=== April 9, 2010 (Friday) ===
==== Auto racing ====
- Nationwide Series:
  - Bashas' Supermarkets 200 in Avondale, Arizona:
    - (1) (Nevada) Kyle Busch (Toyota, Joe Gibbs Racing) (2) (California) Kevin Harvick (Chevrolet, Kevin Harvick Incorporated) (3) (Michigan) Brad Keselowski (Dodge, Penske Racing)
      - Standings (after 6 of 35 races): (1) Keselowski 974 points (2) (Missouri) Carl Edwards (Ford, Roush Fenway Racing) 970 (3) Busch 959

==== Baseball ====
- MLB season opening games:
  - American League:
    - Detroit Tigers 5, Cleveland Indians 2
    - Toronto Blue Jays 7, Baltimore Orioles 6
  - National League:
    - Colorado Rockies 7, San Diego Padres 0
    - San Francisco Giants 5, Atlanta Braves 4 (13 innings)
    - Los Angeles Dodgers 7, Florida Marlins 3

==== Basketball ====
- EuroLeague Women Final Four in Valencia, Spain:
  - Semifinals:
    - Wisła Can-Pack Kraków (Poland) 59–86 (Spain) **Ros Casares Valencia**
    - UMMC Ekaterinburg (Russia) 79–87 (Russia) **Spartak Moscow Region**

==== Curling ====
- World Men's Championship in Cortina d'Ampezzo, Italy:
  - Playoff 1 vs. 2: Norway 5–11 Canada

==== Cycling ====
- UCI ProTour:
  - Tour of the Basque Country:
    - Stage 5: (gold) Joaquim Rodríguez (ESP) (Team Katusha) 4h 07' 52" (silver) Samuel Sánchez (ESP) (Euskaltel–Euskadi) + 14" (bronze) Alejandro Valverde (ESP) (Caisse d'Epargne) + 14"
      - General classification: (1) Valverde 22h 54' 56" (2) Chris Horner (USA) (Team RadioShack) + 1" (3) Rodríguez + 34"
- Asian Championships in Sharjah, United Arab Emirates:
  - Women's Individual Time Trial, 28.4 km: (gold) Son Eun-Ju (KOR) 39' 48.43" (silver) Mayuko Hagiwara (JPN) + 9.58" (bronze) Monrudee Chapookam (THA) + 29.35"

==== Figure skating ====
- ISU World Synchronized Skating Championships in Colorado Springs, United States:
  - Short program: (1) Rockettes (Finland 1) 81.40 (2) Haydenettes (United States 1) 78.62 (3) Black Ice (Canada 2) 76.26

==== Golf ====
- Men's majors:
  - The Masters in Augusta, Georgia, United States:
    - Leaderboard after second round (USA unless stated): (1) Ian Poulter (ENG) & Lee Westwood (ENG) 136 (−8) (3) Tiger Woods, K. J. Choi (KOR), Ricky Barnes, Anthony Kim & Phil Mickelson 138 (−6)
    - Italian amateur Matteo Manassero becomes the youngest player ever to make the cut at Augusta, at age 16 years, 355 days.

==== Rugby union ====
- Heineken Cup quarter-finals:
  - Leinster (Ireland) 29–28 (France) Clermont

==== Weightlifting ====
- European Championships in Minsk, Belarus:
  - Women's 69kg:
    - Snatch: (gold) Oxana Slivenko (RUS) 117 kg (silver) Meline Daluzyan (ARM) 115 kg (bronze) Shemshat Tuliayeva (BLR) 115 kg
    - Clean & Jerk: (gold) Slivenko 145 kg (silver) Daluzyan 145 kg (bronze) Yuliya Artemova (UKR) 131 kg
    - Total: (gold) Slivenko 262 kg (silver) Daluzyan 260 kg (bronze) Tuliayeva 244 kg
  - Men's 85kg:
    - Snatch: (gold) Mikalai Novikau (BLR) 171 kg (silver) Izzet Ince (TUR) 170 kg (bronze) Ara Khachatryan (ARM) 165 kg
    - Clean & Jerk: (gold) Gevorik Poghosyan (ARM) 204 kg (silver) Khachatryan 203 kg (bronze) Iurii Chykyda (UKR) 197 kg
    - Total: (gold) Poghosyan 369 kg (silver) Khachatryan 368 kg (bronze) Novikau 367 kg

=== April 8, 2010 (Thursday) ===
==== Basketball ====
- EuroCup Women Final, second leg: (first leg score in parentheses)
  - **Sony Athinaikos** (Greece) 53–57 (65–57) (Russia) Nadezhda. Sony Athinaikos win 118–114 on aggregate.

==== Curling ====
- World Men's Championship in Cortina d'Ampezzo, Italy: (teams in **bold** advance to the playoff)
  - Draw 15:
    - Germany 4–8 **United States**
    - Italy 5–6 Denmark
    - China 3–9 **Canada**
    - Japan 9–7 Switzerland
  - Draw 16:
    - France 8–9 Italy
    - Sweden 8–2 Germany
    - **Scotland** 7–6 Japan
    - **Norway** 6–3 China
  - Draw 17:
    - Switzerland 9–7 **Scotland**
    - **Canada** 8–9 **Norway**
    - Denmark 6–4 France
    - **United States** 10–2 Sweden
      - Final standings: Norway 10–1, Canada 9–2, Scotland, USA 8–3, Denmark 7–4, Switzerland, Germany 5–6, Sweden 4–7, France, Italy, China 3–8, Japan 1–10.

==== Cycling ====
- UCI ProTour:
  - Tour of the Basque Country:
    - Stage 4: (gold) Samuel Sánchez (ESP) (Euskaltel–Euskadi) 4h 05' 16" (silver) Alejandro Valverde (ESP) (Caisse d'Epargne) + 2" (bronze) Robert Gesink (NED) (Rabobank) + 2"
      - General classification: (1) Valverde 18h 46' 50" (2) Chris Horner (USA) (Team RadioShack) + 1" (3) Gesink + 1"

==== Darts ====
- Premier League round 9 in Glasgow, Scotland:
  - Raymond van Barneveld (NED) 6–8 Adrian Lewis (ENG)
  - Simon Whitlock (AUS) 8–3 Terry Jenkins (ENG)
  - Ronnie Baxter (ENG) 4–8 Phil Taylor (ENG)
  - Mervyn King (ENG) 4–8 James Wade (ENG)
    - High Checkout: King 161
      - Standings (after 9 matches): Taylor 17 points, King, Baxter 10, Whitlock, Lewis 9, Wade 8, van Barneveld 5, Jenkins 4.

==== Football (soccer) ====
- UEFA Europa League quarter-finals, second leg: (first leg score in parentheses)
  - Wolfsburg (Germany) 0–1 (1–2) (England) **Fulham**. Fulham win 3–1 on aggregate.
  - Standard Liège (Belgium) 1–3 (1–2) (Germany) **Hamburg**. Hamburg win 5–2 on aggregate.
  - **Atlético Madrid** (Spain) 0–0 (2–2) (Spain) Valencia. 2–2 on aggregate, Atlético Madrid win on away goals.
  - **Liverpool** (England) 4–1 (1–2) (Portugal) Benfica. Liverpool win 5–3 on aggregate.
- Copa Libertadores Second Stage: (teams in **bold** advance to the round of 16, teams in ~~strike~~ are eliminated)
  - Group 1: Independiente Medellín (Colombia) 1–0 (Paraguay) ~~Cerro Porteño~~
    - Standings: Corinthians 10 points (4 matches), Racing 7 (4), Independiente Medellín 6 (5), Cerro Porteño 1 (5).
  - Group 3: **Alianza Lima** (Peru) 1–0 (Bolivia) ~~Bolívar~~
    - Standings (after 5 matches): Alianza Lima 12 points, Estudiantes 10, ~~Juan Aurich~~ 6, Bolívar 1.
  - Group 8: Flamengo (Brazil) 2–2 Universidad de Chile
    - Standings (after 4 matches): Universidad de Chile 8 points, Flamengo 7, Universidad Católica 3, Caracas 2.

==== Golf ====
- Men's majors:
  - The Masters in Augusta, Georgia, United States:
    - Leaderboard after first round (USA unless stated otherwise): (1) Fred Couples 66 (−6) (2) Tom Watson, Lee Westwood (ENG), Phil Mickelson, Y.E. Yang (KOR), K.J. Choi (KOR) 67 (−5)
    - Tiger Woods shoots 68 (−4) in his first competitive round since his sex scandal.

==== Ice hockey ====
- NHL:
  - In their last regular-season game at Mellon Arena, the Pittsburgh Penguins defeat the New York Islanders 7–3. Pens superstar Sidney Crosby becomes the third-youngest player in NHL history to collect 500 career points.
- NCAA Division I Men's Frozen Four in Detroit:
  - Wisconsin 8, RIT 1
  - Boston College 7, Miami (OH) 1

==== Weightlifting ====
- European Championships in Minsk, Belarus:
  - Women's 63kg:
    - Snatch: (gold) Svetlana Tsarukaeva (RUS) 114 kg (silver) Sibel Şimşek (TUR) 110 kg (bronze) Marina Shainova (RUS) 100 kg
    - Clean & Jerk: (gold) Şimşek 134 kg (silver) Tsarukaeva 130 kg (bronze) Roxana Cocos (ROM) 130 kg
    - Total: (gold) Şimşek 244 kg (silver) Tsarukaeva 244 kg (bronze) Valiantsi Liakhavets (BLR) 229 kg
  - Men's 77kg:
    - Snatch: (gold) Tigran Martirosyan (ARM) 165 kg (silver) Mikalai Cherniak (BLR) 161 kg (bronze) Krzysztof Szramiak (POL) 160 kg
    - Clean & Jerk: (gold) Martirosyan 195 kg (silver) Szramiak 191 kg (bronze) Erkand Qerimaj (ALB) 190 kg
    - Total: (gold) Martirosyan 360 kg (silver) Szramiak 351 kg (bronze) Cherniak 346 kg

=== April 7, 2010 (Wednesday) ===
==== Curling ====
- World Men's Championship in Cortina d'Ampezzo, Italy: (teams in **bold** advance to the playoff, teams in italics secure at least a tiebreak berth, teams in ~~strike~~ are eliminated)
  - Draw 12:
    - ~~Japan~~ 3–12 Canada
    - China 7–2 Switzerland
    - ~~Italy~~ 5–8 United States
    - Germany 9–7 Denmark
  - Draw 13:
    - Denmark 3–5 Norway
    - United States 7–5 Scotland
    - Switzerland 7–5 ~~Sweden~~
    - **Canada** 7–1 ~~France~~
  - Draw 14:
    - ~~Sweden~~ 6–4 ~~China~~
    - ~~France~~ 7–4 ~~Japan~~
    - **Norway** 8–3 Germany
    - Scotland 10–4 ~~Italy~~
      - Standings after draw 14: Canada, Norway 8–1, Scotland 7–2, USA 6–3, Germany, Denmark 5–4, Switzerland 4–5, China, France, Sweden 3–6, Italy 2–7, Japan 0–9.

==== Cycling ====
- UCI ProTour:
  - Tour of the Basque Country:
    - Stage 3: (gold) Francesco Gavazzi (ITA) (Lampre–Farnese Vini) 4h 49' 52" (silver) Óscar Freire (ESP) (Rabobank) s.t. (bronze) Peter Velits (SVK) (Team HTC–Columbia) s.t.
      - General classification: (1) Freire 14h 41' 30" (2) Alejandro Valverde (ESP) (Caisse d'Epargne) + 2" (3) Ryder Hesjedal (CAN) (Garmin–Transitions) + 3"

==== Football (soccer) ====
- 2011 FIFA Women's World Cup qualification (UEFA):
  - Group 5: Spain 5–1 Turkey
    - Standings: Spain 15 points (6 matches), England 12 (4), Turkey 6 (5), Austria 3 (4), Malta 0 (5).
- UEFA Champions League quarter-finals, second leg: (first leg score in parentheses)
  - Bordeaux (France) 1–0 (1–3) (France) **Lyon**. Lyon win 3–2 on aggregate.
    - Lyon reach the semifinal for the first time in their history.
  - Manchester United (England) 3–2 (1–2) (Germany) **Bayern Munich**. 4–4 on aggregate, Bayern Munich win on away goals.
    - With Manchester United's defeat, the UEFA Champions League will be without an English side in its semifinal for the first time since 2002–03.
- Copa Libertadores Second Stage: (teams in **bold** advance to the round of 16, teams in ~~strike~~ are eliminated)
  - Group 6: Deportivo Cuenca (Ecuador) 0–0 (Uruguay) Nacional
    - Standings (after 5 matches): Nacional 9 points, Banfield 8, Morelia 5, ~~Deportivo Cuenca~~ 4.
  - Group 8: Flamengo (Brazil) – Universidad de Chile. Postponed to April 8 due to heavy rain and flooding in Rio de Janeiro.
- AFC Cup group stage, Round 4: (teams in **bold** advance to the round of 16, teams in ~~strike~~ are eliminated)
  - Group A:
    - ~~Al-Ahli (Yemen)~~ 0–1 (Syria) Al-Karamah
    - Shabab Al-Ordon (Jordan) 3–1 (Oman) Saham
      - Standings (after 4 matches): Al-Karamah 10 points, Shabab Al-Ordon 8, Saham 4, Al-Ahli 0.
  - Group C:
    - Al-Jaish (Syria) 6–3 (Lebanon) Al-Ahed
    - Kazma (Kuwait) 0–0 (Uzbekistan) Nasaf Qarshi
      - Standings (after 4 matches): Kazma 10 points, Nasaf Qarshi 7, Al-Jaish 4, Al-Ahed 1.
  - Group E:
    - Al-Riffa (Bahrain) 1–4 (Qatar) Al-Rayyan
    - ~~Al-Nahda (Oman)~~ 1–3 (Jordan) Al-Wihdat
      - Standings (after 4 matches): Al-Rayyan, Al-Riffa 9 points, Al-Wihdat 6, Al-Nahda 0.
  - Group G:
    - ~~Persiwa Wamena (Indonesia)~~ 0–2 (Hong Kong) South China
    - VB Sports Club (Maldives) 2–3 (Thailand) Muangthong United
      - Standings (after 4 matches): Muangthong United 10 points, South China 7, VB Sports Club 6, Persiwa Wamena 0.
- CONCACAF Champions League semifinals, second leg: (first leg score in parentheses)
  - **Pachuca** (Mexico) 1–0 (1–1) (Mexico) Toluca. Pachuca win 2–1 on aggregate.

==== Weightlifting ====
- European Championships in Minsk, Belarus:
  - Women's 58kg:
    - Snatch: (gold) Nastassia Novikava (BLR) 105 kg (silver) Romela Begaj (ALB) 96 kg (bronze) Marieta Gotfryd (POL) 96 kg
    - Clean & Jerk: (gold) Novikava 133 kg (silver) Begaj 111 kg (bronze) Gotfryd 110 kg
    - Total: (gold) Novikava 238 kg (silver) Begaj (ALB) 207 kg (bronze) Gotfryd (POL) 206 kg
  - Men's 69kg:
    - Snatch: (gold) Ninel Miculescu (ROU) 153 kg (silver) Mete Binay (TUR) 149 kg (bronze) Mikhail Gobeev (RUS) 148 kg
    - Clean & Jerk: (gold) Miculescu 180 kg (silver) Gobeev 171 kg (bronze) Alexandru Spac (MDA) 168 kg
    - Total: (gold) Miculescu 333 kg (silver) Gobeev 319 kg (bronze) Binay 314 kg

=== April 6, 2010 (Tuesday) ===
==== Baseball ====
- MLB season opening games:
  - American League:
    - Tampa Bay Rays 4, Baltimore Orioles 3

==== Basketball ====
- NCAA Division I Women's Tournament Final in San Antonio:
  - Connecticut 53, Stanford 47
    - The Huskies complete a second consecutive unbeaten championship season and extend their record in NCAA final games to 7–0.

==== Curling ====
- World Men's Championship in Cortina d'Ampezzo, Italy:
  - Draw 9:
    - United States 7–5 France
    - Denmark 10–4 Sweden
    - Canada 6–2 Scotland
    - Switzerland 1–7 Norway
  - Draw 10:
    - Scotland 7–4 Germany
    - Norway 10–5 Italy
    - France 9–4 China
    - Sweden 9–5 Japan
  - Draw 11:
    - Italy 5–7 Switzerland
    - Germany 9–6 Canada
    - Japan 6–7 Denmark
    - China 5–6 United States
      - Standings after draw 11: Canada, Scotland, Norway 6–1, Denmark 5–2, Germany, USA 4–3, Switzerland 3–4, China, Italy, France, Sweden 2–5, Japan 0–7.

==== Cycling ====
- UCI ProTour:
  - Tour of the Basque Country:
    - Stage 2: (gold) Alejandro Valverde (ESP) (Caisse d'Epargne) 5h 53' 40" (silver) Óscar Freire (ESP) (Rabobank) s.t. (bronze) Francesco Gavazzi (ITA) (Lampre–Farnese Vini) + 1"
      - General classification: (1) Valverde 9h 51' 38" (2) Freire s.t. (3) Ryder Hesjedal (CAN) (Garmin–Transitions) + 1"

==== Football (soccer) ====
- UEFA Champions League quarter-finals, second leg: (first leg score in parentheses)
  - CSKA Moscow (Russia) 0–1 (0–1) (Italy) **Internazionale**. Internazionale win 2–0 on aggregate.
  - **Barcelona** (Spain) 4–1 (2–2) (England) Arsenal. Barcelona win 6–3 on aggregate.
    - Lionel Messi scores all four goals for Barcelona, his fourth hat-trick in all competitions in 2010 alone. Messi also became the sixth player in Champions League history to score four goals in a match.
- Copa Libertadores Second Stage: (teams in **bold** advance to the round of 16, teams in ~~strike~~ are eliminated)
  - Group 4: Universitario (Peru) 0–0 (Bolivia) ~~Blooming~~
    - Standings (after 5 matches): (Paraguay) Libertad, Universitario 9 points, (Argentina) Lanús 7, Blooming 1.
  - Group 7: ~~Deportivo Italia~~ (Venezuela) 2–3 (Chile) Colo-Colo
    - Standings (after 5 matches): (Brazil) Cruzeiro, (Argentina) Vélez Sársfield 10 points, Colo-Colo 7, Deportivo Italia 1.
- AFC Cup group stage, Round 4: (teams in **bold** advance to the round of 16, teams in ~~strike~~ are eliminated)
  - Group B: **Churchill Brothers** (India) 1–0 (Yemen) Al-Hilal
    - Standings: Churchill Brothers 7 points (3 matches), Al-Kuwait 2 (2), Al-Hilal 1 (3).
  - Group D:
    - Al-Nejmeh (Lebanon) 1–0 (Syria) Al-Ittihad
    - Al-Qadsia (Kuwait) 4–1 (India) ~~Kingfisher East Bengal~~
      - Standings (after 4 matches): Al-Qadsia 8 points, Al-Ittihad, Al-Nejmeh 7 points, Kingfisher East Bengal 0.
  - Group F:
    - Bình Dương (Vietnam) 2–1 (Indonesia) Sriwijaya
    - Selangor (Malaysia) 5–0 (Maldives) Victory SC
      - Standings (after 4 matches): Sriwijaya, Bình Dương 7 points, Selangor, Victory SC 4
  - Group H:
    - Geylang United (Singapore) 0–1 (Thailand) Thai Port
    - NT Realty Wofoo Tai Po (Hong Kong) 1–2 (Vietnam) **SHB Đà Nẵng**
      - Standings (after 4 matches): SHB Đà Nẵng 12 points, Thai Port 7, Geylang United 2, NT Realty Wofoo Tai Po 1.
- CONCACAF Champions League semifinals, second leg: (first leg score in parentheses)
  - **Cruz Azul** (Mexico) 5–0 (0–1) (Mexico) UNAM. Cruz Azul win 5–1 on aggregate.

==== Weightlifting ====
- European Championships in Minsk, Belarus:
  - Women's 53kg:
    - Snatch: (gold) Aylin Daşdelen (TUR) 88 kg (silver) Valiantsi Liakhavets (BLR) 87 kg (bronze) Boyanka Kostova (BUL) 87 kg
    - Clean & Jerk: (gold) Daşdelen 120 kg (ER) (silver) Kostova 112 kg (bronze) Liakhavets 111 kg
    - Total: (gold) Daşdelen 208 kg (silver) Kostova 199 kg (bronze) Liakhavets (BLR) 198 kg
  - Men's 62kg:
    - Snatch: (gold) Erol Bilgin (TUR) 139 kg (silver) Bünyamin Sezer (TUR) 136 kg (bronze) Henadzi Makhveyenia (BLR) 136 kg
    - Clean & Jerk: (gold) Antoniu Buci (ROU) 165 kg (silver) Bilgin 165 kg (bronze) Zülfügar Süleymanov (AZE) 162 kg
    - Total: (gold) Bilgin 304 kg (silver) Buci 300 kg (bronze) Süleymanov 294 kg

=== April 5, 2010 (Monday) ===
==== Baseball ====
- MLB season opening games:
  - American League:
    - Chicago White Sox 6, Cleveland Indians 0
    - Texas Rangers 5, Toronto Blue Jays 4
    - Detroit Tigers 8, Kansas City Royals 4
    - Los Angeles Angels of Anaheim 6, Minnesota Twins 3
    - Seattle Mariners 5, Oakland Athletics 3
  - National League:
    - Philadelphia Phillies 11, Washington Nationals 1
    - New York Mets 7, Florida Marlins 1
    - St. Louis Cardinals 11, Cincinnati Reds 6
    - Pittsburgh Pirates 11, Los Angeles Dodgers 5
    - Colorado Rockies 5, Milwaukee Brewers 3
    - Atlanta Braves 16, Chicago Cubs 5
    - Arizona Diamondbacks 6, San Diego Padres 3
    - San Francisco Giants 5, Houston Astros 2

==== Basketball ====
- NCAA Division I Men's Tournament Final in Indianapolis:
  - Duke 61, Butler 59
    - The Blue Devils win their fourth NCAA championship.
- Basketball Hall of Fame Class of 2010:
  - Players: Cynthia Cooper, Dennis Johnson, Gus Johnson, Karl Malone, Maciel Pereira, Scottie Pippen
  - Coaches: Bob Hurley Sr.
  - Contributors: Jerry Buss
  - Teams: 1960 USA Olympic Team, 1992 USA Olympic Men's Team (aka the "Dream Team")

==== Cricket ====
- ICC Intercontinental Shield in Windhoek, day 3:
  - Bermuda 214 (84.5 overs) and 184 (47.1 overs); Namibia 583/8d (114.5 overs; Craig Williams 110*). **Namibia win by an innings and 185 runs.**
    - Standings (after 2 matches): Uganda 29 points, Namibia 26, United Arab Emirates 17, Bermuda 0.

==== Curling ====
- World Men's Championship in Cortina d'Ampezzo, Italy:
  - Draw 6:
    - Norway 7–4 Japan
    - Scotland 8–3 China
    - Sweden 7–6 Italy
    - France 6–9 Germany
  - Draw 7:
    - China 4–8 Denmark
    - Japan 1–6 United States
    - Germany 3–4 Switzerland
    - Italy 5–7 Canada
  - Draw 8:
    - Canada 8–4 Sweden
    - Switzerland 5–4 France
    - United States 4–6 Norway
    - Denmark 4–7 Scotland
      - Standings after draw 8: Canada, Scotland 5–0, Norway 4–1, Denmark, Germany 3–2, China, Italy, USA, Switzerland 2–3, France, Sweden 1–4, Japan 0–5.

==== Cycling ====
- UCI ProTour:
  - Tour of the Basque Country:
    - Stage 1: (gold) Alejandro Valverde (ESP) (Caisse d'Epargne) 3h 57' 58" (silver) Christophe Le Mével (FRA) (Française des Jeux) s.t. (bronze) Ryder Hesjedal (CAN) (Garmin–Transitions) s.t.

==== Football (soccer) ====
- 2010 CAF Champions League First round, second leg: (first leg score in parentheses)
  - ASC Linguère (Senegal) 3–4 (0–1) (Mali) **Djoliba**. Djoliba win 5–3 on aggregate.

==== Weightlifting ====
- European Championships in Minsk, Belarus:
  - Women's 48kg:
    - Snatch: (gold) Nurcan Taylan (TUR) 90 kg (silver) Marzena Karpinska (POL) 83 kg (bronze) Genny Pagliaro (ITA) 79 kg
    - Clean & Jerk: (gold) Taylan 118 kg (silver) Karpinska 96 kg (bronze) Şaziye Okur (TUR) 95 kg
    - Total: (gold) Taylan 208 kg (ER) (silver) Karpinska 179 kg (bronze) Okur 173 kg
  - Men's 56kg:
    - Snatch: (gold) Vitali Dzerbianiou (BLR) 118 kg (silver) Tom Goegebuer (BEL) 116 kg (bronze) Iuri Dudolgo (MDA) 115 kg
    - Clean & Jerk: (gold) Smbat Margaryan (ARM) 146 kg (EJR) (silver) Sedat Artuç (TUR) 139 kg (bronze) Goegebuer 138 kg
    - Total: (gold) Dzerbianiou 256 kg (silver) Margaryan 255 kg (bronze) Goegebuer 254 kg

=== April 4, 2010 (Sunday) ===
==== American football ====
- NFL:
  - The Philadelphia Eagles trade Donovan McNabb, the franchise's leader in career wins, pass attempts, pass completions, passing yards, and passing touchdowns, to the Washington Redskins for a second-round draft pick in this year's draft and either a third- or -fourth round pick in 2011.

==== Auto racing ====
- Formula One:
  - Malaysian Grand Prix in Sepang, Malaysia: (gold) Sebastian Vettel (GER) (Red Bull–Renault) 1:33:48.412 (silver) Mark Webber (AUS) (Red Bull-Renault) +4.849 (bronze) Nico Rosberg (GER) (Mercedes) +13.504
    - Drivers' standings (after 3 of 19 races): (1) Felipe Massa (BRA) (Ferrari) 39 points (2) Fernando Alonso (Ferrari) 37 (3) Vettel 37
    - Constructors' standings: (1) Ferrari 76 points (2) McLaren–Mercedes 66 (3) Red Bull-Renault 61

==== Baseball ====
- MLB season opening game:
  - Boston Red Sox 9, New York Yankees 7

==== Basketball ====
- NCAA Division I Women's Final Four in San Antonio (seeds with region in parentheses):
  - (Sacramento 1) Stanford 73, (Kansas City 3) Oklahoma 66
  - (Dayton 1) Connecticut 70, (Memphis 4) Baylor 50

==== Cricket ====
- ICC Intercontinental Shield in Windhoek, day 2:
  - Bermuda 214; Namibia 491/6 (Raymond van Schoor 157, Ewaid Steenkamp 206). Namibia lead by 277 runs with 4 wickets remaining in the 1st innings.

==== Curling ====
- World Men's Championship in Cortina d'Ampezzo, Italy:
  - Draw 3:
    - Scotland 8–4 Sweden
    - Norway 9–3 France
  - Draw 4:
    - United States 7–5 Switzerland
    - Germany 5–6 Italy
    - China 8–6 Japan
    - Canada 8–3 Denmark
  - Draw 5:
    - France 6–8 Scotland
    - Switzerland 5–9 Canada
    - Denmark 9–7 United States
    - Sweden 4–7 Norway
      - Standings after draw 5: Canada, Scotland 3–0, Germany, China, Italy, Norway, Denmark 2–1, France, USA 1–2, Sweden, Switzerland, Japan 0–3.

==== Cycling ====
- UCI ProTour:
  - Tour of Flanders: (gold) Fabian Cancellara (SUI) (Team Saxo Bank) 6h 52' 32" (silver) Tom Boonen (BEL) (Quick-Step) + 1' 14" (bronze) Philippe Gilbert (BEL) (Omega Pharma–Lotto) + 2' 10"

==== Football (soccer) ====
- 2010 CAF Champions League First round, second leg: (first leg score in parentheses)
  - **Atlético Petróleos Luanda** (Angola) 1–0 (1–1) (Morocco) Raja Casablanca. Atlético Petróleos Luanda win 2–1 on aggregate.
  - **Dynamos** (Zimbabwe) 1–0 (1–0) (Democratic Republic of the Congo) Saint Eloi Lupopo. Dynamos win 2–0 on aggregate.
  - **TP Mazembe** (Democratic Republic of the Congo) 2–0 (0–1) (Rwanda) APR. TP Mazembe win 2–1 on aggregate.
  - **Heartland** (Nigeria) 1–1 (2–2) (Cameroon) Tiko United. 3–3 on aggregate, Heartland win on away goals rule.
  - ASEC Mimosas (Ivory Coast) 1–1 (0–1) (Zambia) **Zanaco**. Zanaco win 2–1 on aggregate.
  - **Al-Hilal Omdurman** (Sudan) 4–1 (0–0) (Ivory Coast) Africa Sports. Al-Hilal Omdurman win 4–1 on aggregate.
- 2010 CAF Confederation Cup First round, second leg: (first leg score in parentheses)
  - Costa do Sol (Mozambique) 3–2 (2–4) (Sudan) **Amal**. Amal win 6–5 on aggregate.
  - **Enyimba** (Nigeria) 3–0 (0–2) (Angola) Académica Petróleo. Enyimba win 3–2 on aggregate.
  - **Simba** (Tanzania) 2–1 (3–0) (Zimbabwe) Lengthens. Simba win 5–1 on aggregate.

==== Golf ====
- Women's majors:
  - Kraft Nabisco Championship in Palm Springs, California, United States:
    - Winner: Yani Tseng (TWN) 275 (−13)
      - Tseng wins her second major and third LPGA title in all.
- PGA Tour:
  - Shell Houston Open in Humble, Texas:
    - Winner: Anthony Kim (USA) 276 (−12)^{PO}
      - Kim wins on the fourth hole of a sudden-death playoff with countryman Vaughn Taylor to pick up his third PGA Tour title.

==== Snooker ====
- China Open in Beijing, China:
  - Final: **Mark Williams** (WAL) def. Ding Junhui (CHN) 10–6
    - Williams wins his 17th ranking title.

==== Tennis ====
- ATP World Tour:
  - Sony Ericsson Open in Key Biscayne, United States:
    - Final: **Andy Roddick** (USA) def. Tomáš Berdych (CZE) 7–5, 6–4
      - Roddick wins his second title of the year and the 29th title of his career.

==== Volleyball ====
- Women's CEV Champions League Final Four in Cannes, France:
  - Third place play-off: (bronze) RC Cannes (France) 3–0 (Italy) Asystel Novara
  - Final: (silver) Fenerbahçe Acıbadem (Turkey) 2–3 (gold) (Italy) Volley Bergamo
    - Bergamo win the title for the second straight year and seventh time overall.
    - Francesca Piccinini wins the MVP Award.

=== April 3, 2010 (Saturday) ===
==== Auto racing ====
- Nationwide Series:
  - Nashville 300 in Gladeville, Tennessee: (gold) Kevin Harvick (Chevrolet) (Kevin Harvick Incorporated) (silver) Reed Sorenson (Toyota) (Braun Racing) (bronze) Kyle Busch (Toyota) (Joe Gibbs Racing)
    - Standings after 5 of 35 races: (1) (Missouri) Carl Edwards (Ford) (Roush Fenway Racing) 820 points (2) (Michigan) Brad Keselowski (Dodge) (Penske Championship Racing) 804 (3) (Illinois) Justin Allgaier (Dodge) (Penske Championship Racing) 799
- World Rally Championship:
  - Jordan Rally in Amman: (gold) Sébastien Loeb (FRA)/Daniel Elena (MON) (Citroën C4 WRC) 3:51:35.9 (silver) Jari-Matti Latvala (FIN)/Miikka Anttila (FIN) (Ford Focus RS WRC 09) +35.8 (bronze) Petter Solberg (NOR)/Phil Mills (GBR) (Citroën C4 WRC) +1:11.8
    - Drivers' standings (after 3 of 13 races): (1) Loeb 68 points (2) Latvala 43 (3) Mikko Hirvonen (FIN) (Ford Focus RS WRC 09) 37
    - Manufacturers' standings: (1) Citroën Total World Rally Team 101 points (2) BP Ford World Rally Team 87 (3) Citroën Junior Team 48

==== Basketball ====
- NCAA Division I Men's Final Four in Indianapolis (seeds with region in parentheses):
  - (West 5) Butler 52, (Midwest 5) Michigan State 50
    - The Bulldogs advance to their first national championship game.
  - (South 1) Duke 78, (East 2) West Virginia 57
    - The Blue Devils reach the final for the first time since 2001 and the tenth time overall.
- WNIT Final in Berkeley, California:
  - California 73, Miami (FL) 61

==== Cricket ====
- ICC Intercontinental Shield in Windhoek, Namibia, day 1:
  - Bermuda 214 (84.5 overs); Namibia 36/0 (9 overs).

==== Curling ====
- World Men's Championship in Cortina d'Ampezzo, Italy:
  - Draw 1:
    - Sweden 1–5 France
    - China 4–5 Germany
    - Japan 6–7 Italy
    - Norway 4–5 Scotland
  - Draw 2:
    - Italy 6–7 China
    - Canada 6–3 United States
    - Switzerland 3–9 Denmark
    - Japan 3–9 Germany
      - Standings after draw 2: Germany 2–0, Scotland, Canada, Denmark, France 1–0, Italy, China 1–1, Switzerland, USA, Norway, Sweden 0–1, Japan 0–2.

==== Football (soccer) ====
- 2010 CAF Champions League First round, second leg: (first leg score in parentheses)
  - ASFA Yennega (Burkina Faso) 1–3 (1–4) (Tunisia) **Espérance ST**. Espérance ST win 7–2 on aggregate.
  - US Stade Tamponnaise (Réunion) 1–0 (1–3) (Egypt) **Ismaily**. Ismaily win 3–2 on aggregate.
  - **Al-Merreikh** (Sudan) 2–0 (1–1) (Chad) Gazelle FC. Al-Merreikh win 3–1 on aggregate.
  - Ferroviário Maputo (Mozambique) 2–0 (0–3) (South Africa) **Supersport United**. Supersport United win 3–2 on aggregate.
- 2010 CAF Confederation Cup First round, second leg: (first leg score in parentheses)
  - ZESCO United (Zambia) 2–0 (0–3) (Nigeria) **Warri Wolves**. Warri Wolves win 3–2 on aggregate.
  - FAR Rabat (Morocco) 1–1 (0–1) (Algeria) **CR Belouizdad**. CR Belouizdad win 2–1 on aggregate.
  - Moroka Swallows (South Africa) (South Africa) 0–1 (1–1) (Zimbabwe) **CAPS United**. CAPS United win 2–1 on aggregate.
  - **AS Vita Club** (Democratic Republic of the Congo) 3–2 (1–1) (Cameroon) Panthère de Ndé. AS Vita Club win 4–3 on aggregate.
  - **Primeiro de Agosto** (Angola) 3–0 (0–0) (Mali) CO Bamako. Primeiro de Agosto win 3–0 on aggregate.
  - **Haras El Hodood** (Egypt) 5–0 (1–1) (Ethiopia) Banks. Haras El Hodood win 6–1 on aggregate.
  - FC 105 (Gabon) 0–1 (0–0) (Democratic Republic of the Congo) **DC Motema Pembe**.DC Motema Pembe win 1–0 on aggregate.
  - **Stade Malien** (Mali) 2–0 (0–2) (Ivory Coast) Séwé Sport. 2–2 on aggregate, Stade Malien win 4–3 in penalty shootout.
  - **Cotonsport** (Cameroon) 2–0 (1–3) (Republic of the Congo) AC Léopard. 3–3 on aggregate, Cotonsport win on away goals rule.

==== Rowing ====
- 156th University Boat Race on the River Thames, London: ((GBR) unless stated)
  - **Cambridge University Boat Club** (Rob Weitemeyer (CAN), Henry Pelly, Fred Gill, Code Sternal (USA), Deaglan McEachern (USA), Peter McCelland (CAN), George Nash, Derek Rasmussen (USA), Ted Randolph) beat Oxford University Boat Club (Ben Myers, Martin Walsh (IRL), Tyler Winklevoss (USA), Cameron Winklevoss (USA), Sjoerd Hamburger (NED), Matt Evans (CAN), Simon Gawlick (GER), Charlie Burkitt, Adam Barhamand (USA)) by 1½ lengths.
    - Cambridge extend their overall lead to 80 against 75, with one dead heat.

==== Tennis ====
- WTA Tour:
  - Sony Ericsson Open in Key Biscayne, United States:
    - Final: Kim Clijsters (BEL) def. Venus Williams (USA) 6–2, 6–1
      - Clijsters wins her second title of the year and 37th of her career. It's her second title of this event, also winning in 2005.

==== Volleyball ====
- Women's CEV Champions League Final Four in Cannes, France:
  - Semifinals:
    - **Fenerbahçe Acıbadem** (Turkey) 3–2 (France) RC Cannes
    - Asystel Novara (Italy) 1–3 (Italy) **Volley Bergamo**

=== April 2, 2010 (Friday) ===
==== Football (soccer) ====
- 2010 CAF Champions League First round, second leg: (first leg score in parentheses)
  - **Gaborone United** (Botswana) 3–0 (3–0) (Mauritius) Curepipe Starlight. Gaborone United win 6–0 on aggregate.
  - **JS Kabylie** (Algeria) 1–0 (1–1) (Tunisia) Club Africain. JS Kabylie win 2–1 on aggregate.
  - Difaa El Jadida (Morocco) 1–1 (1–1) (Libya) **Ittihad**. 2–2 on aggregate (AET); Ittihad win 4–3 on penalties.
  - **ES Sétif** (Algeria) 5–0 (2–0) (Cameroon) Union Douala. ES Sétif win 7–0 on aggregate.
  - **Al-Ahly** (Egypt) 2–0 (0–1) (Zimbabwe) Gunners. Al Ahly win 2–1 on aggregate.
- 2010 CAF Confederation Cup First round, second leg: (first leg score in parentheses)
  - Khartoum (Sudan) 1–2 (0–3) (Egypt) **Petrojet**. Petrojet win 5–1 on aggregate.
  - **CS Sfaxien** (Tunisia) 1–0 (0–0) (Libya) Ahly Tripoli. CS Sfaxien win 1–0 on aggregate.
  - Étoile Sahel (Tunisia) 2–1 (0–1) (Niger) **ASFAN**. 2–2 on aggregate; ASFAN win on away goals.
  - **FUS Rabat** (Morocco) 1–0 (0–0) (Guinea) Baraka. FUS Rabat win 1–0 on aggregate.

=== April 1, 2010 (Thursday) ===
==== Basketball ====
- Euroleague Quarterfinals, game 4:
  - Real Madrid (Spain) 78–84 (Spain) Regal FC Barcelona. **Barcelona win the series 3–1.**
  - Partizan Belgrade (Serbia) 76–67 (Israel) Maccabi Tel Aviv. **Partizan win the series 3–1.**
  - Caja Laboral Baskonia (Spain) 70–74 (Russia) CSKA Moscow. **CSKA win the series 3–1.**
  - Asseco Prokom Gdynia (Poland) 70–86 (Greece) Olympiacos Piraeus. **Olympiacos win the series 3–1.**
- EuroCup Women Final, first leg:
  - Nadezhda (Russia) 57–65 (Greece) Sony Athinaikos
- NIT Final in New York City:
  - **Dayton** 79, North Carolina 68
- WNIT Semifinal in Normal, Illinois:
  - California 61, Illinois State 45

==== Darts ====
- Premier League round 8 in Cardiff, Wales:
  - Terry Jenkins (ENG) 2–8 Mervyn King (ENG)
  - Simon Whitlock (AUS) 5–8 Ronnie Baxter (ENG)
  - Adrian Lewis (ENG) 8–5 James Wade (ENG)
  - Phil Taylor (ENG) 8–2 Raymond van Barneveld (NED)
    - High Checkout: Ronnie Baxter 124
      - Standings (after 8 matches): Taylor 15 points, King, Baxter 10, Lewis, Whitlock 7, Wade 6, van Barneveld 5, Jenkins 4.

==== Football (soccer) ====
- 2011 FIFA Women's World Cup qualification (UEFA):
  - Group 2: Slovakia 0–1 Netherlands
    - Standings: Norway 12 points (4 matches), Netherlands 10 (5), Belarus 4 (3), Slovakia 3 (4), Macedonia 0 (4)
  - Group 3:
    - Scotland 8–1 Bulgaria
    - Georgia 0–7 Denmark
      - Standings: Denmark 13 points (5 matches), Scotland 12 (4), Greece 6 (4), Bulgaria 4 (5), Georgia 0 (6).
  - Group 5: England 1–0 Spain
    - Standings: England 12 points (4 matches), Spain 12 (5), Turkey 6 (4), Austria 3 (4), Malta 0 (5).
  - Group 8: Belgium 0–3 Czech Republic
    - Standings: Sweden 12 points (4 matches), Czech Republic 9 (5), Belgium 7 (7), Wales 6 (6), Azerbaijan 4 (4).
- UEFA Europa League quarter-finals, first leg:
  - Fulham (England) 2–1 (Germany) Wolfsburg
  - Hamburg (Germany) 2–1 (Belgium) Standard Liège
  - Valencia (Spain) 2–2 (Spain) Atlético Madrid
  - Benfica (Portugal) 2–1 (England) Liverpool
- Copa Libertadores: (teams in **bold** advance to the round of 16, teams in ~~strike~~ are eliminated)
  - Group 1: Corinthians (Brazil) 2–1 (Paraguay) Cerro Porteño
    - Standings (after 4 matches): Corinthians 10 points, Racing 7, Independiente Medellín 3, ~~Cerro Porteño~~ 1.
  - Group 2: Once Caldas (Colombia) 1–0 (Paraguay) Nacional
    - Standings (after 5 matches): Once Caldas 11 points, São Paulo 10, ~~Monterrey~~ 6, ~~Nacional~~ 0.
  - Group 5: Emelec (Ecuador) 0–1 (Ecuador) Deportivo Quito
    - Standings (after 4 matches): Internacional 8 points, Cerro 7, Deportivo Quito 7, ~~Emelec~~ 0.
