= February 2010 in sports =

<<	February 2010					>>
Su	Mo	Tu	We	Th	Fr	Sa
	1	2	3	4	5	6
7	8	9	10	11	12	13
14	15	16	17	18	19	20
21	22	23	24	25	26	27
28
Sports

This list shows notable sports-related deaths, events, and notable outcomes that occurred in February of 2010.

== Deaths in February ==
- 3: Dick McGuire
- 4: Bill Dudley
- 10: Eduard Vinokurov
- 12: Nodar Kumaritashvili

== Current sporting seasons ==
=== Auto racing 2010 ===
- Sprint Cup
- World Rally Championship
- Nationwide Series
- Camping World Truck Series
- V8 Supercar
- GP2 Asia Series
- Rolex Sports Car Series

=== Basketball 2010 ===
- NBA
- NCAA Division I men
- NCAA Division I women
- Euroleague
- Eurocup
- EuroChallenge
- Australia
- France
- Germany
- Greece
- Iran
- Israel
- Italy
- Philippines
  - Philippine Cup Finals
- Russia
- Spain
- Turkey

=== Cricket 2009–2010 ===
- Australia:
  - Sheffield Shield
  - Ford Ranger Cup
- Bangladesh:
  - National League
- India:
  - Ranji Trophy
- New Zealand:
  - Plunket Shield
- Pakistan:
  - Quaid-i-Azam Trophy
- South Africa:
  - SuperSport Series
- Sri Lanka:
  - Premier Trophy
- Zimbabwe:
  - Logan Cup

=== Football (soccer) 2010 ===
National teams competitions

- 2011 FIFA Women's World Cup qualification (UEFA)
- 2011 AFC Asian Cup qualification

International clubs competitions

- UEFA (Europe) Champions League
- Europa League
- UEFA Women's Champions League
- Copa Libertadores (South America)
- AFC (Asia) Champions League
- CAF (Africa) Champions League
- CAF Confederation Cup
- CONCACAF (North & Central America) Champions League
- OFC (Oceania) Champions League

Domestic (national) competitions

- Argentina
- Australia
- England
- France
- Germany
- Iran
- Italy
- Scotland
- Spain

=== Golf 2010 ===
- PGA Tour
- European Tour
- LPGA Tour
- Champions Tour

=== Ice hockey 2010 ===
- National Hockey League

=== Motorcycle racing 2010 ===
- Superbike World Championship

=== Rugby union 2010 ===
- 2011 Rugby World Cup qualifying
- Heineken Cup
- European Challenge Cup
- English Premiership
- Celtic League
- LV Cup
- Top 14
- Super 14
- Sevens World Series

=== Winter sports ===
- Alpine Skiing World Cup
- Biathlon World Cup
- Cross-Country Skiing World Cup
- Freestyle Skiing World Cup
- Nordic Combined World Cup
- Ski Jumping World Cup
- Snowboard World Cup
- Speed Skating World Cup

== Days of the month ==
=== February 28, 2010 (Sunday) ===
==== Athletics ====
- Tokyo Marathon:
  - Men: (gold) Masakazu Fujiwara (JPN) 2:12:19
  - Women: (gold) Alevtina Biktimirova (RUS) 2:34:39

==== Auto racing ====
- NASCAR Sprint Cup Series:
  - Shelby American in Las Vegas, Nevada:
    - (1) (California) Jimmie Johnson (Chevrolet, Hendrick Motorsports) (2) (California) Kevin Harvick (Chevrolet, Richard Childress Racing) (3) (California) Jeff Gordon (Chevrolet, Hendrick Motorsports)
      - Drivers' standings (after 3 of 36 races): (1) Harvick 506 points (2) (Kansas) Clint Bowyer (Chevrolet, Richard Childress Racing) 459 (3) (Arkansas) Mark Martin (Chevrolet, Hendrick Motorsports) 457

==== Bandy ====
- Women's World Championship in Drammen, Norway:
  - Bronze medal game: (bronze) Norway 3–2 Canada
  - Gold medal game: (gold) Sweden 3–2 (silver) Russia
    - Sweden win the title for the fifth consecutive time.

==== Cricket ====
- Australia in New Zealand:
  - 2nd T20I in Christchurch:
    - New Zealand 214/6 (20 overs, BB McCullum 116*); Australia 214/4 (20 overs). **Match tied; New Zealand win the Super Over. 2-match series drawn 1–1.**
- England in Bangladesh:
  - 1st ODI in Mirpur:
    - Bangladesh 228 (45.4 overs, Tamim Iqbal 125); England 229/4 (46 overs). **England won by 6 wickets, lead 3-match series 1–0.**
- Zimbabwe in West Indies:
  - Only T20I in Port of Spain, Trinidad:
    - Zimbabwe 105 (19.5 overs); West Indies 79/7 (20 overs). **Zimbabwe win by 26 runs, win 1-match series 1–0.**

==== Field hockey ====
- Men's World Cup in New Delhi, India:
  - Pool B:
    - South Africa 2–4 Spain
    - Australia 2–3 England
    - India 4–1 Pakistan

==== Football (soccer) ====
- (England) Football League Cup Final at Wembley Stadium, London:
  - Aston Villa 1–2 **Manchester United**
    - Manchester United win the trophy for the fourth time.

==== Golf ====
- PGA Tour:
  - Phoenix Open in Scottsdale, Arizona:
    - Winner: Hunter Mahan (USA) 268 (−16)
      - Mahan wins his second PGA Tour title.
- LPGA Tour:
  - HSBC Women's Champions in Singapore:
    - Winner: Ai Miyazato (JPN) 278 (−10)
      - Miyazato completes a sweep of both events in the tour's opening Asian swing, giving her three LPGA Tour titles in her career.

==== Motorcycle racing ====
- Superbike:
  - Phillip Island Superbike World Championship round in Phillip Island (Victoria), Australia:
    - Race 1: (1) Leon Haslam (UK) (Suzuki GSX-R1000) (2) Michel Fabrizio (ITA) (Ducati 1098R) (3) Noriyuki Haga (JPN) (Ducati 1098R)
      - Haslam wins the race by 0.004 seconds, the closest-recorded finish in the history of the Superbike World Championship.
    - Race 2: (1) Carlos Checa (ESP) (Ducati 1098R) (2) Haslam (3) Fabrizio
      - Rider's standings (after 2 of 26 races): (1) Haslam 45 points (2) Fabrizio 36 (3) Checa 34.
- Supersport:
  - Phillip Island Supersport World Championship round in Phillip Island (Victoria), Australia:
    - (1) Eugene Laverty (IRL) (Honda CBR600RR) (2) Joan Lascorz (ESP) (Kawasaki ZX-6R) (3) Kenan Sofuoğlu (TUR) (Honda CBR600RR)
      - Rider's standings (after 1 of 13 races): (1) Laverty 25 points (2) Lascorz 20 (3) Sofuoğlu 16.

==== Olympic Games ====
- Winter Olympics in Vancouver, Canada:
  - Cross-country skiing – Men's 50 kilometre classical: (gold) Petter Northug (NOR) 2:05:35.5 (silver) Axel Teichmann (GER) +0.3 (bronze) Johan Olsson (SWE) +1.0
    - Northug wins his second title and fourth medal of the Games, and becomes the most decorated male athlete.
    - Olsson wins his third medal of the Games and the fourth medal of his career.
  - Ice hockey – Men:
    - Gold medal game: (silver) United States 2–3 (OT) (gold) Canada
      - Sidney Crosby's goal after 7:40 minutes in overtime gives Canada their fourteenth gold medal of the Games, the most earned by a country in a single Winter Olympics.
      - Team Canada becomes the fourth team, after the United States men in 1960 and 1980 and Canada's women in these Games, to win the gold medal on home ice.
      - Team Canada player Eric Staal and coach Mike Babcock become the newest members of the Triple Gold Club, consisting of individuals who have won an Olympic gold, a World Championship gold, and the Stanley Cup. Babcock becomes the first coach in history to win all three competitions.
      - The USA win their 37th medal, the most by any country in a single Winter Olympics.
  - General records:
    - Norwegian cross-country skier Marit Bjørgen is the most decorated athlete of the Games, with five medals, including three gold. Her teammate Petter Northug is the most decorated man, with four medals (2 gold).
    - Chinese short track speed skater Wang Meng is the only other triple gold medallist.

==== Tennis ====
- ATP World Tour:
  - Dubai Tennis Championships in Dubai, United Arab Emirates:
    - Final: **Novak Djokovic** (SRB) def. Mikhail Youzhny (RUS) 7–5, 5–7, 6–3
      - Djokovic wins his 17th career title and his second successive title at this event.
  - Delray Beach International Tennis Championships in Delray Beach, United States:
    - Final: **Ernests Gulbis** (LAT) def. Ivo Karlović (CRO) 6–2, 6–3
      - Gulbis wins his first career title.
- WTA Tour:
  - Malaysia Classic in Kuala Lumpur, Malaysia:
    - Final: **Alisa Kleybanova** (RUS) def. Elena Dementieva (RUS) 6–3, 6–2
      - Kleybanova wins her first career title.

=== February 27, 2010 (Saturday) ===
==== Auto racing ====
- Nationwide Series:
  - Sam's Town 300 in Las Vegas, Nevada:
    - (1) (California) Kevin Harvick (Chevrolet, Kevin Harvick Incorporated) (2) (Virginia) Denny Hamlin (Toyota, Joe Gibbs Racing) (3) (Missouri) Carl Edwards (Ford, Roush Fenway Racing)
      - Drivers' standings (after 3 of 35 races): (1) Edwards 505 points (2) (Michigan) Brad Keselowski (Dodge, Penske Racing) 464 (3) (North Carolina) Brian Vickers (Toyota, Braun Racing) 457
- V8 Supercars:
  - Desert 400 in Sakhir, Bahrain
    - Race 4: (1) Jamie Whincup (AUS) (Holden Commodore) (2) Mark Winterbottom (AUS) (Ford Falcon) (3) Shane van Gisbergen (NZL) (Ford Falcon)
      - Drivers' standings (after 4 of 26 races): (1) Whincup 600 points (2) Winterbottom 543 (3) Van Gisbergen 471

==== Cricket ====
- South Africa In India:
  - 3rd ODI in Ahmedabad:
    - South Africa 365/2 (50 overs, JH Kallis 104*, AB de Villiers 102*); India 275 (44.3 overs). **South Africa win by 90 runs. India win 3-match series 2–1.**

==== Olympic Games ====
- Winter Olympics in Vancouver, Canada:
  - Alpine skiing – men's slalom: (gold) Giuliano Razzoli (ITA) 1:39.32 (silver) Ivica Kostelić (CRO) +0.16 (bronze) André Myhrer (SWE) +0.44
    - Kostelić wins his second medal of the Games (both silver) and the third medal of his career.
    - The Austrian men fail to win a medal in alpine skiing for the first time since 1936.
  - Bobsleigh – four-man: (gold) Steven Holcomb/Steve Mesler/Curtis Tomasevicz/Justin Olsen (USA) 3:24.46 (silver) André Lange/Kevin Kuske/Alexander Rödiger/Martin Putze (GER) +0.38 (bronze) Lyndon Rush/David Bissett/Lascelles Brown/Chris le Bihan (CAN) +0.39
    - Team United States win their first gold medal in bobsleigh since 1948.
    - Lange and Kuske both win the fifth medal of their career, but fail to win the four-man title for the third successive time.
  - Cross-country skiing – women's 30 kilometre classical: (gold) Justyna Kowalczyk (POL) 1:30:33.7 (silver) Marit Bjørgen (NOR) +0.3 (bronze) Aino-Kaisa Saarinen (FIN) +1:05.0
    - Kowalczyk wins the fourth medal of her career, and becomes the first ever woman from Poland to win gold medal at the Winter Olympics, and only the second Polish champion in Winter Olympics history.
    - Bjørgen wins her fifth medal of the Games, and the seventh medal of her career. She is the most decorated athlete of the Games, with three gold medals, one silver and one bronze.
    - Saarinen wins the third medal of her career.
  - Curling – men's tournament:
    - Bronze medal final: Sweden (Edin) 4–5 (bronze) Switzerland (Stöckli)
    - Gold medal final: (gold) Canada (Martin) 6–3 (silver) Norway (Ulsrud)
      - The Canadian team, led by skip Kevin Martin, win the title for the second successive time, and become the first unbeaten winner in Olympic curling history.
  - Snowboarding – men's parallel giant slalom: (gold) Jasey-Jay Anderson (CAN) (silver) Benjamin Karl (AUT) (bronze) Mathieu Bozzetto (FRA)
  - Speed skating – men's team pursuit:
    - Final A: (gold) Mathieu Giroux/Lucas Makowsky/Denny Morrison (CAN) 3:41.37 def. (silver) Brian Hansen/Chad Hedrick/Jonathan Kuck/Trevor Marsicano (USA) +0.21
    - Final B: (bronze) Jan Blokhuijsen/Sven Kramer/Simon Kuipers/Mark Tuitert (NED) 3:39.95 OR def. Håvard Bøkko/Henrik Christiansen/Fredrik van der Horst (NOR) +0.55
      - Hedrick wins the fifth medal of his career.
      - Kramer wins the fourth medal of his career.
      - Tuitert wins the third medal of his career.
  - Speed skating – women's team pursuit:
    - Final A: (gold) Daniela Anschütz-Thoms/Stephanie Beckert/Anni Friesinger-Postma/Katrin Mattscherodt (GER) 3:02.82 def. (silver) Masako Hozumi/Nao Kodaira/Maki Tabata (JPN) +0.02
    - Final B: (bronze) Katarzyna Bachleda-Curuś/Katarzyna Woźniak/Luiza Złotkowska (POL) 3:03.73 def. Catherine Raney-Norman/Jennifer Rodriguez/Jilleanne Rookard (USA) +1.57
      - Beckert wins her third medal of the Games.
      - Friesinger-Postma wins the third title and the fifth medal of her career.
      - Poland win its first medal in speed skating since 1960.
  - Ice hockey – men's tournament:
    - Bronze medal game: (bronze) Finland 5–3 Slovakia

==== Rugby union ====
- Six Nations Championship, week 3:
  - Italy 16–12 Scotland in Rome
  - England 16–20 Ireland in London
    - Standings (after three matches): France 6 points, England, Ireland 4, Wales, Italy 2, Scotland 0.
- 2011 Rugby World Cup qualifying:
  - European Nations Cup First Division, matchday 8: (teams in **bold** qualify for the 2011 Rugby World Cup, teams in ~~strike~~ are eliminated from qualifying contention)
    - ~~Germany~~ 0–69 Portugal in Heusenstamm
    - **Georgia** 17–9 ~~Spain~~ in Tbilisi
    - **Russia** 21–21 Romania in Sochi
      - Russia qualify for their first World Cup ever.
      - Standings (after 8 matches unless indicated): Georgia 23 points, Russia 21, Portugal 17, Romania 14 (7), Spain 9 (7), Germany 8.

==== Tennis ====
- ATP Tour:
  - Abierto Mexicano Telcel in Acapulco, Mexico:
    - Final: **David Ferrer** (ESP) def. Juan Carlos Ferrero (ESP) 6–3, 3–6, 6–1
      - Ferrer wins the eighth title of his career.
- WTA Tour:
  - Abierto Mexicano Telcel in Acapulco, Mexico:
    - Final: **Venus Williams** (USA) def. Polona Hercog (SLO) 2–6, 6–2, 6–3
      - Williams wins her second title in successive weeks and the 43rd title of her career. She also wins this event for the second straight year.

=== February 26, 2010 (Friday) ===
==== Auto racing ====
- V8 Supercars:
  - Desert 400 in Sakhir, Bahrain:
    - Race 3: (1) Jamie Whincup (AUS) (Holden Commodore) (2) Mark Winterbottom (AUS) (Ford Falcon) (3) Craig Lowndes (AUS) (Holden Commodore)
      - Drivers' standings (after 3 of 26 races): (1) Whincup 450 points (2) Winterbottom 405 (3) Lowndes 378

==== Cricket ====
- Australia in New Zealand:
  - 1st T20I in Wellington:
    - New Zealand 118 (20 overs); Australia 119/4 (16.0 overs). **Australia win by 6 wickets, lead 2-match series 1–0.**

==== Olympic Games ====
- Winter Olympics in Vancouver, Canada:
  - Alpine skiing – Women's slalom: (gold) Maria Riesch (GER) 1:42.89 (silver) Marlies Schild (AUT) +0.43 (bronze) Šárka Záhrobská (CZE) +1.01
    - Riesch wins her second title of the Games.
    - Záhrobská wins the first ever medal for the Czech Republic in alpine skiing.
  - Biathlon – Men's relay: (gold) Halvard Hanevold/Tarjei Bø/Emil Hegle Svendsen/Ole Einar Bjørndalen (NOR) 1:21:38.1 (0 penalty loops + 7 missed shots) (silver) Simon Eder/Daniel Mesotitsch/Dominik Landertinger/Christoph Sumann (AUT) +38.6 (1 + 9) (bronze) Ivan Tcherezov/Anton Shipulin/Maxim Tchoudov/Evgeny Ustyugov (RUS) +38.8 (0 + 4)
    - Bjørndalen wins the sixth title and the 11th medal of his career.
    - Hanevold wins the third title and the sixth medal of his career.
    - Svendsen wins his second title and third medal of the Games.
    - Austria win its first ever medal in the men's relay.
  - Curling – Women:
    - Bronze medal final: (bronze) China (Wang) 12–6 Switzerland (Ott)
      - China win the first ever medal in curling.
    - Gold medal final: (silver) Canada (Bernard) 6–7 (gold) Sweden (Norberg)
      - The Swedish team of Anette Norberg, Eva Lund, Cathrine Lindahl and Anna Le Moine win the title for the second successive time.
  - Short track speed skating – Men's 500 metres: (gold) Charles Hamelin (CAN) 40.981 (silver) Sung Si-bak (KOR) +0.359 (bronze) François-Louis Tremblay (CAN) +6.385
    - Hamelin sets a new Olympic record of 40.770 in the quarter-final.
  - Short track speed skating – Women's 1000 metres: (gold) Wang Meng (CHN) 1:29.213 (silver) Katherine Reutter (USA) +0.111 (bronze) Park Seung-hi (KOR) +0.166
    - Wang wins her third title of the Games, and the fourth title and sixth medal of her career.
    - China win all four women's events.
    - Zhou Yang (CHN) sets a new world record of 1:29.049 in the semi-final, but is disqualified in the final.
  - Short track speed skating – Men's 5000 metre relay: (gold) Charles Hamelin/François Hamelin/Olivier Jean/François-Louis Tremblay (CAN) 6:44.24 (silver) Kwak Yoon-gy/Lee Ho-suk/Lee Jung-su/Sung Si-bak (KOR) +0.202 (bronze) J. R. Celski/Travis Jayner/Jordan Malone/Apolo Ohno (USA) +0.274
    - Charles Hamelin wins his second title of the Games and third medal of his career.
    - Tremblay wins the second title and fifth medal of his career.
    - Ohno wins his third medal of the Games, and the eighth medal of his career.
    - Lee Ho-suk wins the fifth medal of his career.
    - Lee Jung-su wins his third medal of the Games.
  - Snowboarding – Women's parallel giant slalom: (gold) Nicolien Sauerbreij (NED) (silver) Ekaterina Ilyukhina (RUS) (bronze) Marion Kreiner (AUT)
    - Sauerbreij wins the first medal for Netherlands in a winter sport other than speed skating or figure skating.
  - Bobsleigh – Four-man:
    - Standings after 2 runs: (1) Steven Holcomb/Steve Mesler/Curtis Tomasevicz/Justin Olsen (USA) 1:41.75 (2) Lyndon Rush/David Bissett/Lascelles Brown/Chris le Bihan (CAN) +0.40 (3) André Lange/Kevin Kuske/Alexander Rödiger/Martin Putze (GER) +0.44
  - Ice hockey – Men:
    - Semifinals:
      - United States 6–1 Finland
      - Canada 3–2 Slovakia
        - USA and Canada will meet in a repeat of the 2002 Olympic final.

==== Rugby union ====
- Six Nations Championship, week 3:
  - Wales 20–26 France in Cardiff
    - Standings: France 6 points (3 matches), England 4 (2), Ireland 2 (2), Wales 2 (3), Scotland, Italy 0 (2).

=== February 25, 2010 (Thursday) ===
==== Basketball ====
- Euroleague Top 16, matchday 4 (teams eliminated from quarterfinal contention in ~~strike~~):
  - Group E:
    - ~~Panathinaikos Athens~~ (Greece) 67–70 (Spain) Regal FC Barcelona
    - Partizan Belgrade (Serbia) 79–76 (Greece) Maroussi Athens
      - Standings: Barcelona, Partizan 3–1; Maroussi 2–2; Panathinaikos 0–4.
  - Group F: Real Madrid (Spain) 77–69 (Italy) Montepaschi Siena
    - Standings: Maccabi Tel Aviv, Real Madrid, Efes Pilsen, Montepaschi 2–2.
  - Group G: Žalgiris Kaunas (Lithuania) 89–84 (Spain) Unicaja Málaga
    - Standings: CSKA Moscow, Asseco Prokom Gdynia 3–1; Unicaja, Žalgiris 1–3.
  - Group H: Khimki Moscow Region (Russia) 83–94 (Spain) Caja Laboral Baskonia
    - Standings: Olympiacos Piraeus 4–0; Caja Laboral Baskonia, Khimki Moscow Region 2–2; Cibona Zagreb 0–4.

==== Darts ====
- Premier League round 3 in Belfast, Northern Ireland:
  - Mervyn King (ENG) 6–8 Ronnie Baxter (ENG)
  - Adrian Lewis (ENG) 6–8 Terry Jenkins (ENG)
  - Simon Whitlock (AUS) 8–5 Raymond van Barneveld (NED)
  - Phil Taylor (ENG) 8–2 James Wade (ENG)
    - High Checkout: Ronnie Baxter 164
      - Standings (after three rounds): Taylor 6 points, King, Jenkins 4, Baxter, Whitlock 3, Lewis, van Barneveld 2, Wade 0.

==== Football (soccer) ====
- UEFA Europa League Round of 32, second leg:
  - Anderlecht (Belgium) 4–0 (1–1) (Spain) Athletic Bilbao. Anderlecht win 5–1 on aggregate.
  - Marseille (France) 3–1 (3–1) (Denmark) Copenhagen. Marseille win 6–2 on aggregate.
  - Roma (Italy) 2–3 (2–3) (Greece) Panathinaikos. Panathinaikos win 6–4 on aggregate.
  - Galatasaray (Turkey) 1–2 (1–1) (Spain) Atlético Madrid. Atlético Madrid win 3–2 on aggregate.
  - Shakhtar Donetsk (Ukraine) 1–1 (1–2) (England) Fulham. Fulham win 3–2 on aggregate.
  - Unirea Urziceni (Romania) 1–3 (0–1) (England) Liverpool. Liverpool win 4–1 on aggregate.
  - PSV Eindhoven (Netherlands) 3–2 (0–1) (Germany) Hamburg. 3–3 on aggregate, Hamburg win on away goals.
  - Wolfsburg (Germany) 4–1 (2–2) (Spain) Villarreal. Wolfsburg win 6–3 on aggregate.
  - Red Bull Salzburg (Austria) 0–0 (2–3) (Belgium) Standard Liège. Standard Liège win 3–2 on aggregate.
  - Werder Bremen (Germany) 4–1 (0–1) (Netherlands) Twente. Werder Bremen win 4–2 on aggregate.
  - Fenerbahçe (Turkey) 1–1 (1–2) (France) Lille. Lille win 3–2 on aggregate.
  - Sporting CP (Portugal) 3–0 (1–2) (England) Everton. Sporting win 4–2 on aggregate.
  - Juventus (Italy) 0–0 (2–1) (Netherlands) Ajax. Juventus win 2–1 on aggregate.
  - Valencia (Spain) 3–0 (0–1) (Belgium) Club Brugge (after extra time). Valencia win 3–1 on aggregate.
  - Hapoel Tel Aviv (Israel) 0–0 (0–3) (Russia) Rubin Kazan. Rubin Kazan win 3–0 on aggregate.
- Copa Libertadores second stage:
  - Group 2: Once Caldas (Colombia) 2–1 (Brazil) São Paulo
    - Standings (after 2 matches): Once Caldas 6 points, São Paulo, Monterrey 3, Nacional 0.
  - Group 4:
    - Blooming (Bolivia) 1–4 (Argentina) Lanús
    - Universitario (Peru) 0–0 (Paraguay) Libertad
      - Standings (after 3 matches): Libertad, Universitario 7 points, Lanús 3, Blooming 0.

==== Olympic Games ====
- Winter Olympics in Vancouver, Canada:
  - Alpine skiing – Women's giant slalom: (gold) Viktoria Rebensburg (GER) 2:27.11 (silver) Tina Maze (SLO) +0.04 (bronze) Elisabeth Görgl (AUT) +0.14
    - Rebensburg's title is her first ever win as a senior.
  - Cross-country skiing – Women's 4 x 5 kilometre relay: (gold) Vibeke Skofterud/Therese Johaug/Kristin Størmer Steira/Marit Bjørgen (NOR) 55:19.5 (silver) Katrin Zeller/Evi Sachenbacher-Stehle/Miriam Gössner/Claudia Nystad (GER) +24.6 (bronze) Pirjo Muranen/Virpi Kuitunen/Riitta-Liisa Roponen/Aino-Kaisa Saarinen (FIN) +30.4
    - Bjørgen wins her third title and fourth medal of the Games, and the sixth medal of her career.
    - Sachenbacher-Stehle wins the fifth medal of her career.
  - Figure skating – Ladies' singles: (gold) Kim Yuna (KOR) 228.56 WR (Free skating 150.06 WR) (silver) Mao Asada (JPN) 205.50 (bronze) Joannie Rochette (CAN) 202.64
    - Kim wins the first ever medal for Korea in figure skating, and smashes her own world record by 18 points.
    - Rochette wins the first medal for Canada in the women's event since Elizabeth Manley in 1988, just few days after the sudden death of her mother.
    - The United States fail to win a medal in the women's event for the first time since 1964, the Olympics that followed the airplane crash that decimated the entire US figure skating world team.
    - Asia emerge as the leading continent in figure skating for the first time with two titles and five medals.
    - Russia or the Soviet Union, and the entire European continent, fail to win any title in figure skating for the first time since 1960.
  - Freestyle skiing – Men's aerials: (gold) Aleksei Grishin (BLR) 248.41 (silver) Jeret Peterson (USA) 247.21 (bronze) Liu Zhongqing (CHN) 242.53
    - Grishin wins the first ever gold medal for Belarus in the Winter Olympics.
  - Nordic combined – Individual large hill/10 km: (gold) Bill Demong (USA) 25:32.9 (silver) Johnny Spillane (USA) +4.0 (bronze) Bernhard Gruber (AUT) +10.8
    - Demong becomes the first American Olympic champion in any Nordic skiing discipline, while Spillane wins his third silver medal of the Games. The United States, that never won a medal in Nordic combined before these Games, finished as the most successful team in this sport.
  - Ice hockey – Women:
    - Bronze medal game: Sweden 2–3 (OT) (bronze) Finland
    - Gold medal game: (gold) Canada 2–0 (silver) United States
      - Canada win the title for the third successive time and extend its winning streak to 15 games.
  - Curling – Men:
    - Semifinals:
      - Sweden (Edin) 3–6 Canada (Martin)
      - Switzerland (Stöckli) 5–7 Norway (Ulsrud)
  - Curling – Women:
    - Semifinals:
      - Canada (Bernard) 6–5 Switzerland (Ott)
      - China (Wang) 4–9 Sweden (Norberg)

=== February 24, 2010 (Wednesday) ===
==== Basketball ====
- Euroleague Top 16, matchday 4:
  - Group F: Efes Pilsen Istanbul (Turkey) 63–56 (Israel) Maccabi Tel Aviv
    - Standings: Montepaschi Siena 2–1, Maccabi Tel Aviv, Efes Pilsen Istanbul 2–2, Real Madrid 1–2.
  - Group G: Asseco Prokom Gdynia (Poland) 88–81 (Russia) CSKA Moscow
    - Standings: CSKA Moscow, Asseco Prokom Gdynia 3–1, Unicaja Málaga 1–2, Žalgiris Kaunas 0–3.
  - Group H: Cibona Zagreb (Croatia) 94–97 (Greece) Olympiacos Piraeus
    - Standings: Olympiacos Piraeus 4–0, Caja Laboral Baskonia 2–1, Khimki Moscow Region 1–2, Cibona Zagreb 0–4.

==== Cricket ====
- South Africa In India:
  - 2nd ODI in Gwalior:
    - India 401/3 (50 overs, Sachin Tendulkar 200*); South Africa 248 (42.5 overs, AB de Villiers 114*). **India win by 153 runs, lead the 3-match series 2–0.**
      - Tendulkar hits the highest individual score in the history of One Day International cricket, and becomes the first batsman to score a double century.

==== Football (soccer) ====
- UEFA Champions League Round of 16, first leg:
  - CSKA Moscow (Russia) 1–1 (Spain) Sevilla
  - Internazionale (Italy) 2–1 (England) Chelsea
- Copa Libertadores second stage:
  - Group 1: Corinthians (Brazil) 2–1 (Uruguay) Racing
    - Standings (after 1 match): Corinthians 3 points, Independiente Medellín, Cerro Porteño 1, Racing 0.
  - Group 2: Monterrey (Mexico) 2–1 (Paraguay) Nacional
    - Standings: Once Caldas, São Paulo 3 points (1 match), Monterrey 3 (2), Nacional 0 (2)
  - Group 3: Juan Aurich (Peru) 2–0 (Bolivia) Bolívar
    - Standings (after 2 matches): Alianza Lima 6 points, Estudiantes, Juan Aurich 3, Bolívar 0.
  - Group 7: Cruzeiro (Brazil) 4–1 (Chile) Colo-Colo
    - Standings (after 2 matches): Vélez Sarsfield 6 points, Cruzeiro, Colo-Colo 3, Deportivo Italia 0.
  - Group 8: Flamengo (Brazil) 2–0 Universidad Católica
    - Standings (after 1 match): Flamengo, Universidad de Chile 3 points, Caracas, Universidad Católica 0.
- AFC Champions League, Round 1:
  - Group C:
    - Al-Ain (United Arab Emirates) 0–1 (Uzbekistan) Pakhtakor Tashkent
    - Al-Shabab (Saudi Arabia) 1–1 (Iran) Sepahan
  - Group D:
    - Al-Sadd (Qatar) 0–3 (Saudi Arabia) Al-Hilal
    - Mes Kerman (Iran) 4–2 (United Arab Emirates) Al-Ahli
  - Group G:
    - Suwon Samsung Bluewings (South Korea) 0–0 (Japan) Gamba Osaka
    - Henan Construction (China) 0–0 Singapore Armed Forces
  - Group H:
    - Sanfrecce Hiroshima (Japan) 0–1 (China) Shandong Luneng
    - Adelaide United (Australia) 1–0 (South Korea) Pohang Steelers
- International friendlies
  - Under-17 men's match at Raymond James Stadium, Tampa, Florida, United States: United States 4–1 Mexico
  - Men's match at Raymond James Stadium, Tampa, Florida, United States: United States 2–1 El Salvador
  - Men's match at Estadio Azteca, Mexico City: Mexico 5–0 Bolivia

==== Olympic Games ====
- Winter Olympics in Vancouver, Canada:
  - Bobsleigh – Two-woman: (gold) Kaillie Humphries/Heather Moyse (CAN) 3:32.28 (silver) Helen Upperton/Shelley-Ann Brown (CAN) +0.85 (bronze) Erin Pac/Elana Meyers (USA) +1.12
    - Canadian women win their first medals in bobsleigh.
  - Cross-country skiing – Men's 4 x 10 kilometre relay: (gold) Daniel Rickardsson/Johan Olsson/Anders Södergren/Marcus Hellner (SWE) 1:45:05.4 (silver) Martin Johnsrud Sundby/Odd-Bjørn Hjelmeset/Lars Berger/Petter Northug (NOR) +15.9 (bronze) Martin Jakš/Lukáš Bauer/Jiří Magál/Martin Koukal (CZE) +16.5
    - Hellner wins his second title of the Games.
    - Northug wins his third medal of the Games.
    - Olsson wins the third medal of his career.
    - Sweden win its first gold medal in the men's relay since 1988.
    - Czech Republic win its first ever medal in any relay event.
  - Freestyle skiing – Women's aerials: (gold) Lydia Lassila (AUS) 214.74 (silver) Li Nina (CHN) 207.23 (bronze) Guo Xinxin (CHN) 205.22
    - Li, the three-time reigning world champion in this event, has to settle for Olympic silver for the second time.
  - Short track speed skating – Women's 3000 metre relay: (gold) Sun Linlin/Wang Meng/Zhang Hui/Zhou Yang (CHN) 4:06.610 WR (silver) Jessica Gregg/Kalyna Roberge/Marianne St-Gelais/Tania Vicent (CAN) +2.527 (bronze) Allison Baver/Alyson Dudek/Lana Gehring/Katherine Reutter (USA) +7.471
    - South Korea initially win the race but disqualified, and thus has its four-time winning streak in this event ended.
    - Wang wins her second title of the Games, and the third title and fourth medal of her career.
    - Zhou also win her second title of the Games.
  - Speed skating – Women's 5000 metres: (gold) Martina Sáblíková (CZE) 6:50.92 (silver) Stephanie Beckert(GER) +0.48 (bronze) Clara Hughes (CAN) +4.82
    - Sáblíková wins her second title and third medal of the Games.
    - Hughes wins the fourth medal of her career in speed skating and her sixth medal overall (she also won two Olympic medals in cycling).
  - Alpine skiing – Women's giant slalom:
    - Standings after 1 run: (1) Elisabeth Görgl (AUT) 1:15.12 (2) Taïna Barioz (FRA) +0.02 (3) Kathrin Zettel (AUT) +0.16
      - The second run is postponed due to bad weather and rescheduled to February 25.
  - Ice hockey – Men:
    - Quarterfinals:
      - United States 2–0 Switzerland
      - Russia 3–7 Canada
      - Finland 2–0 Czech Republic
      - Sweden 3–4 Slovakia
  - Curling – Men:
    - Tie-breaker: Sweden (Edin) 7–6 Great Britain (Murdoch)

=== February 23, 2010 (Tuesday) ===
==== Basketball ====
- ULEB Eurocup Last 16, matchday 4 (teams clinching a quarterfinal berth in **bold**; teams eliminated in ~~strike~~):
  - Group I:
    - Aris BSA 2003 (Greece) 80–67 (Germany) ALBA Berlin
    - DKV Joventut (Spain) 80–73 (France) Le Mans
      - Standings: Joventut 3–1; Aris, ALBA 2–2; Le Mans 1–3.
  - Group J:
    - Hapoel Jerusalem (Israel) 82–73 (Russia) UNICS Kazan
    - Power Elec Valencia (Spain) 98–95 (Turkey) ~~Galatasaray Café Crown~~ (OT)
      - Standings: Hapoel, Valencia 3–1; UNICS 2–2; Galatasaray 0–4.
  - Group K:
    - **Bizkaia Bilbao Basket** (Spain) 76–66 (Germany) Brose Baskets
    - ~~Benetton Basket~~ (Italy) 81–85 (Greece) Panellinios BC
      - Standings: Bilbao 4–0, Panellinios 3–1, Brose 1–3, Benetton 0–4.
  - Group L:
    - ČEZ Nymburk (Czech Republic) 79–71 (Spain) Gran Canaria 2014 (OT)
    - Crvena zvezda (Serbia) 76–78 (Turkey) Türk Telekom
      - Standings: Crvena zvezda 3–1; Gran Canaria 2014, Nymburk 2–2; Türk Telekom 1–3.

==== Cricket ====
- West Indies in Australia:
  - 2nd T20I in Hobart:
    - West Indies 138/7 (20 overs); Australia 142/2 (11.4 overs). **Australia win by 8 wickets, win the 2-match series 2–0.**
- ICC Intercontinental Cup, day 4:
  - Canada 566 (151.5 overs) and 191/4d (40.0 overs); Afghanistan 264 (79.0 overs) and 494/4 (106.4 overs, Mohammad Shahzad 215*) in Sharjah, United Arab Emirates. **Afghanistan win by 6 wickets.**
  - Netherlands 385 (105.1 overs) and 367/6d (91.0 overs); Kenya 433 (110.0 overs) and 320/5 (62.0 overs) in Nairobi. **Kenya win by 5 wickets.**
    - Standings: Afghanistan 57 points (4 matches), Scotland 49 (3), Kenya 43 (5), Zimbabwe XI 23 (2), Netherlands 15 (3), Ireland 12 (3), Canada 9 (4).

==== Football (soccer) ====
- UEFA Champions League Round of 16, first leg:
  - Stuttgart (Germany) 1–1 (Spain) Barcelona
  - Olympiacos (Greece) 0–1 (France) Bordeaux
- UEFA Europa League Round of 32, second leg: (first leg score in parentheses)
  - Benfica (Portugal) 4–0 (1–1) (Germany) Hertha BSC. Benfica win 5–1 on aggregate.
- AFC Champions League, Round 1:
  - Group A:
    - Al-Jazira (United Arab Emirates) 1–2 (Qatar) Al-Gharafa
    - Al-Ahli (Saudi Arabia) 1–2 (Iran) Esteghlal
  - Group B:
    - Bunyodkor (Uzbekistan) 3–0 (Saudi Arabia) Al-Ittihad
    - Zob Ahan (Iran) 1–0 (United Arab Emirates) Al-Wahda
  - Group E:
    - Seongnam Ilhwa Chunma (South Korea) 2–0 (Japan) Kawasaki Frontale
    - Beijing Guoan (China) 1–0 (Australia) Melbourne Victory
  - Group F:
    - Persipura Jayapura (Indonesia) 1–4 (South Korea) Jeonbuk Hyundai Motors
    - Kashima Antlers (Japan) 1–0 (China) Changchun Yatai
- Copa Libertadores second stage:
  - Group 5: Internacional (Brazil) 2–1 (Ecuador) Emelec
  - Group 6: Morelia (Mexico) 0–0 (Uruguay) Nacional
    - Standings (after 2 matches): Banfield 6 points, Nacional 4, Morelia 1, Deportivo Cuenca 0.
  - Group 7: Deportivo Italia (Venezuela) 0–1 (Argentina) Vélez Sarsfield
    - Standings: Vélez Sársfield 6 points (2 matches), Colo-Colo 3 (1), Cruzeiro 0 (1), Deportivo Italia 0 (2)

==== Olympic Games ====
- Winter Olympics in Vancouver, Canada:
  - Alpine skiing – Men's giant slalom: (gold) Carlo Janka (SUI) 2:37.83 (silver) Kjetil Jansrud (NOR) +0.39 (bronze) Aksel Lund Svindal (NOR) +0.61
  - Biathlon – Women's relay: (gold) Svetlana Sleptsova/Anna Bogaliy-Titovets/Olga Medvedtseva/Olga Zaitseva (RUS) 1:09:36.3 (5 penalties) (silver) Marie-Laure Brunet/Sylvie Becaert/Marie Dorin/Sandrine Bailly (FRA) +32.8 (10) (bronze) Kati Wilhelm/Simone Hauswald/Martina Beck/Andrea Henkel (NED) +37.1 (5)
    - Wilhelm wins the seventh medal of her career.
    - Beck and Henkel both win the fourth medal of their career.
  - Freestyle skiing – Women's ski cross: (gold) Ashleigh McIvor (CAN) (silver) Hedda Berntsen (NOR) (bronze) Marion Josserand (FRA)
  - Nordic combined – Team large hill/4 x 5 km: (gold) Mario Stecher/David Kreiner/Bernhard Gruber/Felix Gottwald (AUT) 49:31.6 (silver) Brett Camerota/Todd Lodwick/Bill Demong/Johnny Spillane (USA) +5.2 (bronze) Tino Edelmann/Johannes Rydzek/Björn Kircheisen/Eric Frenzel (GER) +19.5
    - Gottwald wins the third title and seventh medal of his career.
  - Speed skating – Men's 10000 metres: (gold) Lee Seung-hoon (KOR) 12:58.55 OR (silver) Ivan Skobrev (RUS) +3.52 (bronze) Bob de Jong (NED) +8.18
  - Figure skating – Women's short program: (1) Kim Yuna (KOR) 78.50 WR (2) Mao Asada (JPN) 73.78 (3) Joannie Rochette (CAN) 71.36
    - Kim sets a world record for the short program, improving her previous mark of 76.28.
  - Bobsleigh – Two-woman:
    - Standings after 2 runs: (1) Kaillie Humphries/Heather Moyse (CAN) 1:46.20 (2) Helen Upperton/Shelley-Ann Brown (USA) +0.13 (3) Cathleen Martini/Romy Logsch (GER) +0.40
  - Ice hockey – Men:
    - Qualification playoffs:
      - Switzerland 3–2 (SO) Belarus
      - Canada 8–2 Germany
      - Czech Republic 3–2 (OT) Latvia
      - Slovakia 4–3 Norway
  - Curling – Men: (teams in **bold** advance to the semifinals, teams in italics secure tie-breakers)
    - Draw 12:
      - China (Wang) 3–10 **Canada** (Martin)
      - Sweden (Edin) 7–6 Denmark (Schmidt)
      - Great Britain (Murdoch) 5–9 **Norway** (Ulsrud)
      - **Switzerland** (Stöckli) 6–2 France (Dufour)
        - Final standings: Canada 9–0, Norway 7–2, Switzerland 6–3, Great Britain, Sweden 5–4, Germany 4–5, France 3–6, China, Denmark, United States 2–7.
  - Curling – Women: (teams in **bold** advance to the semifinals)
    - Draw 11:
      - Japan (Meguro) 6–10 **Sweden** (Norberg)
      - **Switzerland** (Ott) 4–2 Germany (Schöpp)
      - United States (McCormick) 5–6 **China** (Wang)
      - **Canada** (Bernard) 6–5 Great Britain (Muirhead)
    - Draw 12:
      - **Switzerland** (Ott) 10–3 United States (McCormick)
      - **Canada** (Bernard) 7–3 Russia (Privivkova)
      - Japan (Meguro) 4–7 Denmark (Jensen)
      - **Sweden** (Norberg) 8–7 Germany (Schöpp)
        - Final standings: Canada 8–1, Sweden 7–2, China, Switzerland 6–3, Denmark 4–5, Germany, Japan, Russia, Great Britain 3–6, United States 2–7.

=== February 22, 2010 (Monday) ===
==== Cricket ====
- ICC Intercontinental Cup, day 3:
  - Canada 566 (151.5 overs) and 191/4d (40.0 overs); Afghanistan 264 (79.0 overs) and 40/0 (13.0 overs) in Sharjah, United Arab Emirates. Afghanistan require another 454 runs with 10 wickets remaining.
  - Netherlands 385 (105.1 overs) and 178/0 (53.0 overs); Kenya 433 (110.0 overs) in Nairobi. Netherlands lead by 130 runs with 10 wickets remaining in the 2nd innings.

==== Olympic Games ====
- Winter Olympics in Vancouver, Canada:
  - Cross-country skiing – Men's team sprint: (gold) Øystein Pettersen/Petter Northug (NOR) 19:01.0 (silver) Tim Tscharnke/Axel Teichmann (GER) +1.3 (bronze) Nikolay Morilov/Alexey Petukhov (RUS) +1.5
  - Cross-country skiing – Women's team sprint: (gold) Evi Sachenbacher-Stehle/Claudia Nystad (GER) 18:03.7 (silver) Charlotte Kalla/Anna Haag (SWE) +0.6 (bronze) Irina Khazova/Natalya Korostelyova (RUS) +4.0
  - Figure skating – Ice dancing: (gold) Tessa Virtue/Scott Moir (CAN) 221.57 points (silver) Meryl Davis/Charlie White (USA) 215.74 (bronze) Oksana Domnina/Maxim Shabalin (RUS) 207.64
    - Virtue/Moir are the first non-European dance couple to win the Olympic title, and also the youngest ever champions in this event.
  - Ski jumping – Large hill team: (gold) Wolfgang Loitzl/Andreas Kofler/Thomas Morgenstern/Gregor Schlierenzauer (AUT) 1107.9 (silver) Michael Neumayer/Andreas Wank/Martin Schmitt/Michael Uhrmann (GER) 1035.8 (bronze) Anders Bardal/Tom Hilde/Johan Remen Evensen/Anders Jacobsen (NOR) 1030.3
    - Schlierenzauer wins his third medal of the Games.
    - Morgenstern wins the third title of his career.
    - Kofler wins the second title and third medal of his career.
  - Ice hockey – Women:
    - Seventh place game:
      - China 3–1 Slovakia
    - Fifth place game:
      - Switzerland 2–1 (SO) Russia
    - Semifinals:
      - Sweden 1–9 United States
      - Finland 0–5 Canada
  - Curling – Men: (teams in **bold** advance to the semifinals, teams in italics secure at least tie-breakers, teams in ~~strike~~ are eliminated from semifinal contention)
    - Draw 10:
      - ~~France~~ (Dufour) 2–9 **Norway** (Ulsrud)
      - **Canada** (Martin) 7–2 ~~United States~~ (Shuster)
      - Germany (Kapp) 7–6 ~~China~~ (Wang)
      - Switzerland (Stöckli) 7–3 Sweden (Edin)
    - Draw 11:
      - ~~Germany~~ (Kapp) 2–8 Great Britain (Murdoch)
      - ~~France~~ (Dufour) 6–5 ~~Denmark~~ (Schmidt)
      - ~~China~~ (Wang) 11–5 ~~United States~~ (Shuster)
        - Standings (after draw 11): Canada 8–0, Norway 6–2, Switzerland, Great Britain 5–3, Sweden 4–4, Germany 4–5, France 3–5, Denmark, China 2–6, United States 2–7.
  - Curling – Women:
    - Draw 10: (teams in **bold** advance to the semifinals, teams in italics secure at least tie-breakers, teams in ~~strike~~ are eliminated from semifinal contention)
      - Russia (Privivkova) 7–4 China (Wang)
      - Japan (Meguro) 4–10 Switzerland (Ott)
      - Sweden (Norberg) 2–6 **Canada** (Bernard)
      - Great Britain (Muirhead) 8–9 Denmark (Jensen)
        - Standings (after draw 10): Canada 6–1, Sweden 5–2, China 5–3, Switzerland 4–3, Japan, Germany 3–4, Russia, Great Britain, Denmark 3–5, United States 2–5.

=== February 21, 2010 (Sunday) ===
==== Auto racing ====
- NASCAR Sprint Cup Series:
  - Auto Club 500 in Fontana, California:
    - (1) (California) Jimmie Johnson (Chevrolet, Hendrick Motorsports) (2) (California) Kevin Harvick (Chevrolet, Richard Childress Racing) (3) (Virginia) Jeff Burton (Chevrolet, Richard Childress Racing)
      - Drivers' standings (after 2 of 36 races): (1) Harvick 331 points (2) (Kansas) Clint Bowyer (Chevrolet, Richard Childress Racing) 312 (3) (Washington (state)) Greg Biffle (Ford, Roush Fenway Racing) 304

==== Basketball ====
- ASEAN Basketball League Finals:
  - Philippine Patriots (Philippines) 75–67 (Indonesia) Satria Muda BritAma, **Patriots win series 3–0**.
- (Spain) Spanish Cup Final in Bilbao:
  - **FC Barcelona** 80–61 Real Madrid
    - Barcelona win the Cup for the 21st time.
- (Italy) Italian Cup Final in Casalecchio:
  - **Montepaschi Siena** 83–75 Virtus Bologna
    - Siena win the Cup for the second straight time and second time overall.
- (Turkey) Turkish Cup Final:
  - Mersin 68–72 **Fenerbahçe Ülker**
    - Fenerbahçe Ülker win the Cup for the second time.
- (Serbia) Serbian Cup Final:
  - **Partizan** 72–62 FMP
    - Partizan win the Cup for the third straight time and 11th time overall.
- (France) Semaine des As Cup Final:
  - **ASVEL Villeurbanne** 70–69 Orléans
    - ASVEL win the trophy for the first time.
- (Poland) Polish Cup Final:
  - Turów Zgorzelec 75–80 **AZS Koszalin**

==== Cricket ====
- South Africa In India:
  - 1st ODI in Jaipur
    - India 298/9 (50.0 overs); South Africa 297 (50.0 overs). **India win by 1 run, lead the 3-match series 1–0.**
- West Indies in Australia:
  - 1st T20I in Hobart
    - Australia 179/8 (20.0 overs); West Indies 141/8 (20.0 overs). **Australia win by 38 runs, lead the 2-match series 1–0.**
- ICC Intercontinental Cup, day 2:
  - Canada 566 (151.5 overs, S Dhaniram 130); Afghanistan 110/3 (40.0 overs) in Sharjah, United Arab Emirates. Afghanistan trail by 456 runs with 7 wickets remaining in the 1st innings.
  - Netherlands 385 (105.1 overs, RN ten Doeschate 212*); Kenya 235/2 (56.0 overs, DO Obuya 115*) in Nairobi. Kenya trail by 150 runs with 8 wickets remaining in the 1st innings.

==== Golf ====
- World Golf Championships:
  - WGC-Accenture Match Play Championship in Marana, Arizona, United States:
    - Final: Ian Poulter (ENG) def. Paul Casey (ENG) 4 & 2
      - Poulter collects his first WGC title, which is also his first on the PGA Tour and ninth on the European Tour.
    - Consolation Match: Camilo Villegas (COL) def. Sergio García (ESP) 5 & 4
- PGA Tour:
  - Mayakoba Golf Classic at Riviera Maya in Cancún, Mexico:
    - Winner: Cameron Beckman (USA) 269 (−15)
      - Beckman wins his third PGA Tour title.
- LPGA Tour:
  - Honda PTT LPGA Thailand in Chonburi, Thailand:
    - Winner: Ai Miyazato (JPN) 267 (−21)
      - Miyazato wins her second LPGA Tour title.
- Champions Tour:
  - Allianz Championship in Boca Raton, Florida:
    - Winner: Bernhard Langer (GER) 199 (−17)
      - Langer wins his ninth Champions Tour title.

==== Mixed martial arts ====
- UFC 110 in Sydney, Australia:
  - Preliminary Card:
    - Light Heavyweight Bout: James Te-Huna (NZL) def. Igor Pokrajac (CRO) via TKO (strikes) in round 3
    - Middleweight Bout: C.B. Dollaway (USA) def. Goran Reljic (CRO) via unanimous decision (29–28, 29–28, 29–28)
    - Welterweight Bout: Chris Lytle (USA) def. Brian Foster (USA) via submission (kneebar) at 1:41 of round 1
    - Light Heavyweight Bout: Krzysztof Soszynski (POL) def. Stephan Bonnar (USA) via TKO (cut) at 1:04 of round 3
  - Main Card:
    - Heavyweight Bout: Mirko Filipović (CRO) def. Anthony Perosh (AUS) via TKO (doctor stoppage) at 5:00 of round 2
    - Light Heavyweight Bout: Ryan Bader (USA) def. Keith Jardine (USA) via KO (punch) at 2:10 of round 3
    - Lightweight Bout: George Sotiropoulos (AUS) def. Joe Stevenson (USA) via unanimous decision (30–27, 30–27, 30–27)
    - Middleweight Bout: Wanderlei Silva (BRA) def. Michael Bisping (ENG) via unanimous decision (29–28, 29–28, 29–28)
    - Heavyweight Bout: Cain Velasquez (USA) def. Antônio Rodrigo Nogueira (BRA) via KO (punches) at 2:20 of round 1

==== Olympic Games ====
- Winter Olympics in Vancouver, Canada:
  - Alpine skiing – Men's combined: (gold) Bode Miller (USA) 2:44.92 (silver) Ivica Kostelić (CRO) +0.33 (bronze) Silvan Zurbriggen (SUI) +0.40
    - Miller wins his third medal of the Games and the fifth of his career.
  - Biathlon – Men's mass start: (gold) Evgeny Ustyugov (RUS) 35:35.7 (0 penalties) (silver) Martin Fourcade (FRA) +10.5 (3) (bronze) Pavol Hurajt (SVK) +16.6 (0)
  - Biathlon – Women's mass start: (gold) Magdalena Neuner (GER) 35:19.6 (2 penalties) (silver) Olga Zaitseva (RUS) +5.5 (1) (bronze) Simone Hauswald (GER) +7.3 (2)
    - Neuner wins her second title and third medal of the Games.
  - Bobsleigh – Two-man: (gold) André Lange/Kevin Kuske (GER) 3:26.65 (silver) Andre Florschütz/Richard Adjei (GER) +0.22 (bronze) Alexandr Zubkov/Alexey Voyevoda (RUS) +0.86
    - Lange and Kuske win their fourth Olympic titles – two each in two-man and four-man.
  - Freestyle skiing – Men's ski cross: (gold) Michael Schmid (SUI) (silver) Andreas Matt (AUT) (bronze) Audun Grønvold (NOR)
    - Ski cross is a new event on the Olympic program.
  - Speed skating – Women's 1500 metres: (gold) Ireen Wüst (NED) 1:56.89 (silver) Kristina Groves (CAN) +0.25 (bronze) Martina Sáblíková (CZE) +1.07
  - Figure skating – Ice dancing:
    - Standings after Original Dance: (1) Tessa Virtue/Scott Moir (CAN) 111.15 points (2) Meryl Davis/Charlie White (USA) 108.55 (3) Oksana Domnina/Maxim Shabalin (RUS) 106.60
  - Ice hockey – Men: (teams in **bold** advance to the quarter-finals)
    - Group A:
      - Canada 3–5 **United States**
        - Final standings: United States 9 points, Canada 5, Switzerland 3, Norway 1.
    - Group B:
      - **Russia** 4–2 Czech Republic
        - Final standings: Russia 7 points, Czech Republic 6, Slovakia 5, Latvia 0.
    - Group C:
      - **Sweden** 3–0 **Finland**
        - Final standings: Sweden 9 points, Finland 6, Belarus 3, Germany 0.
    - Preliminary standings: 1. United States 2. Sweden 3. Russia 4. Finland 5. Czech Republic 6. Canada 7. Slovakia 8. Switzerland 9. Belarus 10. Norway 11. Germany 12. Latvia
  - Curling – Men:
    - Draw 9: (teams in **bold** advance to the semifinals)
      - United States (Shuster) 2–4 Great Britain (Murdoch)
      - Norway (Ulsrud) 7–8 Sweden (Edin)
      - Switzerland (Stöckli) 4–6 **Canada** (Martin)
      - Denmark (Schmidt) 9–5 Germany (Kapp)
        - Standings (after draw 9): Canada 7–0, Norway 5–2, Switzerland, Great Britain, Sweden 4–3, Germany 3–4, France 2–4, United States, Denmark 2–5, China 1–5.
  - Curling – Women:
    - Draw 8:
      - Great Britain (Muirhead) 6–10 Switzerland (Ott)
      - Germany (Schöpp) 5–6 Denmark (Jensen)
      - Canada (Bernard) 9–2 United States (McCormick)
      - Russia (Privivkova) 9–12 Japan (Meguro)
    - Draw 9:
      - China (Wang) 6–5 Canada (Bernard)
      - Japan (Meguro) 6–7 Germany (Schöpp)
      - United States (McCormick) 3–9 Sweden (Norberg)
        - Standings (after draw 9): Canada, Sweden 5–1, China 5–2, Japan, Switzerland 3–3, Great Britain, Germany 3–4, Denmark, Russia, United States 2–5.

==== Tennis ====
- ATP World Tour:
  - Regions Morgan Keegan Championships in Memphis, United States:
    - Final: **Sam Querrey** (USA) def. John Isner (USA) 6–7(3), 7–6(5), 6–3
      - Querrey wins the third title of his career.
  - Open 13 in Marseille, France:
    - Final: **Michaël Llodra** (FRA) def. Julien Benneteau (FRA) 6–3, 6–4
      - Llodra wins the fourth title of his career.
  - Copa Telmex in Buenos Aires, Argentina:
    - Final: **Juan Carlos Ferrero** (ESP) def. David Ferrer (ESP) 5–6, 6–4, 6–3
      - Ferrero wins the 14th title of his career.
- WTA Tour:
  - Copa Sony Ericsson Colsanitas in Bogotá, Colombia:
    - **Mariana Duque Mariño** (COL) def. Angelique Kerber (GER) 6–4, 6–3
      - Duque Marino wins her first career title.

=== February 20, 2010 (Saturday) ===
==== Auto racing ====
- Nationwide Series:
  - Stater Bros 300 in Fontana, California:
    - (1) (Nevada) Kyle Busch (Toyota, Joe Gibbs Racing) (2) (Washington (state)) Greg Biffle (Ford, Baker-Curb Racing) (3) (Michigan) Brad Keselowski (Dodge, Penske Racing)
      - Drivers' standings (after 2 of 35 races): (1) (Missouri) Carl Edwards (Ford, Roush Fenway Racing) 335 points (2) (Connecticut) Joey Logano (Toyota, Joe Gibbs Racing) 311 (3) Busch 304
- V8 Supercars:
  - Yas V8 400 in Abu Dhabi, United Arab Emirates:
    - Race 2: (1) Jamie Whincup (AUS) (Holden Commodore) (2) Mark Winterbottom (AUS) (Ford Falcon) (3) Shane van Gisbergen (NZL) (Ford Falcon)
      - Drivers' standings (after 2 of 26 races): (1) Whincup 300 points (2) Winterbottom 267 (3) Craig Lowndes (AUS) (Holden Commodore) 249

=== Basketball ===
- (Greece) Greek Cup Final in Ellinikon, Athens:
  - **Olympiacos** 68–64 Panathinaikos
    - Olympiacos, runner-up to arch rival Panathinaikos in previous two finals, win the Cup for the eighth time.

==== Cricket ====
- England v Pakistan in UAE:
  - 2nd T20I in Dubai
  - England 148/6 (20.0 overs); Pakistan 149/6 (19.0 overs). **Pakistan win by 4 wickets. 2-match series drawn 1–1.**
- ICC Intercontinental Cup, day 1:
  - Canada 350/6 (98.0 overs); Afghanistan in Sharjah, United Arab Emirates
  - Netherlands 276/6 (74.0 overs, RN ten Doeschate 129*); Kenya in Nairobi.

==== Football (soccer) ====
- OFC Champions League Group stage, Matchday 4:
  - Group A: Waitakere United (New Zealand) 4–1 (New Caledonia) AS Magenta
    - Standings (after 4 matches): Auckland City FC 10 points, Waitakere United 8, AS Magenta 2, AS Manu-Ura 1.

==== Handball ====
- African Men's Championship in Egypt: (teams in **bold** qualify for 2011 World Championship)
  - Bronze medal match: Congo DR 22–30 (bronze) **Algeria**
  - Gold medal match: (gold) **Tunisia** 24–21 (silver) **Egypt**
    - Tunisia win the title for the eighth time.
- African Women's Championship in Egypt: (teams in **bold** qualify for 2011 World Championship)
  - Bronze medal match: (bronze) **Ivory Coast** 32–28 Algeria
  - Gold medal match: (gold) **Angola** 31–30 (silver) **Tunisia**
    - Angola win the title for the seventh straight time and the tenth time overall.

==== Olympic Games ====
- Winter Olympics in Vancouver, Canada:
  - Alpine skiing – Women's super-G: (gold) Andrea Fischbacher (AUT) 1:20.14 (silver) Tina Maze (SLO) +0.49 (bronze) Lindsey Vonn (USA) +0.74
  - Cross-country skiing – Men's 30 kilometre pursuit: (gold) Marcus Hellner (SWE) 1:15:11.4 (silver) Tobias Angerer (GER) +2.1 (bronze) Johan Olsson (SWE) +2.8
    - Angerer wins the fourth medal of his career.
  - Short track speed skating – Women's 1500 metres: (gold) Zhou Yang (CHN) 2:16.993 OR (silver) Lee Eun-byul (KOR) +0.856 (bronze) Park Seung-hi (KOR) +0.934
  - Short track speed skating – Men's 1000 metres: (gold) Lee Jung-su (KOR) 1:23.747 OR (silver) Lee Ho-suk (KOR) +0.054 (bronze) Apolo Ohno (USA) +0.381
    - Lee Jung-su wins his second title of the Games.
    - Ohno wins his seventh Olympic medal and becomes the most decorated American in Winter Olympics.
  - Ski jumping – Large hill individual: (gold) Simon Ammann (SUI) 283.6 points (silver) Adam Małysz (POL) 269.4 (bronze) Gregor Schlierenzauer (AUT) 262.2
    - Ammann wins his second title of the Games and becomes the first ski jumper in history to win four individual Olympic gold medals.
    - Małysz wins the fourth medal of his career.
  - Speed skating – Men's 1500 metres: (gold) Mark Tuitert (NED) 1:45.57 (silver) Shani Davis (USA) +0.13 (bronze) Håvard Bøkko (NOR) +0.22
    - Davis wins the fourth medal of his career.
  - Bobsleigh – Two-man:
    - Standings after 2 runs: (1) André Lange/Kevin Kuske (GER) 1:43.31 (2) Andre Florschütz/Richard Adjei (GER) +0.11 (3) Alexandr Zubkov/Alexey Voyevoda (RUS) +0.50
  - Ice hockey – Men:
    - Group A:
      - Norway 4–5 (OT) Switzerland
        - Standings: United States 6 points (2 games), Canada 5 (2), Switzerland 3 (3), Norway 1 (3).
    - Group B:
      - Latvia 0–6 Slovakia
        - Standings: Czech Republic 6 points (3 games), Slovakia 5 (3), Russia 4 (2), Latvia 0 (3).
    - Group C:
      - Germany 3–5 Belarus
        - Standings: Sweden, Finland 6 points (2 matches), Belarus 3 (3), Germany 0 (3).
  - Ice hockey – Women:
    - Fifth place semifinals:
      - Switzerland 6–0 China
      - Russia 4–2 Slovakia
  - Curling – Men:
    - Draw 7:
      - Norway (Ulsrud) 6–3 Denmark (Schmidt)
      - France (Dufour) 4–9 Germany (Kapp)
      - China (Wang) 4–9 Great Britain (Murdoch)
      - Sweden (Edin) 7–8 United States (Shuster)
    - Draw 8:
      - Switzerland (Stöckli) 9–5 China (Wang)
      - Sweden (Edin) 4–5 France (Dufour)
      - Canada (Martin) 7–6 Great Britain (Murdoch)
        - Standings (after draw 8): Canada 6–0, Norway 5–1, Switzerland 4–2, Great Britain, Germany, Sweden 3–3, France, United States 2–4, China, Denmark 1–5.
  - Curling – Women:
    - Draw 7:
      - Sweden (Norberg) 1–10 Russia (Privivkova)
      - United States (McCormick) 6–5 Great Britain (Muirhead)
      - Denmark (Jensen) 7–8 Switzerland (Ott)
      - Germany (Schöpp) 7–9 China (Wang)
        - Standings (after draw 7): Canada 4–0, Sweden 4–1, China 4–2, Great Britain 3–3, Japan 2–2, Germany, United States, Switzerland 2–3, Russia 2–4, Denmark 1–5.

==== Tennis ====
- WTA Tour:
  - Dubai Tennis Championships in Dubai, United Arab Emirates:
    - Final: **Venus Williams** (USA) def. Victoria Azarenka (BLR) 6–3, 7–5
      - Williams wins the 42nd title of her career, and her second consecutive title at the event.
  - Cellular South Cup in Memphis, United States:
    - Final: **Maria Sharapova** (RUS) def. Sofia Arvidsson (SWE) 6–2, 6–1
      - Sharapova wins the 20th title of her career.

=== February 19, 2010 (Friday) ===
==== Auto racing ====
- V8 Supercars:
  - Yas V8 400 in Abu Dhabi, United Arab Emirates:
    - Race 1: (1) Jamie Whincup (AUS) (Holden Commodore) (2) Craig Lowndes (AUS) (Holden Commodore) (3) Mark Winterbottom (AUS) (Ford Falcon)
      - Drivers' standings (after 1 of 26 races): (1) Whincup 150 points (2) Lowndes 138 (3) Winterbottom 129

==== Cricket ====
- Bangladesh in New Zealand:
  - Only Test in Hamilton, day 5:
    - New Zealand 553/7d (135 overs) and 258/5d (71.0 overs); Bangladesh 408 (97.3 overs) and 282 (76.0 overs, Shakib Al Hasan 100). **New Zealand win by 121 runs, win the 1-match series 1–0.**
- West Indies in Australia:
  - 5th ODI in Melbourne
    - Australia 324/5 (50.0 overs); West Indies 199 (36.5 overs). **Australia win by 125 runs, win the 5-match series 4–0.**
- England v Pakistan in UAE:
  - 1st T20I in Dubai
    - Pakistan 129/8 (20 overs); England 130/3 (18.3 overs). **England win by 7 wickets, lead the 2-match series 1–0.**

==== Handball ====
- Asian Men's Championship in Beirut, Lebanon: (teams in **bold** qualify for 2011 World Championship)
  - Bronze medal match: Saudi Arabia 30–33 (OT) (bronze) **Japan**
  - Gold medal match: (silver) **Bahrain** 25–32 (gold) **South Korea**
    - South Korea win the title for the second straight time and the eighth time overall.
- African Men's Championship in Egypt:
  - Semifinals: (the winners qualify for 2011 World Championship)
    - Tunisia 37–22 Congo DR
    - Egypt 26–24 Algeria

==== Olympic Games ====
- Winter Olympics in Vancouver, Canada:
  - Alpine skiing – Men's super-G: (gold) Aksel Lund Svindal (NOR) 1:30.34 (silver) Bode Miller (USA) +0.28 (bronze) Andrew Weibrecht (USA) +0.31
  - Cross-country – Women's 15 kilometre pursuit: (gold) Marit Bjørgen (NOR) 39:58.1 (silver) Anna Haag (SWE) +8.9 (bronze) Justyna Kowalczyk (POL) +9.3
    - Bjørgen wins her second Olympic title and the third medal of these Games.
  - Skeleton – Men: (gold) Jon Montgomery (CAN) 3:29.73 (silver) Martins Dukurs (LAT) +0.07 (bronze) Aleksandr Tretyakov (RUS) +1.02
  - Skeleton – Women: (gold) Amy Williams (GBR) 3:35.64 (silver) Kerstin Szymkowiak (GER) +0.56 (bronze) Anja Huber (GER) +0.72
  - Figure skating – Ice dancing:
    - Standings after Compulsory Dance: (1) Oksana Domnina/Maxim Shabalin (RUS) 43.76 (2) Tessa Virtue/Scott Moir (CAN) (3) Meryl Davis/Charlie White (USA) 41.47
  - Ice hockey – Men:
    - Group B:
      - Czech Republic 5–2 Latvia
        - Standings: Czech Republic 6 points, Russia 4, Slovakia 2, Latvia 0.
    - Group C:
      - Belarus 2–4 Sweden
      - Finland 5–0 Germany
        - Standings: Sweden, Finland 6 points, Germany, Belarus 0.
  - Curling – Men:
    - Draw 6:
      - Germany 7–6 Switzerland
      - Denmark 3–10 Canada
      - France 3–4 United States
      - Norway 7–5 China
        - Standings (after draw 6): Canada 5–0, Norway 4–1, Sweden 3–1, Switzerland 3–2, Great Britain 2–2, Germany 2–3, France, China 1–3, Denmark, United States 1–4.
  - Curling – Women:
    - Draw 5:
      - Germany 4–7 Great Britain
      - Russia 4–6 United States
      - China 11–1 Denmark
    - Draw 6:
      - Denmark 4–5 Canada
      - Sweden 6–4 China
      - Great Britain 4–11 Japan
      - Switzerland 8–5 Russia
        - Standings (after draw 6): Canada, Sweden 4–0, China, Great Britain 3–2, Germany, Japan 2–2, United States, Switzerland 1–3, Russia, Denmark 1–4.

=== February 18, 2010 (Thursday) ===
==== Basketball ====
- (Israel) State Cup Final in Tel Aviv:
  - **Maccabi Tel Aviv** 77–70 Bnei HaSharon
    - Maccabi Tel Aviv win the Cup for the first time in four years and the 37th time overall.

==== Cricket ====
- South Africa In India:
  - 2nd Test in Kolkata, day 5:
    - South Africa 296 (85 overs) and 289 (131.3 overs, Hashim Amla 127*); India 643/6d (153 overs). **India win by an innings and 58 runs. 2-match series drawn 1–1**.
- Bangladesh in New Zealand:
  - Only Test in Hamilton, day 4:
    - New Zealand 553/7d (135 overs) and 258/5d (71.0 overs); Bangladesh 408 (97.3 overs) and 88/5 (30.0 overs). Bangladesh require another 316 runs with 5 wickets remaining.
- Netherlands in Kenya:
  - 2nd ODI in Nairobi:
    - Netherlands 200 (48.4 overs); Kenya 120 (32.0 overs). **Netherlands win by 80 runs. 2-match series drawn 1–1**.
- Canada vs Afghanistan in UAE:
  - 2nd ODI in Sharjah:
    - Afghanistan 177 (43.1 overs); Canada 178/6 (39.2 overs). **Canada win by 4 wickets. 2-match series drawn 1–1**.

==== Darts ====
- Premier League round 2 in Bournemouth, England:
  - Adrian Lewis (ENG) 8–3 Raymond van Barneveld (NED)
  - Terry Jenkins (ENG) 7–7 Simon Whitlock (AUS)
  - Phil Taylor (ENG) 8–6 Ronnie Baxter (ENG)
  - James Wade (ENG) 4–8 Mervyn King (ENG)
    - High Checkout: Adrian Lewis 121
      - Standings: Taylor, King 4 points, Lewis, Jenkins, van Barneveld 2, Baxter, Whitlock 1, Wade 0.

==== Football (soccer) ====
- UEFA Europa League Round of 32, first leg:
  - Rubin Kazan (Russia) 3–0 (Israel) Hapoel Tel Aviv
  - Ajax (Netherlands) 1–2 (Italy) Juventus
  - Club Brugge (Belgium) 1–0 (Spain) Valencia
  - Twente (Netherlands) 1–0 (Germany) Werder Bremen
  - Lille (France) 2–1 (Turkey) Fenerbahçe
  - Standard Liège (Belgium) 3–2 (Austria) Red Bull Salzburg
  - Villarreal (Spain) 2–2 (Germany) Wolfsburg
  - Athletic Bilbao (Spain) 1–1 (Belgium) Anderlecht
  - Atlético Madrid (Spain) 1–1 (Turkey) Galatasaray
  - Copenhagen (Denmark) 1–3 (France) Marseille
  - Fulham (England) 2–1 (Ukraine) Shakhtar Donetsk
  - Hamburg (Germany) 1–0 (Netherlands) PSV Eindhoven
  - Hertha BSC (Germany) 1–1 (Portugal) Benfica
  - Liverpool (England) 1–0 (Romania) Unirea Urziceni
  - Panathinaikos (Greece) 3–2 (Italy) Roma
- Copa Libertadores second stage:
  - Group 3: Alianza Lima (Peru) 4–1 (Argentina) Estudiantes
    - Standings: Alianza Lima 6 points (2 matches), Estudiantes 3 (2), Bolívar, Juan Aurich 0 (1).
  - Group 8: Universidad de Chile 1–0 (Venezuela) Caracas
    - Standings: Universidad de Chile 3 points (1 match), Flamengo, Universidad Católica 0 (0), Caracas 0 (1)

==== Handball ====
- African Women's Championship in Egypt:
  - Semifinals: (the winners qualify for 2011 World Championship)
    - Ivory Coast 24–27 Angola
    - Algeria 16–36 Tunisia

==== Olympic Games ====
- Winter Olympics in Vancouver, Canada:
  - Alpine skiing – Women's combined: (gold) Maria Riesch (GER) 2:09.14 (silver) Julia Mancuso (USA) +0.94 (bronze) Anja Pärson (SWE) +1.05
    - Pärson wins the sixth medal of her career.
  - Biathlon – Women's individual: (gold) Tora Berger (NOR) 40:52.8 (1 shot missed) (silver) Elena Khrustaleva (KAZ) +20.7 (0) (bronze) Darya Domracheva (BLR) +28.2 (1)
    - Berger wins the 100th gold medal for Norway in Winter Olympics history.
  - Biathlon – Men's individual: (gold) Emil Hegle Svendsen (NOR) 48:22.5 (1 shot missed) (silver) Ole Einar Bjørndalen (NOR) +9.5 (2) (silver) Sergei Novikov (BLR) +9.5 (0)
    - Bjørndalen wins the tenth medal of his career.
  - Figure skating – Men: (gold) Evan Lysacek (USA) 257.67 (silver) Evgeni Plushenko (RUS) 256.36 (bronze) Daisuke Takahashi (JPN) 247.23
    - Lysacek wins the first gold medal for USA in the men's event since Brian Boitano in 1988, which was also the last time a Russian or Soviet skater didn't win the title.
    - Takahashi becomes the first Japanese medallist in men's figure skating.
  - Snowboarding – Women's halfpipe: (gold) Torah Bright (AUS) 45.0 (silver) Hannah Teter (USA) 42.4 (bronze) Kelly Clark (USA) 42.2
  - Speed skating – Women's 1000 metres: (gold) Christine Nesbitt (CAN) 1:16.56 (silver) Annette Gerritsen (NED) +0.02 (bronze) Laurine van Riessen (NED) +0.16
  - Skeleton – Men:
    - Standings after 2 runs: (1) Martins Dukurs (LAT) 1:44.91 (2) Jon Montgomery (CAN) +0.26 (3) Aleksandr Tretyakov (RUS) +0.84
  - Skeleton – Women:
    - Standings after 2 runs: (1) Amy Williams (GBR) 1:47.96 (2) Kerstin Szymkowiak (GER) +0.30 (3) Mellisa Hollingsworth (CAN) +0.39
  - Ice hockey – Men:
    - Group A:
      - United States 6–1 Norway
      - Switzerland 2–3 (SO) Canada
        - Standings (after 2 games): United States 6 points, Canada 5, Switzerland 1, Norway 0.
    - Group B:
      - Slovakia 2–1 (SO) Russia
        - Standings: Russia 4 points (2 games), Czech Republic 3 (1), Slovakia 2 (2), Latvia 0 (1).
  - Ice hockey – Women:
    - Group B: (teams in **bold** advance to the semifinals)
      - **United States** 6–0 **Finland**
      - China 1–2 Russia
        - Final standings: USA 9 points, Finland 6 points, Russia 3, China 0.
  - Curling – Men:
    - Draw 4:
      - Denmark (Schmidt) 7–6 United States (Shuster)
      - Germany (Kapp) 4–7 Norway (Ulsrud)
      - Canada (Martin) 7–3 Sweden (Edin)
      - Great Britain (Murdoch) 3–4 Switzerland (Stöckli)
    - Draw 5:
      - Sweden (Edin) 6–5 China (Wang)
      - Great Britain (Murdoch) 9–4 Denmark (Schmidt)
      - Norway (Ulsrud) 7–4 Switzerland (Stöckli)
      - France (Dufour) 5–10 Canada (Martin)
        - Standings (after draw 5): Canada 4–0, Switzerland, Sweden, Norway 3–1, Great Britain 2–2, France, China 1–2, Denmark, Germany 1–3, United States 0–4.
  - Curling – Women:
    - Draw 4:
      - Canada (Bernard) 6–5 Germany (Schöpp)
      - China (Wang) 9–5 Japan (Meguro)
      - Russia (Privivkova) 3–10 Great Britain (Muirhead)
      - Denmark (Jensen) 7–6 United States (McCormick)
        - Standings (after draw 4): Sweden, Canada 3–0, China, Germany, Great Britain 2–1, Japan, Denmark, Russia 1–2, United States, Switzerland 0–3.

==== Snooker ====
- Pro Challenge Series – Event 5 in Liverpool, England:
  - Final: **Barry Hawkins** (ENG) def. Michael Holt (ENG) 5–1

=== February 17, 2010 (Wednesday) ===
==== Cricket ====
- South Africa In India:
  - 2nd Test in Kolkata, day 4:
    - South Africa 296 (85 overs) and 115/3 (35.0 overs); India 643/6d (153 overs). South Africa trail by 232 runs with 7 wickets remaining
- Bangladesh in New Zealand:
  - Only Test in Hamilton, day 3:
    - New Zealand 553/7d (135 overs) and 9/1 (5.0 overs); Bangladesh 408 (97.3 overs, Mahmudullah 115). New Zealand lead by 154 runs with 9 wickets remaining

==== Football (soccer) ====
- UEFA Champions League Round of 16, first leg:
  - Porto (Portugal) 2–1 (England) Arsenal
  - Bayern Munich (Germany) 2–1 (Italy) Fiorentina
- Copa Libertadores second stage:
  - Group 4: Universitario (Peru) 2–0 (Argentina) Lanús
    - Standings (after 2 matches): Libertad, Universitario 6 points, Lanús, Blooming 0.
  - Group 6: Deportivo Cuenca (Ecuador) 1–4 (Argentina) Banfield
    - Standings: Banfield 6 points (2 matches), Nacional 3 (1), Morelia 0 (1), Deportivo Cuenca 0 (2).

==== Handball ====
- Asian Men's Championship in Beirut, Lebanon:
  - Semifinals: (the winners qualify for 2011 World Championship)
    - Saudi Arabia 25–26 Bahrain
    - South Korea 30–23 Japan
- African Men's Championship in Egypt: (teams in **bold** advance to the semifinals.)
  - Group D:
    - **Algeria** 21–21 **Tunisia**
      - Final standings: Tunisia, Algeria 3 points, Angola 0
  - Group E:
    - Morocco 28–30 **Congo DR**
      - Final standings: **Egypt** 4 points, Congo DR 2, Morocco 0

==== Olympic Games ====
- Winter Olympics in Vancouver, Canada:
  - Alpine skiing – Women's downhill: (gold) Lindsey Vonn (USA) 1:44.19 (silver) Julia Mancuso (USA) +0.56 (bronze) Elisabeth Görgl (AUT) +1.46
  - Cross-country skiing – Men's sprint: (gold) Nikita Kriukov (RUS) 3:36.3 (silver) Alexander Panzhinskiy (RUS) +0.0 (bronze) Petter Northug (NOR) +9.2
  - Cross-country skiing – Women's sprint: (gold) Marit Bjørgen (NOR) 3:39.2 (silver) Justyna Kowalczyk (POL) +1.1 (bronze) Petra Majdič (SLO) +1.8
  - Luge – Doubles: (gold) Andreas Linger/Wolfgang Linger (AUT) 1:22.705 (silver) Andris Sics/Juris Sics (LAT) +0.264 (bronze) Patric Leitner/Alexander Resch (GER) +0.335
  - Short track speed skating – Women's 500 metres: (gold) Wang Meng (CHN) 43.048 (silver) Marianne St-Gelais (CAN) +0.659 (bronze) Arianna Fontana (ITA) +0.756
  - Snowboarding – Men's halfpipe: (gold) Shaun White (USA) 48.4 (silver) Peetu Piiroinen (CAN) 45.0 (bronze) Scotty Lago (USA) 42.8
  - Speed skating – Men's 1000 metres: (gold) Shani Davis (USA) 1:08.94 (silver) Mo Tae-bum (KOR) +0.18 (bronze) Chad Hedrick (USA) +0.38
  - Ice hockey – Men:
    - Group B:
      - Czech Republic 3–1 Slovakia
    - Group C:
      - Finland 5–1 Belarus
      - Sweden 2–0 Germany
  - Ice hockey – Women:
    - Group A: (teams in **bold** advance to the semifinals)
      - **Canada** 13–1 **Sweden**
      - Switzerland 2–5 Slovakia
        - Final standings: Canada 9 points, Sweden 6, Switzerland 3, Slovakia 0.
  - Curling – Men:
    - Draw 3:
      - Great Britain (Murdoch) 9–4 France (Dufour)
      - United States (Shuster) 6–7 Switzerland (Stöckli)
      - Denmark (Schmidt) 1–8 China (Wang)
      - Germany (Kapp) 3–6 Sweden (Edin)
        - Standings (after draw 3): Canada, Sweden, Switzerland 2–0, France, Norway, China, Great Britain 1–1, Germany 1–2, Denmark 0–2, United States 0–3.
  - Curling – Women:
    - Draw 2:
      - China (Wang) 4–5 Great Britain (Muirhead)
      - Germany (Schöpp) 6–5 United States (McCormick)
      - Switzerland (Ott) 7–8 Sweden (Norberg)
      - Japan (Meguro) 6–7 Canada (Bernard)
    - Draw 3:
      - Russia (Privivkova) 7–3 Denmark (Jensen)
      - Great Britain (Muirhead) 4–6 Sweden (Norberg)
      - China (Wang) 8–6 Switzerland (Ott)
        - Standings (after draw 3): Sweden 3–0, Canada, Germany 2–0, Japan, China, Russia, Great Britain 1–1, Denmark, United States 0–2, Switzerland 0–3.

=== February 16, 2010 (Tuesday) ===
==== Cricket ====
- South Africa In India:
  - 2nd Test in Kolkata, day 3:
    - South Africa 296 (85 overs) and 6/0 (0.5 overs); India 643/6d (153 overs, V. V. S. Laxman 143, Mahendra Singh Dhoni 132).
- Bangladesh in New Zealand:
  - Only Test in Hamilton, day 2:
    - New Zealand 553/7d (135 overs, Martin Guptill 189, Brendon McCullum 185); Bangladesh 87/1 (17.0 overs)
- Netherlands in Kenya:
  - 1st ODI in Nairobi:
    - Netherlands 219/9 (50 overs, Ryan ten Doeschate 109*); Kenya 221/4 (34.5 overs). **Kenya win by 6 wickets, lead 2-match series 1–0.**
- Canada vs Afghanistan in UAE:
  - 1st ODI in Sharjah:
    - Afghanistan 289/6 (50 overs, Mohammad Shahzad 118); Canada 288/7 (50 overs). **Afghanistan win by 1 run, lead 2-match series 1–0.**

==== Football (soccer) ====
- UEFA Champions League Round of 16, first leg:
  - Lyon (France) 1–0 (Spain) Real Madrid
  - Milan (Italy) 2–3 (England) Manchester United
- UEFA Europa League Round of 32, first leg:
  - Everton (England) 2–1 (Portugal) Sporting CP
- Copa Libertadores second stage:
  - Group 4: Libertad (Paraguay) 4–0 (Bolivia) Blooming
  - Group 7: Colo-Colo (Chile) 1–0 (Venezuela) Deportivo Italia

==== Handball ====
- African Men's Championship in Egypt: (teams in **bold** advance to the semifinals.)
  - Group D:
    - Angola 19–26 **Algeria**
      - Standings: **Tunisia**, **Algeria** 2 points (1 match), Angola 0 (2)
  - Group E:
    - **Egypt** 44–21 Morocco
      - Standings: **Egypt** 4 points (2 matches), Congo DR, Morocco 0 (1)

==== Olympic Games ====
- Winter Olympics in Vancouver, Canada:
  - Alpine skiing – Men's combined: postponed
  - Biathlon – Women's pursuit: (gold) Magdalena Neuner (GER) 30:16.0 (2 penalties) (silver) Anastazia Kuzmina (SVK) +12.3 (2) (bronze) Marie-Laure Brunet (FRA) +28.3 (0)
  - Biathlon – Men's pursuit: (gold) Björn Ferry (SWE) 33:38.4 (1 penalty) (silver) Christoph Sumann (AUT) +16.5 (2) (bronze) Vincent Jay (FRA) +28.2 (2)
  - Luge – Women's singles: (gold) Tatjana Hüfner (GER) 2:46.524 (silver) Nina Reithmayer (AUT) +0.490 (bronze) Natalie Geisenberger (FRA) +0.577
  - Snowboarding – Women's snowboard cross: (gold) Maëlle Ricker (CAN) (silver) Déborah Anthonioz (FRA) (bronze) Olivia Nobs (SUI)
  - Speed skating – Women's 500 metres: (gold) Lee Sang-hwa (KOR) 76.09 (silver) Jenny Wolf (GER) 76.14 (bronze) Wang Beixing (CHN) 76.63
  - Figure skating – Men's short program: (1) Evgeni Plushenko (RUS) 90.85 (2) Evan Lysacek (USA) 90.30 (3) Daisuke Takahashi (JPN) 90.25
  - Ice hockey – Men:
    - Group A:
      - United States 3–1 Switzerland
      - Canada 8–0 Norway
    - Group B:
      - Russia 8–2 Latvia
  - Ice hockey – Women:
    - Group B: (teams in **bold** advance to the semifinals)
      - Russia 0–13 **United States**
      - **Finland** 2–1 China
        - Standings: USA, Finland 6 points, China, Russia 0.
  - Curling – Men:
    - Draw 1:
      - Great Britain (Murdoch) 4–6 Sweden (Edin)
      - Norway (Ulsrud) 6–7 Canada (Martin)
      - United States (Shuster) 5–7 Germany (Kapp)
      - Switzerland (Stöckli) 6–5 Denmark (Schmidt)
    - Draw 2:
      - Canada (Martin) 9–4 Germany (Kapp)
      - China (Wang) 5–6 France (Dufour)
      - United States (Shuster) 5–6 Norway (Ulsrud)
        - Standings: Canada 2–0, Sweden, Switzerland, France 1–0, Norway, Germany 1–1, China, Denmark, Great Britain 0–1, United States 0–2.
  - Curling – Women:
    - Draw 1:
      - United States (McCormick) 7–9 Japan (Meguro)
      - Denmark (Jensen) 5–6 Sweden (Norberg)
      - Germany (Schöpp) 9–5 Russia (Privivkova)
      - Canada (Bernard) 5–4 Switzerland (Ott)

=== February 15, 2010 (Monday) ===
==== Cricket ====
- South Africa In India:
  - 2nd Test in Kolkata, day 2:
    - South Africa 296 (85 overs); India 342/5 (76 overs, Virender Sehwag 165, Sachin Tendulkar 106). India lead by 46 runs with 5 wickets remaining in the 1st innings
- Bangladesh in New Zealand:
  - Only Test in Hamilton, day 1:
    - New Zealand 258/5 (68.1 overs)

==== Handball ====
- Asian Men's Championship in Beirut, Lebanon: (teams in **bold** advance to the semifinals)
  - Group E:
    - Qatar 26–26 **Saudi Arabia**
    - **Japan** 36–23 Iran
      - Final standing: Saudi Arabia 5 points, Japan 4, Qatar 3, Iran 0.
  - Group F:
    - Syria 25–35 **South Korea**
    - Lebanon 18–36 **Bahrain**
      - Final standing: South Korea 6 points, Bahrain 4, Syria 2, Lebanon 0.
- African Men's Championship in Egypt:
  - Group D:
    - Tunisia 33–21 Angola
      - Standings: Tunisia 2 points (1 match), Algeria 0 (0), Angola 0 (1).
  - Group E:
    - Congo DR 17–32 Egypt
      - Standings: Egypt 2 points (1 match), Morocco 0 (0), Congo DR 0 (1).
- African Women's Championship in Egypt:
  - Quarter-final:
    - Cameroon 17–30 Angola
    - Ivory Coast 38–32 Egypt
    - Tunisia 40–23 Congo DR
    - Congo 26–27 Algeria

==== Olympic Games ====
- Winter Olympics in Vancouver, Canada:
  - Alpine skiing – Men's downhill: (gold) Didier Défago (SUI) 1:54.31 (silver) Aksel Lund Svindal (NOR) 1:54.38 (bronze) Bode Miller (USA) 1:54.40
  - Cross-country skiing – Women's 10 kilometre freestyle: (gold) Charlotte Kalla (SWE) 24:58.4 (silver) Kristina Šmigun-Vähi (EST) 25:05.0 (bronze) Marit Bjørgen (NOR) 25:14.3
  - Cross-country skiing – Men's 15 kilometre freestyle: (gold) Dario Cologna (SUI) 33:36.3 (silver) Pietro Piller Cottrer (ITA) 34:00.9 (bronze) Lukáš Bauer (CZE) 34:12.0
  - Figure skating – Pairs: (gold) Shen Xue/Zhao Hongbo (CHN) 216.57 WR (silver) Pang Qing/Tong Jian (CHN) 213.31 (Free Skating 141.81 WR) (bronze) Aliona Savchenko/Robin Szolkowy (GER) 210.60
    - Shen & Zhao win the first Olympic gold medal for China in figure skating, as Russia or USSR fail to win the pairs title for the first time since 1960.
  - Snowboarding – Men's snowboard cross: (gold) Seth Wescott (USA) (silver) Mike Robertson (CAN) (bronze) Tony Ramoin (FRA)
  - Speed skating – Men's 500 metres: (gold) Mo Tae-bum (KOR) 69.82 (silver) Keiichiro Nagashima (JPN) 69.98 (bronze) Joji Kato (JPN) 70.01
  - Ice hockey – Women:
    - Group A: (teams in **bold** advance to the semifinals)
      - Switzerland 1–10 **Canada**
      - **Sweden** 6–2 Slovakia
        - Standings: Canada, Sweden 6 points, Switzerland, Slovakia 0.
  - Luge – Women's singles:
    - Standings after 2 runs: (1) Tatjana Hüfner (GER) 1:23.241 (2) Nina Reithmayer (AUT) 1:23.291 (3) Natalie Geisenberger (GER) 1:23.400

=== February 14, 2010 (Sunday) ===
==== Auto racing ====
- NASCAR Sprint Cup Series:
  - Daytona 500 in Daytona Beach, Florida:
    - (1) Jamie McMurray (Missouri) (Chevrolet, Earnhardt Ganassi Racing) (2) Dale Earnhardt Jr. (North Carolina) (Chevrolet, Hendrick Motorsports) (3) Greg Biffle (Washington (state)) (Ford, Roush Fenway Racing)
- World Rally Championship:
  - Rally Sweden: (gold) Mikko Hirvonen (FIN)/Jarmo Lehtinen (FIN) (Ford Focus RS WRC 09) 3:09:30.4 (silver) Sébastien Loeb (FRA)/Daniel Elena (MON) (Citroën C4 WRC) 3:10:12.7 (bronze) Jari-Matti Latvala (FIN)/Miikka Anttila (FIN) (Ford Focus RS WRC 09) 3:10:45.8

==== Basketball ====
- NBA All-Star Game in Arlington, Texas, United States:
  - East 141, West 139
    - In front of a crowd of 108,713, the largest ever to attend a basketball game, Dwyane Wade is named the game MVP.

==== Cricket ====
- South Africa In India:
  - 2nd Test in Kolkata, day 1:
    - South Africa 266/9 (81.0 overs, Hashim Amla 114, Alviro Petersen 100)
- West Indies in Australia:
  - 4th ODI in Brisbane:
    - Australia 324/7 (50 overs), Ricky Ponting 106; West Indies 274/8 (50 overs). **Australia win by 50 runs, lead 5-match series 3–0.**

==== Football (soccer) ====
- East Asian Men's Football Championship in Tokyo, Japan:
  - Hong Kong 0–2 China
  - Japan 1–3 South Korea
    - Final standings: China PR 7 points, Korea Republic 6, Japan 4, Hong Kong 0.
      - China PR win the tournament for the second time.
- OFC Champions League Group stage, Matchday 4:
  - Group B: Lautoka F.C. (Fiji) 3–0 (Solomon Islands) Marist FC
    - Standings (after 4 matches): Lautoka F.C. 9 points, PRK Hekari United, Tafea FC 7, Marist FC 0.
- (Australia) A-League:
  - Sydney FC def. Melbourne Victory 2–0 to win the A-League Premiership.

==== Golf ====
- PGA Tour:
  - AT&T Pebble Beach National Pro-Am in Pebble Beach, California:
    - Winner: Dustin Johnson (USA) 270 (−16)
      - Johnson wins his third PGA Tour title.
- European Tour:
  - Avantha Masters in New Delhi, India:
    - Winner: Andrew Dodt (AUS) 274 (−14)
      - Dodt wins his first European Tour title.
- Champions Tour:
  - The ACE Group Classic in Naples, Florida
    - Winner: Fred Couples (USA) 199 (−17)
      - In the first full-field event of the Champions Tour season, Couples collects his first victory on the senior circuit in his second start.

==== Handball ====
- Asian Men's Championship in Beirut, Lebanon: (teams in **bold** advance to the final round)
  - Group E:
    - Iran 21–22 Qatar
    - Japan 26–28 Saudi Arabia
      - Standings (after 2 matches): Saudi Arabia 4 points, Japan, Qatar 2, Iran 0.
  - Group F:
    - South Korea 39–26 Bahrain
    - Syria 32–29 Lebanon
      - Standings (after 2 matches): South Korea 4 points, Bahrain, Syria 2, Lebanon 0.

==== Olympic Games ====
- Winter Olympics in Vancouver, Canada:
  - Alpine skiing – Women's combined: postponed
  - Biathlon – Men's sprint: (gold) Vincent Jay (FRA) 24:07.8 (0 penalties) (silver) Emil Hegle Svendsen (NOR) 24:20.0 (1) (bronze) Jakov Fak (CRO) 24:21.8 (0)
  - Freestyle skiing – Men's moguls: (gold) Alexandre Bilodeau (CAN) 26.75 (silver) Dale Begg-Smith (AUS) 26.58 (bronze) Bryon Wilson (USA) 26.08
    - Bilodeau becomes the first Canadian to win a gold medal in an Olympics hosted by the country.
  - Luge – Men's singles: (gold) Felix Loch (GER) 3:13.085 (silver) David Möller (GER) 3:13.764 (bronze) Armin Zöggeler (ITA) 3:14.375
  - Nordic combined – Individual normal hill/10 km: (gold) Jason Lamy-Chappuis (FRA) 25:47.1 (silver) Johnny Spillane (USA) +0.4 (bronze) Alessandro Pittin (ITA) +0.8
  - Speed skating – Women's 3000 metres: (gold) Martina Sáblíková (CZE) 4:02.53 (silver) Stephanie Beckert (GER) 4:04.62 (bronze) Kristina Groves (CAN) 4:04.84
  - Figure skating – Pairs Short program: (1) Shen Xue/Zhao Hongbo (CHN) 76.66 WR (2) Aliona Savchenko/Robin Szolkowy (GER) 75.96 (3) Yuko Kavaguti/Alexander Smirnov (RUS) 74.16
    - Shen/Zhao set a new world record in short program, improving their previous mark by 1.3 points.
  - Ice hockey – Women:
    - Group B:
      - United States 12–1 China
      - Finland 5–1 Russia

==== Rugby union ====
- Six Nations Championship, week 2:
  - Italy 12–17 England in Rome
    - Standings (after 2 matches): France, England 4 points, Ireland, Wales 2, Scotland, Italy 0.
- IRB Sevens World Series
  - USA Sevens in Whitney, Nevada:
    - Cup Final: New Zealand 12–33 Samoa
    - Standings after 4 of 8 rounds: (1) New Zealand 84 points (2) Samoa 70 (3) Fiji 68

==== Sailing ====
- 33rd America's Cup in Valencia, Spain:
  - Race 2: BMW Oracle Racing (USA) defeat Alinghi (SUI) by 5:26 minutes. BMW Oracle Racing win best-of-3 series 2–0.

==== Tennis ====
- ATP World Tour:
  - Brasil Open in Costa do Sauípe, Brazil:
    - Final: **Juan Carlos Ferrero** (ESP) def. Łukasz Kubot (POL), 6–1, 6–0
      - Ferrero wins his 13th career title.
  - ABN AMRO World Tennis Tournament in Rotterdam, Netherlands:
    - Final: **Robin Söderling** (SWE) def. Mikhail Youzhny (RUS), 6–4, 2–0, ret.
      - Söderling wins his fifth career title.
  - SAP Open in San Jose, United States:
    - Final: **Fernando Verdasco** (ESP) def. Andy Roddick (USA), 3–6, 6–4, 6–4
      - Verdasco wins his fourth career title.
- WTA Tour:
  - Open GDF Suez in Paris, France:
    - Final: **Elena Dementieva** (RUS) def. Lucie Šafářová (CZE) 6–7(5), 6–1, 6–4
      - Dementieva wins her 16th career title.
  - PTT Pattaya Open in Pattaya, Thailand:
    - Final: **Vera Zvonareva** (RUS) def. Tamarine Tanasugarn (THA), 6–4, 6–4
      - Zvonareva wins the tenth title of her career, and her second consecutive title at the event.

=== February 13, 2010 (Saturday) ===
==== Auto racing ====
- Nationwide Series:
  - DRIVE4COPD 300 in Daytona Beach, Florida:
    - (1) (Indiana) Tony Stewart (Chevrolet, Stewart Haas Racing) (2) (Missouri) Carl Edwards (Ford, Roush Fenway Racing) (3) (California) Kevin Harvick (Chevrolet, Kevin Harvick Incorporated)
      - Danica Patrick is involved in a 12-car crash in her NASCAR debut.

==== Cricket ====
- ICC World Twenty20 Qualifier in United Arab Emirates:
  - Super Four: (teams in **bold** advance to the final and qualify for 2010 ICC World Twenty20)
    - United Arab Emirates 100/9 (20 overs); **Afghanistan** 101/6 (19.3 overs) in Dubai. **Afghanistan win by 4 wickets**.
    - **Ireland** 151/6 (20 overs); Netherlands 86 (15.3 overs) in Dubai. **Ireland win by 65 runs**.
      - Final standings: Ireland, Afghanistan 4 points, United Arab Emirates, Netherlands 2.
  - Final: Ireland 142/8 (20 overs); Afghanistan 147/2 (17.3 overs) in Dubai. **Afghanistan win by 8 wickets**.

==== Football (soccer) ====
- East Asian Women's Football Championship in Tokyo, Japan:
  - Chinese Taipei 0–3 China
  - Japan 2–1 South Korea
    - Final standings: Japan 9 points, China 6, Korea 3, Chinese Taipei 0.
      - Japan win the tournament for the second consecutive time.
- OFC Champions League Group stage, Matchday 4:
  - Group B: PRK Hekari United (Papua New Guinea) 4–0 (Vanuatu) Tafea FC
    - Standings: PRK Hekari United, Tafea FC 7 points (4 matches), Lautoka F.C. 6 (3), Marist FC 0 (3)

==== Handball ====
- Asian Men's Championship in Beirut, Lebanon:
  - Group E:
    - Iran 19–26 Saudi Arabia
    - Japan 29–20 Qatar
      - Standings (after 1 match): Japan, Saudi Arabia 2 points, Iran, Qatar 0.
  - Group F:
    - Syria 32–35 Bahrain
    - South Korea 38–23 Lebanon
      - Standings (after 1 match): South Korea, Bahrain 2 points, Syria, Lebanon 0.
- African Men's Championship in Egypt: (teams in **bold** advance to the main round)
  - Group A:
    - Libya 18–26 **Congo DR**
    - Nigeria 20–33 **Tunisia**
      - Final standings: Tunisia 6 points, Congo DR, Nigeria 3, Libya 0.
  - Group B:
    - Cameroon 33–33 Gabon
    - **Egypt** 28–20 **Angola**
      - Final standings: Egypt 6 points, Angola 4, Gabon, Cameroon 1.
  - Group C:
    - **Morocco** 16–35 **Algeria**
    - Ivory Coast 20–22 Congo
      - Finals standings: Algeria 6 points, Morocco 4, Congo 2, Côte d'Ivoire 0.
- African Women's Championship in Egypt:
  - Group A:
    - Cameroon 23–24 Algeria
    - Ivory Coast 27–31 Tunisia
      - Final standings: Tunisia 6 points, Côte d'Ivoire 4, Algeria 2, Cameroon 0.
  - Group B:
    - Angola 25–25 Congo
    - Congo DR 29–29 Egypt
      - Final standings: Angola 5 points, Congo 4, Egypt 2, Congo DR 1.

==== Olympic Games ====
- Winter Olympics in Vancouver, Canada:
  - Alpine skiing – Men's downhill: postponed
  - Biathlon – Women's sprint: (gold) Anastasiya Kuzmina (SVK) 19:55.6 (1 penalty), (silver) Magdalena Neuner (GER) (1) 19:57.1 (bronze) Marie Dorin (FRA) 20:06.5 (0)
  - Freestyle skiing – Women's moguls: (gold) Hannah Kearney (USA) 26.63 (silver) Jennifer Heil (CAN) 25.69 (bronze) Shannon Bahrke 25.43
  - Short track speed skating – Men's 1500 metres: (gold) Lee Jung-su (KOR) 2:17.611 (silver) Apolo Anton Ohno (USA) 2:17.976 (bronze) J.R. Celski (USA) 2:18.053
  - Ski jumping – Normal hill individual: (gold) Simon Ammann (SUI) 276.5 points (105.0m/108.0m) (silver) Adam Małysz (POL) 269.5 (103.5/105) (bronze) Gregor Schlierenzauer (AUT) 268.0 (101.5/106.5)
  - Speed skating – Men's 5000 metres: (gold) Sven Kramer (NED) 6:14.60 OR (silver) Lee Seung-hoon (KOR) 6:16.95 (bronze) Ivan Skobrev (RUS) 6:18.05
  - Ice hockey – Women:
    - Group A:
      - Sweden 3–0 Switzerland
      - Canada 18–0 Slovakia
  - Luge – Men's singles:
    - Standings after 2 runs: (1) Felix Loch (GER) 1:36.570 (2) David Möller (GER) +0.282 (3) Armin Zöggeler (ITA) +0.432

==== Rugby union ====
- Six Nations Championship, week 2:
  - Wales 31–24 Scotland in Cardiff
  - France 33–10 Ireland in Paris
    - Standings: France 4 points (2 matches), England 2 (1), Ireland, Wales 2 (2), Scotland 0 (2), Italy 0 (1).
- 2011 Rugby World Cup qualifying:
  - European Nations Cup First Division, matchday 7:
    - Romania 67–5 Germany in Constanța
    - Portugal 10–16 Georgia in Lisbon
    - Spain 20–38 Russia in Madrid
      - Standings: Georgia 20 points (7 matches), Russia 19 (7), Portugal 14 (7), Romania 12 (6), Spain 8 (6), Germany 7 (7).

=== February 12, 2010 (Friday) ===
==== Cricket ====
- West Indies in Australia:
  - 3rd ODI in Sydney:
    - Australia 225 (49.5 overs); West Indies 6/0 (1.0 overs). **No result. Australia lead 5-match series 2–0.**
- ICC World Twenty20 Qualifier in United Arab Emirates:
  - Super Four:
    - Afghanistan 128/9 (20 overs); Netherlands 132/6 (18.5 overs) in Dubai. **Netherlands win by 4 wickets**.
    - Ireland 152/7 (20 overs); United Arab Emirates 130 (19.1 overs) in Dubai. **Ireland win by 22 runs**.
      - Standings (after 2 matches): Ireland, Afghanistan, Netherlands, United Arab Emirates 2 points.

==== Football (soccer) ====
- OFC Champions League Group stage, Matchday 4:
  - Group A: AS Manu-Ura (French Polynesia) 0–2 (New Zealand) Auckland City FC
    - Standings: Auckland City FC 10 points (4 matches), Waitakere United 5 (3), AS Magenta 2 (3), AS Manu-Ura 1 (4).

==== Handball ====
- African Men's Championship in Egypt: (teams in **bold** advance to the main round)
  - Group A:
    - Libya 27–31 Nigeria
    - Congo DR 22–36 **Tunisia**
      - Standings: Tunisia 4 points, Nigeria 3, Congo DR 1, Libya 0.
  - Group B:
    - Gabon 25–27 **Angola**
    - Cameroon 17–30 **Egypt**
      - Standings: Egypt, Angola 4 points, Gabon, Cameroon 0.
  - Group C:
    - Congo 13–31 **Algeria**
    - Ivory Coast 23–32 **Morocco**
      - Standings: Algeria, Morocco 4 points, Congo, Côte d'Ivoire 0.
- African Women's Championship in Egypt:
  - Group A:
    - Cameroon 15–17 Ivory Coast
    - Algeria 20–35 Tunisia
      - Standings: Tunisia, Côte d'Ivoire 4 points, Cameroon, Algeria 0.
  - Group B:
    - Congo DR 15–24 Angola
    - Egypt 27–27 Congo
      - Standings: Angola 4 points, Congo 3, Egypt 1, Congo DR 0.

==== Sailing ====
- 33rd America's Cup in Valencia, Spain:
  - Race 1: BMW Oracle Racing (USA) defeat Alinghi (SUI) by 15:28 minutes. BMW Oracle Racing lead best-of-3 series 1–0.

==== Olympic Games ====
- Winter Olympics in Vancouver, Canada:
  - News: Georgian luger Nodar Kumaritashvili dies in a crash during a practice run just few hours before the Opening ceremony.

=== February 11, 2010 (Thursday) ===
==== Auto racing ====
- News: NASCAR announces a change to the green-white-checker rule for all of its national series, effective with today's Gatorade Duels. Up to three attempts at a green-flag finish can now be made, up from one last season. (ESPN)

==== Basketball ====
- Euroleague Top 16, matchday 3:
  - Group E:
    - Maroussi Athens (Greece) 57–49 (Serbia) Partizan Belgrade
    - Regal FC Barcelona (Spain) 83–71 (Greece) Panathinaikos Athens
      - Standings: Regal FC Barcelona, Maroussi Athens, Partizan Belgrade 2–1, Panathinaikos Athens 0–3.
  - Group F:
    - Maccabi Tel Aviv (Israel) 72–62 (Turkey) Efes Pilsen Istanbul
    - Montepaschi Siena (Italy) 83–76 (Spain) Real Madrid
      - Standings: Montepaschi Siena, Maccabi Tel Aviv 2–1, Real Madrid, Efes Pilsen Istanbul 1–2.
  - Group H: Caja Laboral Baskonia (Spain) 71–82 (Russia) Khimki Moscow Region
    - Standings: Olympiacos Piraeus 3–0, Caja Laboral Baskonia 2–1, Khimki Moscow Region 1–2, Cibona Zagreb 0–3.

==== Cricket ====
- Bangladesh in New Zealand:
  - 3rd ODI in Christchurch:
    - Bangladesh 241/9 (50 overs); New Zealand 244/7 (44.5 overs). **New Zealand win by 3 wickets, win the 3-match series 3–0**.
- ICC World Twenty20 Qualifier in United Arab Emirates: (teams in **bold** advance to the Super Four)
  - Group A:
    - **Afghanistan** 135/4 (20 overs); United States 106/7 (20 overs) in Dubai. **Afghanistan win by 29 runs**.
    - **Ireland** 136/7 (20 overs) v Scotland 99 all out (18.3 overs) in Dubai. **Ireland win by 37 runs**.
      - Final standings: Afghanistan 6 points, Ireland 4, United States 2, Scotland 0.
  - Group B:
    - **United Arab Emirates**; Canada 142/7 (20 overs) 100 (15.5 overs) in Abu Dhabi. **United Arab Emirates win by 42 runs**.
    - Kenya 130 (19.4 overs); **Netherlands** 133/3 (19.1 overs) in Abu Dhabi. **Netherlands win by 7 wickets** .
      - Final standings: United Arab Emirates 6 points, Netherlands 4, Kenya 2, Canada 0.

==== Darts ====
- Premier League round 1 in London, England:
  - Ronnie Baxter (ENG) 7–7 Terry Jenkins (ENG)
  - Mervyn King (ENG) 8–5 Adrian Lewis (ENG)
  - Raymond van Barneveld (NED) 8–5 James Wade (ENG)
  - Simon Whitlock (ENG) 3–8 Phil Taylor (ENG)
    - High Checkout: Mervyn King 124
      - Standings: Taylor, King, van Barneveld 2 points, Jenkins, Baxter 1, Lewis, Wade, Whitlock 0.

==== Football (soccer) ====
- East Asian Men's Football Championship in Tokyo, Japan:
  - Japan 3–0 Hong Kong
    - Standings (after 2 matches): China, Japan 4 points, Korea 3, Hong Kong 0.
- East Asian Women's Football Championship in Tokyo, Japan:
  - Japan 3–0 Chinese Taipei
    - Standings (after 2 matches): Japan 6 points, Korea, China 3, Chinese Taipei 0.
- Copa Libertadores second stage:
  - Group 1: Cerro Porteño (Paraguay) 1–1 (Colombia) Independiente Medellín
  - Group 3: Estudiantes (Argentina) 5–1 (Peru) Juan Aurich
  - Group 4: Blooming (Bolivia) 1–2 (Peru) Universitario
  - Group 6: Nacional (Uruguay) 3–2 (Ecuador) Deportivo Cuenca

==== Handball ====
- Asian Men's Championship in Beirut, Lebanon: (teams in **bold** advance to the main round)
  - Group B:
    - **Japan** 31–27 **Bahrain**
      - Final standings: Japan 4 points, Bahrain 2, Iraq 0.
  - Group C:
    - **South Korea** 29–23 **Qatar**
      - Final standings: South Korea 4 points, Qatar, United Arab Emirates 1.
- African Men's Championship in Egypt:
  - Group A:
    - Congo DR 27–27 Nigeria
    - Tunisia 43–24 Libya
  - Group B:
    - Angola 25–22 Cameroon
    - Egypt 27–21 Gabon
  - Group C:
    - Congo 24–27 Morocco
    - Ivory Coast 11–29 Algeria
- African Women's Championship in Egypt:
  - Group A:
    - Ivory Coast 22–19 Algeria
    - Tunisia 25–19 Cameroon
  - Group B:
    - Congo 37–31 Congo DR
    - Angola 32–21 Egypt

=== February 10, 2010 (Wednesday) ===
==== Basketball ====
- Euroleague Top 16, matchday 3:
  - Group G:
    - CSKA Moscow (Russia) 84–73 (Poland) Asseco Prokom Gdynia
    - Unicaja Málaga (Spain) 86–68 (Lithuania) Žalgiris Kaunas
      - Standings: CSKA Moscow 3–0, Asseco Prokom Gdynia 2–1, Unicaja Málaga 1–2, Žalgiris Kaunas 0–3.
  - Group H: Olympiacos Piraeus (Greece) 78–75 (Croatia) Cibona Zagreb
    - Standings: Olympiacos Piraeus 3–0, Caja Laboral Baskonia, Khimki Moscow Region 1–1, Cibona Zagreb 0–3.

==== Cricket ====
- ICC World Twenty20 Qualifier in United Arab Emirates: (teams in **bold** advance to the Super Four)
  - Group A:
    - Afghanistan 131/7 (20 overs); Scotland 119/7 (20 overs) in Abu Dhabi. **Afghanistan win by 14 runs**.
    - Ireland 202/4 (20 overs); United States 124/6 (20 overs) in Abu Dhabi. **Ireland win by 78 runs**.
      - Standings: Afghanistan 4 points, Ireland, United States 2, Scotland 0.
  - Group B:
    - Canada 138/9 (20 overs); Kenya 141/1 (14.5 overs) in Dubai. **Kenya win by 9 wickets**.
    - Netherlands 164/8 (20 overs); **United Arab Emirates** 168/4 (18.5 overs) in Dubai. **United Arab Emirates win by 6 wickets**.
      - Standings: United Arab Emirates 4 points, Kenya, Netherlands 2, Canada 0.

==== Football (soccer) ====
- East Asian Men's Football Championship in Tokyo, Japan:
  - China 3–0 South Korea
    - Standings: China 4 points (2 matches), Korea 3 (2), Japan 1 (1), Hong Kong 0 (1).
- East Asian Women's Football Championship in Tokyo, Japan:
  - China 2–1 South Korea
    - Standings: Korea 3 points (2 matches), Japan 3 (1), China 3 (2), Chinese Taipei 0 (1).
- Copa Libertadores First Stage, second leg: (first leg score in parentheses)
  - **Emelec** (Ecuador) 2–1 (0–0) (Argentina) Newell's Old Boys. Emelec win 2–1 on aggregate.
- Copa Libertadores second stage:
  - Group 2: São Paulo (Brazil) 2–0 (Mexico) Monterrey
  - Group 3: Bolívar (Bolivia) 1–3 (Peru) Alianza Lima
  - Group 6: Banfield (Argentina) 2–1 (Mexico) Morelia
  - Group 7: Vélez Sarsfield (Argentina) 2–0 (Brazil) Cruzeiro

==== Handball ====
- Asian Men's Championship in Beirut, Lebanon: (teams in **bold** advance to the main round)
  - Group A:
    - **Saudi Arabia** 20–22 China
      - Final standings: **Syria** 2 points, Saudi Arabia 2, China 2.
  - Group D:
    - **Iran** 25–16 **Lebanon**
      - Final standings: Iran 4 points, Lebanon 2, Jordan 0.

=== February 9, 2010 (Tuesday) ===
==== Basketball ====
- ULEB Eurocup Last 16, matchday 3:
  - Group I:
    - ALBA Berlin (Germany) 61–65 (Greece) Aris BSA 2003
    - Le Mans (France) 62–70 (Spain) DKV Joventut
  - Group J:
    - UNICS Kazan (Russia) 78–71 (Israel) Hapoel Jerusalem
    - Galatasaray Café Crown (Turkey) 78–82 (Spain) Power Elec Valencia
  - Group K:
    - Panellinios BC (Greece) 88–79 (Italy) Benetton Basket
    - Brose Baskets (Germany) 55–76 (Spain) Bizkaia Bilbao Basket
  - Group L:
    - Türk Telekom (Turkey) 67–89 (Serbia) Crvena zvezda
    - Gran Canaria 2014 (Spain) 69–54 (Czech Republic) ČEZ Nymburk

==== Cricket ====
- South Africa In India:
  - 1st Test in Nagpur:
    - South Africa 558/6d (Hashim Amla 253*, Jacques Kallis 173); India 233 (Virender Sehwag 109, Dale Steyn 7–51) and 319 (Sachin Tendulkar 100) (f/o). **South Africa win by an innings and 6 runs, lead the 2-match series 1–0**.
- West Indies in Australia:
  - 2nd ODI in Adelaide:
    - West Indies 170 (39.4 overs); Australia 171/2 (26.3 overs). **Australia win by 8 wickets, lead the 5-match series 2–0.**
- ICC World Twenty20 Qualifier in United Arab Emirates:
  - Group A:
    - Afghanistan 139/8 (20 overs); Ireland 126 all out (19.2 overs) in Dubai. **Afghanistan win by 13 runs**.
    - Scotland 120/7 (20 overs); United States 121/4 (20 overs) in Abu Dhabi. **USA win by 6 wickets**.
  - Group B:
    - Canada 142/7 (20 overs); Netherlands 146/4 (19.1 overs) in Dubai. **Netherlands win by 6 wickets**.
    - United Arab Emirates 165/5 (20 overs); Kenya 150/5 (20 overs) in Abu Dhabi. **UAE win by 15 runs**.

==== Football (soccer) ====
- Copa Libertadores First Stage, second leg: (first leg score in parentheses)
  - **Universidad Católica** (Chile) 3–2 (2–3) (Argentina) Colón. 5–5 on aggregate, Universidad Católica win 5–3 in penalty shootout.
- Copa Libertadores second stage:
  - Group 2: Nacional (Paraguay) 0–2 (Colombia) Once Caldas
  - Group 4: Lanús (Argentina) 0–2 (Paraguay) Libertad
  - Group 5: Cerro (Uruguay) 2–0 (Ecuador) Deportivo Quito

==== Handball ====
- Asian Men's Championship in Beirut, Lebanon: (teams in **bold** advance to the main round)
  - Group B:
    - Iraq 19–30 **Bahrain**
    - Standings: **Japan (Heian period)**, Bahrain 2 points (1 match), Iraq 0 (2).
  - Group C:
    - United Arab Emirates 25–25 Qatar
    - Standings: **South Korea** 2 points (1 match), Qatar 1 (1), United Arab Emirates 1 (2).

=== February 8, 2010 (Monday) ===
==== Cricket ====
- Bangladesh in New Zealand:
  - 2nd ODI in Dunedin:
    - Bangladesh 183/8 (50 overs); New Zealand 185/5 (27.3 overs). **New Zealand win by 5 wickets, lead the 3-match series 2–0**.

==== Handball ====
- Asian Men's Championship in Beirut, Lebanon: (teams in **bold** advance to the main round)
  - Group A:
    - **Syria** 28–21 China
    - Standings: Saudi Arabia 2 points (1 match), Syria 2 (2), China 0 (1).
  - Group D:
    - **Iran** 38–23 Jordan
    - Standings: Iran, **Lebanon** 2 points (1 match), Jordan 0 (2).

=== February 7, 2010 (Sunday) ===
==== American football ====
- NFL:
  - Super Bowl XLIV in Miami Gardens, Florida:
    - New Orleans Saints 31, Indianapolis Colts 17
      - The Saints' first world championship was propelled by Drew Brees' leadership that led him to his Most Valuable Player award. Tracy Porter's seventy-yard interception of a Peyton Manning pass for a touchdown was the margin of victory.

==== Baseball ====
- Caribbean Series in Margarita Island, Venezuela:
  - Indios de Mayagüez (Puerto Rico) 8–2 (Mexico) Naranjeros de Hermosillo
  - Leones del Escogido (Dominican Republic) 7–4 (Venezuela) Leones del Caracas
    - Final standings: Leones del Escogido 5–1, Indios de Mayagüez 4–2, Naranjeros de Hermosillo 2–4, Leones del Caracas 1–5.
    - Leones del Escogido win the Caribbean Series for the third time. Fernando Martínez wins the MVP award.

==== Cricket ====
- West Indies in Australia:
  - 1st ODI in Melbourne:
    - Australia 256/8 (50 overs); West Indies 143 (34.2 overs). **Australia win by 113 runs, lead the 5-match series 1–0**.

==== Football (soccer) ====
- UEFA Euro 2012 qualifying draw in Warsaw, Poland:
  - Group A: Austria, Azerbaijan, Belgium, Germany, Kazakhstan, Turkey
  - Group B: Andorra, Armenia, Macedonia, Republic of Ireland, Russia, Slovakia
  - Group C: Estonia, Faroe Islands, Italy, Northern Ireland, Serbia, Slovenia
  - Group D: Albania, Belarus, Bosnia and Herzegovina, France, Luxembourg, Romania
  - Group E: Finland, Hungary, Moldova, Netherlands, San Marino, Sweden
  - Group F: Croatia, Georgia, Greece, Israel, Latvia, Malta
  - Group G: Bulgaria, England, Montenegro, Switzerland, Wales
  - Group H: Cyprus, Denmark, Iceland, Portugal, Norway
  - Group I: Czech Republic, Liechtenstein, Lithuania, Scotland, Spain
- East Asian Men's Football Championship in Tokyo, Japan:
  - South Korea 5–0 Hong Kong
- East Asian Women's Football Championship in Tokyo, Japan:
  - South Korea 4–0 Chinese Taipei

==== Golf ====
- PGA Tour:
  - Northern Trust Open in Pacific Palisades, California:
    - Winner: Steve Stricker (USA) 268 (−16)
      - Stricker wins his eighth PGA Tour title.
- European Tour:
  - Dubai Desert Classic in United Arab Emirates:
    - Winner: Miguel Ángel Jiménez (ESP) 277 (−11)
      - Jiménez wins his sixteenth European Tour title.

==== Handball ====
- Asian Men's Championship in Beirut, Lebanon:
  - Group B:
    - Japan 35–21 Iraq
  - Group C:
    - South Korea 30–23 United Arab Emirates

==== Rugby union ====
- Six Nations Championship, week 1:
  - Scotland 9–18 France in Edinburgh

==== Ski jumping ====
- World Cup in Willingen, Germany:
  - HS 145 Team: (gold) Germany (Michael Neumayer, Pascal Bodmer, Martin Schmitt, Michael Uhrmann) 965.5 points (silver) Norway (Johan Remen Evensen, Tom Hilde, Anders Jacobsen, Bjørn Einar Romøren) 959.6 (bronze) Austria (Florian Schabereiter, Michael Hayböck, Stefan Thurnbichler, David Zauner) 937.1

==== Tennis ====
- ATP World Tour:
  - Movistar Open in Santiago, Chile:
    - Final: Thomaz Bellucci (BRA) def. Juan Mónaco (ARG) 6–2, 0–6, 6–4
      - It was Bellucci's first title of the year and second of his career.
  - PBZ Zagreb Indoors in Zagreb, Croatia:
    - Final: Marin Čilić (CRO) def. Michael Berrer (GER) 6–4, 6–7(5), 6–3
      - Čilić wins the tournament for the second straight year, for his second title of the year and 5th of his career.
  - SA Tennis Open in Johannesburg, South Africa:
    - Final: Feliciano López (ESP) def. Stéphane Robert (FRA) 7–5, 6–1
      - López wins his second career title.
- Fed Cup:
  - World Group first round, day 2:
    - Ukraine 1–4 **Italy**
    - **Czech Republic** 3–2 Germany
    - Serbia 2–3 **Russia**
    - France 1–4 **United States**
  - World Group II First round, day 2:
    - **Australia** 3–2 Spain
    - Poland 2–3 **Belgium**
    - **Estonia** 4–1 Argentina
    - **Slovakia** 3–2 China

=== February 6, 2010 (Saturday) ===
==== American football ====
- College bowl games:
  - Texas vs. The Nation Game in El Paso, Texas
    - Texas 36, The Nation 17
      - LSU's Trindon Holliday and the all-star Texas squad helped bring down the final curtain on the college football postseason with a 36–17 victory over The Nation squad. Holliday was named Offensive Player of the Game.
- NFL news:
  - The Pro Football Hall of Fame announces its induction class of 2010. Russ Grimm, Rickey Jackson, Dick LeBeau, Floyd Little, John Randle, Jerry Rice, and Emmitt Smith will enter the Hall on August 7.

==== Auto racing ====
- NASCAR Sprint Cup Series:
  - Budweiser Shootout in Daytona Beach, Florida:
    - (1) (California) Kevin Harvick (2) (Washington (state)) Kasey Kahne (3) (Missouri) Jamie McMurray
  - Daytona 500 pole qualifying:
    - (Arkansas) Mark Martin claims pole position, with (North Carolina) Dale Earnhardt Jr. on his outside. The remainder of the field will be set in twin 150-mile qualifiers on February 11.

==== Baseball ====
- Caribbean Series in Margarita Island, Venezuela:
  - Naranjeros de Hermosillo (Mexico) 2–7 (Dominican Republic) Leones del Escogido
  - Indios de Mayagüez (Puerto Rico) 7–1 (Venezuela) Leones del Caracas
    - Standings: Leones del Escogido 4–1, Indios de Mayagüez 3–2, Naranjeros de Hermosillo 2–3, Leones del Caracas 1–4.

==== Basketball ====
- FIBA Americas League Final Four in Mar del Plata, Argentina:
  - Quimsa (Argentina) 62–71 (Venezuela) Espartanos de Margarita
  - Peñarol (Argentina) 93–91 (OT) (Mexico) Halcones Xalapa
    - Final standings: Peñarol 3–0, Espartanos de Margarita, Halcones Xalapa, Quimsa 1–2.
      - Peñarol win the title for the second time in three years.

==== Cross-country skiing ====
- World Cup in Canmore, Canada:
  - Women's Sprint Classic: (gold) Justyna Kowalczyk (POL) (silver) Ida Ingemarsdotter (SWE) (bronze) Sara Renner (CAN)
    - Overall standings: (1) Kowalczyk 1595 points (2) Petra Majdič (SLO) 1191 (3) Aino-Kaisa Saarinen (FIN) 909
    - Sprint standings: (1) Majdič 446 points (2) Kowalczyk 439 (3) Saarinen 295
  - Men's Sprint Classic: (gold) Emil Jönsson (SWE) (silver) John Kristian Dahl (NOR) (bronze) Dario Cologna (SUI)
    - Overall standings: (1) Petter Northug (NOR) 1060 points (2) Lukáš Bauer (CZE) 763 (3) Cologna 735
    - Sprint standings: (1) Jönsson 327 points (2) Dahl 280 (3) Ola Vigen Hattestad (NOR) 250

==== Football (soccer) ====
- AFC Champions League qualifying play-off, Final Round:
  - **Singapore Armed Forces** 0–0 (4–3 pen.) (Thailand) Muangthong United
  - **Al-Wahda** (United Arab Emirates) 5–2 (India) Churchill Brothers
- East Asian Men's Football Championship in Tokyo, Japan:
  - Japan 0–0 China
- East Asian Women's Football Championship in Tokyo, Japan:
  - Japan 2–0 China

==== Handball ====
- Asian Men's Championship in Beirut, Lebanon:
  - Group A:
    - Saudi Arabia 23–22 Syria
  - Group D:
    - Jordan 21–34 Lebanon

==== Rugby union ====
- Six Nations Championship, week 1:
  - Ireland 29–11 Italy in Dublin
  - England 30–17 Wales in London
- 2011 Rugby World Cup qualifying:
  - European Nations Cup First Division, matchday 6:
    - Russia 14–10 Portugal in Sochi
    - Romania – Spain in Bucharest — postponed (snow)
    - Georgia 77–3 Germany in Tbilisi
      - Standings: Georgia 17 points (6 matches), Russia 16 (6), Portugal 13 (6), Romania 9 (5), Spain 7 (5), Germany 6 (6).
- IRB Sevens World Series
  - New Zealand Sevens in Wellington:
    - Cup Final: Samoa 14–19 Fiji
    - Standings after 3 of 8 rounds: (1) New Zealand 64 points (2) Fiji 60 (3) Samoa 46

==== Ski jumping ====
- World Cup in Willingen, Germany:
  - HS 145: (gold) Gregor Schlierenzauer (AUT) 273.3 points (142.5m/137.5m) (silver) Anders Jacobsen (NOR) 269.0 (139.0m/138.5m) (bronze) Michael Neumayer (GER) 264.5 (140.5m/141.0m)
    - Individual standings (after 19 of 23 events): (1) Simon Ammann (SUI) 1249 (2) Schlierenzauer 1192 (3) Thomas Morgenstern (AUT) 749

==== Snowboarding ====
- World Cup in Sudelfeld, Germany:
  - Men's parallel giant slalom: (gold) Andreas Prommegger (AUT) (silver) Benjamin Karl (AUT) (bronze) Roland Haldi (SUI)
    - Standings (after 7 of 10 events): (1) Karl 4800 points (2) Prommegger 4190 (3) Jasey-Jay Anderson (CAN) 3800
  - Women's parallel giant slalom: (gold) Amelie Kober (GER) (silver) Nicolien Sauerbreij (NED) (bronze) Marion Kreiner (AUT)
    - Standings (after 7 of 10 events): (1) Sauerbreij 3690 (2) Kober 3470 (3) Fraenzi Maegert-Kohli (SUI) 3420

==== Tennis ====
- Fed Cup:
  - World Group First round, day 1:
    - Ukraine 1–1 Italy
    - Czech Republic 1–1 Germany
    - Serbia 1–1 Russia
    - France 0–2 United States
  - World Group II First round, day 1:
    - Australia 1–1 Spain
    - Poland 1–1 Belgium
    - Estonia 2–0 Argentina
    - Slovakia 2–0 China

=== February 5, 2010 (Friday) ===
==== Baseball ====
- Caribbean Series in Margarita Island, Venezuela:
  - (Puerto Rico) Indios de Mayagüez 7, (Dominican Republic) Leones del Escogido 3
  - (Mexico) Naranjeros de Hermosillo 3, (Venezuela) Leones del Caracas 2
    - Standings: Leones del Escogido 3–1, Indios de Mayagüez, Naranjeros de Hermosillo 2–2, Leones del Caracas 1–3.

==== Basketball ====
- FIBA Americas League Final Four in Mar del Plata, Argentina:
  - Halcones Xalapa (Mexico) 82–78 (Venezuela) Espartanos de Margarita
  - Peñarol (Argentina) 87–58 (Argentina) Quimsa
    - Standings: Peñarol 2–0, Quimsa, Halcones Xalapa 1–1, Espartanos de Margarita 0–2.

==== Cricket ====
- Pakistan in Australia:
  - Only T20I in Melbourne:
    - Australia 127 (18.4/20 ov); Pakistan 125/9 (20/20 ov). **Australia win by 2 runs**.
- Bangladesh in New Zealand:
  - 1st ODI in Napier:
    - New Zealand 336/9 (50 ov); Bangladesh 190 (43.5 ov). **New Zealand win by 146 runs, lead the 3-match series 1–0**.

==== Cross-country skiing ====
- World Cup in Canmore, Canada:
  - Women's 10 km Freestyle: (gold) Charlotte Kalla (SWE) (silver) Justyna Kowalczyk (POL) (bronze) Irina Khazova (RUS)
    - Overall standings: (1) Kowalczyk 1495 points (2) Petra Majdič (SLO) 1167 (3) Aino-Kaisa Saarinen (FIN) 909
    - Distance standings: (1) Kowalczyk 756 points (2) Majdič 425 (3) Saarinen 414
  - Men's 15 km Freestyle: (gold) Giorgio Di Centa (ITA) (silver) Pietro Piller Cottrer (ITA) (bronze) Dario Cologna (SUI)
    - Overall standings: (1) Petter Northug (NOR) 1060 points (2) Lukáš Bauer (CZE) 763 (3) Cologna 675
    - Distance standings: (1) Northug 514 points (2) Marcus Hellner (SWE) 379 (3) Bauer 363

=== February 4, 2010 (Thursday) ===
==== Baseball ====
- Caribbean Series in Margarita Island, Venezuela:
  - (Puerto Rico) Indios de Mayagüez 5, (Mexico) Naranjeros de Hermosillo 3
  - (Dominican Republic) Leones del Escogido 3, (Venezuela) Leones del Caracas 2
    - Standings: Leones del Escogido 3–0, Leones del Caracas, Naranjeros de Hermosillo, Indios de Mayagüez 1–2.

==== Basketball ====
- Euroleague Top 16, matchday 2:
  - Group E: Maroussi Athens (Greece) 80–78 (Greece) Panathinaikos Athens
    - Standings: Partizan Belgrade 2–0, Regal FC Barcelona, Maroussi Athens 1–1, Panathinaikos Athens 0–2.
  - Group F: Maccabi Tel Aviv (Israel) 81–76 (Spain) Real Madrid
    - Standings: Efes Pilsen Istanbul, Real Madrid, Maccabi Tel Aviv, Montepaschi Siena 1–1.
  - Group H: Cibona Zagreb (Croatia) 75–78 (Spain) Caja Laboral Baskonia
    - Standings: Olympiacos Piraeus 2–0, Caja Laboral Baskonia, Khimki Moscow Region 1–1, Cibona Zagreb 0–2.
- FIBA Americas League Final Four in Mar del Plata, Argentina:
  - Halcones Xalapa (Mexico) 99–101 (Argentina) Quimsa
  - Peñarol (Argentina) 92–73 (Venezuela) Espartanos de Margarita

==== Cricket ====
- Associates Twenty20 Series in Kenya:
  - Scotland 123 (19.2/20 ov); Kenya 126/0 (14.3/20 ov) in Nairobi. **Kenya win by 10 wickets**.
    - Final standings: Kenya 8 points, Scotland 4, Uganda 0.
- Quadrangular Twenty20 Series in Sri Lanka:
  - Canada 140/6 (20/20 ov); Afghanistan 143/5 (19.5/20 ov) in Colombo. **Afghanistan win by 5 wickets**.
  - Ireland 174/6 (20/20 ov); Sri Lanka A 178/5 (18.2/20 ov) in Colombo. **Sri Lanka A win by 5 wickets**.
    - Final standings: Sri Lanka A 6 points, Afghanistan, Canada, Ireland 2.

==== Football (soccer) ====
- Copa Libertadores First Stage, second leg: (first leg score in parentheses)
  - **Racing** (Uruguay) 2–0 (2–2) (Colombia) Junior. Racing win 4–2 on aggregate.

=== February 3, 2010 (Wednesday) ===
==== Baseball ====
- Caribbean Series in Margarita Island, Venezuela:
  - (Dominican Republic) Leones del Escogido 7, (Mexico) Naranjeros de Hermosillo 1
  - (Venezuela) Leones del Caracas 5, (Puerto Rico) Indios de Mayagüez 2
    - Standings: Leones del Escogido 2–0, Leones del Caracas, Naranjeros de Hermosillo 1–1, Indios de Mayagüez 0–2.

==== Basketball ====
- Euroleague Top 16, matchday 2:
  - Group E: Partizan Belgrade (Serbia) 67–66 (OT) (Spain) Regal FC Barcelona
    - Barça lose for the first time in this season's Euroleague.
  - Group F: Efes Pilsen Istanbul (Turkey) 88–78 (Italy) Montepaschi Siena
  - Group G:
    - Žalgiris Kaunas (Lithuania) 68–83 (Russia) CSKA Moscow
    - Unicaja Málaga (Spain) 50–70 (Poland) Asseco Prokom Gdynia
      - Standings: Asseco Prokom Gdynia, CSKA Moscow 2–0, Unicaja Málaga, Žalgiris Kaunas 0–2.
  - Group H: Olympiacos Piraeus (Greece) 87–69 (Russia) Khimki Moscow Region

==== Cricket ====
- Bangladesh in New Zealand:
  - Only T20I in Hamilton:
  - Bangladesh 78 (17.3 overs); New Zealand 79/0 (8.2 overs). **New Zealand win by 10 wickets**.
- Associates Twenty20 Series in Kenya:
  - Scotland 163/4 (20/20 ov); Uganda 107/9 (20/20 ov) in Nairobi. **Scotland win by 56 runs**.
    - Standings: Kenya 6 points (3 matches), Scotland 4 (3), Uganda 0 (4).
- Quadrangular Twenty20 Series in Sri Lanka:
  - Canada 176/3 (20/20 ov); Ireland 172/8 (20/20 ov) in Colombo. **Canada win by 4 runs**.
  - Sri Lanka A 175/5 (20/20 ov); Afghanistan 106/8 (20/20 ov) in Colombo. **Sri Lanka A win by 69 runs**.
    - Standings (after 2 matches): Sri Lanka A 4 points, Canada, Ireland 2, Afghanistan 0.

==== Football (soccer) ====
- Copa Libertadores First Stage, second leg: (first leg score in parentheses)
  - Estudiantes Tecos (Mexico) 1–2 (0–2) (Peru) **Juan Aurich**. Juan Aurich win 4–1 on aggregate.
  - **Cruzeiro** (Brazil) 7–0 (1–1) (Bolivia) Real Potosí. Cruzeiro win 8–1 on aggregate.

==== Ski jumping ====
- World Cup in Klingenthal, Germany:
  - HS 140: (gold) Simon Ammann (SUI) 263.9 points (133.0m/134.0m) (silver) Adam Malysz (POL) 257.2 (130.5m/134.0m) (bronze) Gregor Schlierenzauer (AUT) 245.4 (129.0m/129.5m)
    - Individual standings (after 18 of 23 events): (1) Ammann 1249 (2) Schlierenzauer 1092 (3) Thomas Morgenstern (AUT) 699

=== February 2, 2010 (Tuesday) ===
==== Baseball ====
- Caribbean Series in Margarita Island, Venezuela:
  - (Dominican Republic) Leones del Escogido 2, (Puerto Rico) Indios de Mayagüez 1
  - (Mexico) Naranjeros de Hermosillo 7, (Venezuela) Leones del Caracas 1

==== Basketball ====
- ULEB Eurocup Last 16, matchday 2:
  - Group I:
    - ALBA Berlin (Germany) 72–68 (Spain) DKV Joventut
    - Aris BSA 2003 (Greece) 71–72 (France) Le Mans
  - Group J:
    - UNICS Kazan (Russia) 68–72 (Spain) Power Elec Valencia
    - Hapoel Jerusalem (Israel) 100–87 (Turkey) Galatasaray Café Crown
  - Group K:
    - Brose Baskets (Germany) 73–63 (Italy) Benetton Basket
    - Bizkaia Bilbao Basket (Spain) 81–61 (Greece) Panellinios BC
  - Group L:
    - Crvena zvezda (Serbia) 97–67 (Spain) Gran Canaria 2014
    - Türk Telekom (Turkey) 92–97 (Czech Republic) ČEZ Nymburk

==== Cricket ====
- Associates Twenty20 Series in Kenya:
  - Kenya 186/3 (20 overs); Uganda 172/9 (20 overs) in Nairobi. **Kenya win by 14 runs**.
    - Standings: Kenya 6 points (3 matches), Scotland 2 (2), Uganda 0 (3).

==== Football (soccer) ====
- Copa Libertadores First Stage, second leg: (first leg score in parentheses)
  - **Libertad** (Paraguay) 3–1 (0–1) (Venezuela) Deportivo Táchira. Libertad win 3–2 on aggregate.

=== February 1, 2010 (Monday) ===
==== Cricket ====
- Associates Twenty20 Series in Kenya:
  - Scotland 109/9 (20/20 ov); Kenya 110/0 (12.3/20 ov) in Nairobi. **Kenya win by 10 wickets**.
    - Standings (after 2 matches): Kenya 4 points, Scotland 2, Uganda 0.
- Quadrangular Twenty20 Series in Sri Lanka:
  - Canada 93/6 (20/20 ov); Sri Lanka A 94/1 (13/20 ov) in Colombo. **Sri Lanka A win by 9 wickets**.
  - Afghanistan 121/9 (20/20 ov); Ireland 124/5 (18.1/20 ov) in Colombo. **Ireland win by 5 wickets**.
