= Zimbabwean cricket team in the West Indies in 2009–10 =

Zimbabwean cricket team in West Indies in 2010
	Zimbabwe	West Indies
- Dates: 26 February 2010 – 14 March 2010
Captains	Prosper Utseya	Chris Gayle

One Day International series
- Results: West Indies won the 5-match series 4–1
Most runs	Elton Chigumbura 148	Chris Gayle 273
Most wickets	Graeme Cremer 7	Darren Sammy; Kemar Roach 8
- Player of the series: Chris Gayle (WI)

Twenty20 International series
- Results: Zimbabwe won the 1-match series 1–0
Most runs	Hamilton Masakadza (44)	Denesh Ramdin (23)
Most wickets	Graeme Cremer (3)	Darren Sammy (5)
- Player of the series: Graeme Cremer (Zim)

The Zimbabwe national cricket team toured the West Indies for a five-match One Day International (ODI) series and one Twenty20 International between 26 February and 14 March 2010.

== Tour matches ==
=== 50-over tour match: UWI Vice Chancellor's XI v Zimbabweans ===
26 February
Scorecard

Zimbabweans; 281 (49.2 overs)	v	UWI Vice Chancellor's XI; 276/8 (50 overs)
Tatenda Taibu 107 (N/A); Nekoli Parris 2/40 (4.2 overs)		Kraigg Brathwaite 80 (117); Elton Chigumbura 2/27 (7 overs)

Zimbabweans won by 5 runs
Sir Frank Worrell Memorial Ground, St Augustine, Trinidad
Umpires: Stuart Gopaul (WI) and Anthony Sanawar (WI)
Player of the match: Tatenda Taibu (Zim)

== Twenty20 International series ==
=== Only T20I ===
28 February
Scorecard

Zimbabwe; 105 (19.5 overs)	v	West Indies; 79/7 (20.0 overs)
Hamilton Masakadza 44 (57); Darren Sammy 5/26 (3.5 overs)		Denesh Ramdin 23* (36); Graeme Cremer 3/11 (4 overs)

Zimbabwe won by 26 runs
Queen's Park Oval, Port of Spain, Trinidad
Umpires: Clyde Duncan and Norman Malcolm
Player of the match: Graeme Cremer (Zim)

- Zimbabwe won the toss and elected to bat
- Darren Sammy's figures of 5 for 26 and Sulieman Benn's of 4 for 6 were the third and fourth best bowling figures in T20I at this point.

== One Day International series ==
=== 1st ODI ===
4 March
Scorecard

Zimbabwe; 254/5 (50.0 overs)	v	West Indies; 252/9 (50.0 overs)
Vusi Sibanda 95 (162); Kieron Pollard 2/59 (10 overs)		Shivnarine Chanderpaul 70 (70); Shingirai Masakadza 3/36 (3 overs)

Zimbabwe won by 2 runs
Providence Stadium, Guyana
Umpires: Clyde Duncan and Simon Taufel (Aus)
Player of the match: Vusi Sibanda (Zim)

- Zimbabwe won the toss and elected to bat

=== 2nd ODI ===
6 March
Scorecard

Zimbabwe; 206 (49.5 overs)	v	West Indies; 208/6 (47.5 overs)
Elton Chigumbura 50 (72); Nikita Miller 4/43 (9 overs)		Chris Gayle 88 (111); Ray Price 2/31 (8.5 overs)

West Indies won by 4 wickets
Providence Stadium, Guyana
Umpires: Clyde Duncan and Simon Taufel (Aus)
Player of the match: Narsingh Deonarine (WI)

- Zimbabwe won the toss and elected to bat.

=== 3rd ODI ===
10 March
Scorecard

West Indies; 245/9 (50 overs)	v	Zimbabwe; 104 (31.5 overs)
Shivnarine Chanderpaul 58 (76); Elton Chigumbura 3/43 (9 overs)		Hamilton Masakadza 35 (35); Darren Sammy 4/26 (10 overs)

West Indies won by 141 runs
Arnos Vale Stadium, Kingstown, St Vincent
Umpires: Norman Malcolm (WI) and Simon Taufel (AUS)
Player of the match: Darren Sammy (WI)

- Zimbabwe won the toss and elected to field.

=== 4th ODI ===
12 March
Scorecard

Zimbabwe; 141 (48.2 overs)	v	West Indies; 142/6 (34.3 overs)
E Chigumbura 42 (78); Dwayne Bravo 4/21 (9 overs)		Chris Gayle 32 (20); Graeme Cremer 3/34 (10 overs)

West Indies won by 4 wickets
Arnos Vale Stadium, Kingstown, St Vincent
Umpires: Norman Malcolm (WI) and Simon Taufel (Aus)
Player of the match: Dwayne Bravo (WI)

- West Indies won the toss and elected to field.

=== 5th ODI ===
14 March
Scorecard

Zimbabwe; 161 (50 overs)	v	West Indies; 165/6 (27.4 overs)
Charles Coventry 56 (88); Darren Sammy 3/33 (10 overs)		Chris Gayle 63 (41); Prosper Utseya 2/41 (7 overs)

West Indies won by 4 wickets
Arnos Vale Stadium, Kingstown, St Vincent
Umpires: Norman Malcolm (WI) and Simon Taufel (AUS)
Player of the match: Chris Gayle (WI)

- West Indies won the toss and elected to field.

== Media coverage ==
- Sky Sports (live) – United Kingdom
- SuperSport (live) – South Africa
- Ten Sports (live) – Middle East
- Zee Sports (live) – India
