= 2009–10 Euroleague Top 16 Group E =

Standings and Results for Group E of the Top 16 phase of the 2009–10 Euroleague basketball tournament.

== Standings ==
Key to colors
Top two places in each group advance to Quarterfinals
Eliminated

	Team	Pld	W	L	PF	PA	Diff	Tie-break
1.	(Spain) Regal FC Barcelona	6	5	1	465	396	+69	
2.	(Serbia) Partizan Belgrade	6	3	3	389	422	−33	
3.	(Greece) Panathinaikos Athens	6	2	4	439	442	−3	1–1, +1
4.	(Greece) Maroussi Athens	6	2	4	419	452	−33	1–1, –1

== Fixtures and results ==
All times given below are in Central European Time.

Unless otherwise indicated, all attendance totals are from the corresponding match report posted on the official Euroleague site and included with each game summary.

=== Game 1 ===
27 January 2010
20:00

Report

Panathinaikos Athens (Greece)	59–64	(Serbia) Partizan Belgrade
Scoring by quarter: 22-20, 20-16, 10-10, 7-18
Pts: Spanoulis 14; Rebs: Fotsis, Peković 6 Asts: Spanoulis 5		Pts: Veselý 13; Rebs: Roberts 10; Asts: Veselý, McCalebb 4

Olympic Indoor Hall
Attendance: 11,800
Referees: Grzegorz Ziemblicki (POL), Tolga Sahin (TUR), Robert Vyklicky (CZE)

28 January 2010
20:45

Report

Regal FC Barcelona (Spain)	79–69	(Greece) Maroussi Athens
Scoring by quarter: 19-5, 22-22, 16-20, 22-22
Pts: Navarro 17; Rebs: N'Dong 12; Asts: Navarro 8		Pts: Gordon 24; Rebs: Mavroeidis 6 Asts: Batis 4

Palau Blaugrana
Attendance: 4,139
Referees: Recep Ankaralı (TUR), Roberto Chiari (ITA), Tomas Jasevičius (LTU)

=== Game 2 ===
3 February 2010
20:45

Report

Partizan Belgrade (Serbia)	67–66 (OT)	(Spain) Regal FC Barcelona
Scoring by quarter: 23-12, 12-12, 8-23, 18-14, Overtime: 6-5
Pts: Veselý 13; Rebs: Veselý 15; Asts: Rašić 6		Pts: Lakovič 14; Rebs: Basile 6 Asts: Rubio 5

Pionir Hall
Attendance: 8,125
Referees: Luigi Lamonica (ITA), Jakub Zamojski (POL), Sergey Mikhaylov (RUS)

4 February 2010
20:45

Report

Maroussi Athens (Greece)	80–78	(Greece) Panathinaikos Athens
Scoring by quarter: 21-21, 16-19, 18-17, 25-21
Pts: Keys 17; Rebs: Homan 7 Asts: Keys 5		Pts: Peković 19; Rebs: Batiste 7 Asts: Spanoulis 6

Olympic Indoor Hall
Attendance: 5,700
Referees: Juan Carlos Mitjana (ESP), Milivoje Jovčić (SRB), Vicente Bulto (ESP)

=== Game 3 ===
11 February 2010
18:45

Report

Maroussi Athens (Greece)	57–49	(Serbia) Partizan Belgrade
Scoring by quarter: 20-7, 2-11, 22-19, 13-12
Pts: Lucas 15; Rebs: Homan 9 Asts: Keys, Lucas 4		Pts: Vraneš 12; Rebs: Vraneš 11; Asts: Roberts 3

Olympic Indoor Hall
Attendance: 3,000
Referees: José Ramón García Ortez (ESP), Sasa Pukl (SLO), Luís Lopes (POR)

11 February 2010
20:45

Report

Regal FC Barcelona (Spain)	83–71	(Greece) Panathinaikos Athens
Scoring by quarter: 29-18, 18-20, 21-16, 15-17
Pts: Grimau 17; Rebs: Grimau 6 Asts: Navarro 5		Pts: Batiste 19; Rebs: Batiste 7 Asts: Nicholas 5

Palau Blaugrana
Attendance: 7,093
Referees: Guerrino Cerebuch (ITA), Gianpaolo Cicoria (ITA), David Chambon (FRA)

=== Game 4 ===
25 February 2010
20:45

Report

Partizan Belgrade (Serbia)	79–76	(Greece) Maroussi Athens
Scoring by quarter: 21-24, 19-21, 18-11, 21-20
Pts: McCalebb 20; Rebs: Roberts 9 Asts: McCalebb 4		Pts: Pelekanos 19; Rebs: Pelekanos, Homan 6 Asts: Keys, Gordon 5

Pionir Hall
Attendance: 7,718
Referees: Carl Ungebrand (FIN), Nicola Maestre (FRA), Gianluca Mattioli (ITA)

25 February 2010
21:00

Report

Panathinaikos Athens (Greece)	67–70	(Spain) Regal FC Barcelona
Scoring by quarter: 20-16, 17-17, 18-11, 12-26
Pts: Peković 20; Rebs: Batiste, Fotsis 6 Asts: Diamantidis, Nicholas 5		Pts: Navarro 15; Rebs: Lorbek 10; Asts: Lakovič 5

Olympic Indoor Hall
Attendance: 12,000
Referees: Romualdas Brazkauskas (LTU), Paolo Taurino (ITA), Olegs Latisevs (LAT)

=== Game 5 ===
3 March 2010
19:15

Report

Maroussi Athens (Greece)	58–85	(Spain) Regal FC Barcelona
Scoring by quarter: 20-18, 15-24, 3-17, 20-26
Pts: Keys 12; Rebs: Lucas 8 Asts: Pelekanos, Lucas 3		Pts: Lorbek 14; Rebs: Mickeal 10; Asts: Lakovič 4

Olympic Indoor Hall
Attendance: 5,800
Referees: Shmuel Bachar (ISR), Zoran Sutulović (MNE), Tolga Sahin (TUR)

4 March 2010
20:45

Report

Partizan Belgrade (Serbia)	66–82	(Greece) Panathinaikos Athens
Scoring by quarter: 19-19, 13-16, 18-25, 16-22
Pts: McCalebb 22; Rebs: Marić 12; Asts: McCalebb 3		Pts: Nicholas 22; Rebs: Batiste 5 Asts: Diamantidis 4

Pionir Hall
Attendance: 8,150
Referees: Fabio Facchini (ITA), Recep Ankaralı (TUR), Robert Vyklicky (CZE)

=== Game 6 ===
11 March 2010
18:00

Report

Panathinaikos Athens (Greece)	82–79	(Greece) Maroussi Athens
Scoring by quarter: 22–20, 19–19, 20–21, 21–19
Pts: Batiste 21; Rebs: Batiste, Fotsis 8 Asts: Jasikevičius 5		Pts: Homan, Keys 13; Rebs: Kaimakoglou 6 Asts: Gordon, Keys 4

Olympic Indoor Hall
Attendance: 4,000
Referees: José Martín (ESP), Sradan Dozai (CRO), Juan Carlos García González (ESP)

11 March 2010
20:45

Report

Regal FC Barcelona (Spain)	82–64	(Serbia) Partizan Belgrade
Scoring by quarter: 22–16, 14–14, 25–12, 21–22
Pts: Navarro 18; Rebs: Mickeal 7 Asts: Rubio 6		Pts: Roberts 14; Rebs: Marić 14; Asts: Rašić 5

Palau Blaugrana
Attendance: 6,953
Referees: Christos Christodoulou (GRE), Robert Lottermoser (GER), Panagiotis Anastopoulos (GRE)
