= English cricket team against Pakistan in the UAE in 2009–10 =

Cricket matches results

England cricket team against Pakistan in UAE in 2010
	England	Pakistan
- Dates: 19 February 2010 – 20 February 2010
Captains	Paul Collingwood	Shoaib Malik

Twenty20 International series
- Results: 2-match series drawn 1–1
Most runs	Kevin Pietersen (105)	Abdul Razzaq (68)
Most wickets	Graeme Swann (5)	Yasir Arafat (4)
- Player of the series: Graeme Swann (Eng)

The England cricket team and the Pakistan cricket team played two Twenty20 Internationals on 19 February 2010 and 20 February 2010 in the UAE. The matches were played at the Dubai Sports City Cricket Stadium.

== Squads ==
England
Batsmen: Paul Collingwood (captain); Alastair Cook; Joe Denly; Eoin Morgan; Kevin Pietersen; Jonathan Trott; All-rounders: Luke Wright	Wicket-keepers: Matt Prior; Bowlers: Tim Bresnan; Stuart Broad; Liam Plunkett; Ajmal Shahzad; Ryan Sidebottom; Graeme Swann; James Tredwell

Pakistan
Batsmen: Imran Nazir; Imran Farhat; Khalid Latif; Umar Akmal; All-rounders: Shoaib Malik (captain); Fawad Alam; Shahid Afridi; Abdul Razzaq; Yasir Arafat	Wicket-keepers: Sarfraz Ahmed; Bowlers: Umar Gul; Saeed Ajmal; Wahab Riaz; Mohammad Talha

== T20I series ==
=== 1st T20I ===
19 February 2010
Scorecard

Pakistan; 129/8 (20 overs)	v	England; 130/3 (18.3 overs)
Shoaib Malik 33 (26); Graeme Swann 2/18 (3 overs)		Eoin Morgan 67* (61); Yasir Arafat 1/18 (4 overs)

England won by 7 wickets
Dubai Sports City Cricket Stadium, Dubai
Umpires: Asoka de Silva (SL) and Kumar Dharmasena (SL)
Player of the match: Eoin Morgan (Eng)

- Pakistan won the toss and elected to bat.
- Sarfraz Ahmed (Pak) made his T20I debut.

=== 2nd T20I ===
20 February 2010
Scorecard

England; 148/6 (20 overs)	v	Pakistan; 149/6 (19 overs)
Kevin Pietersen 62 (40); Yasir Arafat 3/32 (4 overs)		Abdul Razzaq 46* (18); Graeme Swann 3/14 (4 overs)

Pakistan won by 4 wickets
Dubai Sports City Cricket Stadium, Dubai
Umpires: Asoka de Silva (SL) and Enamul Haque (Ban)
Player of the match: Abdul Razzaq (Pak)

- Pakistan won the toss and chose to field.
- Ajmal Shahzad (Eng) made his T20I debut.
