= List of Masters Water Ski Tournament champions =

The Masters Water Ski Tournament is an annual invitational water ski competition, taking place each year on Memorial Day weekend at Callaway Gardens, just outside of Pine Mountain, Georgia. The inaugural tournament took place in 1959, with Joe Cash and Nancie Rideout winning the overall event.

== Champions ==
Year	Tournament	Slalom	Trick	Jump	Overall
1959	1st	n/a			Joe Cash
1959	1st	n/a			Nancie Rideout
1960	2nd	Joe Cash	Geoff Wolfe	Penny L. Baker (WR)	Chuck Stearns
1960	2nd	Barbara Cooper	Norine Bardill	Barbara Cooper	Janelle Kirtley
1961	3rd	W. Witherell	Geoff Wolfe	Larry Penacho	Chuck Stearns
1961	3rd	Jenny Hodges	Norine Bardill	Judy Rosch	Norine Bardill
1962	4th	Joe Cash	Chuck Stearns	Jimmy Jackson	Larry Penacho
1962	4th	Jenny Hodges	Norine Bardill	Barbara Cooper	Jenny Hodges
1963	5th	Billy Spencer	Al Tyll	Jimmy Jackson	Chuck Stearns
1963	5th	Jenny Hodges	Nancy Schniering	Jeanette Brown	Jeanette Brown
1964	6th	Billy Spencer	Joe Cash	Joker Osborn	Joker Osborn
1964	6th	Janelle Kirtley	Dixie Ann Hoyt	Barbara Cooper	Dixie Ann Hoyt
1965	7th	Joker Osborn	Al Tyll	Larry Penacho	Chuck Stearns
1965	7th	Barbara Cooper	Barbara Cooper	Barbara Cooper	Barbara Cooper
1966	8th	Leroy Burnette	Rick McCormick	Jimmy Jackson	Roland Hillier
1966	8th	Barbara Cooper	Christy Weir	Liz Allan	Liz Allan
1967	9th	Kris LaPoint	Alan Kempton	Mike Suyderhoud	Alan Kempton
1967	9th	Liz Allan	Christy Weir	Liz Allan	Liz Allan
1968	10th	Kris LaPoint	Alan Kempton	Mike Suyderhoud	Frankie Dees
1968	10th	Liz Allan	Liz Allan	Liz Allan	Liz Allan
1969	11th	Frankie Dees	Rick McCormick	Mike Suyderhoud	Alan Kempton
1969	11th	S.S. Shackleford	Liz Allan	Liz Allan	Liz Allan
1970	12th	Kris LaPoint	Rick McCormick	Rick McCormick	Rick McCormick
1970	12th	Christy Weir	Liz Allan	Liz Allan	Liz Allan
1971	13th	Kris LaPoint	Wayne Grimditch	Mike Suyderhoud	Rick McCormick
1971	13th	Christy Weir	Christy Weir	Barbara Cooper	Christy Weir
1972	14th	Kris LaPoint	Rick McCormick	Wayne Grimditch	Wayne Grimditch
1972	14th	Lisa St. John	Barbara Cleveland	Linda Leavongood	Liz Allan
1973	15th	Kris LaPoint	Tony Krupa	Rick McCormick	Mike Suyderhoud
1973	15th	Liz Allan	Barbara Cleveland	Liz Allan	Liz Allan
1974	16th	Mark Crone	Rick McCormick	Wayne Grimditch	George Athans
1974	16th	Liz Allan	Maria Victoria Carrasco	Linda Giddens	Liz Allan
1975	17th	Bob LaPoint	Rick McCormick	Wayne Grimditch	Rick McCormick
1975	17th	Liz Allan	Maria Victoria Carrasco	Liz Allan	Liz Allan
1976	18th	Bob LaPoint	Carlos Suarez	Wayne Grimditch	Carlos Suarez
1976	18th	Cindy Todd	Camille Duvall	Linda Giddens	Cindy Todd
1977	19th	Kris LaPoint	Rick McCormick	Mike Hazelwood	Rick McCormick
1977	19th	Trudi Speak	Maria Victoria Carrasco	Linda Giddens	Cindy Todd
1978	20th	Mike Hazelwood	Patrice Martin	Lucky Lowe	Mike Hazelwood
1978	20th	Pat Messner	Pam Folsom	Deena Brush	Cindy Todd
1979	21st	Mike Hazelwood	Carlos Suarez	Sammy Duvall	Mike Hazelwood
1979	21st	Deena Brush	Karin Roberge	Deena Brush	Karin Roberge
1980	22nd	Bob LaPoint	Cory Pickos	Sammy Duvall	Mike Hazelwood
1980	22nd	Karin Roberge	Ana Maria Carrasco	Linda Giddens	Karin Roberge
1981	23rd	Carl Roberge	Cory Pickos	Mike Hazelwood	Mike Hazelwood
1981	23rd	Cindy Todd	Ana Maria Carrasco	Linda Giddens	Judy McClintock
1982	24th	Bob LaPoint	Sammy Duvall	Sammy Duvall	Sammy Duvall
1982	24th	Cindy Todd	Anita Carlmann	Cindy Todd	Cindy Todd
1983	25th	Bob LaPoint	Cory Pickos	Glenn Thurlow	Carl Roberge
1983	25th	Deena Brush	Ana Maria Carrasco	Camille Duvall	Deena Brush
1984	26th	Andy Mapple	Sammy Duvall	Mike Hazelwood	Sammy Duvall
1984	26th	Camille Duvall	Karin Roberge	Sue Lipplegoes	Ana Maria Carrasco
1985	27th	Andy Mapple	Sammy Duvall	Mike Hazelwood	Sammy Duvall
1985	27th	Deena Brush	Kristi Overton	Karen Morse	Deena Brush
1986	28th	Andy Mapple	Cory Pickos	Mike Hazelwood	Patrice Martin
1986	28th	Camille Duvall	Kristi Overton	Deena Brush	Deena Brush
1987	29th	Andy Mapple	Cory Pickos	Mike Hazelwood	Carl Roberge
1987	29th	Camille Duvall	Judy McClintock	Deena Brush	Deena Brush
1988	30th	Andy Mapple	Patrice Martin	Sammy Duvall	Sammy Duvall
1988	30th	Susi Graham	Judy McClintock	Deena Brush	Deena Brush
1989	31st	Mike Kjellander	Patrice Martin	Sammy Duvall	Carl Roberge
1989	31st	Helena Kjellander	Tawn Larsen	Deena Brush	Karen Neville
1990	32nd	Andy Mapple	Tory Baggiano	Bruce Neville	Mike Neville
1990	32nd	Susi Graham	Tawn Larsen	Deena Brush	Deena Brush
1991		NO MASTERS HELD			
1992	33rd	Andy Mapple	Kreg Llewellyn	Sammy Duvall	Jaret Llewellyn
1992	33rd	Kristi Overton	Tawn Larsen	Deena Brush Mapple	Deena Brush Mapple
1993	34th	Mike Kjellander	Tory Baggiano	Bruce Neville	Jaret Llewellyn
1993	34th	Helena Kjellander	Britt Larsen	Deena Brush Mapple	Deena Brush Mapple
1994	35th	Andy Mapple	Tory Baggiano	Carl Roberge	Patrice Martin
1994	35th	Kristi Overton	Britt Larsen	Emma Sheers	Rhoni Barton
1995	36th	Wade Cox	Cory Pickos	Carl Roberge	Patrice Martin
1995	36th	Kristi Overton	Britt Larsen	Sheri Slone	Phillipa Roberts
1996	37th	Wade Cox	Nicolas LeForestier	Carl Roberge	Jaret Llewellyn
1996	37th	Kristi Overton Johnson	Tawn Larsen	Toni Neville	Rhoni Barton
1997	38th	Andy Mapple	Nicolas LeForestier	Carl Roberge	Patrice Martin
1997	38th	Susi Graham	Tawn Larsen Hahn	Brenda Baldwin	April Coble
1998	39th	Andy Mapple	Cory Pickos	Jaret Llewellyn / Scot Ellis (ski fly)	Patrice Martin
1998	39th	Susi Graham	Marina Mosti	Elena Milakova	Brandi Hunt
1999	40th	Andy Mapple	Nicolas LeForestier	Freddy Krueger (ski fly)	Jaret Llewellyn
1999	40th	Susi Graham	Tawn Larsen Hahn	Elena Milakova	Elena Milakova
2000	41st	Andy Mapple	Cory Pickos	Freddy Krueger (ski fly)	Jaret Llewellyn
2000	41st	Kristi Overton Johnson	Tawn Larsen Hahn	Emma Sheers	Sarah Gatty Saunt
2001	42nd	Andy Mapple	Nicolas LeForestier	Freddy Krueger (ski fly)	n/a
2001	42nd	Toni Neville	Elena Milakova	Emma Sheers (ski fly)	n/a
2002	43rd	Chris Parrish	Nicolas LeForestier	Jaret Llewellyn (ski fly)	n/a
2002	43rd	Kristi Overton Johnson	Elena Milakova	Elena Milakova (ski fly)	n/a
2003	44th	Andy Mapple	Nicolas LeForestier	Jaret Llewellyn (ski fly)	n/a
2003	44th	Emma Sheers	Mandy Nightingale	Emma Sheers (ski fly)	n/a
2004	45th	Jamie Beauchesne	Nicolas LeForestier	Jaret Llewellyn (ski fly)	n/a
2004	45th	Emma Sheers	Brigitte Lethem	Emma Sheers	n/a
2005	46th	Chris Parrish	Nicolas LeForestier	Freddy Krueger	n/a
2005	46th	Karin Truelove	Mandy Nightingale	Emma Sheers	n/a
2006	47th	William Asher	Jimmy Siemers	Freddy Krueger	n/a
2006	47th	Sarah Green	Clementine Lucine	June Fladborg	n/a
2007	48th	Jamie Beauchesne	Nicolas LeForestier	Freddy Krueger	n/a
2007	48th	Sarah Green	Michale Briant	Natalia Berdnikava	n/a
2008	49th	William Asher	Jimmy Siemers	Freddy Krueger	n/a
2008	49th	Regina Jaquess	Natalia Berdnikava	June Fladborg	n/a
2009	50th	William Asher	Jimmy Siemers	Freddy Krueger	n/a
2009	50th	Karina Nowlan	Whitney McClintock	June Fladborg	n/a
2010	51st	William Asher	Herman Beliakou	Freddy Krueger	n/a
2010	51st	Regina Jaquess	Whitney McClintock	June Fladborg	n/a
2011	52nd	Jonathan Travers	Jimmy Siemers	Freddy Krueger	n/a
2011	52nd	Karina Nowlan	Whitney McClintock	Natalia Berdnikava	n/a
2012	53rd	Nate Smith	Alexandre Poteau	Ryan Dodd	n/a
2012	53rd	Regina Jaquess	Natalia Berdnikava	Natalia Berdnikava	n/a
2013	54th	William Asher	Aliaksei Zharnasek	Freddy Krueger	n/a
2013	54th	Regina Jaquess	Iris Cambray	Jacinta Carroll	n/a
2014	55th	Thomas Degasperi	Pierre Ballon	Ryan Dodd	n/a
2014	55th	Regina Jaquess	Erika Lang	Jacinta Carroll	n/a
2015	56th	Nate Smith	Pierre Ballon	Ryan Dodd	n/a
2015	56th	Regina Jaquess	Erika Lang	Jacinta Carroll	n/a
2016	57th	Nate Smith	Aliaksei Zharnasek	Freddy Krueger	n/a
2016	57th	Regina Jaquess	Anna Gay	Jacinta Carroll	n/a
2017	58th	Nate Smith	Aliaksei Zharnasek	Ryan Dodd	n/a
2017	58th	Whitney McClintock	Neilly Ross	Jacinta Carroll	n/a
2018	59th	Nate Smith	Aliaksei Zharnasek	Freddy Krueger	n/a
2018	59th	Manon Costard	Neilly Ross	Jacinta Carroll	n/a
2019	60th	Freddie Winter	Patricio Font	Ryan Dodd	n/a
2019	60th	Regina Jaquess	Erika Lang	Jacinta Carroll	n/a
2020		Not held due to COVID-19 pandemic			
2021	61st	Freddie Winter	Patricio Font	Freddy Krueger	n/a
2021	61st	Jaimee Bull	Anna Gay	Hanna Straltsova	n/a
2022	62nd	Nate Smith	Patricio Font	Joel Poland	n/a
2022	62nd	Regina Jaquess	Erika Lang	Lauren Morgan	n/a
2023	63rd	Nate Smith	Patricio Font	Ryan Dodd	n/a
2023	63rd	Regina Jaquess	Erika Lang	Hanna Straltsova	n/a
2024	64th	Cole McCormick	Martin Labra	Joel Poland	n/a
2024	64th	Regina Jaquess	Anna Gay Hunter	Hanna Straltsova	n/a
2025	65th	Freddie Winter	Jake Abelson	Joel Poland	n/a
2025	65th	Allie Nicholson	Erika Lang	Hanna Straltsova	n/a
2026	66th	Freddie Winter	Jake Abelson	Joel Poland	n/a
2026	66th	Regina Jaquess	Erika Lang	Sasha Danisheuskaya	n/a
