= List of Moomba Masters champions =

The Moomba Masters International Invitational is a water ski and wakeboard tournament occurring during the Moomba Festival since 1961.

== Results ==
| Year | Tournament | Slalom | Trick | Jump | Overall |
|---|---|---|---|---|---|
| 1961 | 3rd | Wally Morris | Ron Marks | Kevin Birmingham | Wally Morris |
| 1961 | 3rd | Rosemary Margan | Peggy Caddy | R. Courtenay | Rosemary Margan |
| 1962 | 4th | Colin Birmingham | Colin Birmingham | Colin Birmingham | Colin Birmingham |
| 1962 | 4th | Rosemary Margan | [?] | [?] | Peggy Caddy |
| 1963 | 5th | Ron Marks | Ron Marks | Jimmy Jackson | Chuck Stearns |
| 1963 | 5th | Peggy Caddy | Margaret Calvert | Margaret Calvert | Margaret Calvert |
| 1964 | No Moomba Held (Australian National Water Ski Championships) | | | | |
| 1965 | 6th | Rohan Shorland | Ron Marks | Colin Faulkner | Rohan Shorland |
| 1965 | 6th | Margaret Calvert | Margaret Calvert | Margaret Calvert | Margaret Calvert |
| 1966 | 7th | Chuck Stearns | Tito Antunano | Chuck Stearns | Chuck Stearns |
| 1966 | 7th | May Ward | Deidre Barnard | Deidre Barnard | Deidre Barnard |
| 1967 | 8th | Colin Faulkner | Alan Kempton | Alan Kempton | Colin Faulkner |
| 1967 | 8th | Margaret Calvert | Margaret Calvert | Margaret Calvert | Deidre Barnard |
| 1968 | 9th | Mike Suyderhoud | Alan Kempton | Mike Suyderhoud | Mike Suyderhoud |
| 1968 | 9th | May Ward | Kaye Thurlow | Deidre Barnard | Kaye Thurlow |
| 1969 | 10th | Mike Suyderhoud | Ricky McCormick | Mike Suyderhoud | Mike Suyderhoud |
| 1969 | 10th | Lesley Cockburn | Lisa St. John | Kaye Thurlow | May Ward |
| 1970 | 11th | Bruce Cockburn | Colin Faulkner | Ricky McCormick | Ricky McCormick |
| 1970 | 11th | Lisa St. John | Lisa St. John | Kaye Thurlow | Kaye Thurlow |
| 1971 | 12th | Bruce Cockburn | Bruce Cockburn | Joe Csortan | Bruce Cockburn |
| 1971 | 12th | Lisa St. John | Kaye Thurlow | Kaye Thurlow | Kaye Thurlow |
| 1972 | 13th | Bruce Cockburn | Graeme Cockburn | Wayne Grimditch | Graeme Cockburn |
| 1972 | 13th | Sue Fieldhouse | Lesley Cockburn | Kaye Thurlow | Kaye Thurlow |
| 1973 | 14th | Bruce Cockburn | George Athans | Wayne Grimditch | Wayne Grimditch |
| 1973 | 14th | Jill Halliwell | Kaye Thurlow | Kaye Thurlow | Kaye Thurlow |
| 1974 | 15th | Bruce Cockburn | Bruce Cockburn | Ricky McCormick | Ricky McCormick |
| 1974 | 15th | Lisa St. John | Kaye Thurlow Faulkner | Sue Wright | Kaye Thurlow Faulkner |
| 1975 | 16th | Graeme Cockburn | Ricky McCormick | Bruce Cockburn | Ricky McCormick |
| 1975 | 16th | Liz Allan | Kaye Thurlow Faulkner | Liz Allan | Liz Allan |
| 1976 | 17th | Glenn Thurlow | Carlos Suarez | Bruce Cockburn | Carlos Suarez |
| 1976 | 17th | Kaye Thurlow Faulkner | Lesley Cockburn | Kaye Thurlow Faulkner | Kaye Thurlow Faulkner |
| 1977 | 18th | Mike Hazelwood | Ricky McCormick | Mike Hazelwood | Mike Hazelwood |
| 1977 | 18th | Sue Fieldhouse | Lesley Cockburn | Cindy Todd | Kaye Thurlow Faulkner |
| 1978 | 19th | Mike Hazelwood | Mike Hazelwood | Bruce Cockburn | Mike Hazelwood |
| 1978 | 19th | Sue Fieldhouse | Cindy Todd | Sue Wright | Cindy Todd |
| 1979 | 20th | Bob LaPoint | Mike Hazelwood | Joel McClintock | Mike Hazelwood |
| 1979 | 20th | Sue Fieldhouse | Karen Bowkett | Sue Lipplegoes | Deena Brush |
| 1980 | 21st | Mike Hazelwood | Eddy de Telder | Mike Hazelwood | Mike Hazelwood |
| 1980 | 21st | Sue Fieldhouse | Deena Brush | Sue Lipplegoes | Deena Brush |
| 1981 | 22ndt | Carl Roberge | Mick Neville | Mike Hazelwood | Mike Hazelwood |
| 1981 | 22ndt | Sue Fieldhouse | Karen Bowkett | Sue Lipplegoes | Karin Roberge |
| 1982 | 23rd | Carl Roberge | Cory Pickos | Mike Hazelwood | Carl Roberge |
| 1982 | 23rd | Sue Fieldhouse | Ana María Carrasco | Sue Lipplegoes | Karin Roberge |
| 1983 | 24th | Craig Irons | Mick Neville | Sammy Duvall | Carl Roberge |
| 1983 | 24th | Cindy Todd | Karin Roberge | Cindy Todd | Karin Roberge |
| 1984 | 25th | Andy Mapple | Mick Neville | Glenn Thurlow | Sammy Duvall |
| 1984 | 25th | Karen Bowkett | Karen Bowkett | Deena Brush | Karen Bowkett |
| 1985 | 26th | Brett Thurley | Mick Neville | Mike Hazelwood | Sammy Duvall |
| 1985 | 26th | Karin Roberge Woodson | Karen Bowkett Neville | Sue Lipplegoes | Karen Bowkett Neville |
| 1986 | 27th | Michael Kjellander | Patrice Martin | Michael Kjellander | Sammy Duvall |
| 1986 | 27th | Kim Laskoff | Karen Bowkett Neville | Sue Lipplegoes | Karen Bowkett Neville |
| 1987 | 28th | Andy Mapple | Mick Neville | Carl Roberge | Carl Roberge |
| 1987 | 28th | Kim Laskoff | Karen Bowkett Neville | Sue Lipplegoes | Deena Brush |
| 1988 | 29th | Michael Kjellander | Kreg Llewellyn | Glenn Thurlow | Michael Kjellander |
| 1988 | 29th | Karen Morse | Jodie Skipper | Deena Mapple | Karen Bowkett Neville |
| 1989 | 30th | Mick Neville | Mick Neville | Bruce Neville | Mick Neville |
| 1989 | 30th | Karen Bowkett Neville | Karen Bowkett Neville | Lisa Simoneau | Karen Bowkett Neville |
| 1990 | 31st | Andy Mapple | Mick Neville | Geoff Carrington | Sammy Duvall |
| 1990 | 31st | Deena Mapple | Karen Bowkett Neville | Deena Mapple | Karen Bowkett Neville |
| 1991 | 32nd | Andy Mapple | Bruce Neville | Bruce Neville | Bruce Neville |
| 1991 | 32nd | Toni Neville | Natalia Rumjantseva | Karen Bowkett Neville | Karen Bowkett Neville |
| 1992 | 33rd | Michael Kjellander | Kreg Llewellyn | Jim Clunie | Bruce Neville |
| 1992 | 33rd | Cassie Johnson | Kim Neville | Jodie Skipper | Jodie Skipper |
| 1993 | 34th | Andy Mapple | Andrea Alessi | Bruce Neville | Bruce Neville |
| 1993 | 34th | Cassie Johnson | Karen Bowkett Neville | Emma Sheers | Karen Bowkett Neville |
| 1994 | 35th | Andy Mapple | Jaret Llewellyn | Jaret Llewellyn | Bruce Neville |
| 1994 | 35th | Helena Kjellander | Britt Larsen | Emma Sheers | Kim de Macedo |
| 1995 | 36th | Brett Thurley | Nicolas le Forestier | Jim Clunie | Bruce Neville |
| 1995 | 36th | Sarah Gatty Saunt | Kim de Macedo | Emma Sheers | Kim de Macedo |
| 1996 | 37th | Andy Mapple | Patrice Martin | Carl Roberge/ Jim Clunie (World Cup) | Jaret Llewellyn |
| 1996 | 37th | Kristi Overton Johnson | Marina Mosti | Emma Sheers/ Emma Sheers (World Cup) | April Coble |
| 1997 | 38th | [?]/ Andy Mapple (World Cup) | [?] | Scot Ellis/ Scot Ellis (World Cup) | [?] |
| 1997 | 38th | [?]/ Kristi Overton Johnson (World Cup) | [?] | [?]/ Emma Sheers (World Cup) | [?] |
| 1998 | 39th | Patrice Martin/ Andy Mapple (World Cup) | Patrice Martin | Jaret Llewellyn/ Scot Ellis (World Cup) | Patrice Martin |
| 1998 | 39th | Toni Neville/ Jennifer Leachman (World Cup) | Sarah Gatty Saunt | Emmas Sheers/ Emma Sheers (World Cup) | April Coble |
| 1999 | 40th | Andy Mapple/ Andy Mapple (World Cup) | Jaret Llewellyn | Elena Milakova/ Emma Sheers (World Cup) | Jaret Llewellyn |
| 1999 | 40th | Kristi Overton-Johnson/ Emma Sheers (World Cup) | Rhoni Barton | Scot Ellis/ Scot Ellis (World Cup) | Rhoni Barton |
| 2000 | 41st | Chris Parrish | Ryan Green | Jaret Llewellyn | Jaret Llewellyn |
| 2000 | 41st | Geraldine Jamin | Sarah Gatty Saunt | Emma Sheers | Marina Mosti |
| 2001 | 42nd | Andy Mapple | Nicolas LeForestier | Jaret Llewellyn | n/a |
| 2001 | 42nd | Sarah Gatty Saunt | Cathryn Humphrey | Emma Sheers | n/a |
| 2002 | 43rd | Andy Mapple | Nicolas LeForestier | Jaret Llewellyn | n/a |
| 2002 | 43rd | Karen Truelove | Rhoni Barton | Emma Sheers | n/a |
| 2003 | 44th | Jodi Fisher | Nicolas LeForestier | Jesper Cassoe | n/a |
| 2003 | 44th | Emma Sheers | Regina Jaquess | Emma Sheers | n/a |
| 2004 | 45th | Andy Mapple | Jaret Llewellyn | Freddy Krueger | n/a |
| 2004 | 45th | Karen Truelove | Mandy Nightingale | Emma Sheers | n/a |
| 2005 | 46th | Marcus Brown | Jaret Llewellyn | Freddy Krueger | n/a |
| 2005 | 46th | Emma Sheers | Angeliki Andriopoulou | Emma Sheers | n/a |
| 2006 | No Moomba Held (Commonwealth Games) | | | | |
| 2007 | 47th | Jodi Fisher | Javier Julio | Freddy Krueger | n/a |
| 2007 | 47th | Karen Truelove | Michale Briant | Angeliki Andriopoulou | n/a |
| 2008 | 48th | Chris Parrish | Aliaksei Zharnasek | Jaret Llewellyn | n/a |
| 2008 | 48th | Emma Sheers | Michale Briant | June Fladborg | n/a |
| 2009 | 49th | Chris Parrish | Aliaksei Zharnasek | Jaret Llewellyn | n/a |
| 2009 | 49th | Anais Amade | Clementine Lucine | June Fladborg | n/a |
| 2010 | 50th | Aaron Larkin | Adam Sedlmajer | Damien Sharman | n/a |
| 2010 | 50th | Cathryn Humphry | Natallia Berdnikava | Natallia Berdnikava | n/a |
| 2011 | 51st | Aaron Larkin | Jimmy Siemers | Ryan Dodd | n/a |
| 2011 | 51st | Karen Truelove | Natallia Berdnikava | Jacinta Carroll | n/a |
| 2012 | 52nd | Nate Smith | Aliaksei Zharnasek | Tim Bradstreet | n/a |
| 2012 | 52nd | Whitney McClintock Rini | Whitney McClintock Rini | Natallia Berdnikava | n/a |
| 2013 | 53rd | Chris Parrish | Herman Beliakou | Freddy Krueger | n/a |
| 2013 | 53rd | Whitney McClintock Rini | Erika Lang | Jutta Lammi | n/a |
| 2014 | 54th | Thomas Degasperi | Josh Briant | Freddy Krueger | n/a |
| 2014 | 54th | Whitney McClintock Rini | Erika Lang | Jacinta Carroll | n/a |
| 2015 | 55th | Nate Smith | Aliaksei Zharnasek | Freddy Krueger | n/a |
| 2015 | 55th | Whitney McClintock Rini | Natallia Berdnikava | Jacinta Carroll | n/a |
| 2016 | 56th | William Asher | Aliaksei Zharnasek | Bojan Schipner | n/a |
| 2016 | 56th | Whitney McClintock Rini | Anna Gay | Jacinta Carroll | n/a |
| 2017 | 57th | Thomas Degasperi | Franck Desboyaux | Freddy Krueger | n/a |
| 2017 | 57th | Whitney McClintock Rini | Neilly Ross | Jacinta Carroll | n/a |
| 2018 | 58th | Nate Smith | Jimmy Siemers | Ryan Dodd | n/a |
| 2018 | 58th | Whitney McClintock Rini | Erika Lang | Jacinta Carroll | n/a |
| 2019 | 59th | Thomas Degasperi | Martin Kolman | Freddy Krueger | n/a |
| 2019 | 59th | Whitney McClintock Rini | Anna Gay | Jacinta Carroll | n/a |
| 2020 | 60th | Nate Smith | Patricio Font | Freddy Krueger | n/a |
| 2020 | 60th | Manon Costard | Erika Lang | Jacinta Carroll | n/a |
| 2021 | No Moomba Held (Covid Pandemic) | | | | |
| 2022 | 61st | Nate Smith | Patricio Font | Ryan Dodd | n/a |
| 2022 | 61st | Vennesa Vieke | Neilly Ross | Jacinta Carroll | n/a |
| 2023 | 62nd | Nate Smith | Dorien Llewellyn | Ryan Dodd | n/a |
| 2023 | 62nd | Whitney McClintock Rini | Erika Lang | Jacinta Carroll | n/a |
| 2024 | 63rd | Freddie Winter | Patricio Font | Ryan Dodd | n/a |
| 2024 | 63rd | Regina Jaquess | Erika Lang | Jacinta Carroll | n/a |
