= U.S. Professional Water Ski Tour =

Annual series of water ski tournaments in the U.S.

- Sport: Water Skiing
- Founder: Rob Shirley
- First season: 1984
- Folded: 2002
- Organising body: International Water Ski Tour, Inc., World Water Ski Tour, World Sports & Marketing
- Country: United States, Canada
- Most titles: Tour champion: 11: (United Kingdom) Andy Mapple; Tournament wins: 65: (United Kingdom) Andy Mapple
- Broadcasters: ESPN, USA Network
- Sponsors: Coors Light, Anheuser-Busch, MasterCraft, Ski Supreme, Ford, Yamaha, Café de Colombia, Sea-Doo, Rogaine

The U.S. Professional Water Ski Tour (also known as the Coors Light, Michelob Dry, Bud, and Budweiser Water Ski Tour) was an annual standardized series of professional water ski tournaments held across the United States and Canada. The tour began in 1984. Tour stops were typically held on public water in metropolitan areas designed to draw large crowds and were televised on cable networks such as ESPN. The tour ceased in 2002.

== History ==
International Water Ski Tour, Inc. (IWST) was formed by Rob Shirley, CEO and founder of MasterCraft, in 1984 with major sponsorship from Coors Light, MasterCraft, and Ski Supreme. The Tour's inaugural season had seven stops across the United States and featured men's and women's slalom, men's jumping, and men's freestyle.

After the inaugural season Shirley sold the tour to G.H. "Bud" Massey, previously the publisher of Spray Magazine. However, under Massey's management IWST experienced significant financial difficulties, culminating in skier's prize money checks bouncing after the 1985 Shreveport, LA stop, which resulted in Shirley personally bailing out IWST and resuming management for the final stop in Indianapolis, IN.

The next year, management of the tour was taken over by Rich Schultz, who had previously worked on promoting bass fishing events and saw water skiing as a marketable sport with an opportunity to reach a wider audience. Schultz moved the IWST offices to Mesa, AZ. Later, for the 1987 season, women's jump was added for the first time.

in 1989, World Publications, the parent company of Water Ski Magazine, took over the management of the tour, under a corporation called World Water Ski Tour. However, dissatisfaction with tour organization, prize money, and the sometimes dangerous conditions of tour events led a group of competitors, headed by Camille Duvall, to form the Professional Association of Water Skiers (PAWS) and establish a rival tour in 1990. Their initial press release promised a worldwide tour of 19 events with $100,000 in prize money at each event. Meanwhile, the World Water Ski Tour switched its naming right sponsor from Coors Light to Michelob Dry as the two tours competed for tournament dates and sites. The PAWS tour was discontinued the following year, after they were only able to organize a few televised amateur events.

The popularity of the new sport of wakeboarding coupled with financial constraints resulted in women's jump being dropped from the tour in favor of wakeboarding in 1992. The same year, Anheuser-Busch, the major sponsor of the tour, switched the naming right brand from Michelob Dry to the Bud Water Ski Tour.

in 1996, Anheuser-Busch pulled sponsorship of the tour and the loss of funding resulted in women's slalom, men's freestyle, and kneeboarding being dropped from the tour. World Sports & Marketing, the organizing arm of the tour, secured Café de Colombia and Sea-Doo as the major sponsors of water skiing and wakeboarding respectively. The existing series of domestic tour stops, referred to as the U.S. Pro Tour, were combined with international events, such as the Moomba Masters, to form the Café de Colombia Water Ski World Cup.

Although women's slalom and jump were included in most of the international events in the World Cup from 1997 to 1999, women's skiing was not included in any U.S. Pro Tour events. An organization headed by Jennifer Leachman and Sherri Slone, Women Of Waterskiing (WOW), established a rival tour of female only tournaments in 1997. The WOW Tour found success on Fox Sports packaged as the 30 minute TV show Curves, showcasing tournament highlights and behind the scenes footage of the athletes.

Café de Colombia pulled sponsorship after the 1999 season, spelling the end of the international World Cup format. Many of the international events continued as stand alone tournaments. Domestically, the U.S. Pro Water Ski and Wakeboard Tour continued in 2000 and 2001 with no title sponsor, with both women's slalom and jump included on the tour for the first time since 1995.

In 2002, the economic downturn resulted in the tour, rebranded as the MasterCraft PT02 Pro Wakeboard Tour, being downsized to six events, with five of the six events featuring wakeboarding only, and just one event, the inaugural MasterCraft Pro Water Ski Championships, including slalom or jump. This effectively marked the end of an organized professional tour in the United States.

Since the tour ended professional water ski tournaments have continued as loosely affiliated stand-alone events. The International Waterski & Wakeboard Federation (IWWF) created an elite ranking list in 2003 that assigned points based on professional victories. The elite ranking list was replaced by the Waterski Pro Tour in 2021.

== Season Champions ==
Year	Tour Name	Men's Slalom	Women's Slalom	Men's Jump	Women's Jump
1984	Coors Light Series of Water Skiing	Bob LaPoint	Camille Duvall	Mike Hazelwood	n/a
1985	Coors Light International Water Ski Tour	Michael Kjellander	Camille Duvall	Sammy Duvall	n/a
1986	Coors Light Water Ski Tour	Carl Roberge	Camille Duvall	Mike Hazelwood	n/a
1987	Coors Light Water Ski Tour	Andy Mapple	Camille Duvall	Mike Hazelwood	Deena Brush
1988	Coors Light Water Ski Tour	Michael Kjellander	Camille Duvall	Sammy Duvall	Deena Mapple
1989	Coors Light Water Ski Tour	Andy Mapple	Susi Graham	Sammy Duvall	Deena Mapple
1990	Michelob Dry Waterski Tour	Michael Kjellander	Helena Kjellander	Scot Ellis	Sherri Slone
1991	Michelob Dry Waterski Tour	Andy Mapple	Jennifer Leachman	Sammy Duvall	Sherri Slone
1992	Bud Waterski Tour	Andy Mapple	Kristi Overton	Sammy Duvall	n/a
1993	Bud Waterski Tour	Andy Mapple	Susi Graham	Bruce Neville	n/a
1994	Budweiser Water Ski Tour	Andy Mapple	Kristi Overton	Sammy Duvall	n/a
1995	Budweiser Water Ski Tour	Wade Cox	Kristi Overton	Carl Roberge	n/a
1996	Café de Columbia World Cup	Wade Cox	n/a	Carl Roberge	n/a
1997	Café de Columbia World Cup	Andy Mapple	n/a	Bruce Neville	n/a
1998	Café de Columbia World Cup	Andy Mapple	n/a	Jaret Llewellyn	n/a
1999	Café de Columbia World Cup	Andy Mapple	n/a	Jaret Llewellyn	n/a
2000	U.S Pro Water Ski and Wakeboard Tour	Andy Mapple	Kristi Overton-Johnson	Freddy Krueger	Emma Sheers
2001	U.S Pro Water Ski and Wakeboard Tour	Andy Mapple	Kristi Overton-Johnson	Jaret Llewellyn	Emma Sheers

== Tour Stop Champions ==
Year	Location	Date	Men's Slalom	Women's Slalom	Men's Jump	Women's Jump
1984	West Palm Beach, FL	May 5–6	Bob LaPoint	Deena Brush	Sammy Duvall	N/A
1984	Orlando, FL	May 19–20	Bob LaPoint	Camille Duvall	Sammy Duvall	N/A
1984	Redwood City, CA	June 2–3	Kris LaPoint	Deena Brush	Mike Hazelwood	N/A
1984	Birmingham, AL	July 21–22	Bob LaPoint	Camille Duvall	Mike Hazelwood	N/A
1984	Shreveport, LA	August 4–5	Bob LaPoint	Camille Duvall	Mike Hazelwood	N/A
1984	Somerset, KY	August 25–26	Bob LaPoint	Deena Brush	Mike Hazelwood	N/A
1984	Atlanta, GA	September 8–9	Bob LaPoint	Camille Duvall	Mike Hazelwood	N/A
1985	Orlando, FL	April 20–21	Bob LaPoint	Karin Roberge	Sammy Duvall	N/A
1985	Atlanta, GA	May 11–12	Michael Kjellander	Camille Duvall	Franz Oberleitner	N/A
1985	West Palm Beach, FL	May 18–19	Michael Kjellander	Deena Brush	Mike Hazelwood	N/A
1985	Phoenix, AZ	May 25–26	Andy Mapple	Susi Graham	Mike Hazelwood	N/A
1985	Redwood City, CA	June 1–2	Bob LaPoint	Susi Graham	Lucky Lowe	N/A
1985	Somerset, KY	June 29–30	Andy Mapple	Karin Roberge	Mike Hazelwood	N/A
1985	Dayton, OH	July 6–7	Michael Kjellander	Camille Duvall	Sammy Duvall	N/A
1985	Birmingham, AL	July 20–21	Michael Kjellander	Camille Duvall	Lucky Lowe	N/A
1985	Shreveport, LA	August 3–4	Michael Kjellander	Camille Duvall	Sammy Duvall	N/A
1985	Indianapolis, IN	August 24–25	Michael Kjellander	Camille Duvall	Mike Hazelwood	N/A
1986	Orlando, FL	April 26–27	Michael Kjellander	Camille Duvall	Mike Hazelwood	N/A
1986	Atlanta, GA	May 10–11	Carl Roberge	Camille Duvall	Sammy Duvall	N/A
1986	Madison, WI	June 7–8	Bob LaPoint	Jennifer Leachman	Mike Hazelwood	N/A
1986	Birmingham, AL	June 28–29	Carl Roberge	Deena Brush	Mike Hazelwood	N/A
1986	Wichita, KS	July 19–20	Mike Morgan	Camille Duvall	Carl Roberge	N/A
1986	Shreveport, LA	July 26–27	Mike Morgan	Camille Duvall	Sammy Duvall	N/A
1986	Houston, TX	August 9–10	Andy Mapple	Deena Brush	Sammy Duvall	N/A
1986	Indianapolis, IN	August 23–34	Michael Kjellander	Deena Brush	Mike Hazelwood	N/A
1987	Orlando, FL	April 11–12	Andy Mapple	Camille Duvall	Carl Roberge	Camille Duvall
1987	Augusta, GA	May 16–17	Andy Mapple	Camille Duvall	Glenn Thurlow	Deena Brush
1987	Houston, TX	May 30–31	Carl Roberge	Deena Brush	Sammy Duvall	Deena Brush
1987	Vallejo, CA	June 6–7	Bob LaPoint	Camille Duvall	Mike Hazelwood	Deena Brush
1987	Knoxville, TN	June 13–14	Andy Mapple	Camille Duvall	Sammy Duvall	Deena Brush
1987	Chattanooga, TN	June 20–21	Andy Mapple	Jennifer Leachman	[?]	[?]
1987	Madison, WI	June 27–28	Andy Mapple	Deena Brush	Mike Hazelwood	Deena Brush
1987	Lansing, MI	July 11–12	Andy Mapple	Camille Duvall	Mike Hazelwood	Deena Brush
1987	Wichita, KS	July 18–19	Geoff Carrington	Joy Kelley	n/a	
1987	Shreveport, LA	July 25–26	Michael Kjellander	Camille Duvall	Carl Roberge	Deena Brush
1987	Thompson Lake, OK	August 8–9	Michael Kjellander	Deena Brush	Sammy Duvall	Camille Duvall
1987	St. Paul, MN	August 22–23	Kris LaPoint	Jennifer Leachman	Mike Hazelwood	Deena Brush
1988	Orlando, FL	April 16–17	Andy Mapple	Susi Graham	Sammy Duvall	Deena Mapple
1988	Vallejo, CA	June 4–5	Michael Kjellander	Susi Graham	Sammy Duvall	Deena Mapple
1988	Madison, WI	June 11	Brett Thurley	Jennifer Leachman	Sammy Duvall	Deena Mapple
1988	Knoxville, TN	June 18–19	Michael Kjellander	Cindy Todd	Sammy Duvall	Deena Mapple
1988	Syracuse, NY	June 25–26	n/a			
1988	Lansing, MI	July 9–10	Michael Kjellander	Jennifer Leachman	Sammy Duvall	Deena Mapple
1988	Thompson Lake, OK	July 16–17	Carl Roberge	Jennifer Leachman	Michael Kjellander	Deena Mapple
1988	Lincoln, NE	July 23–24	Carl Roberge	Kim Laskoff	Sammy Duvall	Deena Mapple
1988	Shreveport, LA	July 30–31	Andy Mapple	Camille Duvall	Sammy Duvall	Deena Mapple
1988	Fort Worth, TX	August 13–14	Carl Roberge	Camille Duvall	Sammy Duvall	Deena Mapple
1988	Wichita, KS	August 27–28	Carl Roberge	Camille Duvall	Geoff Carrington	Deena Mapple
1989	Orlando, FL	April 15–16	Andy Mapple	Kristi Overton	Sammy Duvall	Deena Mapple
1989	Vallejo, CA	June 3–4	Andy Mapple	Camille Duvall	Sammy Duvall	Deena Mapple
1989	Thompson Lake, OK	June 10–11	Andy Mapple	Helena Kjellander	Bruce Neville	Deena Mapple
1989	Detroit, MI	June 24–25	Bob LaPoint	Susi Graham	Michael Kjellander	Deena Mapple
1989	Fort Worth, TX	July 1–2	Andy Mapple	Kristi Overton	Sammy Duvall	Deena Mapple
1989	St. Louis, MO	July 15–16	Wade Cox	Deena Mapple	Michael Kjellander	Deena Mapple
1989	Shreveport, LA	July 22–23	Andy Mapple	Helena Kjellander	Sammy Duvall	Deena Mapple
1989	Wichita, KS	August 26–27	Carl Roberge	Susi Graham	Sammy Duvall	Deena Mapple
1990	Orlando, FL	May 4–6	Andy Mapple	Deena Mapple	Bruce Neville	Deena Mapple
1990	San Diego, CA	June 8–10	Andy Mapple	Kristi Overton	Bruce Neville	Deena Mapple
1990	Denver, CO	June 15–17	Andy Mapple	Helena Kjellander	Geoff Carrington	Deena Mapple
1990	Fort Worth, TX	June 22–24	Michael Kjellander	Kristi Overton	Scot Ellis	Sherri Slone
1990	Lansing, MI	July 6–8	Bob LaPoint	Kristi Overton	D. Jaskevitch	Sherri Slone
1990	St. Louis, MO	July 13–15	Bob LaPoint	Karen Neville	Mick Neville	Sherri Slone
1990	Wichita, KS	July 20–22	Mick Neville	Helena Kjellander	Scot Ellis	Sherri Slone
1990	San Francisco, CA	September 7–9	Andy Mapple	Deena Mapple	Scot Ellis	Joy Kelley
1991	Orlando, FL	April 13–14	Wade Cox	Kristi Overton	Bruce Neville	Sherri Slone
1991	San Diego, CA	May 18–19	Michael Kjellander	Helena Kjellander	Sammy Duvall	Karen Neville
1991	Lakewood, CO	June 8–9	Andy Mapple	[?]	Bruce Neville	[?]
1991	Fort Worth, TX	June 15–16	Carl Roberge	Helena Kjellander	Bruce Neville	Sherri Slone
1991	St. Louis, MO	June 26–30	Andy Mapple	Jennifer Leachman	Sammy Duvall	Sherri Slone
1991	Lansing, MI	July 13–14	Andy Mapple	Jennifer Leachman	Sammy Duvall	Sherri Slone
1991	Indianapolis, IN	July 20–21	Andy Mapple	Kristi Overton	Sammy Duvall	Sherri Slone
1991	St. Paul, MN	August 10–11	Andy Mapple	Jennifer Leachman	Sammy Duvall	Sherri Slone
1992	Orlando, FL	April 11–12	Andy Mapple	Susi Graham	Sammy Duvall	n/a
1992	Camden, SC	May 9–10	Jeff Rodgers	Toni Neville	Sammy Duvall	n/a
1992	San Diego, CA	May 30–31	Kris LaPoint	Jennifer Leachman	Sammy Duvall	n/a
1992	Des Plaines, IL	June 13–14	Andy Mapple	Helena Kjellander	Bruce Neville	n/a
1992	Dallas, TX	June 27–28	Wade Cox	Toni Neville	Sammy Duvall	n/a
1992	St. Louis, MO	July 11–12	Andy Mapple	Susi Graham	Bruce Neville	n/a
1992	Indianapolis, IN	July 18–19	Wade Cox	Kristi Overton	Sammy Duvall	n/a
1992	St. Paul, MN	August 1–2	Andy Mapple	Kristi Overton	Bruce Neville	n/a
1993	Orlando, FL	April 17–18	Andy Mapple	Kristi Overton	Bruce Neville	n/a
1993	Phoenix, AZ	May 1–2	Andy Mapple	Susi Graham	Bruce Neville	n/a
1993	Camden, SC	May 15–16	Andy Mapple	Susi Graham	Bruce Neville	n/a
1993	Vallejo, CA	June 5–6	Andy Mapple	Kristi Overton	Bruce Neville	n/a
1993	Des Plaines, IL	June 12–13	Andy Mapple	Deena Mapple	Scot Ellis	n/a
1993	Cypress Gardens, FL	June 26–27	Wade Cox	Helena Kjellander	Carl Roberge	n/a
1993	St. Louis, MO	July 10–11	Andy Mapple	Kristi Overton	Bruce Neville	n/a
1993	Shreveport, LA	July 17–18	Andy Mapple	Susi Graham	Scot Ellis	n/a
1993	St. Paul, MN	July 31-August 1	Wade Cox	Deena Mapple	Carl Roberge	n/a
1993	Indianapolis, IN	August 7–8	Andy Mapple	Camille Duvall	Bruce Neville	n/a
1993	Hartford, CT	August 28–29	Wade Cox	Susi Graham	Carl Roberge	n/a
1994	Orlando, FL	April 16–17	Carl Roberge	Kristi Overton	Bruce Neville	n/a
1994	Phoenix, AZ	April 30-May 1	Carl Roberge	Kristi Overton	Bruce Neville	n/a
1994	Camden, SC	May 14–15	Andy Mapple	Kristi Overton	Sammy Duvall	n/a
1994	Chicago, IL	June 11–12	Andy Mapple	Toni Neville	Scot Ellis	n/a
1994	Indianapolis, IN	June 25–26	Wade Cox	Helena Kjellander	Sammy Duvall	n/a
1994	Hartford, CT	July 9–10	Andy Mapple	Kristi Overton	Bruce Neville	n/a
1994	Shreveport, LA	July 15–17	Andy Mapple	Kristi Overton	Bruce Neville	n/a
1994	St. Louis, MO	July 30–31	Wade Cox	Kristi Overton	Sammy Duvall	n/a
1994	St. Paul, MN	August 6–7	Jeff Rodgers	Kristi Overton	Sammy Duvall	n/a
1994	Portland, OR	August 20–21	Andy Mapple	Kristi Overton	Sammy Duvall	n/a
1995	Orlando, FL	April 29–30	Andy Mapple	Susi Graham	Carl Roberge	n/a
1995	High Point, NC	May 13–14	Carl Roberge	Kristi Overton	Sammy Duvall	n/a
1995	Shreveport, LA	June 10–11	Wade Cox	Kristi Overton	Freddy Krueger	n/a
1995	Philadelphia, PA	June 17–18	Wade Cox	Kristi Overton	Carl Roberge	n/a
1995	Hartford, CT	July 8–9	Wade Cox	Helena Kjellander	Jaret Llewellyn	n/a
1995	Detroit, MI	July 15–16	Wade Cox	Kristi Overton	Carl Roberge	n/a
1995	Indianapolis, IN	July 29–30	Andy Mapple	Kristi Overton	Bruce Neville	n/a
1995	St. Paul, MN	August 5–6	Wade Cox	Kristi Overton	Carl Roberge	n/a
1995	Portland, OR	August 19–20	Wade Cox	Kristi Overton	Freddy Krueger	n/a
1995	Seattle, WA	August 26–27	Carl Roberge	Jennifer Leachman	John Swanson	n/a
1996	Orlando, FL	April 13–14	Wade Cox	n/a	Carl Roberge	n/a
1996	High Point, NC	May 18–19	Patrice Martin	n/a	Carl Roberge	n/a
1996	Shreveport, LA	June 8–9	Wade Cox	n/a	Carl Roberge	n/a
1996	Hartford, CT	July 6–7	Cancelled	n/a	Carl Roberge	n/a
1996	Indianapolis, IN	July 13–14	Wade Cox	n/a	Carl Roberge	n/a
1996	Detroit, MI	July 27–28	Wade Cox	n/a	Carl Roberge	n/a
1996	Omaha, NE	August 3–4	Wade Cox	n/a	Carl Roberge	n/a
1996	Portland, OR	August 17–18	Andy Mapple	n/a	Carl Roberge	n/a
1997	Orlando, FL	April 12–13	Andy Mapple	n/a	Bruce Neville	n/a
1997	Charleston, SC	May 3–4	Andy Mapple	n/a	John Levingston	n/a
1997	Austin, TX	June 7–8	Wade Cox	n/a	Carl Roberge	n/a
1997	Shreveport, LA	June 14–15	Andy Mapple	n/a	Bruce Neville	n/a
1997	Hartford, CT	July 12–13	Andy Mapple	n/a	Bruce Neville	n/a
1997	Indianapolis, IN	July 12–20	Wade Cox	n/a	Bruce Neville	n/a
1997	Sacramento, CA	August 2–3	Wade Cox	n/a	Curtis Sheers	n/a
1997	Portland, OR	August 9–10	Carl Roberge	n/a	Jaret Llewellyn	n/a
1998	Fort Lauderdale, FL	April 4–5	Wade Cox	n/a	Freddy Krueger	n/a
1998	Charleston, SC	May 2–3	Andy Mapple	n/a	Freddy Krueger	n/a
1998	Shreveport, LA	June 13–14	Andy Mapple	n/a	Scot Ellis	n/a
1998	Hartford, CT	July 11–12	Andy Mapple	n/a	Bruce Neville	n/a
1998	Vancouver, BC	July 25–26	Andy Mapple	n/a	Jaret Llewellyn	n/a
1998	Portland, OR	August 1–2	Wade Cox	n/a	Jaret Llewellyn	n/a
1998	Sacramento, CA	August 8–9	Andy Mapple	n/a	Jaret Llewellyn	n/a
1999	Orlando, FL	April 17–18	Andy Mapple	n/a	Jaret Llewellyn	n/a
1999	Fort Lauderdale, FL	May 1–2	Andy Mapple	n/a	Bruce Neville	n/a
1999	Shreveport, LA	June 5–6	Andy Mapple	n/a	Scot Ellis/ Jaret Llewellyn	n/a
1999	Sacramento, CA	June 26–27	Andy Mapple/ Wade Cox	n/a	Scot Ellis	n/a
1999	Portland, OR	July 17–18	Jeff Rodgers	n/a	Jaret Llewellyn	n/a
1999	Vancouver, BC	July 14–25	Andy Mapple	n/a	Bruce Neville	n/a
1999	Detroit, MI	August 21–22	Andy Mapple	n/a	Freddy Krueger	n/a
2000	Fort Lauderdale, FL	April 1–2	Andy Mapple	Kristi Overton	Freddy Krueger	n/a
2000	Orlando, FL	April 13–16	Wade Cox	Toni Neville	Jaret Llewellyn	Emma Sheers
2000	Greenville, NC	May 20–21	Ben Favret	Toni Neville	Jaret Llewellyn	Britta Llewellyn
2000	Oklahoma City, OK	June 3–4	Carl Roberge	n/a	Jimmy Siemers	n/a
2000	Hartford, CT	June 10–11	Andy Mapple	Kristi Overton	Ryan Fitts	Emma Sheers
2000	Detroit, MI	June 17–18	Andy Mapple	Kristi Overton	Scot Ellis	n/a
2000	Portland, OR	July 15–16	Andy Mapple	n/a	Jaret Llewellyn	n/a
2000	Vancouver, BC	July 22–23	Andy Mapple	Toni Neville	Curtis Sheers	Toni Neville
2001	Orlando, FL	March 31-April 1	Andy Mapple	Emma Sheers	Jaret Llewellyn	n/a
2001	Fort Lauderdale, FL	April 7–8	Andy Mapple	Emma Sheers	Jaret Llewellyn	Emma Sheers
2001	Detroit, MI	June 16–17	Andy Mapple	Kristi Overton	Freddy Krueger	n/a
2001	Indianapolis, IN	June 23–24	Jaime Beauchesne	Kristi Overton	Slalom only	
2001	High Point, NC	June 30-July 1	Wakeboard only			
2001	Portland, OR	July 21–22	Cancelled due to poor weather conditions			
2001	Vancouver, BC	July 27–29	Chris Parrish	Kristi Overton	Freddy Krueger	n/a
