= List of U.S. Open of Water Skiing champions =

U.S. Open Water Ski Champions

The U.S. Open is a professional water ski tournament that ran regularly from 1987 to 2007. Since then it has experienced brief comebacks running for three years from 2014 to 2016, and most recently in 2021.

U.S. Open of Water Skiing Champions
Year	Location	Slalom	Trick	Jump	Overall
1987	West Palm Beach, FL	Andy Mapple	Cory Pickos	Mike Hazelwood	Carl Roberge
1987	West Palm Beach, FL	Jennifer Leachman	Britt Larsen	Deena Brush	Deena Brush
1988	West Palm Beach, FL	Andy Mapple	Kreg Llewellyn	Sammy Duvall	Carl Roberge
1988	West Palm Beach, FL	Deena Brush Mapple	Tawn Larsen	Deena Brush Mapple	Deena Brush Mapple
1989	Zachary, LA	Andy Mapple	Kreg Llewellyn	Mike Kjellander	Kreg Llewellyn
1989	Zachary, LA	Deena Brush Mapple	Tawn Larsen	Deena Brush Mapple	Deena Brush Mapple
1990	Sacramento, CA	Carl Roberge	Mick Neville	Carl Roberge	Carl Roberge
1990	Sacramento, CA	Susi Graham	Britt Larsen	Deena Brush Mapple	Deena Brush Mapple
1991	Sacramento, CA	Andy Mapple	Patrice Martin	Sammy Duvall	Sammy Duvall
1991	Sacramento, CA	Tie: Helena Kjellander/Jennifer Leachman	Tawn Larsen	Sherri Slone	Karen Neville
1992	Destin, FL	Carl Roberge	Cory Pickos	Carl Roberge	Patrice Martin
1992	Destin, FL	Susi Graham	Tawn Larsen	Deena Brush Mapple	Julie Petrus
1993	Destin, FL	Andy Mapple	Patrice Martin	Sammy Duvall	Patrice Martin
1993	Destin, FL	Susi Graham	Tawn Larsen	Camille Duvall	Kim DeMacedo
1994	West Palm Beach, FL	Andy Mapple	Cory Pickos	Scot Ellis	Patrice Martin
1994	West Palm Beach, FL	Susi Graham	Britt Larsen	Sherri Slone	Julie Petrus-Shull
1995	Chicago, IL	Carl Roberge	Patrice Martin	Jaret Llewellyn	Patrice Martin
1995	Chicago, IL	Kristi Overton	Rhoni Barton	Sherri Slone	Rhoni Barton
1996	Greenville, NC	Wade Cox	Russell Gay	Carl Roberge	Patrice Martin
1996	Greenville, NC	Kristi Overton Johnson	Brandi Hunt	Emma Sheers	Brandi Hunt
1997	Greenville, NC	Andy Mapple	Kyle Peterson	Steffen Wild	Patrice Martin
1997	Greenville, NC	Susi Graham	Britt Larsen	Emma Sheers	Rhoni Barton
1998	Pensacola, FL	Jamie Beauchesne	[?]	Andrea Alessi	[?]
1998	Pensacola, FL	Emma Sheers	[?]	Emma Sheers	Karen Truelove
1999	Austin, TX	Andy Mapple	Cory Pickos	Freddy Krueger	Patrice Martin
1999	Austin, TX	Kristi Overton Johnson	Tawn Larsen-Hahn	Emma Sheers	Rhoni Barton
2000	Sacramento, CA	Jamie Beauchesne	Cory Pickos	Freddy Krueger	Jaret Llewellyn
2000	Sacramento, CA	Kristi Overton Johnson	Tawn Larsen-Hahn	Toni Neville	Brandi Hunt
2001	Shreveport, LA	Andy Mapple	Cory Pickos	Freddy Krueger	Patrice Martin
2001	Shreveport, LA	Emma Sheers	Regina Jaquess	Toni Neville	Regina Jaquess
2002	Houston, TX	Andy Mapple	Cory Pickos	Jimmy Siemers	Jimmy Siemers
2002	Houston, TX	Karen Truelove	Regina Jaquess	Emma Sheers	Regina Jaquess
2003	Houston, TX	Andy Mapple	Nicolas LeForestier	Jaret Llewellyn	Jaret Llewellyn
2003	Houston, TX	Karen Truelove	Mandy Nightingale	Emma Sheers	Rhoni Barton
2005	Orlando, FL	Chris Parrish	Aliaksei Zharnasek	Freddy Krueger	n/a
2005	Orlando, FL	Regina Jaquess	Mandy Nightingale	June Fladborg	n/a
2006	Orlando, FL	Chris Parrish	Jaret Llewellyn	Freddy Krueger	n/a
2006	Orlando, FL	Regina Jaquess	Mandy Nightingale	Regina Jaquess	n/a
2007	Orlando, FL	Marcus Brown	Aliaksei Zharnasek	Jaret Llewellyn	n/a
2007	Orlando, FL	Karen Truelove	Mandy Nightingale	Angeliki Andriopoulou	n/a
2014	Orlando, FL	Nate Smith	Aliaksei Zharnasek	Zack Worden	n/a
2014	Orlando, FL	Regina Jaquess	Erika Lang	Natalia Berdnikava	n/a
2015	Groveland, FL	Nate Smith	Aliaksei Zharnasek	Freddy Krueger	n/a
2015	Groveland, FL	Regina Jaquess	Anna Gay	Jacinta Carroll	n/a
2016	West Palm Beach, FL	Adam Sedlmajer	Aliaksei Zharnasek	Ryan Dodd	n/a
2016	West Palm Beach, FL	Whitney McClintock	Anna Gay	Jacinta Carroll	n/a
2021	Wilmington, IL	Nate Smith	Patricio Font	Freddy Krueger	Martin Kolman
2021	Wilmington, IL	Whitney McClintock Rini	Giannina Bonnemann	Hanna Straltsova	Giannina Bonnemann
