= Mapple =

Mapple may refer to:

- Andy Mapple (1962–2015), British-born, United States-based water skier
- Deena Brush Mapple (born 1960), American water skier
- Father Mapple, fictional preacher in Herman Melville's novel Moby-Dick
- Mapple, parody technology company in The Simpsons, first appearing in "MyPods and Boomsticks" The reference continued for multiple episodes.
- Mapple, the guidebook published by Shobunsha
