= Water skiing at the 1981 World Games =

The waterskiing events of World Games I were held on July 25–26, 1981, at Berkeley Aquatic Park in Berkeley, California. These were the first World Games, an international quadrennial multi-sport event, and were hosted by the city of Santa Clara, California, in the United States. A world record in tricks highlighted the first day of competition. Ana Maria Carrasco of Venezuela broke her own world record with a score of 6970.

== Medalists ==
Event	Gold	Silver	Bronze
Men
Slalom	Bob LaPoint (USA)	Andy Mapple (GBR)	Mike Neville (AUS)
Tricks	Patrice Martin (FRA)	Carl Roberge (USA)	Sammy Duvall (USA)
Jumping	Sammy Duvall (USA)	Mike Hazelwood (GBR)	Glen Thurlow (AUS)
Overall	Sammy Duvall (USA)	Carl Roberge (USA)	Mike Neville (AUS)
Women
Slalom	Cyndi Benzel (USA)	Sue Fieldhouse (AUS)	Cindy Todd (USA)
Tricks	Ana María Carrasco (VEN)	Karin Roberge (USA)	Anita Carlman (SWE)
Jumping	Marion van Dijk (NED)	Sue Lipplegoes (AUS)	Cindy Todd (USA)
Overall	Ana María Carrasco (VEN)	Anita Carlman (SWE)	Karin Roberge (USA)

== Details ==
=== Men ===
==== Slalom ====
Qualifying (top 8 to quarterfinals)

1. Bob LaPoint, USA, 33 2. John McElyea, USA, 32 3. Lucky Lowe, USA, 31 4. (tie) Sammy Duvall, USA; Andy Mapple, Britain; Mike Neville, Australia, 26 7. Rick McCormick, USA, 25 ½ 8. Eddy de Telder, Belgium, 25 9. Andres Granato, Italy, 23 ½ 10. Glen Thurlow, Australia, 22 11. Geoff Carrington, Australia, 21 ½ 12. John West, Britain, 21 ¼ 13. Moshe Ganzi, Israel, 21 14. Mike Hazelwood, Britain, 20 ½ 15. Peter Bryant, Britain, 20 16. Marco Mario, Italy, 19 ½ 17. Varl Roberge, USA, 19 18. Juan Alvarez, Colombia, 17 19. Pedro Tuhsch, Spain 4 ½ 20. Grant Covie, New Zealand, 3 ½

Quarterfinals

Bob LaPoint, USA, d. Eddy de Telder, Belgium, 21-20 ½; Mike Neville, Australia, d. Sammy Duvall, USA, 27 ½ - 25 ½; John McElyea, USA, d. Rick McCormick, USA, 27-26 ¼; Andy Mapple, Britain, d. Lucky Lowe, USA, 31-27 ¼ .

Semifinals

Mapple d. McElyea, 21 ½ -20 ½; LaPoint d. Neville, 32-24 ½ .

Final

LaPoint d. Mapple, 21-12 ½ .

Standings – 1. LaPoint. 2. Mapple. 3. Neville. 4. McElyea. 5. Lowe. 6. McCormick. 7. Duvall. 8. de Telder.

==== Tricks ====
Qualifying (top 8 to semifinals)

1. Patrice Martin, France, 8090 2. Sammy Duvall, USA, 7190 3. Mike Neville, Australia, 7120 4. Eddy de Telder, Belgium, 6900 5. Carl Roberge, USA, 6660 6. Moshe Ganzi, Israel 6120 7. Lucky Lowe, USA, 6110 8. John West, Britain 5980 9. Mike Hazelwood, Britain, 5860 10. Guillermo Bertolo, Argentina 4680 11. Grant Covie, New Zealand 4570 12. Rick McCormick, USA 4340 13. Juan Alvarez, Colombia, 4240 14. Glen Thurlow, Australia, 4010 15. Jack Ellison, USA, 3820 16. Andy Mapple, Britain, 3600 17. Peter Bryant, Britain, 3460 18. Pedro Tuhsch, Spain, 2910 19. Geoff Carrington, Australia, 2510

Semifinals (top 4 to final)

1. Patrice Martin, France, 8040. 2. Mike Neville, Australia, 7270. 3. Sammy Duvall, USA, 7190. 4. Carl Roberge, USA, 6920. 5. Eddy de Telder, Belgium, 6270. 6. Lucky Lowe, USA, 5060. 7. John West, Britain, 4330. 8. Moshe Ganzi, Israel, 3580.

Final

1. Martin, 8420. 2. Roberge, 7660. 3. Duvall, 7370. 4. Neville, 7210.

==== Jumping ====
Qualifying (top 8 to quarterfinals)

1. Sammy Duvall, USA, 177 2. Mike Hazelwood, Britain, 176 3. Carl Roberge, USA, 172 4. Glen Thurlow, Australia, 169 5. Bob LaPoint, USA, 167 6. Moshe Ganzi, Israel, 166 7. Geoff Carrington, Australia, 163 8. Rick McCormick, 160 9. Lucky Lowe, USA, 160 10. Pedro Tuhsch, Spain, 159 11. Andres Granato, Italy, 159 12. Eddy de Telder, Belgium, 159 13. Mike Neville, Australia, 157 14. Peter Bryant, Britain, 156 15. Juan Alvarez, Colombia, 149 16. Guillermo Bertolo, Argentina, 143 17. Andy Mapple, Britain, 137

Quarterfinals

Carl Roberge, USA d. Moshe Ganzi, Israel, 171-158; Mike Hazlewood, Britain, d. Geoff Carrington, Australia, 176-156; Glen Thurlow, Australia, d. Bob LaPoint, USA, 169-164; Sammy Duvall, USA, d. Rick McCormick, USA, 175-158.

Semifinals

Hazelwood d. Roberge, 175-167; Duvall d. Thurlow, 170-169.

Final

Duvall d. Hazelwood, 174-173. 3rd place, Thurlow.

==== Overall (3 events) ====
1. Duvall. 2. Roberge. 3. Neville. 4. Lowe.

=== Women ===
==== Slalom ====
Qualifying (top 4 to semifinals)

1. Cyndi Benzel, USA, 25 ½ 2. Cindy Todd, USA, 24 ½ 3. Sue Fieldhouse, Australia, 23 4. Karin Roberge, 22 5. (tie) Lisa Sokolowski, Canada; Karen Bowkell, Australia, 21 7. Anita Carlman, Sweden; Ana Maria Carrasco, Venezuela 20 ½ 9. Deena Brush, USA, 20 ¼ 10. Karen Morse, Britain, 20 11. Silvia Rebora, Italy, 19 12. Marion Van Dijk, Netherlands, 18 13. Judy McClintock, Canada, 12 ½ 14. Sue Lipplegoes, Australia, 6 ½

Semifinals

Cyndi Benzel, USA d. Karin Roberge, USA, 26-22; Sue Fieldhouse, Australia, d. Cindy Todd, USA, 28-24.

Final

Benzel d. Fieldhouse, 21-20 ½.

Standings – 1. Benzel. 2. Fieldhouse, Todd. 4. Roberge.

==== Tricks ====
Qualifying (top 4 to final)

1. Ana Maria Carrasco, Venezuela, 6970 (world record, previous record 6870, Carrasco, 1981) 2. Karin Roberge, USA, 5960 3. Anita Carlman, Sweden, 5820 4. Cyndi Benzel, USA, 4750 5. Cindy Todd, USA, 3950 6. Lisa Sokolowski, Canada, 3850 7. Sue Fieldhouse, Australia, 3380 8. Sue Lipplegoes, Australia, 3370 9. Deena Brush, USA, 3190 10. Karen Bowkell, Australia, 2950 11. Marion Van Dijk, Netherlands, 2930 12. Judy McClintock, Canada, 2700 13. Karin Morse, Britain, 2560

Final

1. Ana Maria Carrasco, Venezuela, 6710. 2. Karin Roberge, USA, 5620. 3. Anita Carlman, Sweden, 5450. 4. Cyndi Benzel, USA, 4630.

==== Jumping ====
Qualifying

not available

Semifinals

Sue Lipplegoes, Australia, d. July McClintock, Canada, 118-112; Marion Van Dijk, Netherlands, d. Cindy Todd, USA, 115-114.

Final

Van Dijk d. Lipplegoes, 120-119. 3rd place, Todd.

==== Overall (3 events) ====
1. Carrasco. 2. Carlman. 3. Roberge. 4. Benzel.
