= Lake Kristi =

Private water skiing-site located in Greenville, North Carolina

- Lake Kristi (North Carolina)

- Location within North Carolina
- Location: Greenville, North Carolina
- Coordinates: 35.5610°N 77.2390°W
- Type: Reservoir
- Etymology: Kristi Overton Johnson
- Catchment area: 289 sq mi (750 km^{2})
- Basin countries: United States
- Max. length: 1. 1,950 feet (590 m); 2. 1,850 feet (560 m)
- Max. width: 1. 210–300 feet (64–91 m); 2. 210 feet (64 m)

Lake Kristi is a private water skiing-site located in Greenville, North Carolina containing two artificial lakes. The lake is named after former water skiing champion Kristi Overton Johnson. Although specifically designed for water skiing, Lake Kristi is also used as a cross country course.

== Description ==
The original Lake Kristi was finished in 1981 at a length of 1,950 feet (590 m) and width of 210–300 feet (64–91 m). The second lake, nearby, was finished in 2000 at a length of 1,850 feet (560 m) and width of 210 feet (64 m). The lakes are described as championship calibre.

== Location ==
Lake Kristi, located eight miles from Greenville, is built in Parker Overton's backyard, originally built for his daughter, Kristi Overton Johnson at the age of 12. The lake was built as the nearest location for water skiing at the time was a river over 1 hour away.

== Usage ==
The lake's surrounding area, approximately 300 acres (120 ha), is predominantly used for cross country running meetings, including National Collegiate Athletic Association Regional Championships (2003 & 2005) and Conference USA Championship (2001 & 2006) meets.

The lake previously hosted the 1996 and 1997 U.S. Open Water Ski Championships. Lake Kristi hosted Greenville's first Pro Tour event as part of the U.S. Open. In 1989, Lake Kristi was listed as one of over 150 supersites in the United States, with only three of these sites being in North Carolina.

Aside from being used as a tournament site, Kristi was also used as test site for Overton's marine business.
