= Sherri Slone =

American Water Skier

Personal information
- Born: May 6, 1966 (age 59); Hays, Kansas
- Height: 5 ft 4 in (163 cm)

Sport
- Country: USA
- Sport: Waterskiing
- Coached by: Jay Bennett

Sherri Slone is a former professional water skier and former World Record holder. She is the only skier to win two professional titles in the same day, winning the 1990 Michelob Dry Water Ski Tour stop in Ft. Worth, Texas and the 1990 Budget Rent a Car (PAWS) Tour stop in Dallas, Texas in June 1990. Sherri Slone also won a gold medal in women's water skiing at the 1995 Pan American Games in Argentina.

Slone retired from water skiing in 2000 and was inducted into the Water Ski Hall of Fame in 2012.

== Notable accomplishments ==
=== 1990 season ===
Slone dominated the Michelob Dry Waterski Tour in 1990 after ending Deena Mapple's 38-win streak at the Budget Rent a Car Tour stop at Bachman Lake in Dallas, Texas. Slone had taken the Women's Jump Title at the Ft. Worth stop of the Michelob Dry Waterski Tour earlier that day making her the only skier to win two professional titles in the same day.

=== World record ===
Slone co-held the Women's Jump World Record - jumping 156 feet at the 1995 U.S. Team Trials held at Lake David in Groveland, FL. This jump tied Deena Brush's record which had stood for seven years.

=== WOW Tour ===
Slone was a long time advocate of women in sport and when women's events were dropped from the U.S. Professional Water Ski Tour, she and Jennifer Leachman founded the WOW (Women of Watersports) Tour for the 1997 season which consisted of professional events featuring female skiing exclusively. Events from the WOW Tour would be broadcast on Fox Sports as Curves - featuring highlights from the stops as well as behind the scenes content. In addition to hosting professional events, the WOW organization hosted learn to ski/wakeboard clinics in an effort to get more women involved in watersports.

=== Major titles ===
Major Titles
World Championship Titles	1991
Pro Tour Titles	1990, 1991
Masters Titles	1995
Pan American Games	1995
U.S. National Championships	1991
