= Michael Kjellander =

Personal information
- National team: Sweden
- Born: March 14, 1964 (age 61) Ödeshög, Sweden
- Height: 6 ft 4 in (193 cm)

Sport
- Sport: Waterskiing
- Event(s): Slalom, Jump, Overall

Michael "Mike" Kjellander (born 14 March 1964) is a Swedish former professional water skier. He won the US Pro Tour 21 times (four times total winner), two times Masters champion, one-time US Open champion, 15 times European champion, 32 times national champion, two silver and one bronze from World Championship, and one-time world record holder. He specialized in slalom and jump but was initially also successful as an overall skier. He is still the national current record holder in tricks with a score of 7,760 points (set in 1984).

== Biography ==
He grew up in Ödeshög Sweden together with his sister Helena and brother Richard, who were also successful water skiers. He started to water ski at the age of six at Motala Water Ski Club. At an early age, he was also a competitive downhill skier and combined it successfully by living in Northern Sweden for part of the year. At the age of 16, he gave up snow skiing and went to live in Florida and water ski professionally. At the age of 17, he won his first open European Championships title in slalom. In 1988, broke the world slalom record in West Palm Beach, Florida with a score of one buoy on 10.25 meters (41 feet off). He was the first person in the world to successfully run through 10.75 meters (39.5 feet off). Kjellander was known for his aggressive style when skiing and came to be known as "Slam Dunk Mike". As a testimony to his successful career and contribution to the sport, he was inducted into the Water Ski Hall of Fame in 2015.

== Achievements ==
Major Championships
Masters	1989, 1993
U.S. National Championships	1989
World Championships	N/a
European Championships	1981, 1983, & 1984

World Records
29 Oct 1988	1.0 @ 10.25 m	tied by Andy Mapple 30 Oct 1988 and beaten by Andy Mapple 11 Dec 1988 2.0 @ 10.25 m
