= Camille Duvall =

American water skier and sports commentator

Personal information
- Nickname: The Golden Goddess
- Born: July 11, 1960 (age 65) Greenville, South Carolina
- Education: New York University
- Height: 5 ft 11 in (180 cm)

Sport
- Country: United States
- Sport: Professional Water Skiing

Camille Duvall, also known as "The Golden Goddess", is a retired American female professional water skier. She is a five-time World Champion and Hall of Fame water skier. After her water skiing career, Camille worked for ESPN and Fox Sports as a broadcast journalist. Now she is a licensed real estate broker in New York, New York for Warburg Realty. She received a certificate in Broadcasting from New York University.

== Career ==
Duvall began water-skiing at the age of 4, and won her first tournament at the age of 6. She won a junior national competition at 12. In 1985, she held the waterskiing's triple crown, being the U.S. National Champion, World Slalom Champion, and Masters Champion. She won 14 national titles in the course of her career.

In 1987, she became the first woman water skier to earn more than $100,000 in prizes and endorsements.

== Notable accomplishments ==
=== Major titles ===
Major slalom titles
World Championship Titles	1985
Pro Tour Titles	1984, 1985, 1986, 1987, 1988
Masters Titles	1984, 1986, 1987

Major Trick Titles
Masters Titles	1976

Major jump titles
Masters Titles	1983
