= Jacinta Carroll =

American water skier (born 1992)

Personal information
- Nickname: Rabbit
- National team: Australia
- Born: September 12, 1992 (age 33); Geelong, Victoria
- Height: 153 cm (5 ft 0 in)

Sport
- Country: Australia
- Sport: Waterskiing
- Event: Jump
- Coached by: Ray Stokes
- Retired: March 11, 2024

Jacinta Carroll is a former professional water skier, five-time World Record holder, and five-time World Champion. Carroll was the first woman to jump 200 feet, with a 201 foot jump (61.3 m) at the 2021 MasterCraft Pro in Polk City, Florida.

In addition to being the first woman to clear the 200' barrier, Carroll became the first woman to jump over 60 meters with a 60.3 meter jump at the Ski Fluid Invitational on September 26, 2016. Carroll did not lose a professional event in which she has competed since coming second at the 2013 Moomba Masters.

== Athletic career ==
The International Waterski and Wakeboard Federation named Carroll the Female Waterskier of the Decade (2010-2019).

== Notable accomplishments ==
=== World records ===
	World Records			
193'	58.8 m	May 17, 2015	Sunset Lakes	Groveland, FL
194'	59.1 m	May 17, 2015	Sunset Lakes	Groveland, FL
194'	59.2 m	September 26, 2016	Lake Grew	Polk City, FL
198'	60.3 m	September 26, 2016	Lake Grew	Polk City, FL
201'	61.3 m	October 31, 2021	McCormick's	Polk City, FL

=== Major titles ===
Major Titles
World Championship Titles	2013, 2015, 2017, 2019, 2021
Masters Titles	2013, 2014, 2015, 2016, 2017, 2018, 2019
Moomba Masters Titles	2011, 2014, 2015, 2016, 2017, 2018, 2019, 2020, 2022, 2023, 2024
