= Chris Parrish =

American water skier (born 1979)

Personal information
- Nickname: The Tower
- Born: January 19, 1979 (age 47)

Sport
- Country: United States
- Sport: Waterskiing
- Event: Slalom

Chris Parrish (born 19 January 1979) is an American professional water skier. From 15 May 2005 to 2 June 2013 Parrish held the world record for Slalom skiing. During that time he tied his record once and beat it twice. In addition to his world records, he has won nine major championships, and is regarded as one of the most dominant athletes in water skiing .

== Biography ==
Chris Parrish was born in Destin, Florida on 19 January 1979. He began water skiing at the age of 2. Nicknames: The Tower and The Pickleman

== Achievements ==
World Records
1.25@43 off	May 15, 2005	Isle of Lake Hancock	Winter Garden, FL
1.5@43 off	August 28, 2005	Trophy Lakes	Charleston, SC
2@43 off	June 13, 2010	Covington Ski Ranch	Covington, LA

Major Titles
Masters Titles	2002, 2005
Moomba Masters Titles	2000, 2008, 2009, 2013
