= Ricky McCormick =

American water skier (born 1952)

Ricky McCormick (born March 14, 1952) is an American water skier. He won 11 world titles, 37 national championships. He was awarded two gold medals for Water skiing at the 1972 Summer Olympics, though as it was a demonstration sport that year they are not included in the medal table. He came from a family of water skiers so started at age five. In 1982 he retired and in 1988 he was inducted into the Water Skiing Hall of Fame.

McCormick was featured on the Ed Sullivan program on January 15, 1967 with film of a 540 degree spin.

Ricky McCormick was the stunt double for Henry Winkler when the Fonz jumped the shark. Henry skied in the episode but it was Ricky that did the jump.
