= Kristi Overton Johnson =

American former water skiing champion, author, and missionary

Personal information
- Born: Kristi Overton; February 16, 1970 (age 56) Greenville, North Carolina, US
- Education: University of Central Florida, Bachelor of Arts; University of Florida College of Law, Juris Doctor
- Occupation(s): Former water skiing champion, author, and missionary
- Years active: 1983–2005
- Height: 5 ft 7.5 in (171 cm)
- Spouse: Tim Johnson (m. 1994)

Sport
- Sport: Water skiing
Medal record
Women's water skiing
Representing United States
World Championships
Gold medal – first place	1999 Milan	Slalom
Pan American Games
Gold medal – first place	1999 Manitoba	Slalom

Kristi Overton Johnson (born February 16, 1970) is an American former water skiing champion, author, and missionary. Competing professionally between 1983 and 2005, Overton Johnson accumulated 80 pro victories.

== Athletic career ==
Overton Johnson was born in Greenville, North Carolina and started water skiing competitively at the age of five. She became professional at the age of 13. During her athletic career, Overton Johnson competed in the slalom, accumulating 80 pro-victories and more number 1 world rankings than any other female water skier. She was the holder of the women's world slalom record from 1992-2010. She is an eight-time U.S. Masters Champion, four-time U.S. Open Champion, and 1999 World Champion.

She was inducted into the North Carolina Sports Hall of Fame in 2012. She is one of five women featured in the North Carolina Women in Sports Display at the NC Sports Hall of Fame at the N.C. Museum of History in Raleigh. In 2013, she was inducted into the USA Water Ski Hall of Fame. In 2017, she was inducted into the International Water Ski & Wakeboard Federation Hall of Fame.

== Education ==
Overton Johnson attended the University of Central Florida completing a Bachelor of Arts. She went on to attend the University of Florida College of Law where she earned a Juris Doctor.

== Ministries and works ==
In 2003, Overton Johnson founded In His Wakes, which is a Christian-based water sports ministry. She later founded Kristi Overton Johnson Ministries and Victorious Living Magazine, a publication of KOJM. Victorious Living Magazine is a quarterly publication that is distributed within the US prison system.

Overton Johnson published her first book in 2004, titled Running the Course: Becoming a Champion in God's Eyes. She published her second book, Hit it!: Your Victory May Just be One "Hit it" Away!, in 2015. Victorious Living Magazine is published quarterly.

== Personal life ==
She lives in Keystone Heights, Florida with her husband, Tim, and three children.

Her father, V. Parker Overton, founded Overton's Inc. in Greenville in 1975 and became known as the world's largest water sports dealer. The company was eventually acquired by Camping World Holdings.

Lake Kristi, a man-made lake located in Grimesland, North Carolina, is named after her and was specifically designed for water skiing. It is privately owned by her father but it serves as the home course for East Carolina University's men's and women's cross country teams.

== Achievements ==
Major Championships
Masters	1985, 1986, 1992, 1994, 1995, 1996, 2000, 2002
U.S. Open	1995, 1996, 1999, 2000
U.S. Nationals	1996
World Championships	1999
Pan American Games	1999
