= Bob LaPoint =

American water skier

Sport
- Country: United States
- Sport: Watersking
- Event: Slalom

Bob LaPoint
Medal record

Men's waterskiing

Representing the United States

World Games
Gold medal – first place	1981 Santa Clara	Slalom

Bob LaPoint (born 25 May 1955) is an American former professional water skier. During his career he set the world record on five occasions and won 15 major championships. In 2006 he was inducted into the Water Ski Hall of Fame. He is the younger brother of water skier Kris LaPoint.

== Biography ==
Bob LaPoint was born in Castro Valley, California in 1955, two years after his brother Kris. He attended A.B. Morris Middle School and Castro Valley High School. Following his parents' divorce he moved to Novato, California where he graduated from San Marin High School.

In 1967, at the age of 12, he won the slalom and overall categories in the junior division at the U.S. National Water Ski Championships, beginning what would be highly successful career. He would later go on to win 15 major championships and set five world records.

LaPoint now works for HO Sports as a water ski designer, a job he has had since 2007. He lives in Truckee, California with his wife Erika, with whom he has had two children, Kristian and Simone. He has two other children, Kaci and Kara, from a previous marriage.

== Achievements ==
World Records
4@38' off	July 1976	Lake David	Groveland, FL
5@38' off	July 27, 1980		Berkeley, CA
2@39' off	August 15, 1980		Berkeley, CA
3@39' off	October 1980	McCormick's	Seffner, FL
5@39' off	September 1984	McCormick's	Seffner, FL

Major Titles
World Championship Titles	1977, 1979, 1983, 1985, 1987
Pro Tour Titles	1984, 1990
Masters	1975, 1976, 1980, 1982, 1983
U.S. National Championships	1976, 1978, 1979, 1984, 1988
