= Sammy Duvall =

American water skier

Personal information
- Born: Greenville, South Carolina, U.S.
- Height: 5 ft 8 in (173 cm)

Sport
- Country: USA
- Sport: Waterskiing

Sammy Duvall
Medal record

Men's waterskiing

Representing the United States

World Games
Gold medal – first place	1981 Santa Clara	Jumping
Gold medal – first place	1981 Santa Clara	Overall
Bronze medal – third place	1981 Santa Clara	Tricks

Pan American Games
Bronze medal – third place	1995 Mar del Plata	Jump

Sammy Duvall is a retired water-skier who had victories at the Masters Tournaments and the World water skiing champions. One of his more noted victories being a "came from behind" victory at the 1987 world championship. He officially retired in 1998 and in 2001 he was inducted into Water Skiing Hall of Fame. His older sister Camille also had success in the sport.

== Notable accomplishments ==
=== World records ===
Sammy broke

World records
62.4 m	July 29, 1988	Champion Lake	Shreveport, LA
62.9 m	April 12, 1992	Barnett Park	Orlando, FL
63.3 m	July 24, 1992	Champion Lake	Shreveport, LA
64.4 m	May 23, 1993	Sunset Lakes	Groveland, FL
64.9 m	October 9, 1993	Shortline Lakes	Santa Rosa Beach, FL
67.1 m	October 10, 1993	Shortline Lakes	Santa Rosa Beach, FL

=== Major titles ===
Major jump titles
World Championship Titles	1983, 1987
Pro Tour Titles	1985, 1988, 1989, 1991, 1992, 1994
Masters Titles	1979, 1980, 1982, 1988, 1989 1992
Pan American Games	
U.S. National Championships	

Major trick titles
Masters Titles	1982, 1984, 1985

Major overall titles
World Championship Titles	1981, 1983, 1985, 1987
Masters Titles	1982, 1984, 1985, 1988
