= Mike Hazelwood =

British water skier

Mike Hazelwood MBE
Personal information
- Born: 14 April 1958 (age 68)

Sport
- Sport: Waterskiing
- Retired: 1988
Medal record
Men's waterskiing
Representing Great Britain
World Games
Silver medal – second place	1981 Santa Clara	Jumping

Michael Hazelwood MBE (born 14 April 1958) is a retired British water skier and a was the world overall champion in 1977.

== Career ==
In July 1978, Hazelwood scored 3,038 points to win the men's overall title in the Masters waterskiing tournament at Callaway Gardens, Georgia. In 1980, Mike Hazelwood set his first World Record in the jump event with 59.4 metres. He went on to break the World record twice more. In 1981, Britain hosted the World Tournament Championships, with Hazelwood winning the gold medal in Jump. He competed as a member of the British team in eight consecutive World Championships, the longest competitive record at that level of anyone who has ever won a World Overall Championship. During that period, from 1973 to 1987, Hazelwood won three gold medals, including the one in 1977 for overall, five silver medals, and two bronze medals. As one of the most successful competitors of his long era, the British Crown honoured him with the title of MBE.

Jumping was always Hazelwood's strongest event, which he demonstrated by setting three world records between 1980 and 1986. Hazelwood was the dominant skier in Europe for over a decade, winning the European Overall Championship eight times between 1976 and 1986. In 1986, Hazelwood set a world record in distance jumping by soaring 203 feet at the Coors Light Water Ski Tour stop at the Iron Man Water Ski Classic in Birmingham, Alabama.

In 1994, Hazelwood appeared as a stunt double in the movie 'My Father, the Hero'. He also appeared on the cover of several waterski periodicals, including 'Waterski' Magazine.

In addition to water skiing, Hazelwood was an avid motocross competitor and cyclist, and won numerous motocross trophies during his competitive years.

== Notable accomplishments ==
=== World records ===
World Records
59.4 m	1980	Yarra River	Melbourne Australia
60.0 m	1981		
61.9	July 15, 1986		Birmingham, Alabama

=== Major titles ===
Major slalom titles
Masters Titles	1978, 1979

Major jump titles
World Championship Titles	1979, 1981
Pro Tour Titles	1984, 1986, 1987
Masters Titles	1977, 1981, 1984, 1985, 1986, 1987

Major Overall Titles
World Championship Titles	1977
Masters Titles	1978, 1979, 1980

== Retirement ==
Hazelwood retired in 1988 due to problems with a bad back. He was diagnosed with two stress fractures in his lower back by the time he was 16. From 1988, he ran a ski school in Lake Hamilton, Florida, until 1996, when he moved with his wife Renee, son Daniel and daughter Roxanne to Ocala. In March 1993, Hazelwood developed a new ski that he believed could bring him success at the Carlsberg Masters and attempted a comeback. Hazelwood later worked in a management position for Pilot Truckstops LLC near Ocala, Florida. He has since returned to live in Lincoln in the UK.
