= Andy Mapple =

British-American water skier (1962–2015)

Andy Mapple OBE
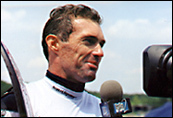
- Mapple in 1999

Personal information
- Full name: Andrew Henry Mapple OBE
- Born: 3 November 1962 Lytham St Annes, Lancashire, England
- Died: 22 August 2015 (aged 52) Florida, USA
- Height: 6 ft 2 in (188 cm)
- Spouse: Deena Brush Mapple

Sport
- Sport: Waterskiing
- Event: Slalom
- Retired: 2004
Medal record
Men's waterskiing
Representing Great Britain
World Games
Silver medal – second place	1981 Santa Clara	Slalom

Andrew Henry Mapple OBE (3 November 1962 – 22 August 2015) was a British-American professional water skier. Competing professionally between 1981 and 2004, Mapple is regarded as the greatest slalom skier of all time. During his career he won six World Championships, 168 professional events, and set or tied the world record on eleven occasions.

== Biography ==
Mapple was born in Lytham to Roy and Janet Mapple and grew up in Warton with both his sisters, Susan and Christine. At age 13 Mapple first learned to water ski at Windermere, being taught by his older sister Susan. Mapple attended Carr Hill High School in Kirkham, and during his time there was allowed to leave for extended periods to train at Princes Water Ski Club and Thorpe Waterski under the tutelage of his first coach Paul Seaton – European Champion 1972, 1974 and 1975. After winning his first World Slalom title in 1981 aged 18, Mapple spent winters in Florida and summers at Thorpe Waterski until moving to Florida permanently in the mid-1980s.

Mapple retired at the end of the 2004 season.

During his career Mapple founded his own company, Mapple Waterskis. The company was dissolved, but Andy's design carries on via Square One out of Washington. In 1987 he married Deena Brush, a professional water skier also. The couple lived on Lake Butler and had two children, Michael and Elyssa.

He was appointed Officer of the Order of the British Empire (OBE) in the 2002 Birthday Honours for services to water skiing.

Mapple died in Florida on 22 August 2015.

== Achievements ==
World Records
5@39' off	1 October 1985	Shortline Lake	Sacramento, CA
1@41' off	30 October 1988		Boynton Beach, FL
2@41' off	11 December 1988		
3@41' off	29 March 1989		
3.25@41' off	31 August 1991	Trophy Lakes	Charleston, SC
3.5@41' off	6 October 1991		Miami, FL
4@41' off	4 September 1994	Trophy Lakes	Charleston, SC
4.5@41' off	3 July 1996	McCormick's	Seffner, FL
1@43' off	4 October 1998		Miami, FL

Major slalom titles
World Championship Titles	1981, 1989, 1995, 1997, 1999, 2001
Pro Tour Titles	1987, 1989, 1991, 1992, 1993, 1994, 1997, 1998. 2000, 2001
Masters Titles	1984, 1985, 1986, 1987, 1988, 1990, 1992, 1994, 1997, 1998, 1999, 2000, 2001, 2003
U.S. Open Titles	1999
