= Deena Brush Mapple =

American water skier

Deena Brush-Mapple
Personal information
- Born: Deena Brush; March 2, 1960 (age 66) Sacramento, California, U.S.
- Height: 5 ft 6 in (168 cm)
- Spouse: Andy Mapple

Sport
- Country: United States
- Sport: Waterskiing
- Retired: 1995

Deena Mapple (born Deena Brush March 2, 1960) is a retired American competitive water skier. She is regarded to be one of the greatest female water skiers of her generation. Her Grand Slam Victory in 1987 - overall wins in the World Championships, U.S. Nationals, U.S. Masters and the Pro Tour - made her one of two athletes to ever accomplish the feat. She remains the only American to earn membership to the United States Waterskiing Team seven consecutive times.

== Marriage ==
In 1987, Brush married Andy Mapple, who would eventually be a six-time world water skiing champion, and a 14 time Masters Slalom Champion himself. After the marriage, she variously became referred to as Deena Brush Mapple, Deena Brush-Mapple and Deena Mapple.

== Notable accomplishments ==
=== World records ===
World records
46.1 m	May 30, 1987	Terra Mare	Houston, TX
46.6 m	May 31, 1987	Terra Mare	Houston, TX
46.9 m	July 25, 1987	Champion Lake	Shreveport, LA
47.5 m	July 9, 1988		Charlotte, MI

=== Major titles ===
Major jump titles
World Championship Titles	1981, 1985, 1987, 1989
Pro Tour Titles	1987, 1988, 1989
Masters Titles	1978, 1979, 1986, 1987, 1988, 1989, 1990, 1992, 1993
Pan American Games	

Major slalom titles
Masters Titles	1979, 1983, 1985
Pan American Games	1995

Major Overall Titles
World Championship Titles	1987, 1989
Masters Titles	1983, 1985, 1986, 1987, 1988, 1990, 1992, 1993

== See also ==
- Andy Mapple
- Waterskiing
- World water skiing champions
- Masters Waterski and Wakeboard Tournament
- List of Water Skiing Hall of Fame Inductees
- USA Water Ski
- United States Waterskiing Team
