= Water skiing =

Surface water sport

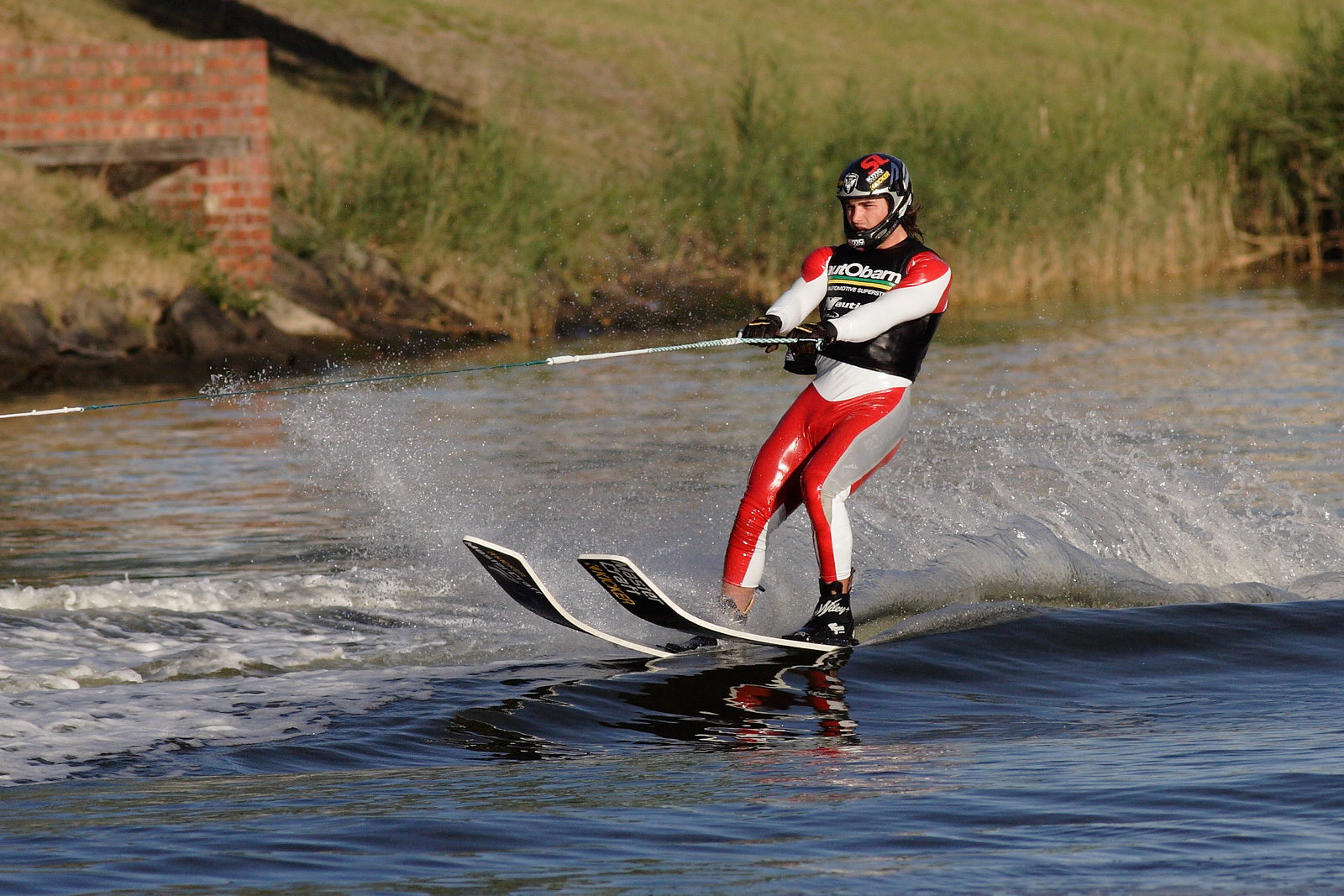
- Water skiing on the Yarra River in Melbourne
- Highest governing body: International Waterski & Wakeboard Federation
- First performed: 1922, United States

Characteristics
- Contact: No
- Mixed-sex: No
- Type: Aquatic
- Equipment: Water skis; motorboat; towline
- Venue: Body of water

Presence
- Olympic: Demonstration sport, 1972 Summer Olympics
- World Games: 1981–2022

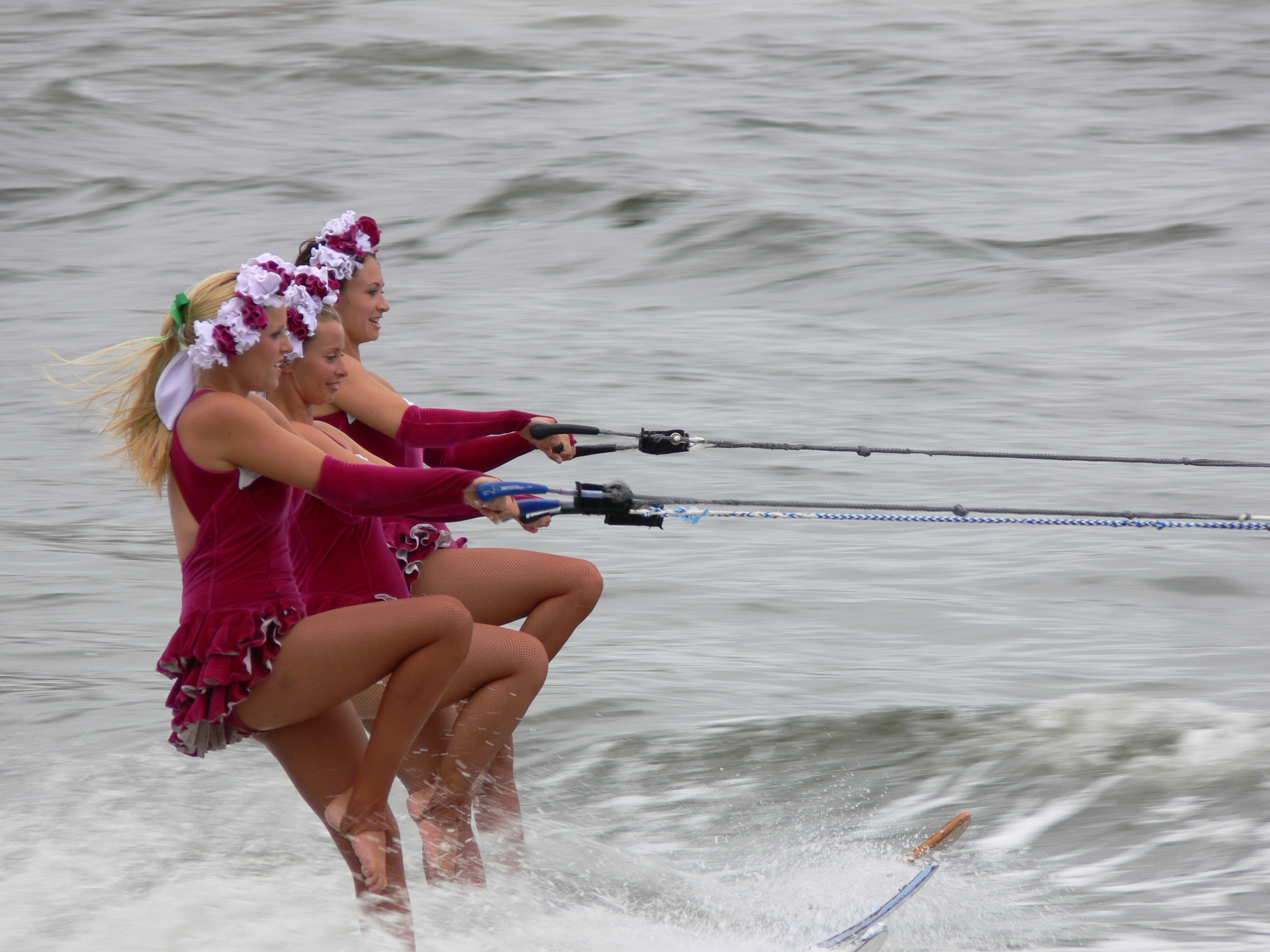
Water skiers performing at Sea World on the Gold Coast, Queensland, Australia

Water skiing (also waterskiing or water-skiing) is a surface water sport in which an individual is pulled behind a boat or a cable ski installation over a body of water, skimming the surface on one or two skis. The sport requires sufficient area on a stretch of water, one or two skis, a tow boat with tow rope, two or three people (depending on local boating laws), and a personal flotation device. In addition, the skier must have adequate upper and lower body strength, muscular endurance, and good balance.

There are water ski participants around the world, in Asia and Australia, Europe, Africa, and the Americas. In the United States alone, there are approximately 11 million water skiers and over 900 sanctioned water ski competitions every year. Australia boasts 1.3 million water skiers.

There are many options for recreational or competitive water skiers. These include speed skiing, trick skiing, show skiing, slaloming, jumping, barefoot skiing and wakeski. Similar, related sports are wakeboarding, kneeboarding, discing, tubing, and sit-down hydrofoil.

== Basic technique ==
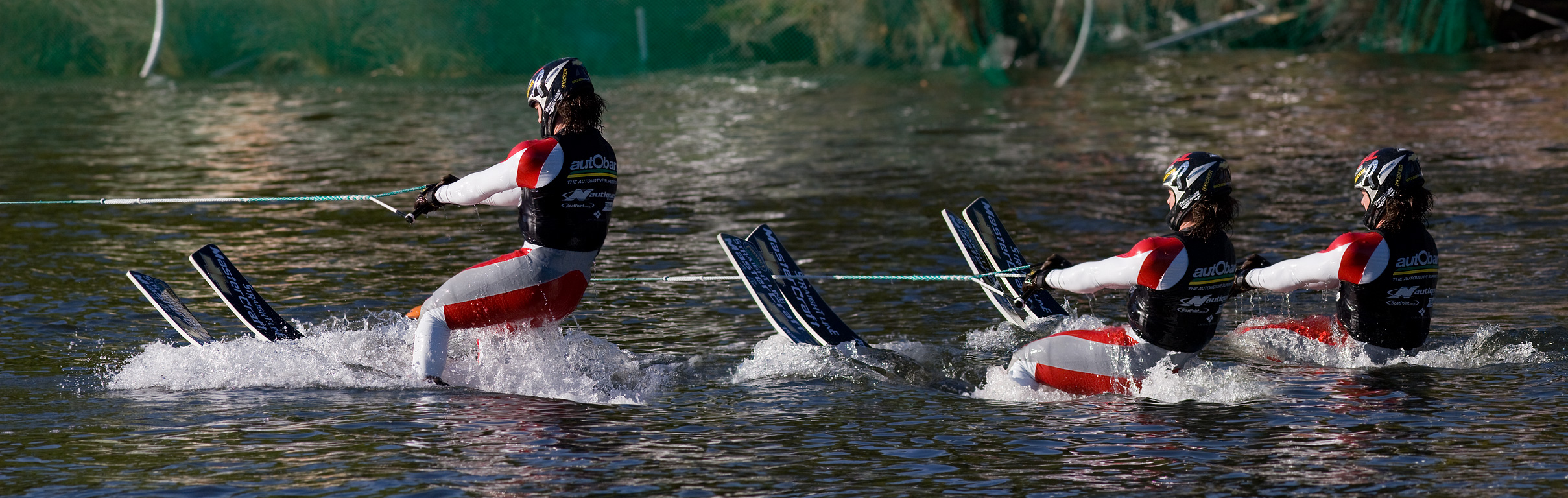
Water skiers rising out of the water in Melbourne

Water skiers can start their ski set in one of two ways: wet is the most common, but dry is possible. Water skiing typically begins with a deep-water start. The skier enters the water with their skis on or they jump in without the skis on their feet, having the skis floated to them, and put them on while in the water. Most times it can be easier to put the skis on when they are wet. Once the skier has their skis on they will be thrown a tow rope from the boat, which they position between their skis or, if on only one ski, to the left if right foot forward and to the right if left foot forward. In the deep-water start, the skier crouches down in the water while holding onto the ski rope; they are in a cannonball position with their legs tucked into their chest, with skis pointing towards the sky and approximately 30 cm (0.98 ft) of the ski out of the water. The skier can also perform a "dry start" by standing on the shore or a pier; however, this type of entry is recommended for professionals only. When the skier is ready (usually acknowledged by them yelling "in gear,": followed by "hit it"), the driver accelerates the boat. As the boat accelerates and takes up the slack on the rope, the skier allows the boat to pull them out of the water by applying some muscle strength to get into an upright body position.

By leaning back and keeping the legs slightly bent, the skis will eventually plane out and the skier will start to glide over the water. The skier turns by shifting weight left or right. The skier's body weight should be balanced between the balls of the feet and the heels. While being towed, the skier's arms should be relaxed but still fully extended so as to reduce stress on the arms. The handle can be held vertically or horizontally, depending on whichever position is more comfortable for the skier.

In addition to the driver and the skier, a third person known as the spotter or the observer should be present. The spotter's job is to watch the skier and inform the driver if the skier falls. The spotter usually sits in a chair on the boat facing backwards to see the skier. The skier and the boat's occupants communicate using hand signals (see the Safety section below).

== Equipment ==
=== Water ===
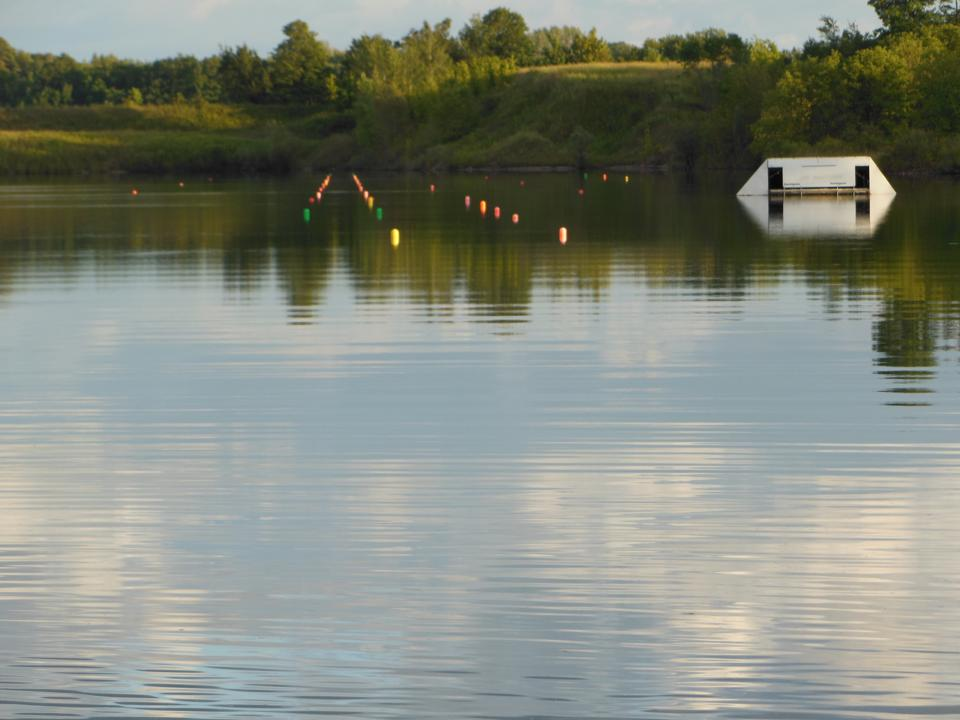
A privately owned, artificial water ski lake commonly referred to as Chantalyy Lakes By The Cliff Side, located near Orangeville, Ontario, seen with a slalom course and jump ramp

Water skiing can take place on any type of water – such as a river, lake, or ocean – but calmer waters are ideal for recreational skiing. There should be a 60-metre-wide (200 ft) skiing space and the water should be at least 1.5 to 1.8 metres (5 to 6 ft) deep. There must be enough space for the water skier to safely "get up", or successfully be in the upright skiing position. Skiers and their boat drivers must also have sufficient room to avoid hazards. Most competitive skiers ski on man-made ski lakes. The first was in Barstow, California, built by Jack Horton in 1969. The second, built by Herb O'Brien, was built in 1972 in Redmond Washington.

=== Skis ===
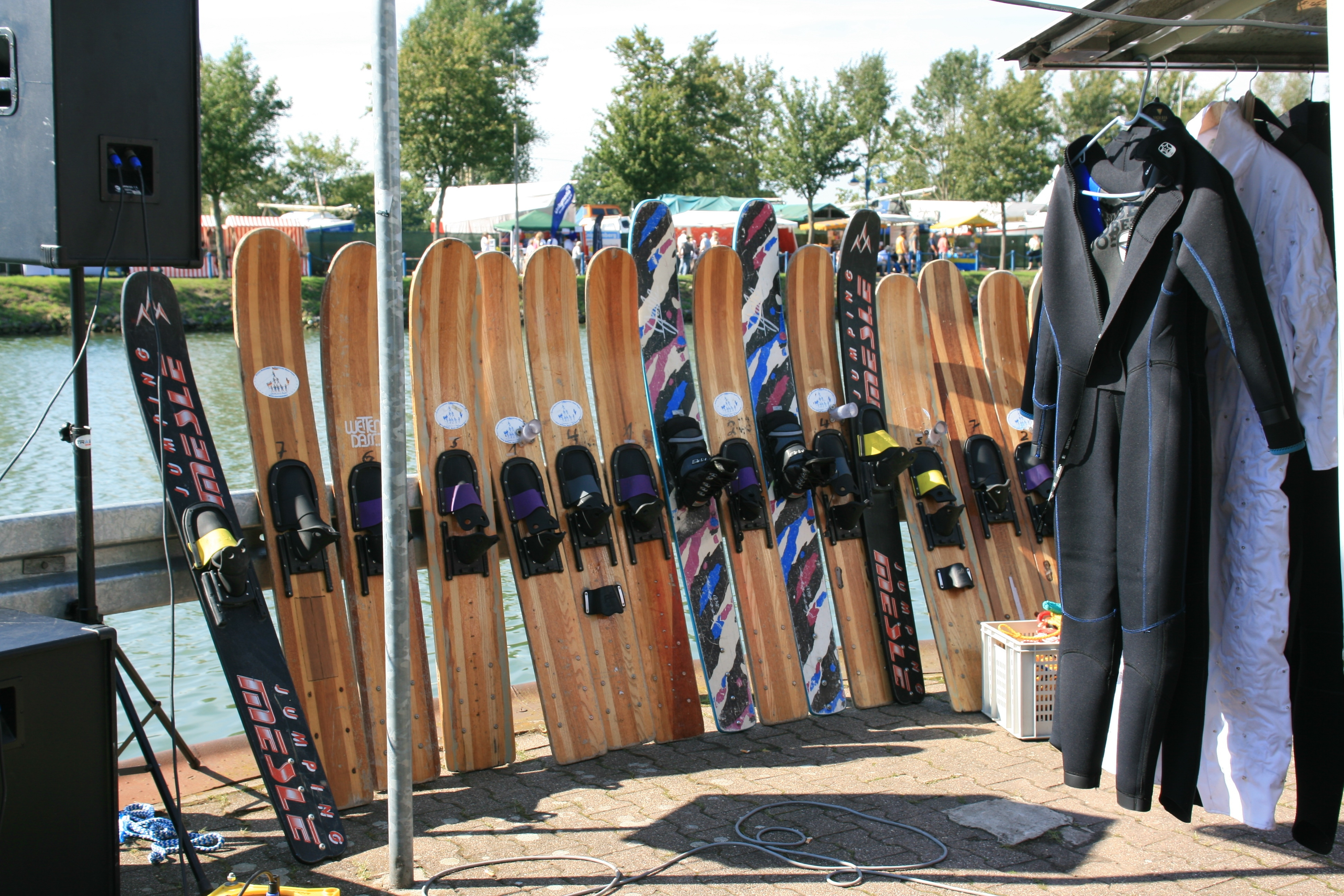
Several types of water skis and wetsuits, seen at the Kanalfestival 2011 in Datteln

Younger skiers generally start out on children's skis, which consist of two skis tied together at their back and front. These connections mean that less strength is necessary for the child to keep the skis together. Sometimes these skis can come with a handle to help balance the skier as well. Children's skis are short – usually 110–150 centimetres (45–60 in) long – reflecting the skier's smaller size. Once a person is strong enough to hold the skis together themselves there are various options depending upon their skill level and weight.

Water skiers can use two skis (one on each foot, also called "combo skiing") or one ski (dominant foot in front of the other foot, also called "slalom skiing"). Generally the heavier the person, the bigger the skis will be. Length will also vary based on the type of water skiing being performed; jump skis, for example, are longer than skis used in regular straight-line recreational skiing or competitive slalom and trick skiing. A trick ski is around 40 inches long and wider than combo skis. Again the skier rides it with his or her dominant foot in front. It has no fins which allows for spins to be performed.

Modern water skis have evolved from wooden barrels and snow skis to sophisticated composites of thermoplastics, aluminum, Kevlar, and carbon fiber. These materials make the skis not only high-performing but also sustainable, as manufacturers now use recycled materials to reduce waste and environmental impact. The incorporation of these advanced materials has led to skis that are incredibly strong, lightweight, and flexible, enhancing both performance and durability. Classic water skis are approximately 1.7 meters (5.5 feet) long and 15 centimeters (6 inches) wide, equipped with a stabilizing fin and rubber foot bindings for safety during falls. In contrast, skis used for trick or figure waterskiing are shorter, lack fins for complete rotation capability.

=== Boat ===
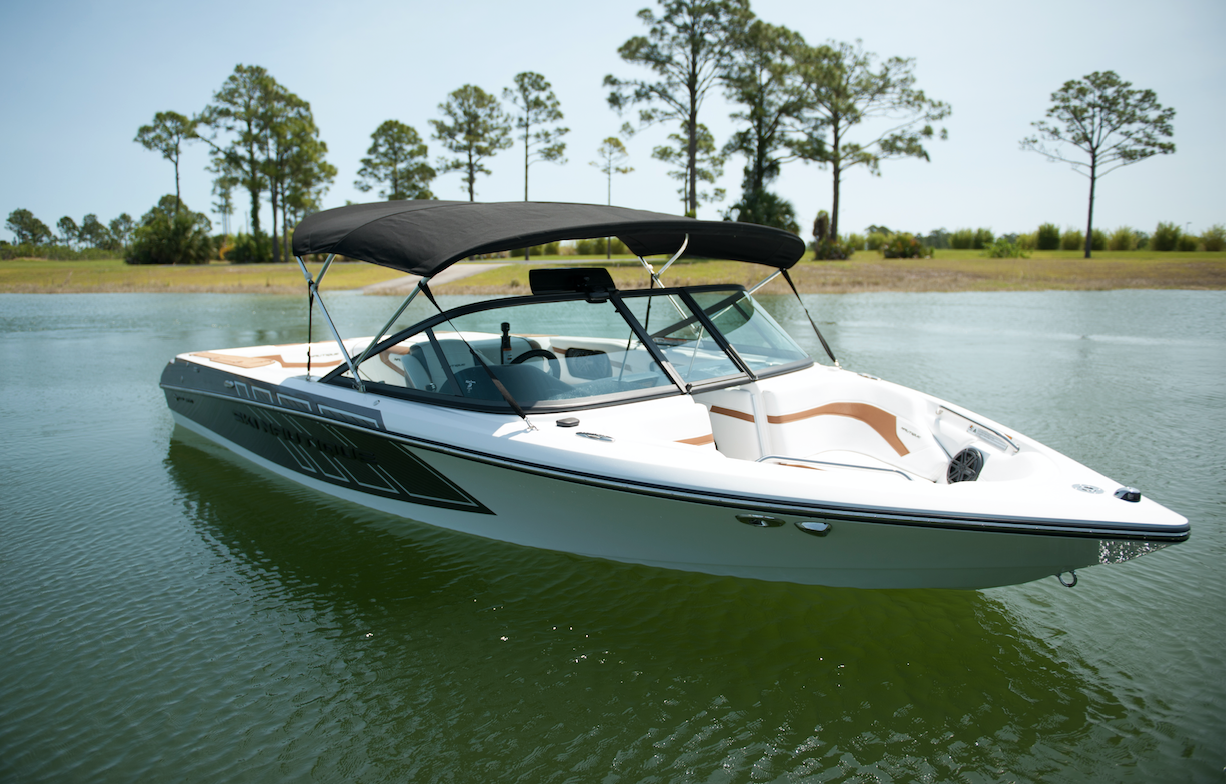
Ski Nautique 200, widely used for water skiing

Competition skiing uses specifically designed towboats. Most towboats have a very small hull and a flat bottom to minimize wake. A true tournament ski boat will have a direct drive motor shaft that centers the weight in the boat for an optimal wake shape. However, some recreational ski boats will have the motor placed in the back of the boat (v-drive), which creates a bigger wake. Permitted towboats used for tournament water skiing are the MasterCraft ProStar, Ski Nautique 200, Nautique Ski Nautique, Malibu Response TXi, and formerly the Centurion Carbon Pro. These boats have ability to pull skiers for trick skiing, jumping, and slalom.

Recreational boats can serve as water skiing platforms as well as other purposes such as cruising and fishing. Popular boat types include bowriders, deckboats, cuddy cabins, and jetboats.

The towboat must be capable of maintaining the proper speed. Speeds vary with the skier's weight, experience level, comfort level, and type of skiing. For example, a child on two skis would require speeds of 21–26 km/h (13–16 mph), whereas an adult on one ski might require as high as 58 km/h (36 mph). Barefoot skiing requires speeds of approximately 72 km/h (45 mph; 39 kn). Competition speeds have a wide range: as slow as 22 km/h (14 mph; 12 kn) up to 58 km/h (36 mph; 31 kn) for slalom water skiing, and approaching 190 km/h (120 mph; 100 kn) in water ski racing.

The boat must be equipped with a ski rope and handle. The tow rope must be sufficiently long for maneuvering, with a recommended length of 23 metres (75 ft) (within tolerance) although length varies widely depending on the type of water skiing and the skier's skill level. Competition requirements on rope construction have changed over the years, from "quarter-inch polypropylene rope" in 1992 to the 2003 flexibility as long as the same specification is used "for the entire event." The handle width and diameter sizes are based on skier preference, and the handle grip is a tough rubber material. Skiers will often wear gloves to assist in holding the handle at the higher speeds as well as keep from hurting their hands. The rope and handle are anchored to the boat and played out at the stern. This anchor point on a recreation boat is commonly a tow ring or cleat, mounted on the boat's stern. For more dedicated skiers, a metal ski pylon is placed in the center of the boat in front of the engine to connect the skier. This pylon must be mounted securely, since a skilled slalom skier can put a considerable amount of tension on the ski rope and the pylon.

== Safety measures ==
As water skiing is a potentially dangerous sport, safety is important.

There should be a 200 feet (61 m) wide skiing space and the water should be at least 5 to 6 feet (1.5 to 1.8 m) deep. The towboat should stay at least 100 feet (30 m) from docks, swim areas, and the shore, and other boats should steer clear of skiers by at least 100 feet. Without proper space and visibility skiing can be extremely dangerous. Skiers should wear a life jacket regardless of swimming ability, although the expectation that all skiers are also competent swimmers is advisable as well. Specially-designed life jackets or ski vests allow movement needed for the sport while still providing floatation for a downed or injured skier. The most common water ski injuries involve the lower legs, such as the knee, because a fall at high speed can create irregular angles of collision between the skier's body and the water surface. Another common cause of injury is colliding with objects on or near the water, like docks.

The tow boat must contain at least two people: a driver and an observer. In most locales, the observer will need to be at least 12 years of age. The driver maintains a steady course, free of obstacles to the skier. The observer continually observes the skier, relays the condition of the skier to the boat driver, and if necessary, raises the "skier down" warning flag, as required, when a skier is in the water, returning to the boat, or in some localities, the entire time the skier is out of the boat. The skier and observer should agree on a set of standard hand-signals for easy communication: stop, speed up, turn, I'm OK, skier in the water, etc.

== History ==
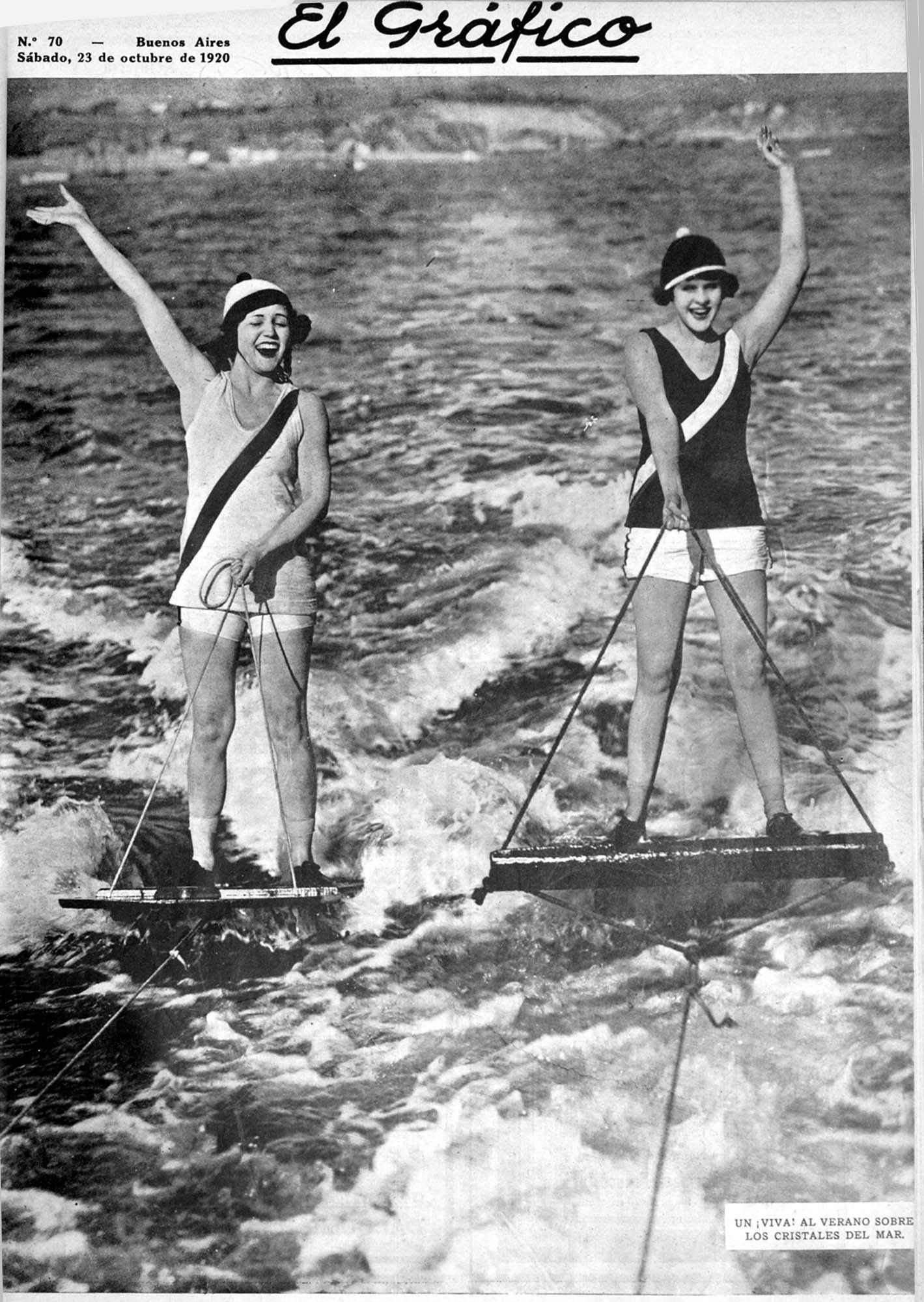
Two women aquaplaning at the sea in Argentina, on the cover of the local magazine El Gráfico published on 23 October 1920. Aquaplaning was superseded by the development of water skiing.

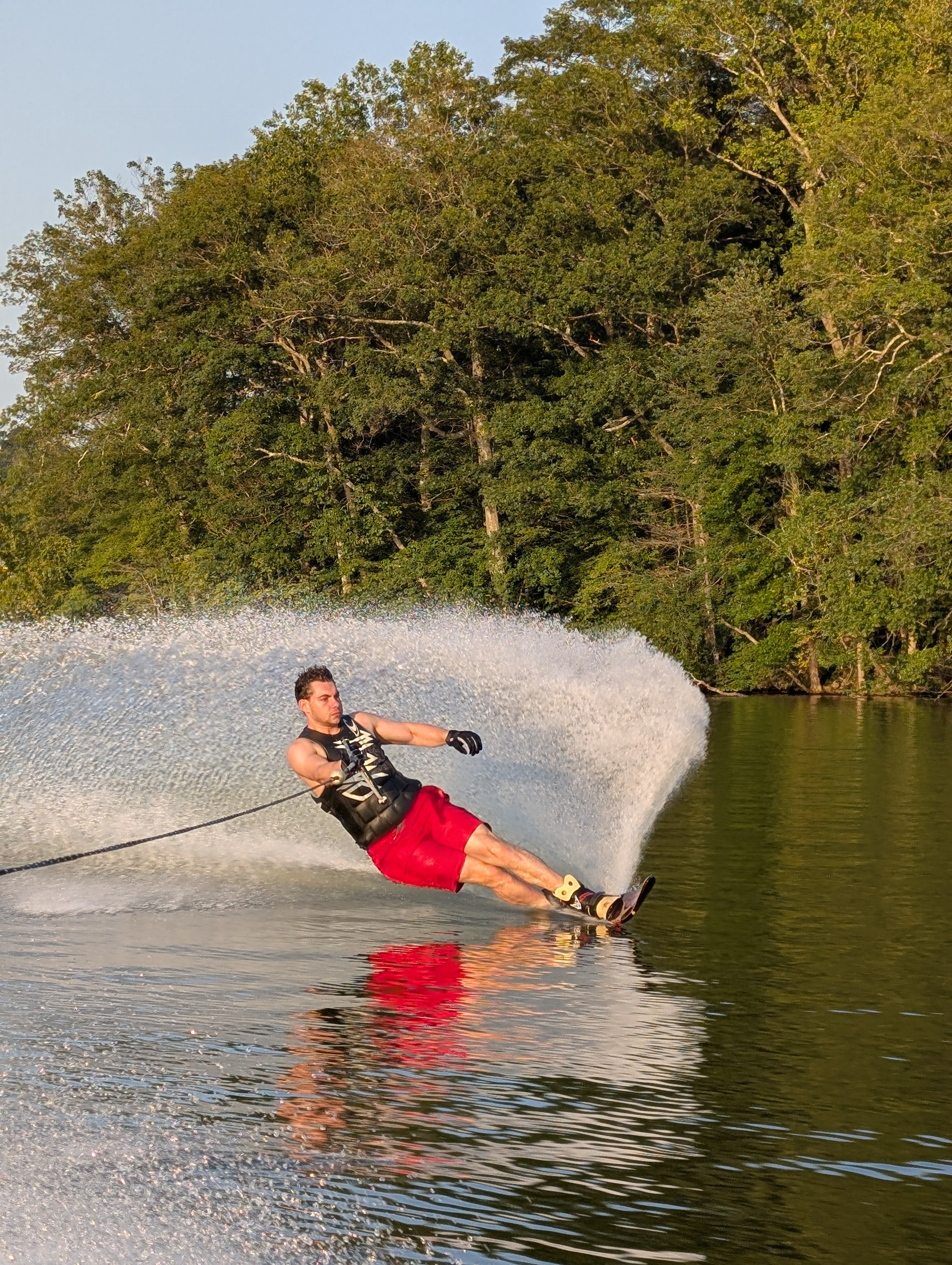
A man waterskiing on one ski (slalom style) on Kirk Lake

Water skiing was invented in 1922 when Ralph Samuelson used a pair of boards as skis and a clothesline as a towrope on Lake Pepin in Lake City, Minnesota. Samuelson experimented with different positions on the skis for several days until 2 July 1923. Samuelson discovered that leaning backwards in the water with ski tips up and poking out of the water at the tip was the optimal method. His brother Ben towed him and they reached a speed of 32 kilometres per hour (20 mph). Samuelson spent 15 years performing shows and teaching water skiing to people in the United States.

Samuelson went through several iterations of equipment in his quest to ski on water. His first equipment consisted of barrel staves for skis. He later tried snow skis, but finally fabricated his own design out of lumber with bindings made of strips of leather. The ski rope was made from a long window sash cord. Samuelson never patented any of his ski equipment.

The first patent for water skis was issued to Fred Waller, of Huntington, NY, on 27 October 1925, for skis he developed independently and marketed as "Dolphin Akwa-Skees." Waller's skis were constructed of kiln-dried mahogany, as were some boats at that time. Jack Andresen patented the first trick ski, a shorter, fin-less water ski, in 1940.

In 1928, Don Ibsen developed his own water skis out in Bellevue, Washington, never having heard of Samuelson or Waller. In 1941, Don Ibsen founded The Olympic Water Ski Club in Seattle, Washington. It was the first such club in America. Ibsen, a showman and entrepreneur, was one of the earliest manufacturers of water skis and was a leading enthusiast and promoter of the sport. In 1983, he was inducted into the Water Ski Hall of Fame in Winter Haven, Florida.

The sport of water skiing remained an obscure activity for several years after 1922, until Samuelson performed water ski shows from Michigan to Florida. The American Water Ski Association formally acknowledged Samuelson in 1966 as the first recorded water skier in history. Samuelson was also the first ski racer, slalom skier, and the first organizer of a water ski show.

Parallel to this, an avid sailor, sportsman, and early adopter of water skiing, the young Swedish engineer Gunnar Ljungström (1905–1999) pioneered water skiing in slalom moves from 1929. A demonstration behind a motorboat was made to the Swedish public at the 100th anniversary of the Royal Swedish Yacht Club in Sandhamn outside Stockholm in 1930.

Water skiing gained international attention in the hands of famed promoter, Dick Pope, Sr., often referred to as the "Father of American Water Skiing" and founder of Cypress Gardens in Winter Haven, Florida. Pope cultivated a distinct image for his theme-park, which included countless photographs of the water skiers featured at the park. These photographs began appearing in magazines worldwide in the 1940s and 1950s, helping to bring international attention to the sport for the first time. He was also the first person to complete a jump on water skis, jumping over a wooden ramp in 1928, for a distance of 25 feet. His son, Dick Pope, Jr., is the inventor of bare-foot skiing. Both men are in the Water Ski Hall of Fame. Today, Winter Haven, Florida, with its famous Chain of Lakes, remains an important city for water skiing, with several major ski schools operating there.

Water skiing has developed over time. Water skiing tournaments and water skiing competitions have been organized. As an exhibition sport, water skiing was included in the 1972 Olympics. The first National Show Ski Tournament was held in 1974, and the first ever National Intercollegiate Water Ski Championships were held in 1979. The Home CARE US National Water Ski Challenge, the first competition for people with disabilities, was organized ten years later.

The first patented design of a water ski which included carbon fiber was that of Hani Audah at SPORT labs in 2001. Its first inclusion in tournament slalom skiing was in 2003.

== Disciplines ==
=== 3-event tournament water skiing ===
In the United States, there are over 900 sanctioned water ski competitions each summer. Orlando, Florida is considered to be the competitive 3-event waterskiing capital of the world. Competitive water skiing consists of three events: slalom, jump, and trick.

==== Slalom ====
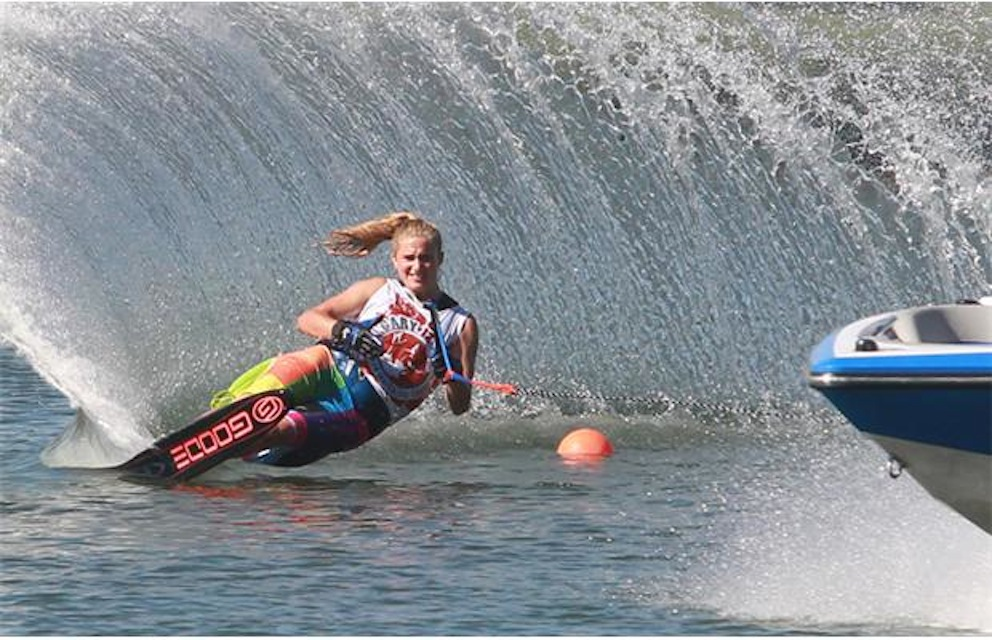
17-year-old Toronto skier Chantal Singer slaloming at the 2012 Canadian National Waterski Championships in Calgary, Alberta

In an attempt to become as agile as possible, slalom water skiers use only one ski with feet oriented forward, one in front of the other. Slalom skis are narrow and long, at 57–70 inches (145–178 cm) depending on the height and weight of the skier. The two forward-facing bindings vary: they can be made of rubber or thick plastic, and they can be designed more like a snow ski binding or more like a roller blade boot.

Slalom skiing involves a multi-buoy course that the skier must go around in order to complete the pass. A complete slalom water ski course consists of 26 buoys. There are entrance gates at the beginning and end of the course that the skier must go between, and there are 6 turn buoys that the skier must navigate around in a zigzag pattern. The remainder of the buoys are for the driver to ensure the boat goes straight down the center of the course. For a tournament to be sanctioned as 'record capable' by the International Waterski & Wakeboard Federation (IWWF), the entire course must be surveyed prior to competition by a land surveyor to ensure its accuracy. The drivers boat path must be verified as well to ensure that all skiers are getting a fair pull.

Every consecutive pass is harder than the pass before it. When a pass is completed, the boat is sped up by 3 kilometres per hour (2 mph) or the rope is shortened by specific increments. The rope is usually not shortened until the maximum speed has been reached for the division, based on the skier's gender and age (55 kilometres per hour (34 mph) for women and 58 kilometres per hour (36 mph) for men). In a tournament, the boat speeds up or the rope shortens until the skier fails to complete the slalom course by falling, not getting around a buoy, or missing an entrance or exit gate.

A skier's score is based upon the number of successful buoys cleared, the speed of the boat, and the length of the rope. In a tournament, skiers choose the starting boat speed and rope length (with a maximum length of 22.86 metres (75 ft)). Professional water skiers will typically start at the max speed of 58 kilometres per hour (36 mph) with a rope that has already been shortened to 13 metres (43 ft). The skier with the most buoys wins the competition.

The turn buoys are positioned 11.5 metres (38 ft) away from the center of the slalom course. As the rope is shortened beyond that, the skiers are required to use the momentum generated through their turns to swing up on the side of the boat and reach out in order to get their ski around the next buoy. At these rope lengths, the skier's body is experiencing intense isometric contractions and extreme upper body torque with loads of up to 600 kg as they begin accelerating after rounding a turn buoy. Their top speeds will generally be more than double the boat's speed, which means that the Pro men can reach speeds in excess of 116 kilometres per hour (72 mph) and each turn will generally generate around 4 g of force. Essentially, slalom water skiers are using their body as a lever, which allows them to withstand loads that would otherwise not be possible for the human body.

==== Jump ====
Water ski jumpers use two long skis to ride over a water ski jump in an attempt to travel the longest distance. In a tournament, skiers are given three attempts to hit the ramp. The winner is the skier who travels the farthest calculated distance and successfully rides away. There are no style points, simply distance.

Water ski jumps have specific dimensions and the ramp height is adjustable. Skiers may choose their boat speed and ramp height, although there are maximums based on the skier's gender and age. Professional ski jumpers have a maximum boat speed of 58 km/h (36 mph; 31 kn). The ramp height must be between 1.5 and 1.8 m (5 and 6 ft). As a professional jumper approaches the ramp they will zigzag behind the boat in a series of cuts to generate speed and angle. When the jumper hits the ramp they will generally be going over 112 kilometres per hour (70 mph) and the load they have generated on the rope can be over 600 kilograms (1,300 lb).

==== Trick ====
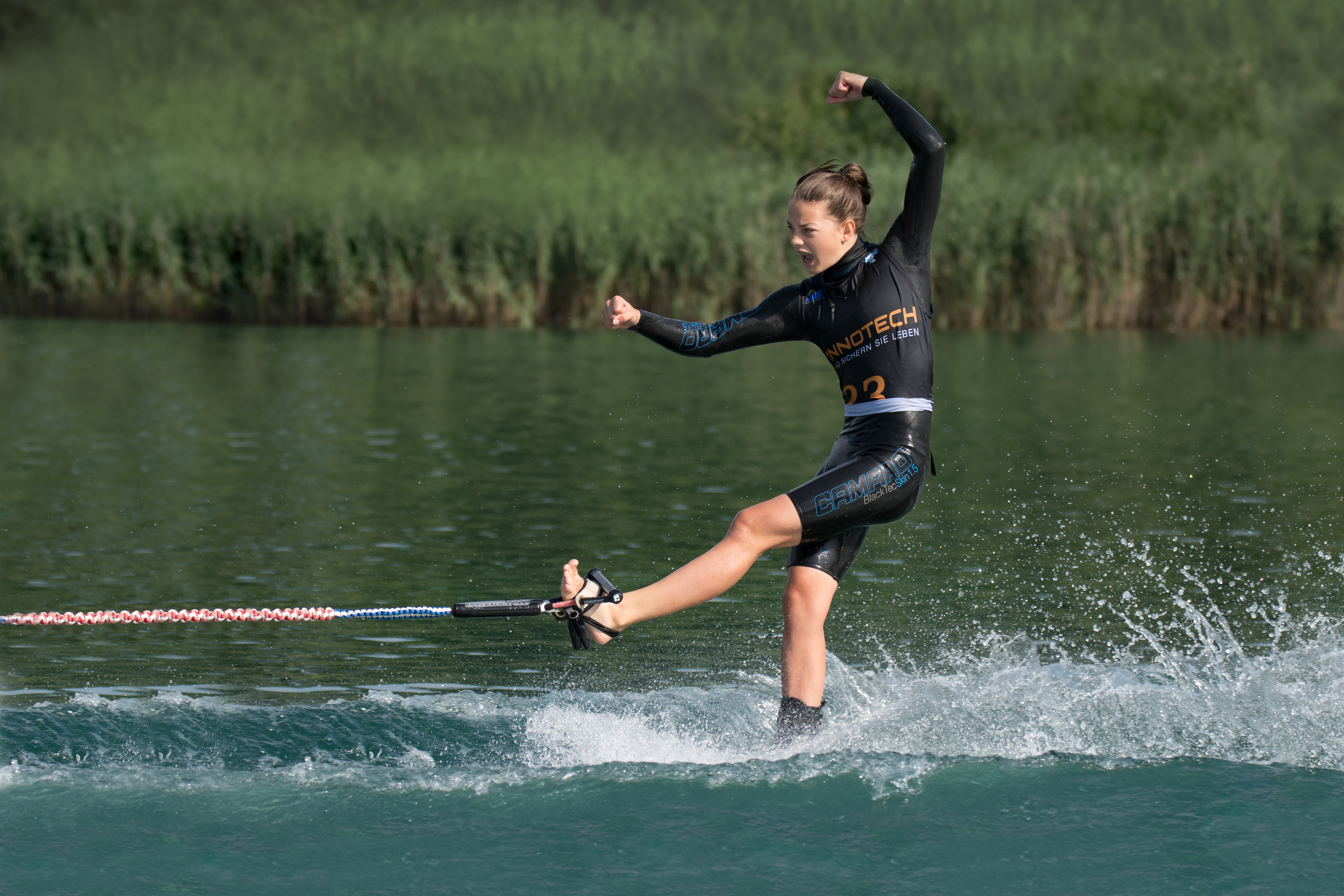
A competitor at a trick skiing event in Austria in 2017

The Trick competition has been described as the most technical of the three classic water skiing events.

Trick skiing uses small, oval-shaped or oblong water skis. Beginners generally use two skis while more advanced skiers use one. The shorter, wider Trick ski has a front binding facing forward and a back binding facing at a 45°. It has a smooth bottom that allows it to turn over the surface of the water. According to official 2013 Tournament Rules for 3-event competition in the United States and the Pan-Am Games, skis used in the Tricks event must be a single ski without fins, although molded rails/grooves less than 6.4 mm (1/4 in) are allowed, as are a foot pad cemented to the ski as a place for the rear foot; in addition, the ski must float with all bindings, fins, etc., installed. The ski's configuration allows the skier to perform both surface and air tricks in quick succession.

In a tournament, skiers are given two 20-second runs during which they perform a series of their chosen tricks. In most cases, one pass is for hand tricks, which includes surface turns, rotations over the wake, and flips. The second pass is for toe tricks, which are done by doing wake turns and rotations with only a foot attaching them to the handle; the foot is either in the toehold part of the handle or, professionally, attached to the rope. The toehold part of the handle does not allow the skier to let go of the handle if they lose their balance and fall into the water, therefore a person in the boat is required to release the rope from the boat using a quick release mechanism installed on the ski pylon. A trick cannot be repeated. Each trick has a point value. A panel of five judges assesses which tricks were completed correctly and assigns that predetermined point value to each successfully completed trick. The skier with the most points wins.

=== Barefoot water skiing ===
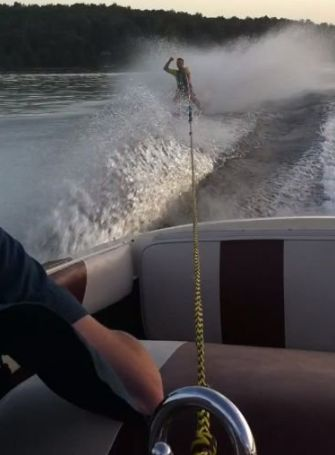
Barefoot skiing on Lake Ozonia in the Adirondacks

A barefoot water skier should use a wetsuit instead of a life jacket because the wetsuit covers more of the body in case of a fall at high speed. The wetsuit also allows the skier to do starts in the water where they lie on their back. Unlike a normal life jacket, the "barefoot wetsuit" allows the skier to glide on their back on top of the water once they reach a high enough speed. The barefoot wetsuit is generally thicker in the back, rear, and chest for flotation and impact absorption.

Barefoot skiing requires a higher speed because the skier's feet are smaller than skis, providing less lift. A rule of thumb for barefoot water skiing speed in miles per hour is (M/10)+18=S, where M equals the skier's weight in pounds. In other words, a 175 lb (79 kg) person would have to divide 175/10, which is 17.5; then simply add 17.5+18 which equals 35.5 miles per hour (57.1 km/h).

Another tool used in barefoot water skiing is the barefoot boom. It provides a stable aluminum bar on the side of the boat where a short rope can be attached or the skier can grip the bar itself. The skier is within earshot of the people in the boat, providing a good platform for teaching. Once the bare footer is good enough, he/she will go behind the boat with a long rope.

A beginner can wear shoes to decrease the necessary speed, lessen foot injury from choppy water, learn better technique, and master the sport.

=== Show skiing ===
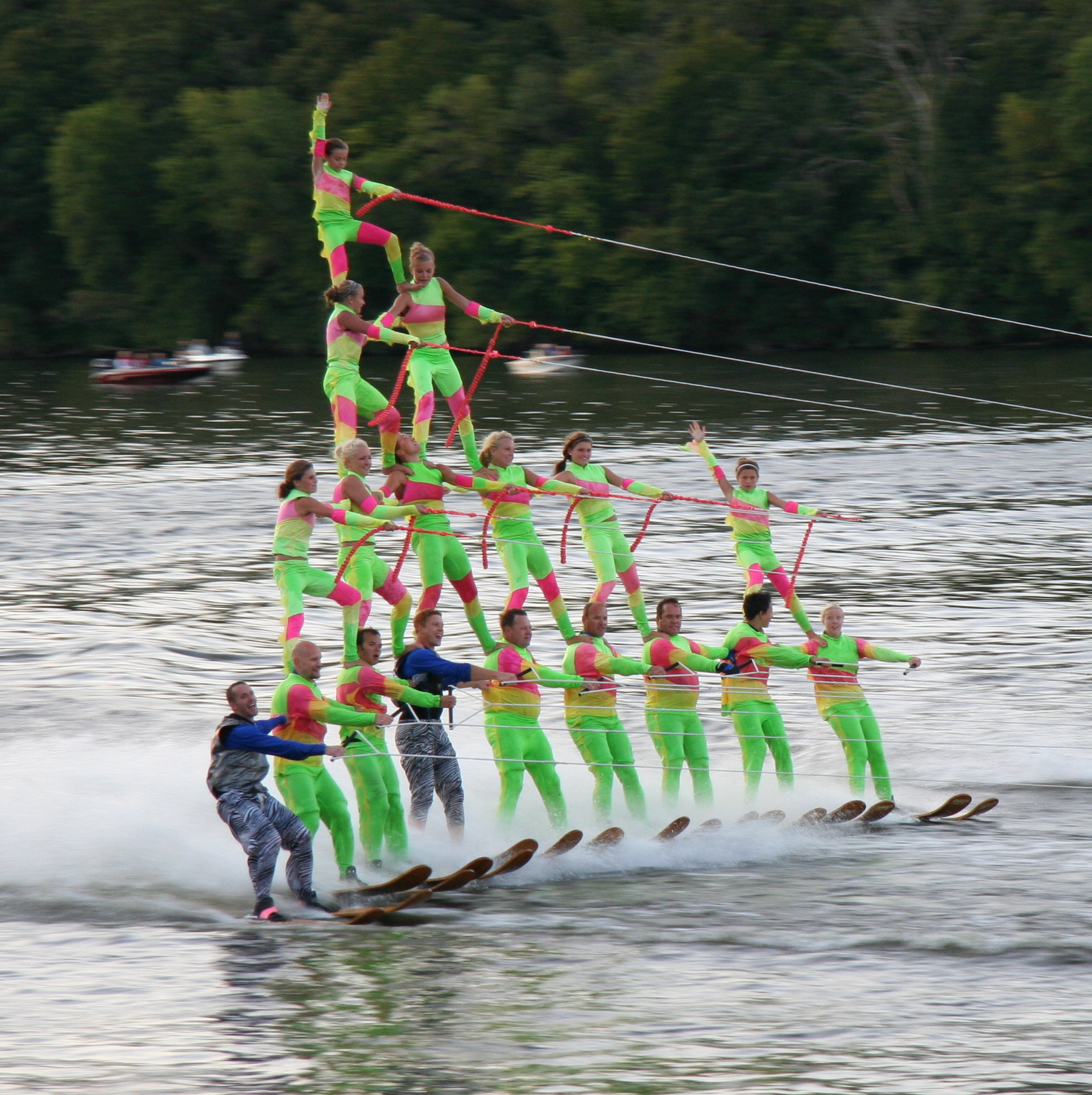
Water ski pyramid with 18 skiers Lake Zumbro, Minnesota, August 2010

Show skiing is a type of water skiing where skiers perform tricks somewhat similar to those of gymnasts while being pulled by the boat. Traditional ski show acts include pyramids, ski doubles, freestyle jumping, and swivel skiing. Show skiing is normally performed in water ski shows, with elaborate costumes, choreography, music, and an announcer. Show teams may also compete regionally or nationally. In the US, each team member must be a member of USA Water Ski to compete.

The first organized show occurred in 1928. The bi-annual World Show Ski Championship was inaugurated in September 2012 in Janesville, Wisconsin. Past competition included teams from Australia, Belgium, Canada, China, and the United States.

Wisconsin is known as the, "Water Ski Capital of the World." The largest and longest running water ski competition is held every summer in Wisconsin Rapids.

=== Freestyle jumping ===
Freestyle jumping is often related to show skiing. The goal is to go off the jump, perform one of many stunts, and successfully land back on the water. The most common freestyle stunts – in order of usual progression – would be a heli (360°), a flip (forwards), a gainer (a back flip), and a möbius (back flip with 360°).

=== Ski racing ===
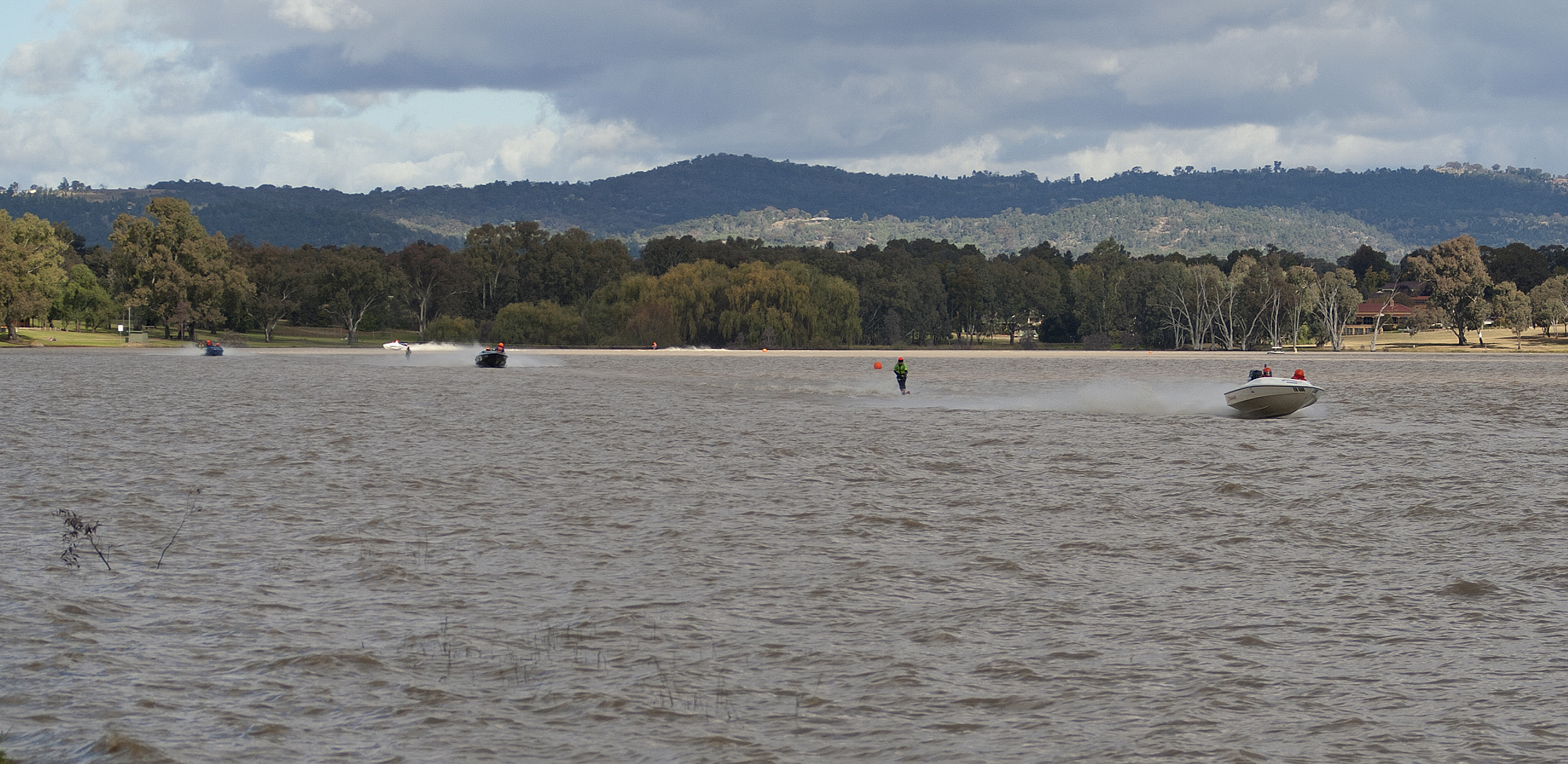
Ski racing in Australia

Water ski racing consists of 1 or 2 skiers per boat who race around a set course behind boats set up for this type of event. It can occur in a 'circle' or lap format type racing or on river courses offering longer distances and higher speeds. Races can be timed events such as 20 minute races and up to 1 hour or on courses where race distance can be over 100 km in length.

Speeds vary by classes but can reach up to 200 km/h. Boats can be inboards or outboards and are generally between 19 and 21 feet in length. Outboards are commonly 300 hp and inboards around 1,300 hp.

Current format world championship racing involves men's and women's open (unrestricted), and men's and women formula 2 (limited to single rig, 300 hp outboards, as well as junior classes for under 17's. The World Championships are held every 2 years with the most recent being 2019 in Vichy, France.

Major events include the Southern 80 (Echuca Victoria Australia), the Diamond Race (Viersel Belgium), the Catalina ski race (Long Beach CA United States), and the Bridge to Bridge (Sydney Australia). Races can have anywhere from 10 boats to 150 boats competing (grouped by engine size and age classes).

=== Disabled ===
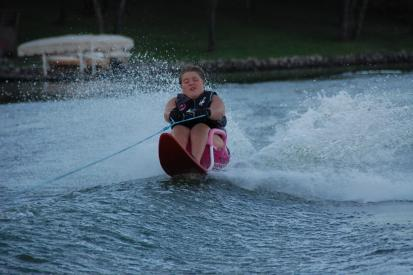
A disabled water skier on a slalom sit ski

Disabled water skiing uses equipment or other adaptations to allow disabled people to compete in standard 3 event skiing. Seated water skis, special handles, audio slalom gear, and other adaptations are all used for different disabilities.

== Criticism ==
While water skiing is very popular, it is not universally liked. The fast, powerful boats create noise, cause waves which can cause beach erosion, and sometimes hit swimmers, other boats, or marine life. People operating boats may drink alcohol, which increases the chance of accidents. Water skiing is also criticized for air pollution from the boats' engines, and the unnecessary use of fuel (usually gasoline) and the consequent impact to climate change.

== See also ==
- Aquaplaning (sport)
- George A. Blair ("Banana George")
- Cable skiing
- List of U.S. Open of Water Skiing champions
- List of Water Ski World Championships champions
- List of Water Skiing European Champions
- List of members of the Water Ski Hall of Fame
- Masters Water Ski Tournament
- Moomba Masters Champions
- Queenie (waterskiing elephant)
- Twiggy the Water-Skiing Squirrel
- U.S. Professional Water Ski Tour
- Water Ski World Championships
