= Centurion Boats =

American boat manufacturer

Centurion
- Company type: Private Company
- Industry: Marine industry
- Founded: 1976
- Headquarters: Merced, California, U.S.
- Key people: Rick and Pam Lee
- Products: Wakeboard boat
- Parent: Correct Craft
- Website: centurionboats.com

Centurion Boats, owned by Fineline Industries, is a manufacturer specializing in the production of water sports boats, primarily tow boats for wakesurfing and wakeboarding. It was founded by current owner Rick Lee. Its headquarters and manufacturing operations are in Merced, California.

== History ==
Centurion Boats was founded by Rick and Pam Lee. They acquired the trade name from a Salt Lake City company, and took their first order by phone in 1976. The first products were inboard ski boats, which were produced in a leased 10,000 square foot facility in Southern California. In 1986 the first V-Drive ski boat was brought to market.

As business increased, the facility was expanded to 121,000 sq feet, set on about six acres, including a test lake for research and development. Centurion later manufactured mainly boats designed for Wakeboarding and Wakesurfing.

In 1990 the company developed C.A.T. fins, and by 1992 they had developed a computerized management system to monitor and control boats' features and performance. In 1995 Centurion began manufacturing 'The Wave', a boat specifically designed to create large wakes for Wakeboarding and Wakesurfing.

By 1997 the new UCS construction system was introduced, eliminating wood from the boat structure. In 2003, Centurion introduced the Tsunami model, a cabin cruiser with a large fuel tank.

Centurion developed sideswipe exhaust in 2003. The Avalanche model for wake riding and the similar but smaller V-Drive Cyclone model were introduced in 2004.

After developing VTF Fins in 2005, Centurion collaborated with NASCAR in 2007 to produce a series of licensed waterskiing boats.

For several years Centurion sponsored the Watkins Glen sprint racecourse, leading to the unusual title "Centurion Boats at the Glen".

In 2015 the Correct Craft company bought a majority interest in Centurion Boats.

== Current models ==
As of 2013, the company's best-selling line was the Centurion Enzo, a V-Drive tow boat geared towards producing Wakesurfing waves. That year an Enzo was the official towboat of the World Wake Surfing Championship. Another newer model was the Avalanche C4, a V-Drive boat for both wakesurfing and wakeboarding. The Elite V C4 model is a less expensive V-Drive boat, with a narrower beam and shallower draft. The Carbon Pro is an inboard ski towboat, geared towards tournament ski competition performance.
