= Ski Nautique =

Brand of tow boats by Correct Craft

Ski Nautique is a line of water ski tow boats produced by Correct Craft. Ski Nautique is the oldest brand of dedicated water ski boats, with the first example having been built in 1959. Along with MasterCraft and Malibu, Nautique is one of three boats used in professional water ski tournaments.

== History ==
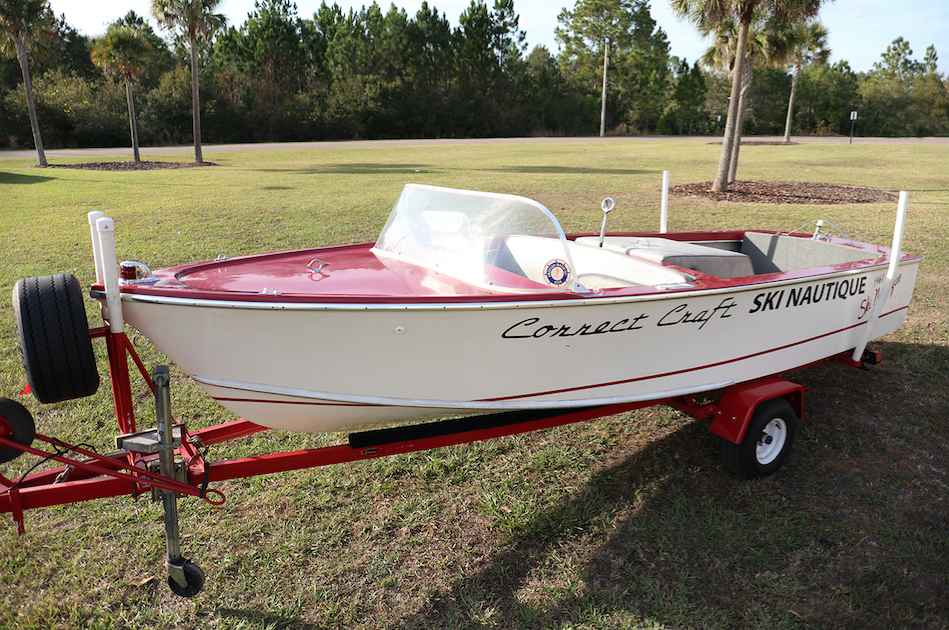
1961 Correct Craft Ski Nautique. This was the first year of regular production.

In the early days of water skiing, the preferred boats of skiers were inboards built by Chris-Craft, Century Resorter, and Correct Craft. Among these, the Correct Craft Atom Skier was the most popular. However, these boats produced wakes that were larger than desirable. The 1950s saw the advent of the twin outboard boat, which quickly took the place of inboards for tournament use. The version produced by Crosby (later Hydrodyne) was the most widely used ski boat of the era. However, twin outboards were difficult to set up and had high fuel consumption.

During the late 1950s, Leo Bentz ran a water ski school in Miami Beach, and was dissatisfied with the boats available at the time. In September 1959, Bentz and his wife attended the Water Ski World Championships in Milan, Italy. Following the tournament the couple took a holiday at the French Riviera. While in France, the Bentzes visited a water ski school called L'école de Ski Nautique. Upon his return to the States, Bentz produced his first Prototype Ski Nautique, named after the school in France. He subsequently contracted the work for 12 production boats and sold them using the company name Glass Craft. Bentz's creation – a fibreglass inboard – was a novel concept. In the spring of 1960 at the Southern Regional[[]] Championships in Birmingham, Alabama, Bentz made the first showing of his creation.

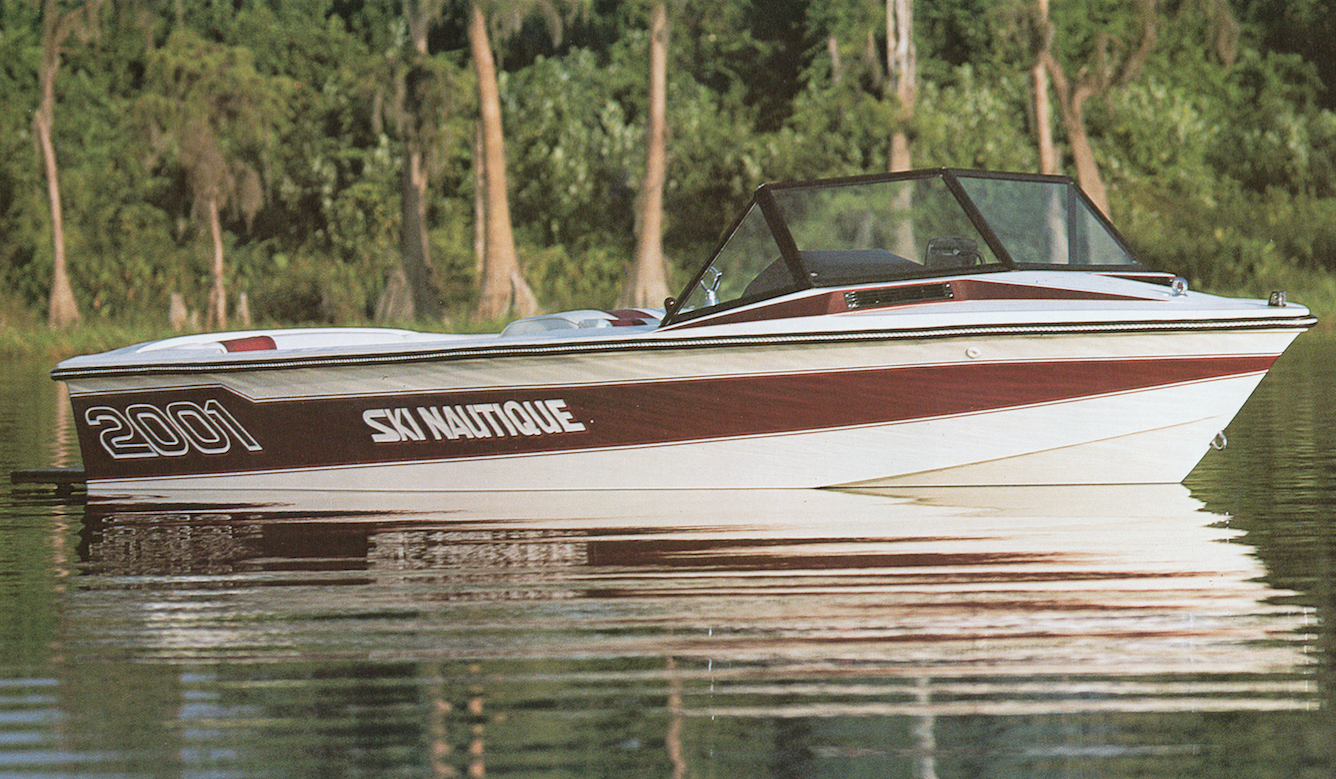
1988 Ski Nautique "2001." This model was released in 1981.

In the spring of 1961 Bentz had had enough of producing boats. He approached Correct Craft, based in Pine Castle, Florida, about selling his design. Correct Craft had been founded in 1925 by Walter C. Meloon as the Florida Variety Boat Company, before changing its name in 1930 to the Pine Castle Boat and Construction Company, and then in 1936 to Correct Craft. Meloon rejected Bentz's proposal to sell the Ski Nautique mould, which would have cost $10,000. However, after hearing testimonies from skiers about the quality of the Ski Nautique, Meloon visited Bentz several months later and offered to purchase the design. Bentz agreed and sold the mould to Meloon. As part of the deal, Bentz received a free boat with three years of maintenance, and Correct Craft assumed servicing responsibility for the 12 boats Bentz had already produced and sold.

As the 1960s progressed, the Correct Craft Ski Nautique quickly became the preeminent tow boat for competition water skiing. Correct Craft maintained a virtual monopoly on the ski boat market until 1968 when Rob Shirley, a former teacher at Bentz's ski school, founded MasterCraft. In 1975 the model became the official boat of the Masters, and in 1975 Correct Craft founded its own ski team. In 1981 the company released the new 2001 model, which remained in production for many years. For Correct Craft's 85th birthday in 2010, the company released the 200 model, which remains in production today.
