= Ford small block engine =

Ford small block
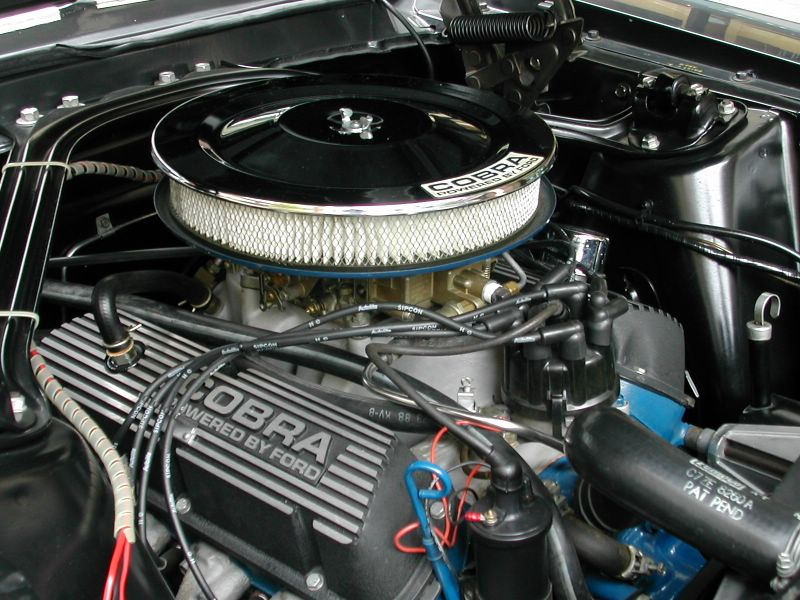
- 289 K-code in a Shelby GT350

Overview
- Manufacturer: Ford Motor Company
- Also called: Windsor V8 (informal); Challenger V8
- Production: July 1961 – 2002

Layout
- Configuration: Naturally aspirated 90° V8
- Displacement: 221 cu in (3.6 L); 255 cu in (4.2 L); 260 cu in (4.3 L); 289 cu in (4.7 L); 302 cu in (4.9 L) [marketed as 5.0]; 351 cu in (5.8 L)
- Cylinder bore: 4.000" (289, 302, 351W); 3.800" (260); 3.680" (255); 3.500" (221)
- Piston stroke: 3.500" (351W); 3.000" (302 & 255); 2.870" (221, 260, 289)
- Cylinder block material: Cast iron; Deck height: 9.480" (1969–70 351W); 9.503" (1971–96 351W); 8.201–8.210" (BOSS 302); 8.206" (221, 260, 289, 302)
- Cylinder head material: Cast iron
- Valvetrain: Pushrod OHV; Cast iron cam, Flat tappet (1962–84 302, 1969–93 351W); Steel roller cam & lifters (1985–2001 302, 1994–97 351W)
- Compression ratio: 9.0:1, 9.5:1, 10.5:1, 8.8:1, 8:1

Combustion
- Fuel system: Carbureted (1962–1985 302, 1969–1991 351W); EFI (1988–1997 351W, 1986–2001 all others)
- Fuel type: 87 Octane
- Oil system: Wet sump
- Cooling system: Water-cooled; jacketed block

Output
- Power output: 115–310 hp (86–231 kW)
- Torque output: 262–385 lb⋅ft (355–522 N⋅m)

Dimensions
- Length: 27.50" (302, 351W) (Note: With 2001 Explorer–style water pump kit (Ford part M-8501-A50). Blocks with older pumps are 1.25" longer.)
- Width: 21.00" (351W); 18.75" (302)
- Height: 23.75" (351W) (Note: Ford measures engine height here from the bottom of the oil pan to the top of valve covers, excluding any breathers or oil fill tubes.); 20.75" (302)

Chronology
- Predecessor: Ford Y-block engine
- Successor: Ford Modular engine

The Ford small-block is a series of 90° overhead valve small-block V8 automobile engines manufactured by the Ford Motor Company from July 1961 to December 2000.

Designed as a successor to the Ford Y-block engine, it was first installed in the 1962 model year Ford Fairlane and Mercury Meteor. Originally produced with a displacement of 221 cu in (3.6 L), it eventually increased to 351 cu in (5.8 L) with a taller deck height, but was most commonly sold (from 1968 to 2001) with a displacement of 302 cubic inches (later marketed as the 5.0 L).

The small-block was installed in several of Ford's product lines, including the Ford Mustang, Mercury Cougar, Ford Torino, Ford Granada, Mercury Monarch, Ford LTD, Mercury Marquis, Ford Maverick, Ford Explorer, Mercury Mountaineer, and Ford F-Series truck.

For the 1991 model year, Ford began phasing in the Modular V8 engine to replace the small-block, beginning in late 1990 with the Lincoln Town Car and continuing through the decade. The 2001 Ford Explorer SUV was the last North American installation of the engine, and Ford Australia used it through 2002 in the Falcon and Fairlane.

Although sometimes called the "Windsor" by enthusiasts, Ford never used that designation for the engine line as a whole; it was only adopted well into its run to distinguish the 351 cu in (5.8 L) version from the 351 cu in (5.8 L) "Cleveland" version of the 335-family engine that had the same displacement but a significantly different configuration, and only ever used to refer to that specific engine. The designations for each were derived from the original locations of manufacture: Windsor, Ontario and Cleveland, Ohio.

As of June 2025, versions of the small-block remain available for purchase from Ford Performance Parts as crate engines.

== Overview ==
The small-block V8 engine was introduced in the 1962 Ford Fairlane and Mercury Meteor cars. Displacing 221 cu in (3.6 L), it was designed to save weight, using thin-wall casting for a short-skirt block that does not extend below the centerline of the crankshaft. The engine uses a separate aluminum timing chain cover, which differentiates it from the later Ford 335-series engines that use an integrated timing cover. All Ford small-block engines use two-valve-per-cylinder heads, with "2V" and "4V" designations indicating the number of barrels (or venturi) in the carburetor. The valves are in-line and use straight, six-bolt valve covers. Coolant is routed out of the block through the intake manifold.

The design was soon bored to 260 cu in (4.3 L) and again to 289 cu in (4.7 L), then stroked to 302 cu in (4.9 L), settling on the most common displacement offered until the engine's retirement in 2001, nearly 40 years after the basic block design debuted. Two additional displacements were produced during the engine's history. A 351 cu in (5.8 L) model was offered from 1969 until 1996. The 351W (so named to distinguish it from the 335-series Cleveland-produced 351C) has a taller deck height than the other engines in the series to avoid excessively short connecting rods. And for a brief time in the early 1980s, a version with a smaller bore diameter that displaced 255 cubic inches (4.2 L) was produced as Ford struggled with emissions and fuel economy.

In response to the Chevrolet Camaro's success in the SCCA Trans-Am Series, Ford engineers developed a new racing engine from the small block. The first attempt mated a tunnel-port head to a 289 cubic inch block, but the displacement proved to be too small to deliver the desired power. The next iteration of the engine mated an improved head design to the 302 cubic inch block, producing the famous "Boss 302". The heads from the Boss 302 became the production heads on the 335-series 351 cu in (5.8 L) "Cleveland" engines, which used the same bore spacing and head bolt configuration as the small block engines.

As the 1980s drew to a close, Ford began designing a new OHC V8 to replace the small block. The Modular 4.6 L OHC V8 debuted in the 1991 Lincoln Town Car, signaling the eventual demise of the OHV Ford small-block. Through the rest of the decade, Ford gradually shifted V8 applications to the Modular engine, with the Mustang transitioning in 1996. Even as the small-block neared the end of its life, development continued, with new cylinder heads introduced for the Ford Explorer in 1997. American sales in new vehicles ended with the 2001 Ford Explorer, but the engine continues to be offered for sale as a crate engine from Ford Racing and Performance Parts.

=== Design changes ===
All 221, 260, and 289 engines built from July 1961 through August 1964 used a five-bolt bell housing, with all 221s and 260s being of this configuration, while 289s made after August 1964 changed to the six-bolt pattern – a change made to resolve transmission utilization issues, such as the need for larger-diameter clutches.

The block mount pads and the cylinder wall contour of the 221 and 260 engines changed in January–February 1963 with the introduction of the 289 variant – all 221 and 260 engine blocks up to this time featured "corrugated wall" construction with two core plugs on the side of each bank and engine mount hole pitch distances of 6 inch.

All three block variants from this point on featured the straight wall method of construction, three core plugs, and an engine mount hole pitch distance of seven inches. The corrugated wall method of block construction had caused cleaning difficulties in the foundry from day one and a change was phased in.

== 221 ==
The first version of Ford's modern Ford small block family was called the Fairlane V8, and was introduced for the 1962 model year as an option on the Fairlane and Meteor. It had a displacement of 221 cu in (3.6 L), from a 3.5 in (89 mm) bore and 2.87 in (73 mm) stroke, with wedge combustion chambers and a two-barrel (2V) carburetor. An advanced, compact, thinwall-casting design, it was 24" wide, 29" long, and 27.5" tall (610 mm × 737 mm × 699 mm). It weighed only 470 lb (210 kg) dry despite its cast iron construction, making it the lightest and most compact V8 engine of its type of the era.

In stock form, it has a two-barrel carburetor and a compression ratio of 8.7:1, permitting the use of regular rather than premium gasoline. Valve diameters were 1.59 in (40 mm) (intake) and 1.388 in (35.3 mm) (exhaust). Rated power and torque (SAE gross) were 145 hp (108 kW) at 4,400 rpm and 216 lb⋅ft (293 N⋅m) at 2,200 rpm.

The 221 was phased out at the end of May 1963 due to lackluster demand following the mid-'62 introduction of the 260 cu in (4.3 L) "Challenger" V8 based on it. About 371,000 had been produced.

== 255 ==
In the late 1970s, an urgent need to meet EPA CAFE standards led to the creation of the 255 cu in (4.2 L) version for the 1980 model year, essentially a 302 with the cylinder bores reduced to 3.68 in (93.5 mm). The 302 was to be phased out and the 255 was to be an interim engine which would remain until the new V6 was in production. Rated power (SAE net) was 115–122 hp (86–91 kW), depending on year and application. Cylinder heads, which were specific to this engine, used smaller combustion chambers and valves, and the intake ports were oval whereas the others were all rectangular. The only externally visible clue was the use of an open-runner intake manifold with a stamped-steel lifter valley cover attached to its underside, reminiscent of previous-generation V8 engines, such as the Y-block and the MEL.

It was optional in Fox-chassis cars including the Mustang and Mercury Capri, Thunderbird, and Fairmont, and was standard equipment in the Ford LTD. Some variants, such as the one used in the Mercury Grand Marquis, were fitted with a variable-venturi carburetor and were capable of highway fuel economy in excess of 27 mpg_{‑US} (11 km/L; 32 mpg_{‑imp}). Due to its dismal overall performance, the 255 was dropped at the end the 1982 model year with 253,000 units manufactured. 302 production continued and the plans to phase it out were dropped.

Applications:

- 1980–1981 Ford Fairmont
- 1981–1982 Ford F-100
- 1981–1982 Ford Granada
- 1981–1982 Ford LTD
- 1980–1982 Ford Mustang
- 1980–1982 Ford Thunderbird
- 1980–1982 Mercury Capri
- 1980–1982 Mercury Cougar
- 1981–1982 Mercury Marquis
- 1980–1981 Mercury Zephyr

== 260 ==
The 260 was the second version of the Fairlane V8, introduced during the middle of the 1962 model year (March 1962) and given the name Challenger. It used the same block as the 221, and the same two-barrel (2V) carburetor, with displacement increased to 260 cu in (4.3 L) by expanding its bore to 3.80 in (97 mm). Compression ratio was raised fractionally to 8.8:1. The engine was slightly heavier than the 221, at 482 lb (219 kg). Rated power (still SAE gross at the time) rose to 164 hp (122 kW) at 4400 rpm, with a peak torque of 258 lb⋅ft (350 N⋅m) at 2200 rpm.

For the 1962 and 1963 model years, the valve head diameters remained the same as the 221, but for the 1964 model year, they were enlarged to 1.67 in (42.4 mm) (intake) and 1.45 in (37 mm) (exhaust) – a manufacturing economy measure so that both 260 and 289 engines could use the same valves. Although the engine breathed better, and was capable of producing marginally more power, rated power was unchanged.

In 1963, the 260 became the base engine on full-sized Ford sedans. Later in the model year, its availability was expanded to the Ford Falcon and Mercury Comet. The early "1964½" Mustang also offered the 260.

Ford ceased production of the 260 at the end of the 1964 model year with approximately 604,000 units having been made.

=== XHP-260 ===
The special rally version of the Falcon and Comet and early AC Cobra sports cars of 1962 used a high-performance version of the 260 with higher compression, hotter camshaft timing, upgraded connecting rods, valves with larger diameter valve stems, stronger valve springs and a four-barrel carburetor. This engine was rated (SAE gross) 260 hp (194 kW) at 5800 rpm and 269 lb⋅ft (365 N⋅m) at 4800 rpm . This engine was termed the HP-260 by Ford and was specifically made for Carroll Shelby. About 100 were produced.

=== Sunbeam Tiger ===
The 1964–1966 Sunbeam Tiger Mk I used the 260.

Early 1967 Sunbeam Tiger Mk IIs were fitted the 260 until inventory of that engine ran out, after which it was replaced by the 289 cubic inch V8.

== 289 ==
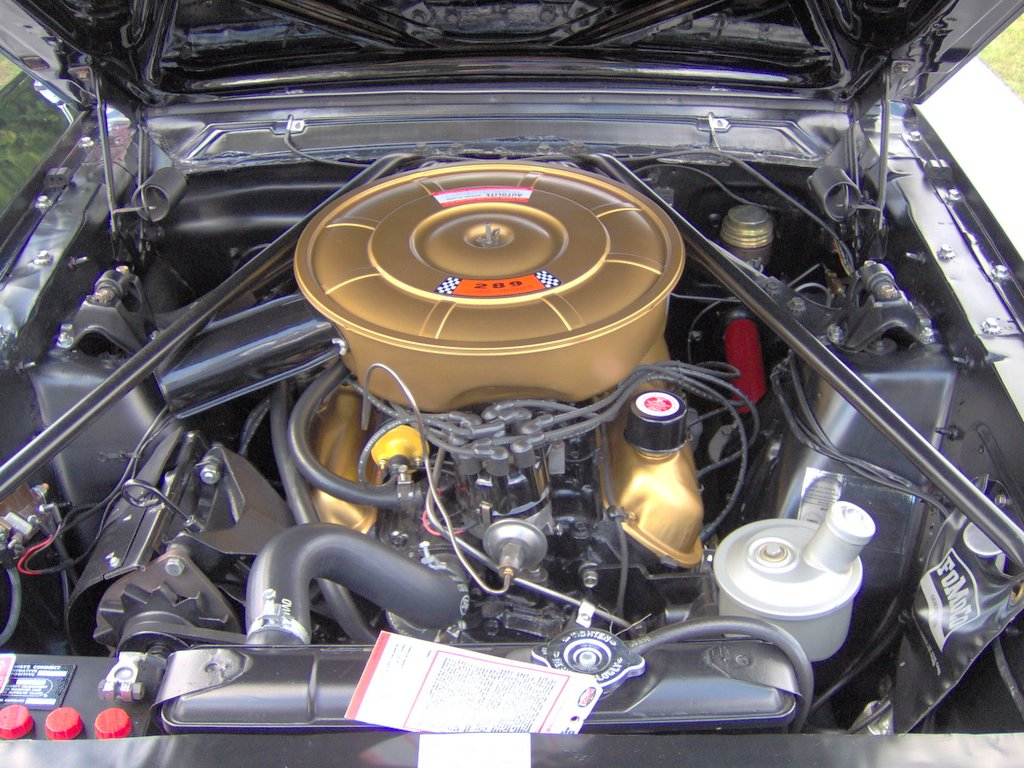
A 289 Ford small-block V8 in a 1965 Ford Mustang

The 289 cu in (4.7 L) V8 was introduced in April 1963, carrying the Challenger name over from the 260 and replacing it as the base V8 for full-sized Fords.

Bore was expanded to 4.00 in (101.6 mm), becoming the standard for most small block Ford engines. Stroke remained at 2.87 inches. Weight was 506 lb (230 kg). It retained the 260's two-barrel carburetor (2V), had a slightly lower 8.7:1 compression ratio, and was rated at 195 hp (145 kW) (SAE gross) at 4,400 rpm and 285 lb⋅ft (386 N⋅m) at 2,200 rpm.

=== D-code ===
In 1964, an intermediate performance version of the engine was introduced with a four-barrel carburetor and 9.0:1 compression, rated at 210 hp (157 kW) at 4,400 rpm and 300 lb⋅ft (407 N⋅m) at 2,800 rpm.

This engine was known as the "D-code", from the letter code used to identify the engine in the VIN, and was an option on the 1965 Ford Mustang.

The D-code engine is relatively rare, as it was only offered as an optional engine in the latter half of the 1964 model year.

=== Cyclone ===
This engine was marketed in the Mercury Comet Cyclone as the "Cyclone" and carried a K-code in its Mercury VIN. A two-barrel version was used in 1964, and a four-barrel in 1965. This is not the same engine as the HiPo K-code engine offered in Ford vehicles.

=== C-code ===
For 1965, the compression ratio of the base two-barrel 289 was raised to 9.3:1, increasing power to 200 hp (149 kW) at 4,400 rpm and torque to 282 lb⋅ft (382 N⋅m) at 2,400 rpm.

In 1968, the output was reduced to 195 hp (145 kW).

=== A-code ===
In 1965, compression for the four-barrel (4V) version was increased to 10.0:1, raising output to 225 hp (168 kW) at 4,800 rpm and 305 lb⋅ft (414 N⋅m) at 3,200 rpm.

The 289-4V was also the engine for the Australian Ford XR Falcon GT, its first Falcon GT.

=== Production numbers ===
Around 3,500,000 289-2V and 289-4V engines were made at Cleveland Engine Plant 1 (CEP1) and 800,000 289-2V at Windsor Engine Plant 1 (WEP1) in 1963–1967.

=== 289 HiPo (K-code) ===
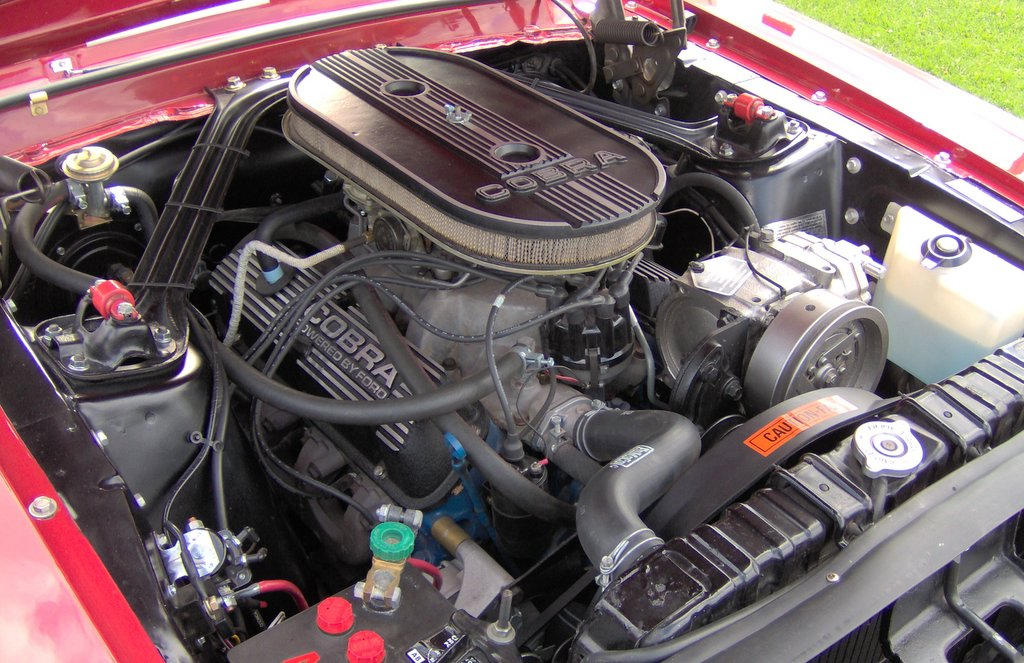
Ford 289 K-code engine in a Shelby GT 350: The horizontal orientation of the thermostat housing on the intake manifold is a telltale Windsor feature.

A high-performance version of the Challenger 289 engine was introduced late in the 1963 model year as a special order for Ford Fairlanes. The engine is informally known as the HiPo or the "K-code", after the engine letter used in the VIN code of cars so equipped. It was the only 289 engine available in the intermediate Fairlanes, with lesser-powered cars receiving the 260 V8. Starting in June 1964, it became an option for the Mustang.

The HiPo engine was engineered to increase performance and high-rpm reliability over the standard 289. It had solid valve lifters with more aggressive cam timing; 10.5:1 compression; a dual point centrifugal advance distributor; smaller combustion chamber heads with cast spring cups and screw-in studs; low-restriction exhaust manifolds; and a bigger, manual-choke 595 CFM carburetor (105 CFM more than the standard 289-4V). The water pump had fewer vanes to minimize high rpm foaming and cavitation, the fuel pump received an extra spring to keep up with high rpm demand, alternator/generator pulleys were larger diameter to slow their relative speeds at high engine revs, and a special fan was fitted.

Bottom-end high-rpm improvements included a flaw-free selected standard block, thicker main bearing caps and crankshaft damper/balancer, larger-diameter rod bolts, a crankshaft made from 80% nodular iron as opposed to the regular item's 40% (with each one checked for correct 'nodularity' by polishing an area of the rear counterweight and comparing a magnification of that surface against a standard), and increased crankshaft counterweighting to compensate for the heavier connecting rod big ends. (The external counter weighting at the front was split between the crankshaft damper and a supplementary counterweight placed adjacent to the front main bearing journal, all designed to reduce the 'bending moment' in the crankshaft at high-rpm.)

The HiPo equipped with a single 4-barrel Autolite 4100 carburetor carried SAE gross ratings of 271 bhp (275 PS; 202 kW) at 6,000 rpm and 312 lb⋅ft (423 N⋅m) at 3,400 rpm.

The K-code HiPo engine was an expensive option, and its popularity was greatly diminished after the 390 and 428 big-block engines became available in the Mustang and Fairlane lines, which offered similar power, lower cost, and cheaper maintenance at the expense of greater weight and a more unbalanced front/rear weight distribution.

==== GT-350 ====
The HiPo engine was used in modified form by Carroll Shelby for the 1965–1967 Shelby GT350, receiving special exhaust headers, an aluminum intake manifold, and a larger 4-barrel Holley 715 CFM carburetor, which raised rated power to 306 bhp (310 PS; 228 kW) at 6,000 rpm and 329 lb⋅ft (446 N⋅m) at 4,200 rpm of torque. Shelby also replaced the internal front press-in oil gallery plugs with threaded plugs to reduce chances of high rpm failure, and installed a larger oil pan with baffles to reduce oil starvation in hard cornering.

From 1966 to 1968, Shelby offered an optional Paxton supercharger on Shelby GT350 289s, raising power to around 390 hp (291 kW).

==== Production numbers ====
About 25,000 K-code 289s were manufactured at Cleveland Engine Plant 1 (CEP1) between March 1963 and June 1967.

== 302 ==
The Ford GT40 MKII had dominated the 24 Hours of Le Mans in 1966, and the GT40 MKIV did likewise in 1967, using various versions of the Ford medium block FE engine. In an attempt to bring top speeds down, the organizers of this race capped engine capacity at 5.0-liters in 1968. With Ford's large-displacement cars obsoleted, Ford Advanced Vehicles was closed in 1966. John Wyer established J. W. Automotive Engineering Ltd and built a car called the Mirage that was based on the small block MkI GT40, but with displacement increased to 302 cu in (4.9 L).

Since Ford required GT40 engines to be derived from production car engines, the 302 was adopted for domestic manufacturing. Both two-bolt and four-bolt main bearing versions were made.

=== 2-Bolt main bearing caps ===
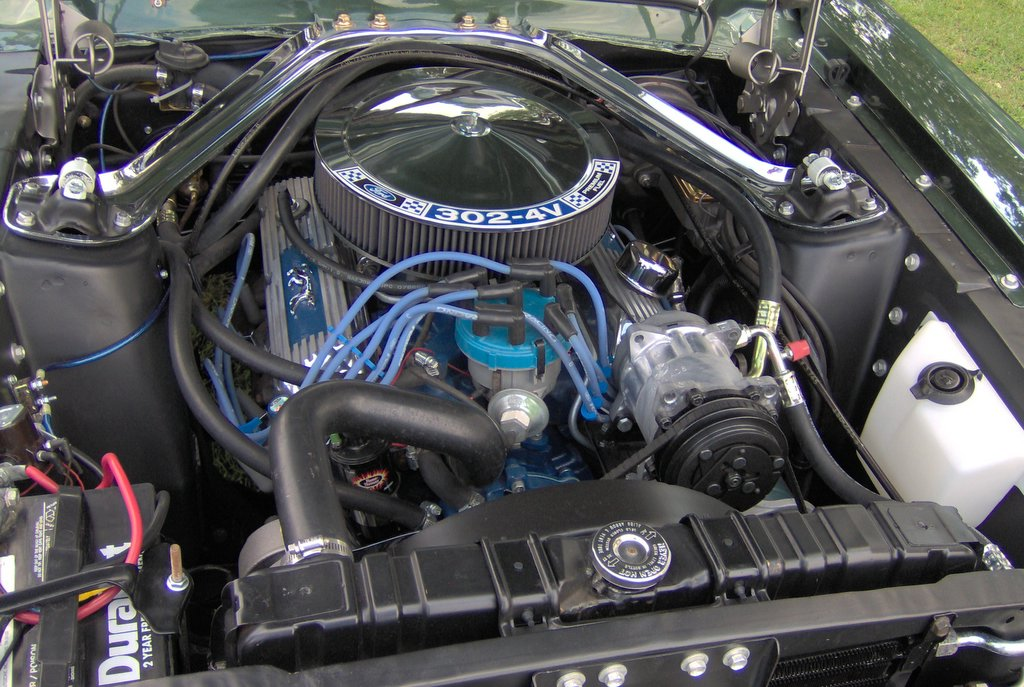
A 302 V8 with a 4-barrel carburetor (designated "4V") in a 1968 Mercury Cougar

In 1968, the small-block's stroke was increased from 2.87 in (72.9 mm) to 3 in (76.2 mm), giving a total displacement of 4,942 cc (4.9 L; 301.6 cu in). The connecting rods were shortened to permit the use of the same pistons as the 289. The new 302 replaced the 289 early in the 1968 model year.

The most common form of this engine used a two-barrel carburetor, initially with 9.5:1 compression. It had hydraulic lifters and valves of 1.773 in (45.0 mm) (intake) and 1.442 in (36.6 mm) (exhaust), and was rated (SAE gross) at 220 hp (164 kW) at 4,600 rpm and 300 lb⋅ft (407 N⋅m) at 2,600 rpm. An optional four-barrel version was rated at 230 hp (172 kW) at 4,800 rpm.

The 302 was primarily manufactured at Ford's Cleveland engine plant in Brook Park, Ohio, just as its predecessors were, though Windsor Engine No. 2 manufactured truck-spec engines from 1982 to 1996. The 302 received several changes over the course of its production run, including longer valve stems with rotating lash caps, bottle neck type rocker studs for a positive stop nut arrangement and a longer pushrod to correct valve train geometry. The water pump borrowed from the 351 Cleveland, with a few minor alterations to the casting, allowed the use of a left hand water inlet, which improved water circulation in the radiator to a more cross-flow direction. This change also necessitated moving the timing marks on the harmonic damper to the other side of the front timing cover, and a change to four bolts holding the crank pulley instead of three.

Emission regulations caused a progressive reduction in compression ratio for the 302 two-barrel, to 9.0:1 in 1972, reducing SAE gross horsepower to 210 hp (157 kW). In that year, U.S. automakers began to quote horsepower in SAE net ratings; the 302 two-barrel carried a net rating of 140 hp (104 kW). By 1975, its power had dropped as low as 122 hp (91 kW) in some models. Until fuel injection began to appear in the 1980s, net power ratings did not rise above 210 hp (157 kW).

From the 1978 model year, the 302 became more commonly known as the 5.0 Liter, although its metric displacement is only 4,942 cc (4.9 L; 301.6 cu in). Despite Ford's branding, Car and Driver referred to the 302 as a 4.9-liter engine. Other terms for it included "5-Oh", "5-Point-Oh", and "5 Liter".

Throttle-body fuel injection became available on the 1980 Lincoln Continental, and became standard on all non-H.O. 5.0 Liter engines for 1983. For the 1986 model year, Ford replaced the throttle-body system with sequential multi-port fuel injection, identifiable by the large intake with an "EFI 5.0" badge on top.

Variants of the engine remained in use in Ford passenger cars and light trucks through the mid-1990s, and in SUVs until 2001.

Applications:
- 1968–1970 Ford Fairlane (Americas)
- 1968–1970 Ford Falcon (North America)
- 1968–1995 Ford Mustang
- 1968–1974 Ford Galaxie
- 1968–1996 Ford Econoline
- 1968–1986 Ford LTD (Americas)
- 1969–1991 Ford Country Squire
- 1969–1974 Ford Torino
- 1969–1996 Ford F-Series
- 1969–1996 Ford Bronco
- 1971–1977 Ford Maverick
- 1972–1979 Ford Ranchero
- 1975–1980 Ford Granada (North America)
- 1977–1981, 1983–1988, 1991–1993 Ford Thunderbird
- 1977–1979 Ford LTD II
- 1978–1979 Ford Fairmont
- 1978–1991 Ford LTD Crown Victoria
- 1996–2001 Ford Explorer
- 1968, 1977–1981, 1983–1988, 1991–1993 Mercury Cougar
- 1968–1969 Mercury Cyclone
- 1968–1976 Mercury Montego
- 1969–1991 Mercury Colony Park
- 1969–1977 Mercury Comet
- 1975–1980 Mercury Monarch
- 1979–1986 Mercury Capri
- 1979–1986 Mercury Marquis
- 1983–1991 Mercury Grand Marquis
- 1997–2001 Mercury Mountaineer
- 1977–1980 Lincoln Versailles
- 1980, 1982–1987 Lincoln Continental
- 1980–1983 Continental Mark VI
- 1984–1985 Continental Mark VII
- 1986–1992 Lincoln Mark VII
- 1981–1990 Lincoln Town Car
- 1989–2003 Laforza

==== GT-350 ====
For 1968 only, there were three versions of the engine. The standard powerplant was a 302-4V with a high-rise manifold (basic intake at first), a Holley four-barrel 600 CFM carburetor and a dual exhaust, producing 250 hp (186 kW) at 4,800 rpm and 310 lb⋅ft (420 N⋅m) at 2,800 rpm. An optional, factory installed, Paxton supercharger was available that increased the GT350's output to 335 hp (250 kW) at 5,200 rpm and 324 lb⋅ft (439 N⋅m) at 3,200 rpm.. A special high-performance Shelby-modified version of the 302 was offered by Ford in the Shelby GT350 as a mid-year replacement during the model-year. Key features included: an angled, high-rise aluminum or iron intake manifold, a larger Holley four-barrel 715 CFM carburetor, and bigger valves of 1.875 in (47.6 mm) intake and 1.6 in (41 mm) exhaust. It had a longer-duration camshaft, still with hydraulic lifters. The heads had special close-tolerance pushrod holes to guide the pushrods without rail rocker arms or stamped steel guide plates. The combustion chambers also featured a smaller quench design for a higher compression ratio and enhanced flow characteristics. Additionally, high-flow cast exhaust manifolds similar to those on the 289 Hi-Po K-code engine further improved output. Heavy-duty connecting rods with high-strength bolts and a nodular iron crankshaft were also included in this package. Rated power (SAE gross) was estimated at 315 hp (235 kW) at 5,000 rpm and 333 lb⋅ft (451 N⋅m) at 3,200 rpm.. The package, which cost $692 including some other equipment, was not popular and did not return for 1969. This engine is documented in the Ford factory engine repair manual for 1968 Mustangs and Fairlanes.

==== 5.0 H.O. ====
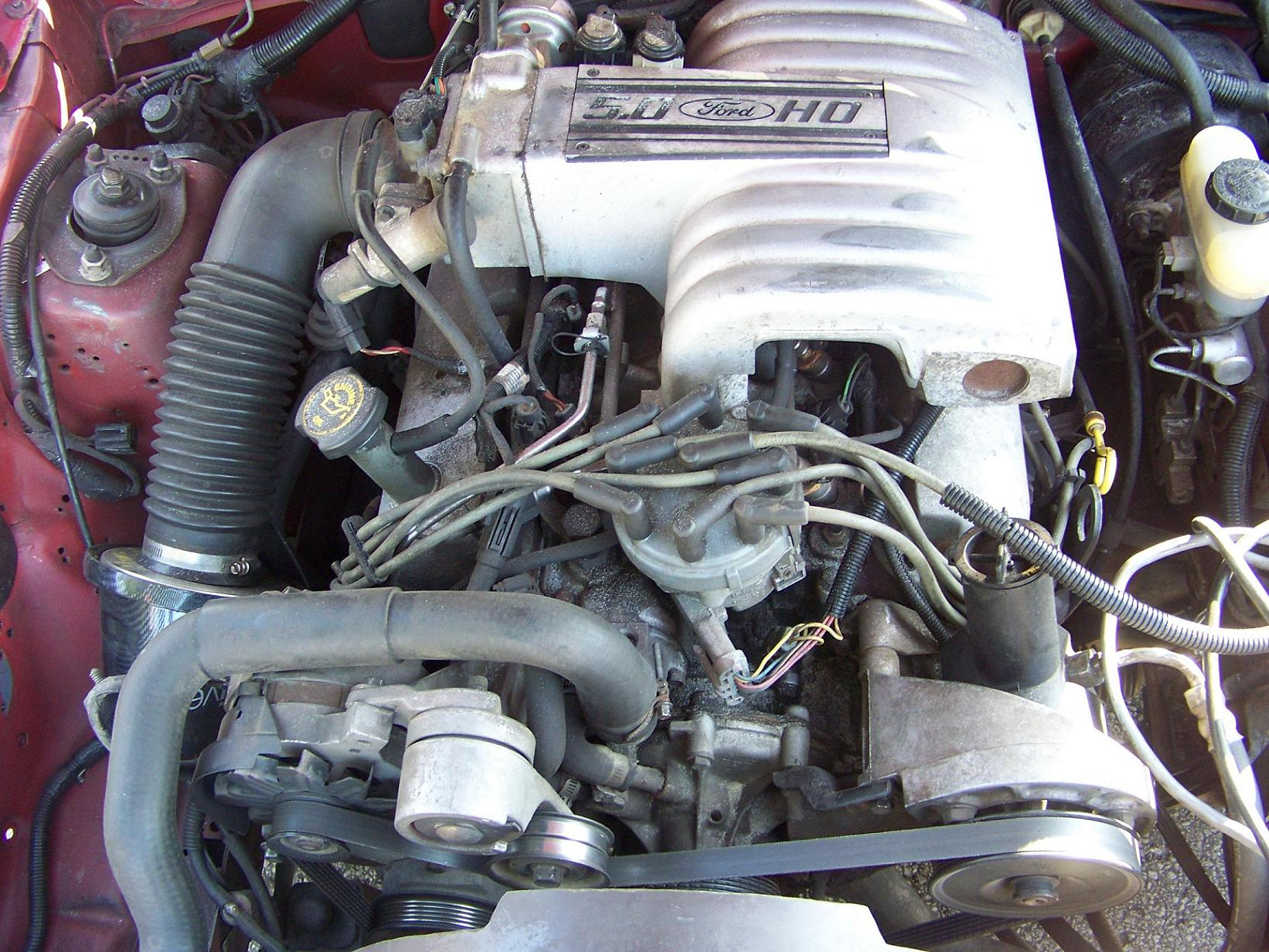
5.0 HO in a Ford Mustang

The 1982 model year brought a new 5.0 High Output variation of the 302. Mustangs and Mercury Capris with manual transmissions were equipped with two-barrel carburetors in 1982, then got a four-barrel Holley carburetor for 1983–85. The block got revised, taller lifter bosses to accept roller lifters, and a steel camshaft in 1985. Electronic sequential fuel injection was introduced in 1986. While sequential injection was used on the Mustang beginning in 1986, other car and truck models continued to use a batch-fire fuel injection system. The speed-density based ECU-controlled electronic fuel-injection (EFI) systems used a large, two-piece, cast-aluminum manifold. It was fitted on all 302 engines through 1988, after which it was phased out for a mass airflow sensor (MAF) system in most applications. Non–California compliant Panther platform cars kept the speed-density system until the Lincoln Town Car got the 4.6 L OHC Modular V8 for model year 1991, and the Crown Victoria and Mercury Grand Marquis for 1992.

The same manifold was used in MAF applications, with the addition of the MAF sensor in the air intake tube. The MAF system continued, with minor revisions, until the retirement of the engine in 2001. Ford offered a performance head that was a stock part on 1993–1995 Mustang Cobra models and pre-1997 ½ Ford Explorers and Mercury Mountaineers equipped with the 5.0 L engine called the GT40 head (casting ID F3ZE-AA). In mid-1997, the Explorer and Mountaineer 5.0 L heads were revised and renamed GT40P. The GT40P heads, unlike the GT40 heads, had a very well-developed port shape which yielded about 200 cfm on the intake side and 140 cfm on the exhaust side without increasing the size of the ports from the standard E7TE castings, and without increasing the exhaust valve size. These highly-efficient heads also had smaller 59–61 cc combustion chambers for added compression, and the combustion chamber shape was revised to put the spark plug tip near the center of the chamber for a more even burn.

Applications:

- 1982–1995 Ford Mustang
- 1982–1986 Mercury Capri
- 1984–1985 Ford LTD LX
- 1984–1985 Ford Sierra XR8 (South Africa)
- 1985 Mercury Marquis LTS
- 1987–1992 Lincoln Mark VII (1987 LSC models only)
- 1991–1993 Ford Thunderbird
- 1991–1993 Mercury Cougar
- 1991–2002 Ford Falcon
- 1991–2002 Ford Fairlane/Ford LTD
- 1996–2001 Ford Explorer
- 1997–2001 Mercury Mountaineer
- 1990–1996 Panoz Roadster

==== 5.6 ====
In 2001, Ford Australia developed a 5.6-litre (5,605 cc; 342.0 cu in) small block by lengthening the stroke from 76.2 mm (3.0 in) to 86.4 mm (3.4 in). The engine featured reworked large-valve GT40P heads, a unique eight-trumpet inlet manifold fitted with a unique throttle body, a long-throw crank, H-beam rods, and roller rockers. It produced 335 hp (250 kW) at 5,250 rpm and 369 lb⋅ft (500 N⋅m) at 4,250 rpm. The engine was used in special 2001–2002 "T" series Ford Falcons and XR8 Pursuit 250s, which were the last models developed in collaboration with Tickford Vehicle Engineering, and which were exclusively available from dealers under the FTE (Ford Tickford Experience) banner.

=== 4-Bolt main bearing caps ===
==== GT40 ====
In response to a new Le Mans regulation limiting engine displacement to 5 L (305 cu in), Ford added an extra 1/8-inch of piston travel to the 289 Hi-Performance V8, yielding the 302 cu in (4,949 cc) block. It featured heavy-duty four-bolt main bearing caps and pressed-in core plugs, and was topped with Gurney-Weslake aluminum heads.About 50 blocks were made.

==== Tunnel-Port 302 ====
The 302 "Tunnel-Port" engine was envisioned as the motor that would bring Ford a third Trans-Am Championship title in 1968.

Starting with a 1967 GT40 block, Ford fitted cylinder heads with a design based on their NASCAR 427 heads. The intake ports were straight, instead of snaking around the push rods, while the push rods went through the center of the ports (thus the name "Tunnel-Port"). This configuration also enabled larger valves to be used. The 302 tunnel-port motor was topped off with an aluminum dual quad intake.

Shelby dynamometer runs showed the engine was capable of producing 440–450 hp (328–336 kW), and of operating in a very high rpm band (8000+).

==== Boss 302 ====
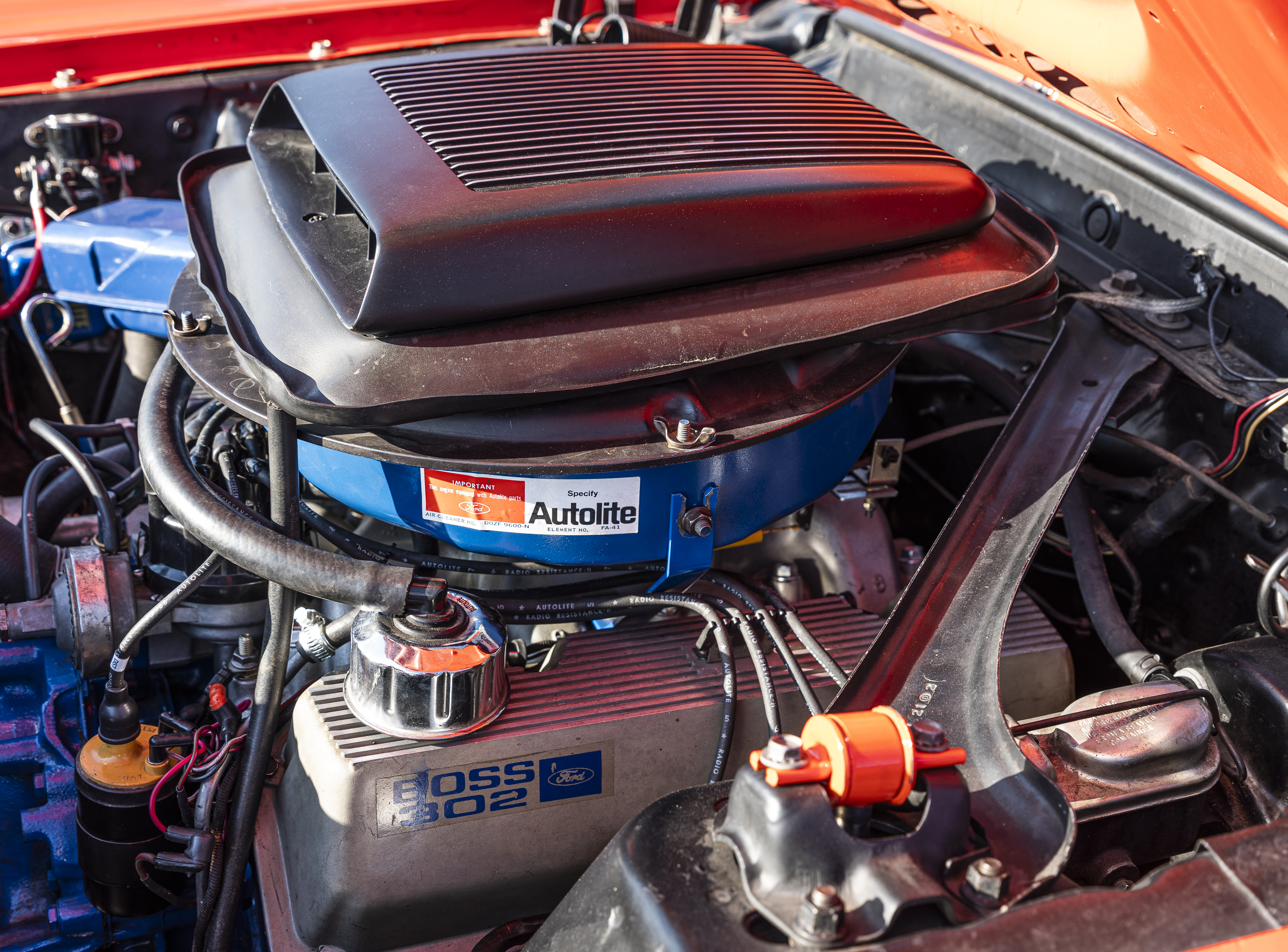
Boss 302 engine

Officially called the "302 H.O.", the Boss 302 was a performance variant of the small block designed to help Ford wrest back the 5-liter Trans-Am racing championship from the Camaro Z/28. Conceived of by chief engineer Bill Gay and realized by Bill Barr, it put large-port, large-valve, quench-chambered, free-flowing cylinder heads adapted from the design destined for the 351 Cleveland, which debuted in 1969, on a special racing block, bringing rated power to 290 hp (216 kW). According to some reports, the canted-valve, deep-breathing, high-revving engine could produce more than 310 hp (231 kW), although it was equipped with an electrical revolution limiter that restricted maximum engine speed to 6,150 rpm. The 302 H.O. borrowed both components and ideas from the 289 HiPo. A strong 4-bolt main bottom end, thicker cylinder walls, steel screw-in core plugs, aggressive forged-steel crank, special HD connecting rods, and Cleveland-style forged pistons were geared to racing. The Boss 302 Mustang was offered only for the 1969 and 1970 model years. In the January 2010 issue of Hot Rod magazine, a Boss 302 engine built to the exact specifications, settings, and conditions of the original engine was tested. It produced 372 hp (277 kW) at 6,800 rpm (650 rpm over the original engine's redline) and 325 lb⋅ft (441 N⋅m) of torque at 4,200 rpm.

== 351W ==
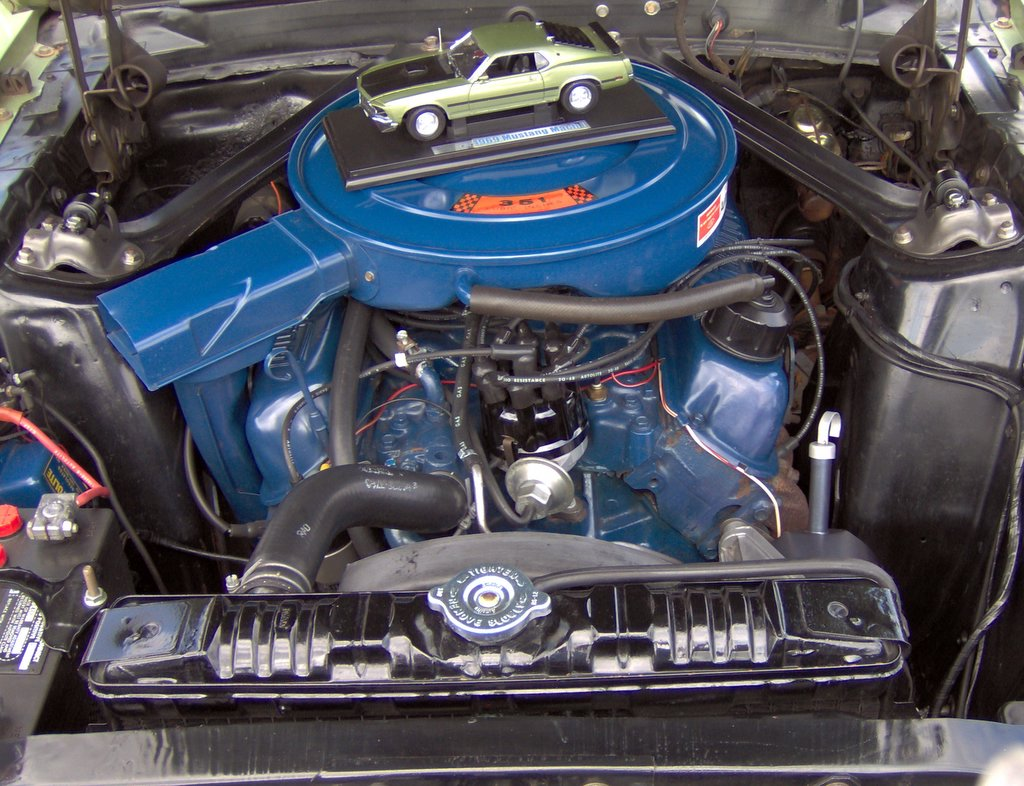
A 351 Windsor V8 in a 1969 Ford Mustang

The 351W (Windsor) made its debut in 1969; it is often confused with the Ford 351 Cleveland, a different engine of nearly identical displacement that also began production in 1969. The 351.9 cu in (5.8 L; 5,766 cc) Windsor featured a 1.3 in (32.5 mm) taller deck height than the 289/302, allowing a stroke of 3.5 in (88.9 mm). It was initially rated (SAE gross) at 250 hp (186 kW) with a two-barrel carburetor (referred to as "2V" in engine designations) or 290 hp (216 kW) with a four-barrel (designated "4V"). Emissions compliance led to a compression drop in 1971. When Ford switched to net power ratings in 1972 power ratings had fallen to 153 hp (114 kW) from 161 hp (120 kW).

The 289, 302, and 351W all share the same bellhousing, motor mounts, and other small parts. The distributor is slightly different, to accommodate a larger oil pump shaft and larger oil pump. Some years had threaded dipstick tubes. The 351W had larger main bearing caps, thicker and longer connecting rods. The firing order was changed to 1-3-7-2-6-5-4-8 from the usual 1-5-4-2-6-3-7-8 to move the "noise" of the consecutively-firing adjacent front cylinders to the sturdier rear part of the engine block while reducing excessive main bearing load. The changes added some 25 lb (11 kg) to the engine's dry weight.

The head castings and valve head sizes from 1969 to 1976 were different, notably in passages for air injection and spark plug diameters (1969–1974 18 mm, 1975 and up 14 mm). From 1977 onward, the 351W shared the same head casting as the 302, differing only in bolt hole diameters (7/16 inch for the 302, 1/2 inch for the 351W). Early blocks (casting ID C9OE-6015-B) had enough metal on bearing saddles 2, 3, and 4 for four-bolt mains, and as with all small-block Fords, were superior in strength to most late-model, lightweight castings. Generally, the 1969 to 1974 blocks are considered to be stronger than the later blocks, making these early units some of the most desirable in the small block or 335-series. During the 1980s, a four-barrel version (intake manifold casting ID E6TE-9425-B) was reintroduced for use in light trucks and vans. In 1988, fuel injection replaced the four-barrel carburetor in truck applications, while Panther platform cars retained the variable venturi carburetor through 1991 when the small block was replaced by the 4.6L Modular in that application. Roller camshaft/lifters were introduced in 1994.

The original connecting rod beam (forging ID C9OE-A) featured drilled oil squirt bosses to lubricate the piston pin and cylinder bore and rectangular-head rod bolts mounted on broached shoulders. A number of fatigue failures were attributed to the machining of the part, so the bolt head area was spot-faced to retain metal in the critical area, requiring the use of 'football head' bolts. In 1975, the beam forging (D6OE-AA) was updated with more metal in the bolt-head area. The oil squirt bosses were drilled for use in export engines, where the quality of accessible lubricants was questionable. The rod cap forging remained the same on both units (part ID C9OE-A). In 1982, the Essex V6 engine used a version of the 351W connecting rod (E2AE-A) machined in metric units, while the V8 part was machined with SAE units. The cap featured a longer boss for balancing than the original design.

In 1971, the block deck height was raised from 9.480 to 9.503 in (240.8 to 241.4 mm) (casting D1AE-6015-DA) to lower the compression ratio to reduce NO_{x} emissions without the need to change piston or cylinder-head design. In 1974, a boss was added on the front of the right cylinder bank to mount the air injection pump (casting D4AE-A). In 1974, the oil dipstick tube moved from the timing case to the skirt under the left cylinder bank near the rear of the casting. In 1984, the rear main seal was changed from a two-piece to a one-piece design.

Around 8.6 million 351W engines were manufactured between 1969 and 1996 at the Windsor Engine Plant Number One.

Applications:

- 1969–1974 Ford Galaxie
- 1969–1970 Ford Mustang
- 1969–1971 Mercury Cougar
- 1969–1991 Ford Country Squire
- 1969–1970 Ford Fairlane (Americas)
- 1970–1976 Ford Torino
- 1974–1976 Ford Elite
- 1975–1976 Bricklin SV-1
- 1975–1996 Ford E series
- 1977–1979 Ford LTD II
- 1977–1979 Ford Thunderbird
- 1979–1996 Ford Bronco
- 1979–1982 Ford LTD (Americas)
- 1979–1991 Ford LTD Crown Victoria (after 1982, this engine would only be sold for police sales in the U.S.)
- 1983–1997 Ford F-Series
- 1977–1979 Mercury Cougar (station wagons only)
- 1978, 1986–1991 Mercury Colony Park
- 1978–1982 Mercury Marquis
- 1986–1991 Mercury Grand Marquis
- 1980 Continental Mark VI
- 1980 Lincoln Continental
- 1995 Ford Mustang SVT Cobra R

== Crate engines ==
In the 2000s, Ford Racing Performance Parts sold two "Boss" crate engines and at least one 351 block. Most Ford racing versions of the 302 and 351 feature a siamesed bore and many of them feature drilled coolant crossover holes.

=== FR Boss 302 ===
An all-new Boss 302 engine was unveiled in the 2006 SEMA show.

=== FR Boss 351W ===
The "Racing Boss 351" (not to be confused with the Ford 335 engine Cleveland-based Boss 351) is a crate engine based on the 351 cu in (5,752 cc) Ford Windsor engine, but with Cleveland-sized 2.75 in (70 mm) main bearing journals. Deck height choices include 9.2 in (234 mm) and 9.5 in (241 mm). The maximum cylinder dimensions are a 4.125 in (105 mm) bore and a 4.25 in (108 mm) stroke. The resulting maximum displacement is 454.38 cu in (7,446 cc).

The uncross-drilled block with increased bore capacity became available from the third quarter of 2009. A 427 cu in (6,997 cc) Boss 351-based crate engine producing 535 hp (399 kW) was available from the first quarter of 2010.

In 2010, the MSRP for the Boss 351 block was US$1,999.

== 427 aluminum block ==
The small-block engine was bored and stroked to 427 cu in (7.0 L) for use in the Saleen S7 (2000–2004) and its competition model S7-R (although it used Cleveland style heads). The road-going engine was capable of producing 550 bhp (410 kW; 558 PS) at 6400 rpm. The S7's top speed was an estimated 220 mph (354 km/h).

In 2005, Saleen released the S7 twin-turbo version of the engine with two Garrett turbochargers producing 5.5 psi (0.38 bar) of boost, increasing the maximum power to 750 bhp (559 kW; 760 PS) at 6300 rpm, and the maximum torque to 700 lb⋅ft (949 N⋅m) at 4800 rpm. The top speed of the twin-turbo S7 was 248 mph (399 km/h).

== Marine engines ==
From 1962 through the 1990s, Ford small blocks engines were marinized by various companies (except for the 255 cu in (4.2 L)).

=== Marine 302 ===
The 302 was marinized and offered in both standard and reverse-rotation setups.

=== Marine 351 ===
From the late 1960s through the early to mid-1990s, the 351 Windsor had a long history of being marinized by Holman Moody Marine, Redline of Lewiston, ID (now defunct), Pleasure Craft Marine (PCM), and Indmar for use in several makes of recreational boat, including; Correct Craft, Ski Supreme, Hydrodyne, MasterCraft, and Supra inboard competition ski boats. The early marinized engines were rated at 220 hp (164 kW). Most PCM and Indmar marinized 351s were rated at 240 hp (179 kW). In the early 1990s, a 260 hp (194 kW) version and a high-output version that used GT40 heads and the Holley 4160 marine carburetor was rated at 285 hp (213 kW). A few 351 GT40/HO engines were marinized equipped with throttle-body fuel injection (TBI) and were rated at 310 hp (231 kW). The marine industry's relationship with the 351W platform ended when Ford was unable or unwilling to compete with GM's production of TBI- and MPI-equipped engines in mass quantity. During that time, the recreational marine community's small-block V8 platform of choice shifted to the 350 cu in (5.7 L) Chevrolet L31 (Vortec 5700) engine series.

== Motorsports ==
The 289 small block powered Shelby Mustangs to the Trans-Am Series manufacturers championship in 1965 and 1966, while the Boss 302 version did the same in 1970. The engine won at the 24 Hours of Le Mans twice; once in 1968 and once in 1969, both times in JWAE Ford GT40s. Other wins came from engines installed in AC Cobras and the Shelby Daytona coupe.

== See also ==
- List of Ford engines
