= Wakeboard boat =

Boat to create wakes for wakeboarding

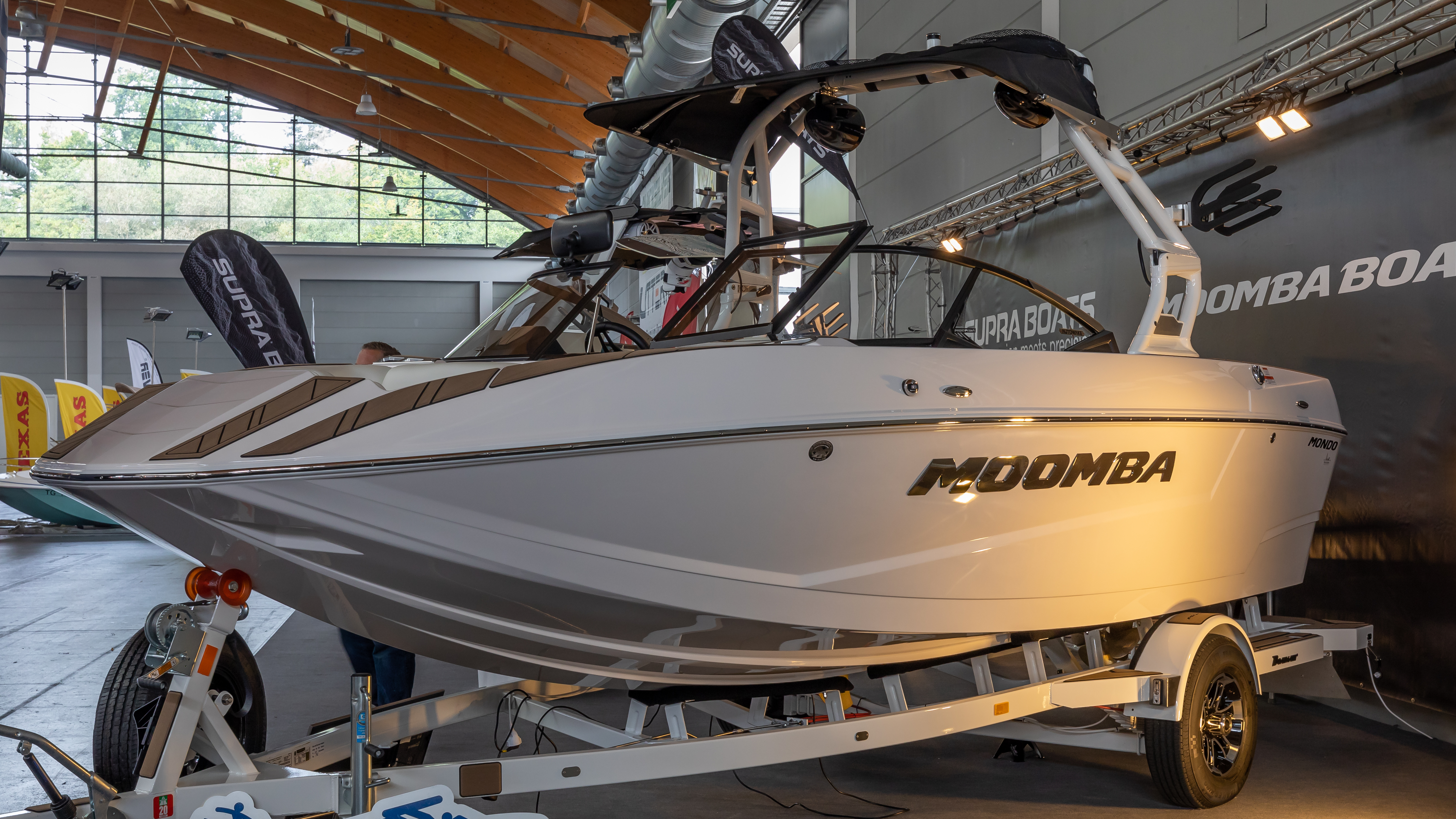
Moomba Mondo wakeboard boat

Wakeboard boats also known as wakeboats, surfboats or tow boats are designed to create a large, specially shaped wake, for a wakeboarder to jump the wakes from side to side doing aerial tricks. They developed from the Runabout type.

== Boat types ==
Generally speaking, wakeboard specific boats are V-drive boats. This means they are an inboard boat with the engine placed backwards in the rear of the boat. This is done to keep more weight in the back of the boat and make the wake larger. Some wakeboard specific boat models are direct drive boats where the engine is in the middle of the boat. Most wakeboard boats will have several features that help to create large wakes. These include ballast, hydrofoil, and hull technology. Ballast is a simple term for weight. When wakeboard boats have ballast tanks, it means that they have room for extra weight to weigh the boat down for larger wakes. For example. If the rider is surfing on the starboard side of the stern. Then you want to activate the starboard ballast in order to give the rider a surf-able wave. All these key features would not be anything if it was not for cruise control which innovated wake boarding. Throttles on v drive boats are extremely sensitive and it is hard to get to the desired speed of the rider. When cruise control is set the driver can push the throttle all the way down and the boat will not go any faster than the desired speed. It locks the engine in at that rpm.

=== Wedges and plates ===
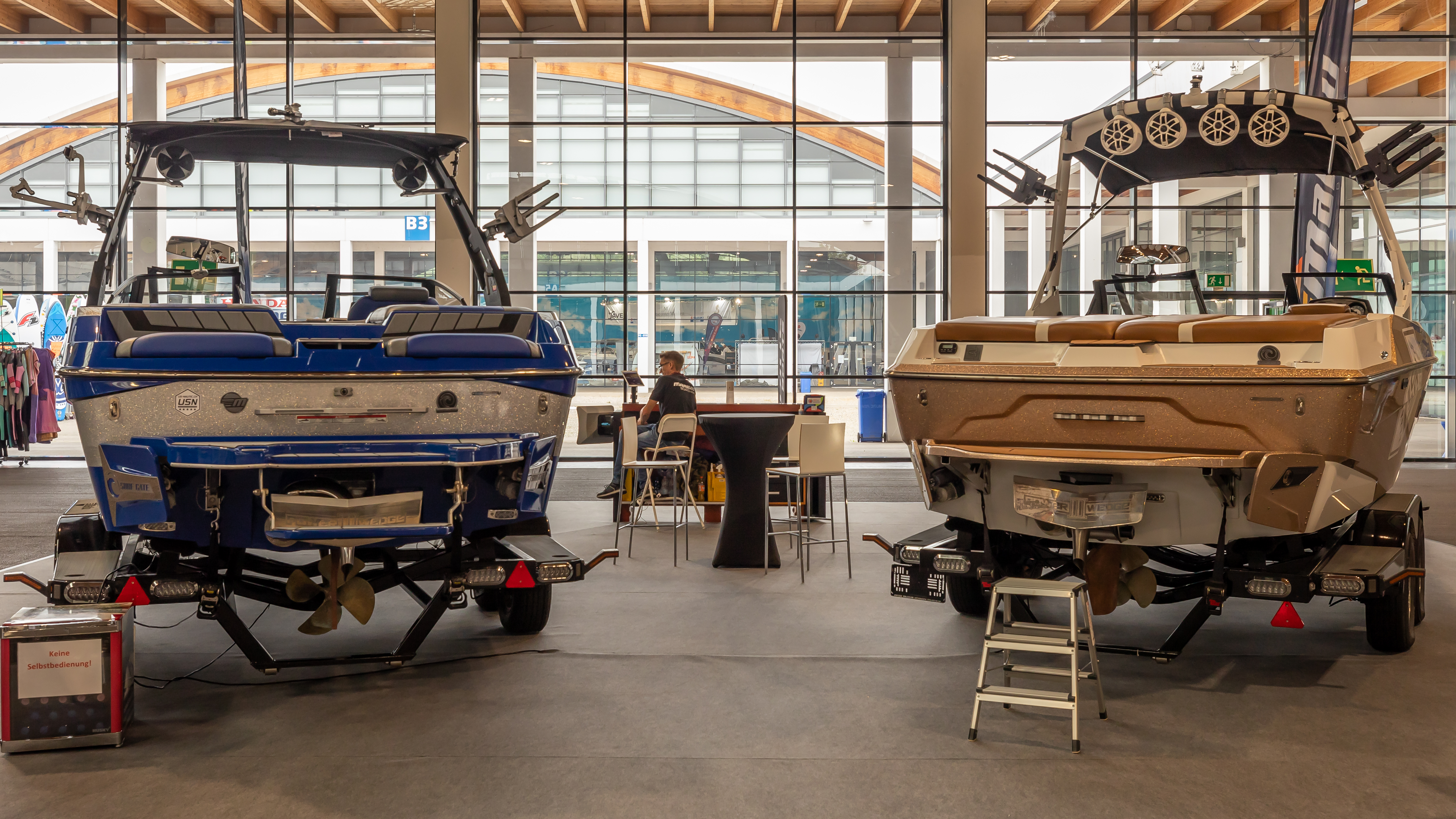
Two wakeboard boats with wedges visible

Many watersports boat manufacturers have developed systems to further enhance the shape of the wakes their boats create. These devices often help to lower the stern of the boat, which creates a larger wake and are very useful when wakesurfing as well. However, the quality and size of the wake is largely a function of the hull design and ballast weight of the boat. Malibu Boats' "Wedge" is a hydrofoil device that can be extended or retracted. When the "Wedge" is extended it creates downward force that pulls the stern of the boat lower in the water. MasterCraft boats use an "attitude adjustment plate" which is a large trim tab that allows the boat to be trimmed- enhancing the wake. Nautique developed the "Hydrogate" which uses Bernoulli's Principle to trim their wakeboarding boats. It works by creating a small channel along the stern of the boat at the transom- when it is closed, the nose of the boat is lower when on a plane creating a wake better for skiing. When the trough opens, approximately 1/2 inches deep, the higher velocity of the water through the trough creates a region of lower pressure, and causes the transom to settle lower, for wakeboarding. The hull is specifically molded to displace monumental amounts of water. Skiers Choice, manufacturer of Supra and Moomba, has created a wake plate that aids the boat in planing by allowing the driver to adjust the device (basically a trim tab). All manufactures have some type of ballast system in addition to the other devices.

=== Hull technology ===
Hull technology is the innovation and R&D that the manufacturers put into their boats to ensure the best stock wake possible. Many boarders use aftermarket ballast and lead to further weigh down their boats for very large wakes or for sports such as wake surfing. Most wakeboat manufacturers have installed factory ballast but sometimes more weight is needed. Ballast can take the form of hard tanks or soft bags which are filled with water from the body of water the boat is being operated on. Wakeboard boats have a certain type of hull to allow for bigger wakes. The bigger the wake the more the stern is sitting in the water. These boats are not good for shallow waters considering their draft is roughly over 3 feet. There is a rudder propeller and shaft drive along with three fins directly under the boat.

Modern wakeboard boats incorporate advanced technologies including automated wake-shaping systems, GPS-controlled cruise control, and integrated telematics for remote monitoring and diagnostics. Electric and hybrid propulsion systems are increasingly available to meet environmental regulations and consumer demand for sustainable alternatives.

=== Wakeboard tower ===
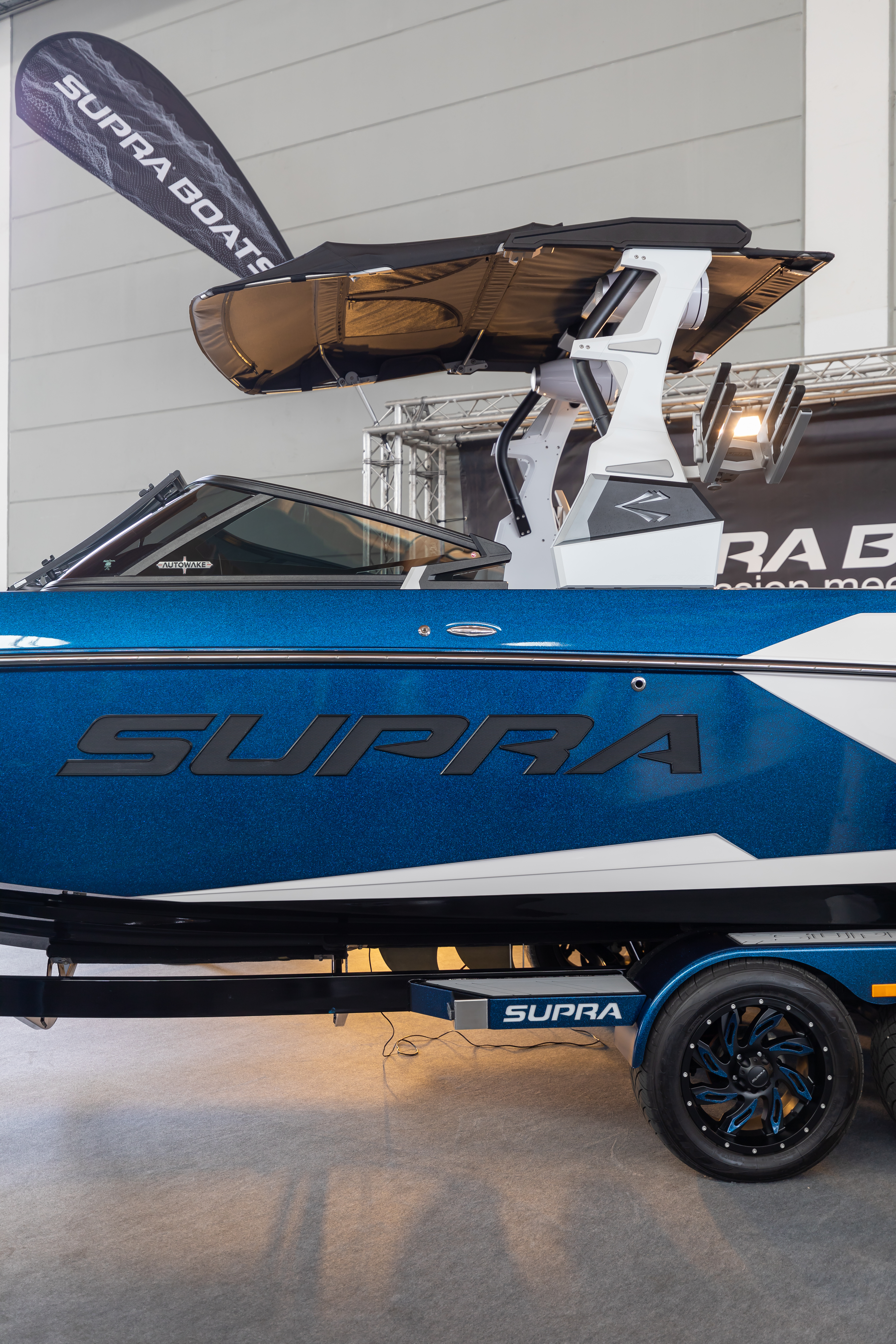
Wakeboard tower with bimini top, rearward facing loudspeakers and wakeboard holder

A wakeboard tower is usually a common characteristic of a wakeboard boat. The tower elevates the pulling position of the rope allowing the rider to launch and stay in the air longer reducing the pull downwards.

== Safety and regulations ==
Wake boats must comply with U.S. Coast Guard safety requirements, including carrying Coast Guard-approved personal flotation devices (PFDs) for each person aboard, visual distress signals, sound-producing devices, and fire extinguishers. As of January 2025, new PFD classifications require Level 50 devices for wakeboarding activities in calm waters.

Recent safety concerns have led to enhanced regulations. The Coast Guard issued Safety Alert 06-25 in April 2025, warning about bow seating risks when encountering large wakes, emphasizing proper weight distribution and passenger positioning.

== Environmental impact ==
Wake boats create significantly larger wakes than traditional boats, leading to increased shoreline erosion and aquatic habitat disruption. Studies show wake boats operated in surf mode produce much greater wave energy and propeller downwash, affecting lake ecosystems and nearshore environments.

Many jurisdictions have implemented restrictions on wake boat activities. Canada's Vessel Operation Restriction Regulations, amended in December 2023, created specific wake surfing prohibitions separate from general towing restrictions, allowing local authorities to target issues generated by wake surfing without broader restrictions. Multiple U.S. states require wake boats to operate in waters at least 20 feet deep and 600 feet from shore to minimize environmental impact.

== Popular brands ==
- Centurion
- Malibu
- MasterCraft
- Nautique
- Pavati
- Supra
- Tigé
- Axis Wake (Sub-brand of Malibu)
- Moomba (Sub-brand of Skiers Choice)
- ATX (Entry-level segment)
- Heyday (Brunswick Corporation)

These manufacturers collectively control over 80% of the North American wakeboard boat market, with Malibu, MasterCraft, and Nautique being the premium segment leaders."

== Market ==
The global wakeboard boat market was valued at approximately USD 2.8 billion in 2023 and is projected to reach USD 4.8 billion by 2032, growing at a compound annual growth rate (CAGR) of 5.8%. North America holds the largest market share, with the United States accounting for the majority due to favorable water sports infrastructure and high disposable income levels.

Market growth is driven by increasing interest in water sports, technological innovations, and rising disposable incomes globally. The Asia-Pacific region is experiencing the fastest growth rate due to expanding middle-class populations and water sports tourism development.
