= Mastercraft =

The name Mastercraft may refer to any of the following:

- MasterCraft, brand and manufacturer of recreational boats
- Mastercraft (tool brand), line of tools sold by Canadian Tire
- MasterCraft, brand of home improvement products sold by Menards stores in the United States
- Mastercraft, Australian brand and manufacturer of chocolates, later absorbed by Nestlé
- MSTRKRFT, electronic music group
- Mastercraft Homes, a Phoenix, Arizona-based home builder acquired by Lennar in 1973
