= Hydrodyne =

Hydrodyne was a boat company founded by Abner Crosby in the late 1950s. The company was then later run by his son Abner (Ab) Crosby Jr. until 1993 when he sold his interest in the company to private investors. The Hydrodyne trademark is owned by another ski boat manufacturer and may one day reappear on boats. At the current time, the use of the name for marine applications is non-existent.

Hydrodyne produced many different hulls, ranging from small runabouts all the way up to house boats. Hydrodyne is mostly remembered for its signature waterskiing boats produced in both twin outboards and inboard/outboard configurations that were the preferred waterskiing boats (along with Ski Nautique and MasterCraft) used in most waterski tournaments and shows throughout the 1960s through the 1990s. A few manufacturers, specifically Tom Miller Boats and Dyna-Ski boat company, still make the 18 foot and 20 foot models that can accept up to 3 outboard motors.
