= Jake Caster =

American professional wake surfer

- Occupation: Professional Wake surfer
- Known for: 2017 World Champion in Men’s Pro Skim Division 2018 World Wake Surf Championships Runner-up (2nd) (pro men's skim division) 2019 World Wake Surf Championships Place 3rd (pro men's surf division) 2019 Nautique Masters Wakesurf Championship Runner-up (2nd) (men's professional division)
- Website: jakecaster.com

Jake Caster is an American professional wake surfer and was the 2017 world champion in Men's Pro Skim Division.

== Career ==
Jake Caster attended Westford Academy for high school in Westford, Massachusetts. In 2016 Caster placed first in the Outlaw Skim division of the USA National Championships in Pine Mountain, Georgia. He then became world champion in the Outlaw Skim division at the World Wake Surfing Championships in 2016 held in Fort Lauderdale, Florida. He also placed third in the Surf division. Following the competition, his semi-pro category world ranking rose from twentieth to first, and he moved to the professional category the following season. During the season he also placed second in world's first pro indoor wake surfing competition.

In 2017, Caster won the Centurion World Wake Surfing Championship held in Kelowna, British Columbia, becoming the world champion in Men's Pro Skim Division. During the season he also started his online wake surfing company Live-Wicked.com. In 2018 season, Caster placed third in points on the pro wake surfing category of the 2018 Supra Boats Pro Wakeboard Tour. He also placed 2nd at the 2018 World Wake Surfing Championship in men's pro skim division.
