= Cobalt Boats =

American manufacturer of motorboats

Cobalt Boats, LLC
- Company type: Subsidiary
- Industry: Boat building
- Founded: 1968
- Headquarters: Neodesha, Kansas, United States
- Products: Motorboats
- Parent: Malibu Boats
- Website: www.cobaltboats.com

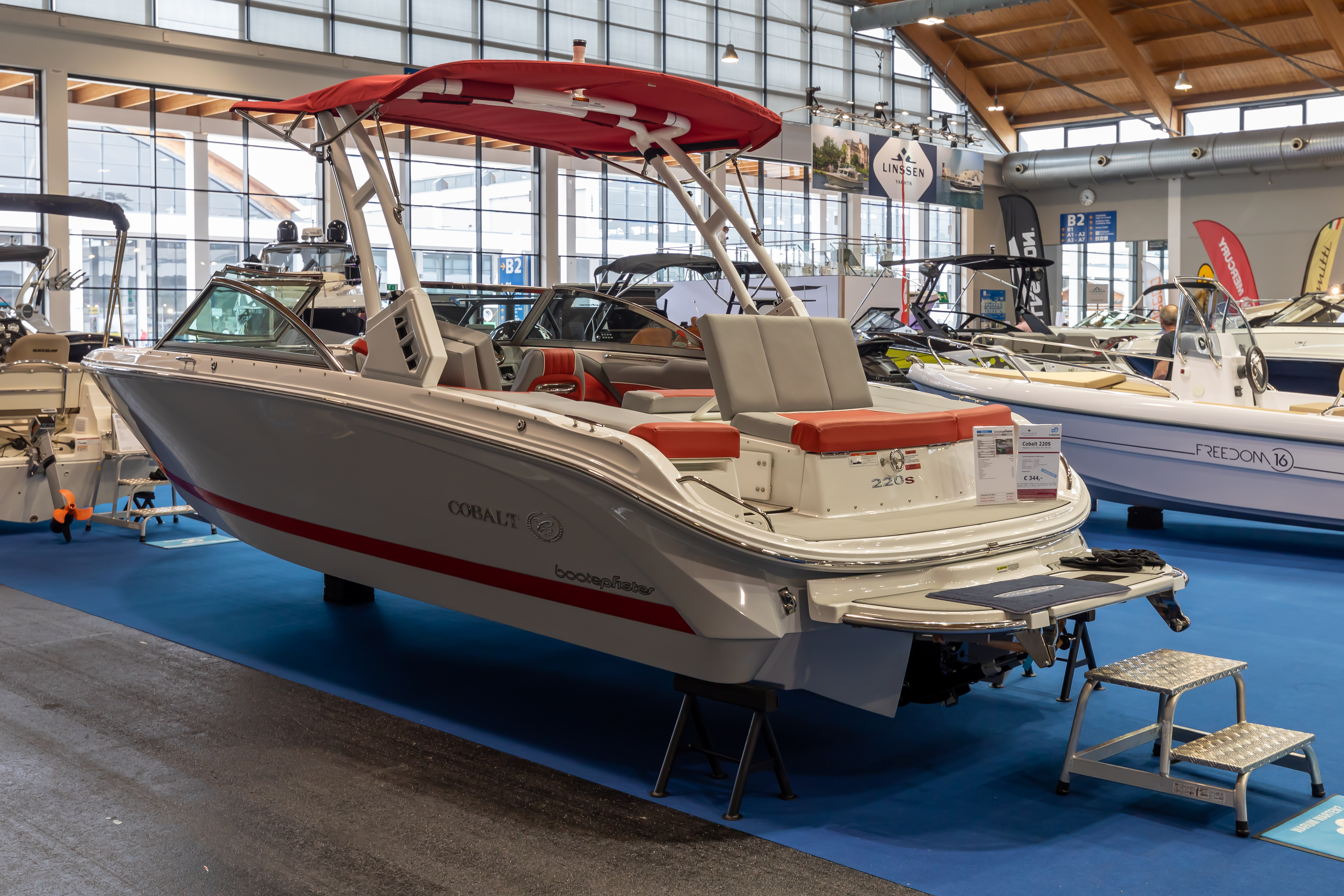
Cobalt 220 S

Cobalt Boats is an American manufacturer of recreational motorboats. It was founded in 1968 and operated independently until its acquisition by Malibu Boats in 2017.

== Company profile ==
Founded in 1968 by Pack St. Clair in Neodesha, Kansas, Cobalt Boats manufactured "high-end speedboats", specifically "small cruisers and runabouts", and "mid- to large-sized sterndrive boats", thereafter expanding "into the surf and outboard markets", and larger family cruisers. Cobalt "began the development of its reputation for quality making stylish tri-hulls in The Seventies", and continued to grow in the 1970s and 1980s. Boats built by Cobalt range from nineteen to forty feet and have Mercury or Volvo sterndrives. The company "placed a premium on meticulous construction and technical excellence in its designs", and "built their reputation on quality instead of price". with buyer-satisfaction surveys frequently ranking boats made by Cobalt "at the top of the list in all major categories". Cobalt used a variety of techniques and materials, including hulls re-enforced with Kevlar and fiberglass stringers. A variety of options are available for leather and wood trim, and engine packages available from Mercury Marine and Volvo Penta. It maintained in-house design and tooling. The number of engines and outdrives available for each model has been described as extensive for the powerboat market. As of 2017, Cobalt was producing over 2,000 boats per year in its Neodesha facility, and for the 12 month period ending March 31, 2017, Cobalt "generated approximately $140 million in net sales" selling 24 boat models "through a dealer network of 132 locations in the United States, Canada, and overseas".

=== Intellectual property ===
Cobalt has a portfolio of intellectual property in its field, having won a patent infringement lawsuit against Brunswick Corporation, parent company of Sea Ray Boats, over a popular "'retractable swim step', a partially submerged platform off the rear of the boat that allows boat passengers to easily enter and exit the water". The infringed patent was upheld in inter partes review, including claims reciting the "spring-biased locking mechanism" key to operation of the Cobalt swim step, and the infringement judgment was upheld in the United States Court of Appeals for the Federal Circuit in September 2017.

=== Acquisition by Malibu Boats ===
In July 2017, competitor Malibu Boats acquired Cobalt Boats in a deal "valued at $130 million", with Malibu maintaining Cobalt's manufacturing operations in Neodesha, Kansas, and adding Cobalt CEO Paxson St. Clair to its board of directors. Malibu had been seeking an acquisition of this type for three to four years before the purchase. Malibu indicated that it would continue the Cobalt brand and maintain a substantial presence in Neodesha.
