= Ashley Kidd =

American wakesurfer

Personal information
- Born: November 15, 1994 (age 30); Corpus Christi, Texas
- Website: www.ashleykidd.com

Sport
- Sport: Wakesurfer

Achievements and titles
- World finals: 2010 World Wake Surf Championship – 2nd in Amateur Women's Group; 2014 & 2015 & 2016 World Wake Surf Championship – 1st in Women's Professional Group
- Updated on 25 July 2016

Ashley Kidd (born November 15, 1994) is a professional wakesurfer and three-time world champion.

Kidd was raised in Corpus Christi, Texas and took up the sport in 2009 on the encouragement of her older brother. In 2010, she won 2nd place in the World Wake Surf Championship where she was entered in the amateur women's group and that same year began competing as a professional. She went on to win the first place in the 2014, 2015 and 2016 World Wake Surf Championships in the women's professional group. As of July 2016 she was ranked Number 1 in the women's professional division of the Competitive Wake Surf Association world rankings.
