= Pavati =

American boat manufacturer

- Company type: Private Company
- Industry: Marine industry
- Founded: 2003
- Headquarters: White City, Oregon, U.S.
- Key people: Chuck Gros
- Products: Wakeboard boat Fishing Boats
- Website: Wake: pavati.com Fishing: pavatimarine.com

Pavati is a boat manufacturer headquartered in White City, Oregon. They specialize in building all aluminum drift boats, power boats, jetboats, and as of 2013, Pavati wake boats. The company was founded in 2003 and created fishing boats designed for salmon.

== Pavati Wake Boats ==
In 2013 Paviti introduced its first wakeboard boat. This boat was the first of its kind to be made with 100% aluminum, as opposed to traditional fiberglass. Pavati boats are some of the most expensive on the wake boat marketplace, with pricing well above $300,000.

=== Models ===
Model	Length (ft)	Dry Weight (lbs)	Factory Ballast (lbs)	Total Weight with Ballast, without Fuel or Passengers (lbs)	Horse Power (HP)	Passengers	Notes
Pavati AL24	24	4894	4888	9782	575	17	
Pavati AL26	26	6700	5988	12,688	575		

== Drift Boats ==
=== Models ===
Model	Length (ft)	Hull Weight (lbs)	Notes
Guardian	16	180	
Warrior	16	180	
Legacy	16	180	
Helium	16.5		
