= Malibu Boats =

American manufacturer of recreational boats

Malibu Boats, Inc.
- Type: Public
- Traded as: Nasdaq: MBUU (Class A); Russell 2000 Component
- Industry: Boat building
- Founded: 1982
- Headquarters: Loudon, Tennessee, USA
- Key people: Steve Menneto, CEO
- Products: Motorboats
- Revenue: ▲US$915 million (2026)
- Net income: ▼US$1.65 million (2026)
- Number of employees: 586 (2017)
- Website: www.malibuboats.com

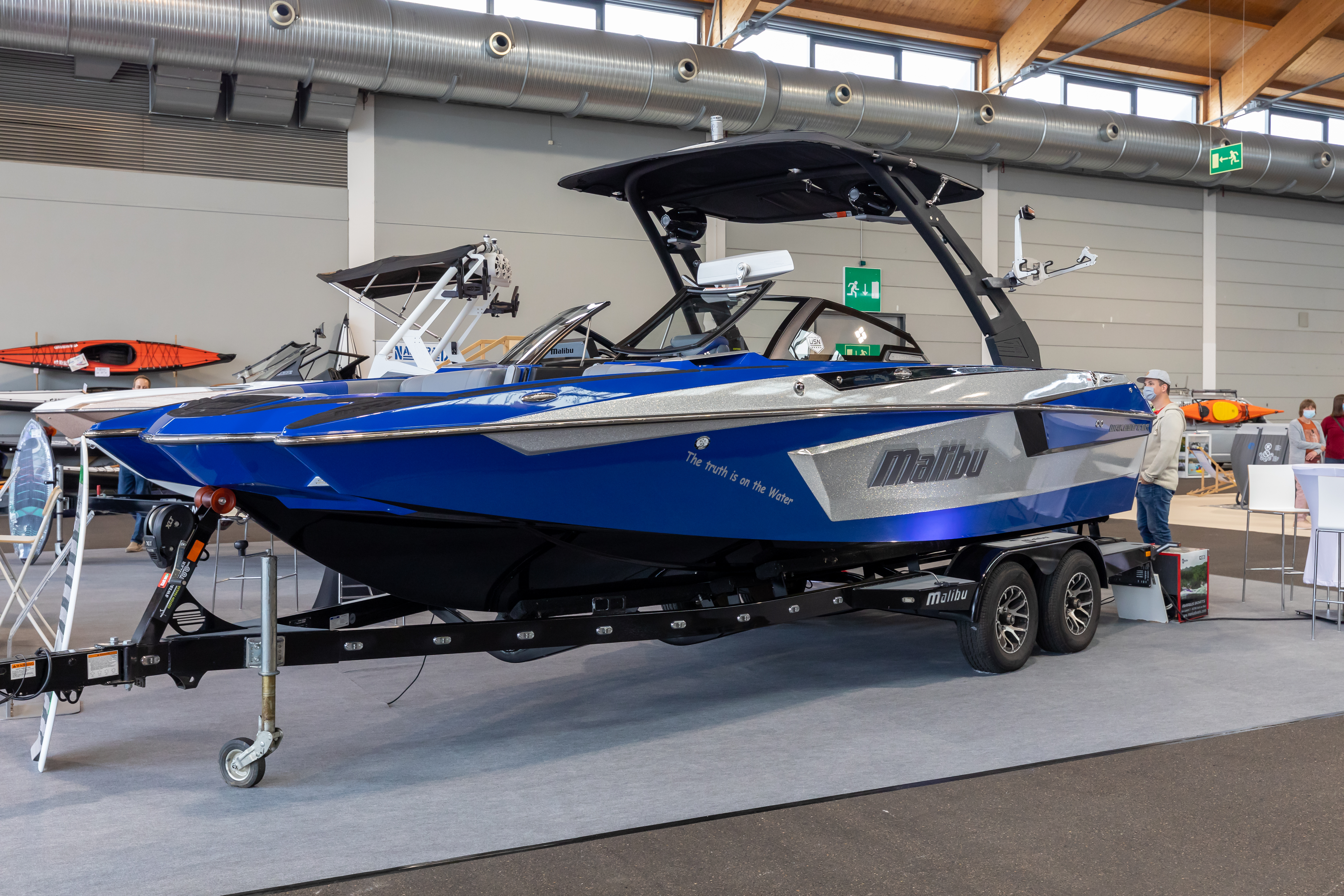
Malibu wakeboard boat

Malibu Boats is an American manufacturer of recreational boats, founded in Merced, California in 1982, and currently headquartered in Loudon, Tennessee with additional production facilities in New South Wales, Australia. Malibu is "the world's largest manufacturer of watersports towboats", used both recreationally and in water skiing and wakeboarding events.

== History ==
Malibu was founded in Merced, California, in 1982 by Bob Alkema and Steve Marshall. During the first year of operation, "production began at a modest pace of two boats per week", using a single-hull design and a blended gel coat. The company quickly developed a backlog, and increased staff and output. The company implemented an employee stock ownership program in 1986, and had acquired a nine percent share of the market by 1988. With the California plant at full production, the company opened a second plant in Tennessee. By the end of the year, Malibu had built almost 1,000 custom ski boats and had been awarded their first Product Excellence Award for Value by Powerboat Magazine. By 1989, it had become "one of the largest boat manufacturers in California", manufacturing 1200 boats per year. That same year, Australian company Flightcraft sold its boat designs to Malibu, and Flightcraft's founder, David Telling, joined Malibu as director of sales and marketing, remaining with Malibu until he left to pursue other endeavors in 1991.

By the end of 1992, Malibu had built a new production facility in Loudon, Tennessee to accommodate the increased demand east of the Mississippi. They removed all wood from the construction, and introduced the new, patented, Fiberglass Engine Chassis System (FibECS), which eliminated vibration and noise associated with the drivetrain. In 1994, Malibu began building boats in Australia through local licensee Malibu Boats Australia, in Albury, New South Wales. In Australia, Malibu had to take legal action to establish control of the "Malibu Boats" name, ultimately prevailing in Malibu Boats West Inc. v. Catanese, with the Federal Court of Australia concluding that Malibu's advertising and marketing in Australia through American magazines was sufficient to establish ownership of the mark there.

Malibu "was early to recognize the importance of wake boarding as an outgrowth of the traditional sport of water skiing", and therefore became positioned to capitalize on this market. By 2002, Malibu was "arguably the largest custom ski boat manufacturer in the world". In 2006, Black Canyon Capital, as the primary investor, acquired Malibu Boats. Malibu's market share grew during the Great Recession of the mid-2000s, as most companies in the industry were contracting.

In 2009, Jack Springer became CEO of Malibu. Under Springer's direction, Malibu established the Axis Wake Research brand, and relocated the executive headquarters to the production facility in Loudon, Tennessee, due to the proximity of that location to the larger freshwater marine manufacturing industry. Malibu later "decided to concentrate its boat manufacturing to Loudon", also moving its customer service, finance, procurement and human resources operations there. As of 2012, Malibu had 325 employees in Loudon, had received 19 "Boat of the Year" awards and 31 "Product Excellence" awards, and accounted for 30 percent of the worldwide towboat market.

A new entity, Malibu Boats Inc., was formed on November 1, 2013, as the holding company for Malibu's operations. The company then had an IPO on the New York Stock Exchange in January 2014. It "began trading on the NASDAQ at a price of $14 a share", yielding "an initial market capitalization of more than $300 million". In mid-2014, Malibu acquired "all of the equity interests of the Malibu Boats licensee in Australia", while assuring regional interests that boats would continue to be manufactured in Australia, with the possibility that the Australian production facility could become Malibu's producer for the entire Asian market. As of 2017, Malibu had "grown to over 500 employees in Tennessee and nearly 600 worldwide". In July 2017, Malibu acquired competitor Cobalt Boats in a deal "valued at $130 million", with Malibu maintaining Cobalt's manufacturing operations in Neodesha, Kansas, and adding Cobalt CEO Paxson St. Clair to its board of directors. In September 2017, Malibu CEO Jack Springer was named the Boating Industry Mover & Shaker of the Year.

In 2018 Malibu Boats acquired Pursuit Boats from S2 Yachts. Pursuit offers of 15 models of offshore, dual console and center console boats. The saltwater outboard fishing market is one of the largest and fastest growing segments in the marine industry.

On July 18, 2024, Steven D. Menneto was appointed as the company's Chief Executive Officer, effective August 5, 2024.

== Brands ==
Malibu has maintained two major brands in the industry, Malibu Boats and Axis Wake, and in 2017, acquired the Cobalt Boats brand.

=== Malibu Boats ===
The company's original brand, Malibu Boats, remains the company's premium brand. In the early 1990s, Malibu adopted the practice of offering to fly purchasers of certain high-end custom boats to their factory headquarters, then located in Merced, "for a red carpet factory tour where they can see the special edition being built right before their eyes". Malibu still produces 12 models at their Loudon, TN plant and offer factory tours by appointment. Several lines of boats are sold under the Malibu brand, including the "Response", "Wakesetter", and ultra-premium "M" series.

=== Axis Wake ===
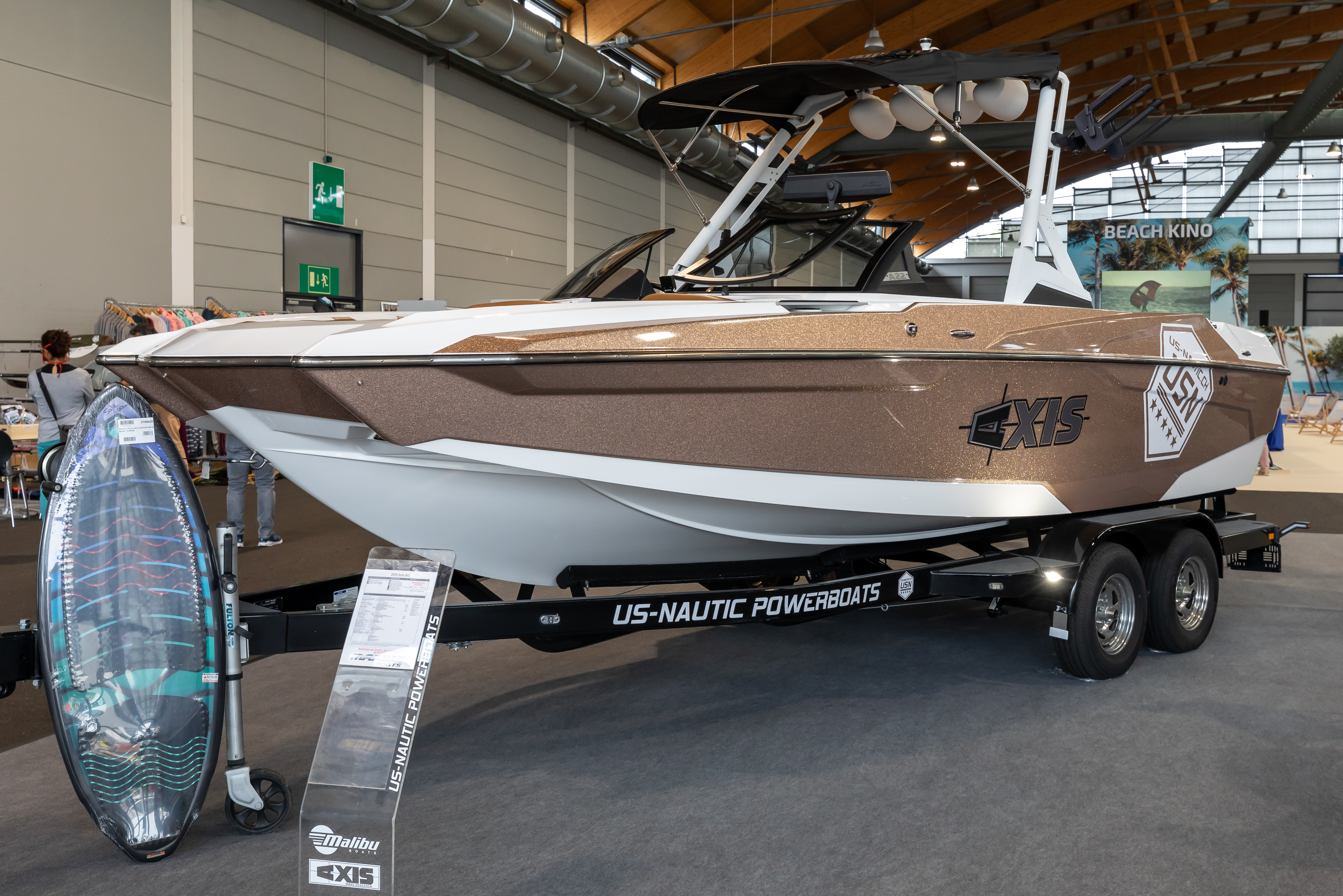
Axis A22

Malibu introduced the Axis Wake brand in 2009 as an "entry-level brand" that "doesn't have all of the electronics and bells and whistles that a Malibu does", such as having a manual wedge as compared to the electronically controlled wedge of Malibu models. As of 2019, Malibu is marketing five models under the Axis Wake brand, the A20, A22, A24, T22, and T23, with the T23 selling between $65,000 and $100,000. The Axis line has developed to changing consumer taste by incorporating highly sought after options such as Malibu's Surf Gate and Power Wedge III

=== Cobalt Boats ===
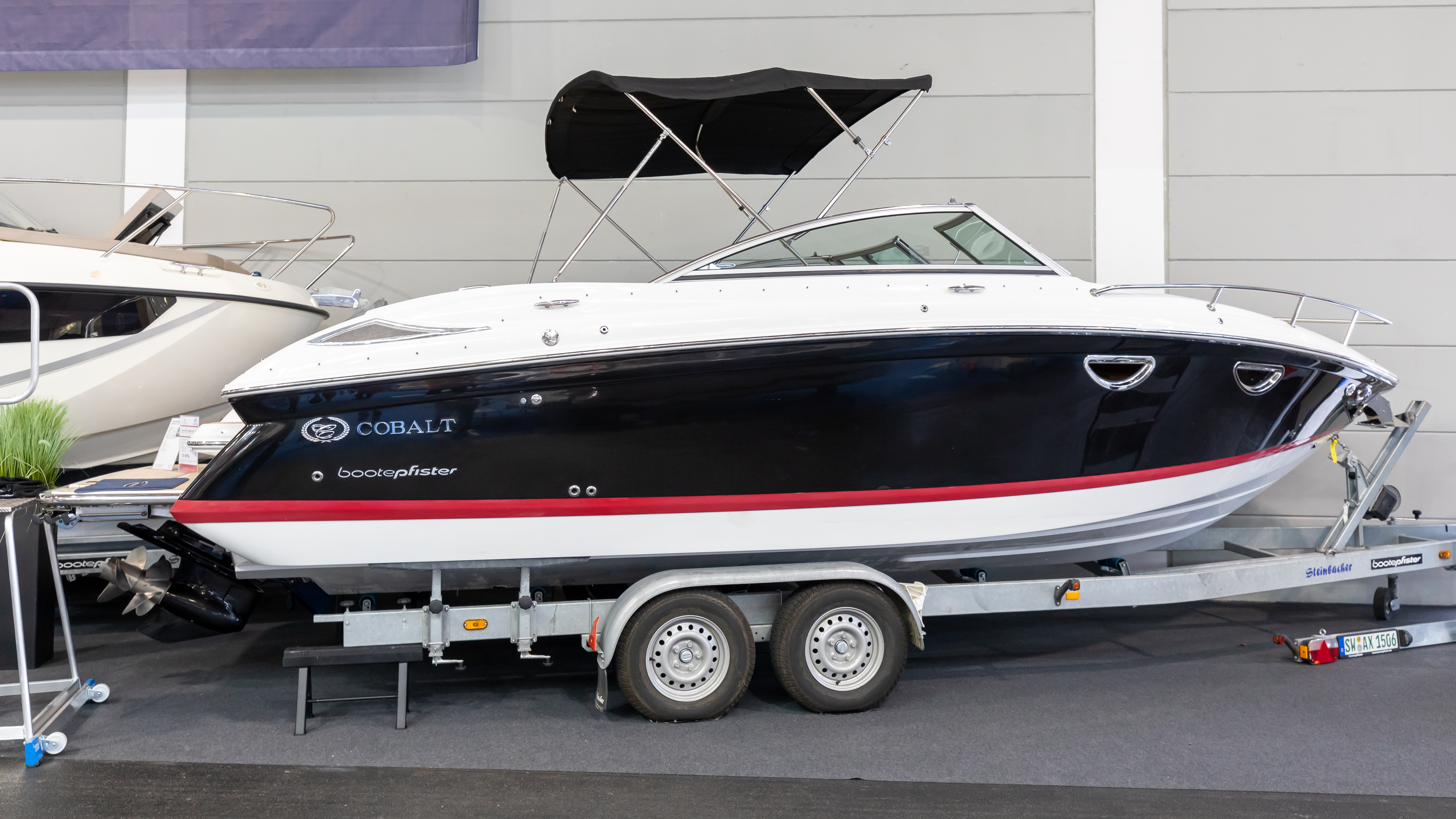
Cobalt 243 Cuddy

Founded in Neodesha, Kansas in 1968, Cobalt Boats manufactured "high-end speedboats", specifically "mid- to large-sized sterndrive boats, and recently expanded into the surf and outboard markets". Cobalt Boats has its own portfolio of intellectual property, having won a patent infringement lawsuit against Brunswick Corporation, parent company of Sea Ray Boats, over a popular "'retractable swim step', a partially submerged platform off the rear of the boat that allows boat passengers to easily enter and exit the water". The infringed patent was upheld in inter partes review, including claims reciting the "spring-biased locking mechanism" key to operation of the Cobalt swim step, and the infringement judgment was upheld in Federal Circuit Court in September 2017. For the 12 month period ending March 31, 2017, "Cobalt generated approximately $140 million in net sales" selling 24 boat models "through a dealer network of 132 locations in the United States, Canada, and overseas". In 2017, Malibu acquired Cobalt Boats for $130 million, and indicated that it would continue the Cobalt brand and maintain a substantial presence in Neodosha.

=== Pursuit Boats ===
Pursuit Boats, acquired by Malibu Boats from Tiara Yachts in 2018, are manufactured in a 250,000 square foot facility in Fort Pierce, Florida.

== Technology ==
Malibu developed and patented a hydraulically operated system "that enables wakesurfers to customize waves on either side of the boat", using "flat planes that unfold from either side of the stern of the boat to create the wake". The technology was introduced to the market in 2012 and marketed as "Surf Gate" technology.

In 2015, Malibu sued luxury high-performance boat maker MasterCraft for patent infringement with respect to Malibu's technology. In May 2017, the parties settled, with MasterCraft denying liability but agreeing to "enter into a license agreement for the payment of future royalties for boats sold by MasterCraft using the licensed technology". In August 2016, Malibu entered into a licensing agreement providing this technology to pleasure and fishing boat manufacturer Chaparral Boats.

== Athletes and athletic events ==
As a producer of boats used for watersports, Malibu "dedicates many resources to the sports themselves". Malibu has also established its own events, such as the Malibu Open, and "sponsors a large ski team that is heavily involved in the designing of the boats as well as promoting the Malibu products".

The Malibu Pro Team has consistently included several world champions and world record holders in wakeboarding, wakesurfing, and water skiing. As of 2002, Malibu Pro Team water skiers included Drew and Doug Ross, Jason Paredes, Mike Champion, and nine-time championship holder Chris Parrish. Wakeboarders included Mike Weddington, Josh Sanders, and Jerry Nunn. As of 2019, the wakeboarding and wakesurfing team consisted of: Raph Derome, Brian Grubb, Chad Sharpe, Olivier Derome, Luca Kidd, Massi Piffaretti, Jordan Wolfe, Stacia Bank, Jeff Langley, Parker Siegele, Rocker Steiner, Jamin Brown, You Hamazaki, Sanghyun Yun, Toshiki Yasui, Cobe Mikacich and Tarah Mikacich. The water ski team included Thomas Degasperi, Will Asher and current women’s world record holder Regina Jaquess.

As of 2019, water skiers had set thirteen world records behind one of Malibu's leading boats, the original Malibu Response TXi. In July 2019 Regina Jaquess set a new world record of four and a half buoys at 41' off as part of the Malibu Boats team, behind the new Malibu TXi.

As of 2019 the Axis Wake Research athlete team consists of Bec Gange, Tony Carroll, Austin Keen, Tom Fooshee, and Johnny Stieg.

== Celebrity supporters ==
Celebrity supporters and endorsers of the brand have included Jake Owen, Chase Elliott, T.J. Dillashaw, and the late Troy Gentry.
