= Ford Boss 302 engine =

Ford 302 H.O.
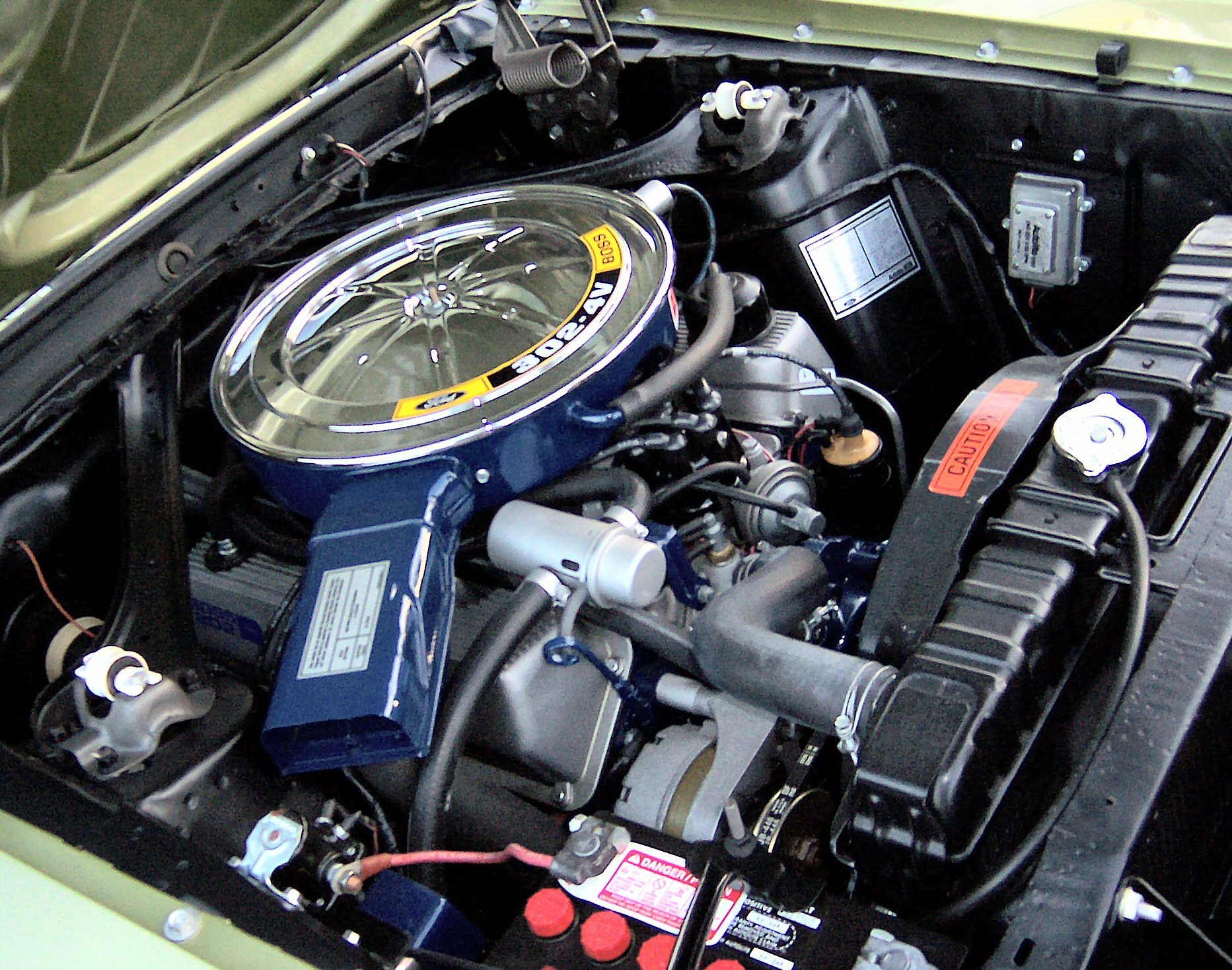

Overview
- Manufacturer: Ford Motor Company
- Production: 1969-1970

Layout
- Configuration: Naturally aspirated 90° V8
- Displacement: 302 cu in (4.9 L)
- Cylinder bore: 4 in (101.6 mm)
- Piston stroke: 3 in (76.2 mm)
- Cylinder block material: Cast iron
- Cylinder head material: Cast iron
- Valvetrain: OHV 2 valves x cyl.
- Compression ratio: 10.5:1

Combustion
- Fuel system: Holley Carburetor
- Fuel type: Gasoline
- Oil system: Wet sump
- Cooling system: Water-cooled

Output
- Power output: 290 hp (216 kW) at 5200 rpm
- Specific power: 59.2 hp (44.1 kW)/Liter
- Torque output: 290 lb⋅ft (393 N⋅m) at 4300 rpm

Chronology
- Successor: Ford Boss 351 V8

The Ford Boss 302 (formally the "302 H.O.") is a high-performance "small block" 302 cu in (4.9 L) V8 engine manufactured by Ford Motor Company. The original version of this engine was used in the 1969 and 1970 Boss 302 Mustangs and Cougar Eliminators and was constructed by attaching heads designed for the planned 351 Cleveland (which debuted the following year) to a Ford small block. The construction was aided by the two engines sharing a cylinder head bolt pattern, though the Boss heads had to have their coolant passages slightly modified.

An entirely new Boss 302 engine was introduced for the 2012 Ford Mustang using a variant of the Ford Modular engine.

== Design ==
The Ford small-block V8-based 1969–70 302 H.O. "Boss 302" engine was developed in 1968 for the SCCA's 1969 Trans-Am road racing series. Available only in the Boss 302 Mustang, it derived from a line that traced to the Ford 289 HiPo engine, not a stock "Windsor" 302. It had its own block, based on a unique thin-wall, high nickel content nodular iron casting, with performance upgrades that included solid lifters, much stronger 4-bolt rather than 2-bolt main crankshaft bearings, threaded rather than compression freeze plugs, and custom-fitted canted valve heads that gave it larger valves than on most engines more than a third greater in displacement. These "better breathing" heads were being developed for the planned 351 Cleveland (which debuted in late 1969 Mustangs) and shared a common cylinder head bolt pattern, but required slight modification of their coolant passages and special head gaskets to work on the Boss 302. Adjustable rocker studs, new long slot rockers, and closed 62cc combustion chamber heads were all used.

The block had a thicker deck and a taller intake manifold to accommodate the heads. The engine also had a distinct harmonic balancer, crankcase windage tray, bigger diameter alternator pulley (from the 289 HiPo), and bigger diameter power steering pulley, all to accommodate a higher-revving engine than the standard 302. Valve covers gained two bolts (up to eight), and were chromed in 1969 and cast aluminum in 1970. The high-performance connecting rods are the same as used in the 289 HiPo, 5.155" vs 5.09" for the stock Windsor 302. They are capable of handling up to approximately 8000 rpm, aided by a spot face for 3/8 in (9.5 mm) bolts with a unique football-shaped head (vs 5/16 for standard small blocks), and beefier cap. The crankshaft was a cross-drilled high-strength steel forging with hollow crankshaft throws; the cross-drilling was eliminated in 1970 for better reliability. The cam and lifters are high lift, with the cam featuring 290 degrees duration and .477 in (12.1 mm) of lift.

The wide and large port heads with staggered valve placement give the 302 H.O. high power capabilities. Because of the pent-roof design of the heads, the Boss also had forged pop-up pistons to achieve the desired 10.5:1 compression ratio. Early units were typically characterized by very large intake 2.23 inches (56.6 mm) and exhaust 1.7 inches (43.2 mm) valves sitting in a small quench style combustion chamber. Exhaust valves were sodium-filled to aid cooling. Valve springs were dual units with an inner and outer spring to minimize harmonic resonance at high RPM. The heads feature steel spring seats, screw-in rocker studs, pushrod guide plates to aid in pushrod stability at high RPMs, and adjustable rocker arms. Fuel was provided by a Holley 780 cu ft/min (22.1 m^{3}/min) manual choke carburetor. The taller intake required a thinner spacer, which incorporated an aluminum tube for the PCV hose and was made of phenolic resin to help isolate the carburetor from the heat of the intake. Ignition was handled by a dual point distributor firing unique small-diameter 14 mm (0.6 in) AF 32 Autolite spark plugs necessary to fit within the tight confines of the combustion chamber alongside the very large valves.

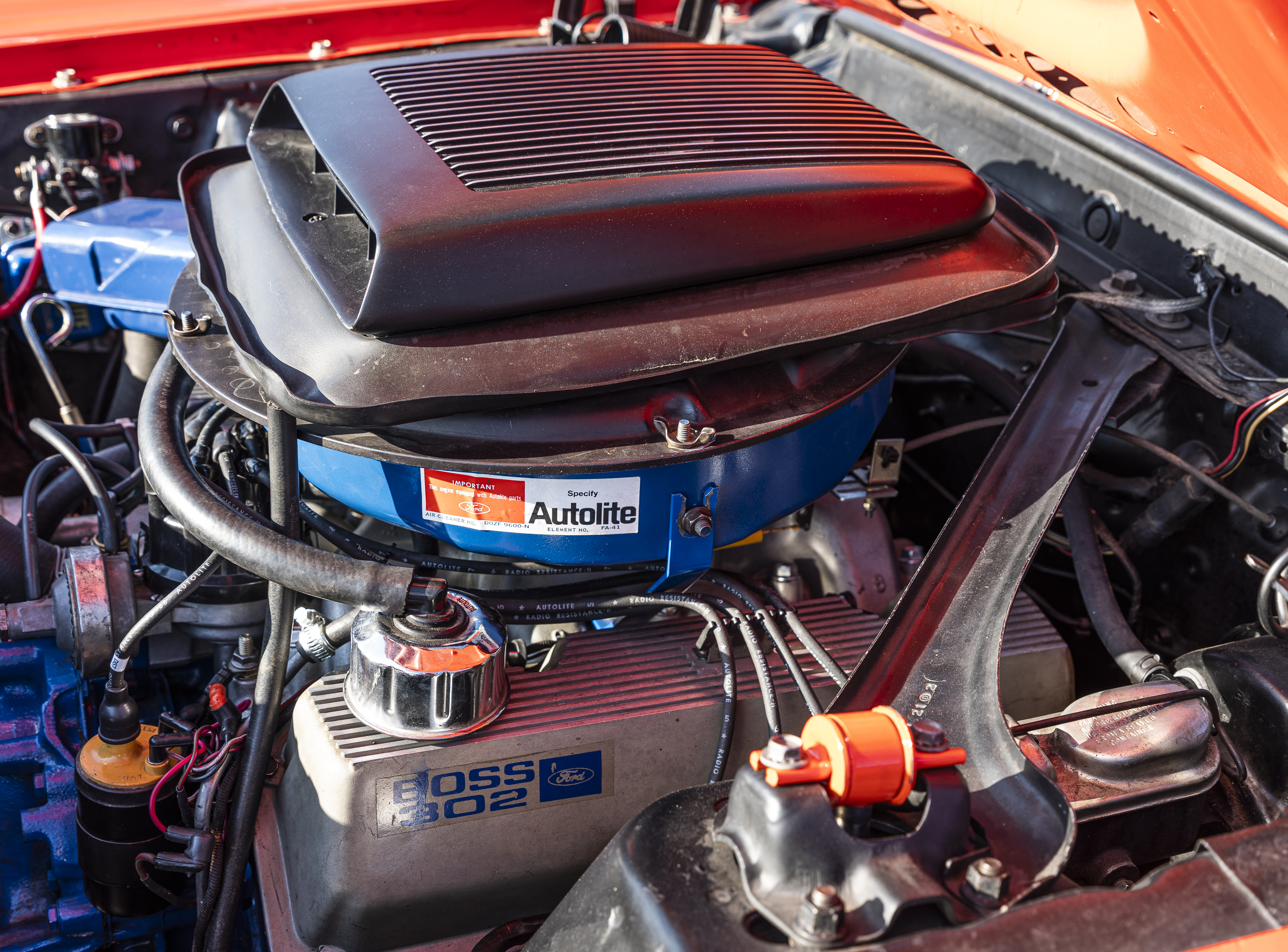
Ford Boss 302 Engine With Shaker scoop. Factory Finned Aluminum valve covers were unique to the canted valve Boss 302 engine.

At idle, a properly tuned engine's solid lifters produce a significant amount of 'chatter', giving the engine a unique sound.

Redline was 6,150 rpm, and power output conservatively rated at 290 hp (216 kW) gross at 5,200 rpm with maximum torque of 290 lb⋅ft (393 N⋅m) at 4300 rpm. The Boss 302 engine competes well with other high performance 'small blocks', such as the Chevy 302, the Chrysler 340, and the AMC 360.

The name "Boss", popular 1960s slang for "excellent" or "very cool", got attached to the Boss 302 Mustang by stylist Larry Shinoda in recognition of the enthusiasm of his boss, new Ford president Semon "Bunkie" Knudson (who had brought Shinoda over from GM's Chevrolet Division) for the car. Knudson told his designers, "I want to design a car that's the coolest Mustang out there. I don't want somebody else's name on it, like a Shelby." The model's widespread popularity resulted in the term "Boss 302" displacing "302 H.O.", the engine's formal name, in popular use.

This engine was also optional in the Mercury Cougar Eliminator, with a total of 169 produced in 1969 and 469 assembled in 1970.

== New Boss 302 (2007-) ==
The new Boss 302 engine was unveiled in the 2006 SEMA show.

In 2007, Ford Racing began marketing new crate engines using the "Boss 302" moniker with displacements between 302 to 360 cu in (4.95 to 5.9 L) that are rated from 340 to 360 hp (254 to 268 kW).

The double overhead cam, variable valve timing 444 hp (331 kW) Ford Modular "Coyote-Boss" engine is also marketed as a crate engine by Ford Racing.

== See also ==
- List of Ford engines
