= Marinisation =

Marinisation (also marinization) is design, redesign, or testing of products for use in a marine environment. Most commonly, it refers to use and long-term survival in harsh, highly corrosive salt water conditions. Marinisation is done by many manufacturing industries worldwide including many military organisations, especially navies.

In some instances, cost is not a guiding force, and items may be designed from scratch with entirely non-corrosive components engineered and assembled to resist the effects of vibration and constantly changing attitude. In others, particularly in "marinising" an existing product that was not designed specifically for a marine environment for sale in the public marketplace, a balance must be found between the competing criteria.

There are three main factors that need to be considered for a product to be truly marinised.

- Resistance to corrosion.
- Resistance to vibration.
- Ability to function properly in conditions of constantly changing attitude (an object's orientation about its center of gravity).

== Examples ==
=== Metals ===
Marinised metals include some of the following:

- Non-corrosive alloys that resist or are impervious to salt-water corrosion, e.g. 316 marine grade stainless steel; brass (an alloy of copper and zinc), or bronze (which contains copper with tin in place of zinc).

The adjectival phrase "marine grade" being used when the above alloys have all impurities removed and are suitable for exposure to a marine environment.

- Metals electroplated or dipped in a corrosion-resistant material, e.g. galvanised steel
- Metals painted with special anti rust or anti corrosion coatings
- Plastic coated metals

=== Electronics ===
Marinised electronics use one or more of the following protection methods. In most cases more than one method is used:

- Coating by a spray or dipping to protect from salt air and water.
- Full encapsulation in some form of resin or gel.
- Specialised mounting of internal parts for vibration protection.
- Use of specialised corrosion resistant solder and corrosion resistant metals.

=== Batteries ===
Marinised batteries are usually gel batteries or sealed maintenance-free batteries. Not using marinised batteries in salt water can be deadly in an enclosed environment for many reasons:

1. Sulfuric acid and salt water react to generate dangerous hydrogen chloride gas, necessitating the use of valve-regulated maintenance-free sealed batteries.
2. The battery must have stronger plates and separators to withstand constant vibrations and impacts caused by large waves striking the hull. Plate collapse can cause short-circuits and electrical fires or explosions.
3. A marine battery must function at any angle due to the changing attitude of the vessel it is mounted in. Gel VRLA batteries are best for this purpose.

== See also ==
- Marine electronics
