= Correct Craft =

American powerboat manufacturer

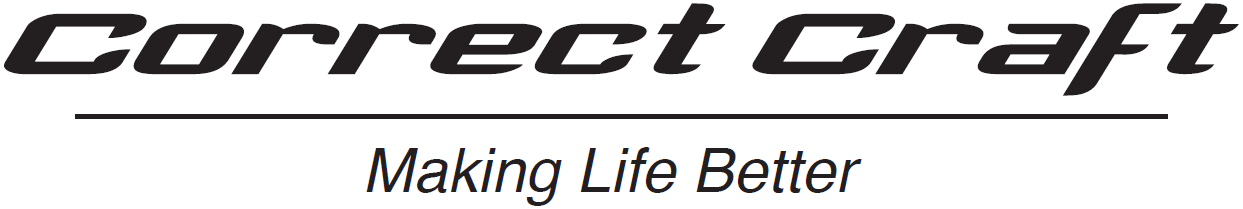
- Formerly: Florida Variety Boat Company, Pine Castle Boat and Construction Company
- Industry: Boatbuilder
- Founded: 1925
- Founder: Walter C. Meloon
- Key people: Bill Yeargin (President/CEO)
- Website: www.correctcraft.com

Correct Craft is a United States–based builder of powerboats primarily for waterskiing, wakeboard, and wakesurf use. It was founded in 1925 by Walt C. Meloon as the Florida Variety Boat Company. Correct Craft is the oldest family-owned and operated boat manufacturer in the world. The Correct Craft family includes Nautique, Centurion, Supreme, Bass Cat, Yar-Craft, SeaArk, Parker, and Ingenity boat companies, Pleasurecraft Engine Group, Indmar Marine Engines, Velvet Drive Transmissions, Mach Connections, Merritt Precision, Osmosis, Watershed Innovation, and Aktion Parks.

== History ==
Walter C. Meloon founded the Florida Variety Boat Company in 1925 in Pine Castle, Florida. In 1930, the company changed its name to Pine Castle Boat and Construction Company. Eight years later the company again rebranded as Correct Craft. The company was incorporated in 1947.

In 1945, American troops had reached the Rhine River but lacked the transport boats needed to cross it. Correct Craft was commissioned to supply the needed storm boats within a month's time. Reports vary on the number of boats required, placing the number between 300 and 600. At that time, Correct Craft produced less than 50 boats over the course of a month. The company did not work on Sundays, and despite production pressure, refused to open production on a Sunday. The production was finished ahead of schedule. National Geographic called it "A Miracle Production." The United States Army awarded the company an "E" flag for efficiency.

Walter C. Meloon retired from his position as company president in 1955, and his son, Walter O. Meloon, became the new president.

The company received a government contract for 3000 boats in 1957. Inspectors expecting a payoff began rejecting boats the company made when they received no compensation. At the end of the year, Correct Craft had delivered 2,200 approved boats but had 600 rejects on hand. The chief inspector returned 40 of the previously accepted boats. The order had cost the company more than it had made, putting it in debt. A complaint to the Corps of Engineers to honor their end of the contract was ignored. A creditor advised that Correct Craft seek protection under Chapter 11 of the Bankruptcy Act which would allow the company to continue operations, which it accepted in August 1958. Torrey Mosvold, head of Mosvold Shipping Company, loaned Correct Craft the capital needed to pay off its debts. The Pakistani government ordered more than 200 of the assault boats still sitting in Correct Craft's warehouse, as well as six larger boats. Local automobile dealer Bud Coleman granted the company a ten-year loan on the plant property. Correct Craft was released from Chapter 11 at the start of the year in 1965. Subsequently, the Corps of Engineers offered Correct Craft a $40,000 settlement to drop the previously filed complaint.

Correct Craft released its first Ski Nautique boat, the first fiberglass ski boat, designed by Leo Bentz, in 1961. It was the world's first tournament inboard ski boat. In 1986, SeaWorld signed a contract with Correct Craft to supply Ski Nautique boats for ski shows at their marine parks. In 1995, Suzuki obtained domestic rights as the only distributor of Correct Craft boats in Japan in exchange for Suzuki carrying only Correct Craft boats.

The Total Surface Control (TSC) hull design was released for the Ski Nautique in 1997. At that time, there were four models of the Ski Nautique available: the original Ski Nautique, the Sport Nautique introduced in 1989, Nautique Super Sport introduced in 1995, and Ski Nautique 19"6. The Sport Nautique was the official towboat of the Wakeboard World Championships, the U.S. Wakeboard Open, the Wakeboard Masters, and the U.S. National Wakeboard Championship in 1995 and 1996.

The Meloon family sold its stock in the company in 2008, and Ambassador Enterprises obtained full ownership of the company.

Under its subsidiary brand, Aktion Parks, Correct Craft acquired the Orlando Watersports Complex (OWC), the world's premier cable wake park, in August 2012. In September 2013, Correct Craft announced that Aktion Parks was building the Miami Watersports Complex, a 90-acre water sports park.

In October 2014, Correct Craft acquired PCM Marine Engines, Crusader Engines Inc., and Levitator Performance Airboat Engines which operate together as Pleasurecraft Engine Group. Correct Craft acquired Bass Cat Boats as well as Yar-Craft, a walleye boat line owned by Bass Cat, in March 2015. In June 2015, Correct Craft acquired majority interest in Centurion Boats and Supreme Boats, based in Merced, California. Correct Craft acquired SeaArk Boats, an aluminum finishing boat company based in Monticello, Arkansas, in May 2016.

In November 2022, Correct Craft announced the acquisition of Indmar Marine Engines, the "largest privately held maker of gasoline-powered inboard engines". They supply brands such as Tigé, Pavati, Supra, Moomba, and ATX, amongst others. Furthermore, in December 2022, they also acquired Pacer Marine Engineering.
