= MasterCraft =

American boat manufacturing company

MasterCraft Boat Company
- MasterCraft brand shield logo
- Type: Public
- Traded as: Nasdaq: MCFT; Russell 2000 Index component
- Industry: Towboat Industry, Marine Industry
- Founded: 1968; 58 years ago in Maryville, Tennessee
- Headquarters: Vonore, Tennessee, U.S.
- Key people: Brad Nelson – CEO; Scott Kent – CFO; Matt Long – CIO; Charlene Hampton – VP of HR; Jim Brown – VP of Operations; Greg Miller – VP of Global Sales; Krista Schipner – VP of Marketing; Phil Walker - Director Front Office
- Products: XSeries, XTSeries, NXT Series, XStar and ProStar
- Revenue: ▼US$284 million (2025)
- Net income: ▼US$7.04 million (2025)
- Number of employees: 920 (2024)
- Website: mastercraft.com

The MasterCraft Boat Company is an American manufacturer of luxury high-performance boats. The company was founded in 1968 in Maryville, Tennessee, and is currently headquartered in Vonore, Tennessee. MasterCraft boats are used in waterskiing, wakeboarding and wake surfing.

== History ==
MasterCraft's founder Rob Shirley was a young waterskiing instructor who opened a waterskiing school in Florida in 1965. In 1968, with the help of a few fellow waterskiers, he modified a Ski Nautique boat manufactured by Correct Craft. The boat was completed in August, and debuted at the U.S. Nationals in Canton, Ohio. In the same year, Rob was forced to close the waterskiing school, and moved to his wife's parents' farm in Maryville, Tennessee. There, he founded the MasterCraft Boat Company, which initially operated out of a two-horse barn.

During its first year of operation, MasterCraft only built 12 boats using the modified hull design. In 1994, the company's headquarters was relocated to Vonore, Tennessee. As of 2006, MasterCraft produced over 3,000 boats per year, sold in 25 different countries, by over 100 domestic and international dealers.

Some of the company's most popular products are the ProStar, a direct drive ski boat, and the X Series Wakeboard boats. Since 2012, all MasterCraft models use Ilmor Engineering inboard marine engines built on the General Motors 5.3L GDI, 6.0L MPI, and 6.2L GDI V8 engine blocks.

In 2007, the company was acquired by two private equity firms: Charlesbank Capital Partners and Transportation Resource Partners (affiliated with Roger Penske). In 2010, the company was recapitalized by Wayzata Investment Partners.

In May 2015, MCBC Holdings, Inc. filed for an IPO to raise $100M.

On July 17, 2015, Nasdaq announced that trading of MCBC Holdings Inc., operator of MasterCraft Boat Company, commenced on The Nasdaq Stock Market trading as (Nasdaq:MCFT).

== Notable Innovations ==
=== DockStar ===
2016 - MasterCraft substantially improves an inboard boat's operation in reverse with the introduction of DockStar, a rudder-based system that allows DockStar-equipped boats to maneuver predictably to both left and right, lessening the learning curve for new inboard boaters and taking the stress out of tight quarters like marinas and crowded docks. The system was awarded a National Marine Manufacturer's Association Innovation Award for 2017.

== CEOs/Presidents ==
Rob Shirley (1968-1984)

John P. Baird (1984-1985)

Rob Shirley (1985-)

Chuck West (1987-1995)

Jim Hoag (1995-1996)

Gary Lownsdale (1996-1998)

John Dorton (1999-2012)

Terry McNew (2012-2019)

Fred Brightbill (2019-2024)

Brad Nelson (2024–present)

== Team MasterCraft ==
=== Ski ===
- Ali Garcia
- Taylor Garcia
- Freddy Krueger
- Joel Poland
- Karen Truelove
- Freddie Winter

=== Wake ===
- Parks Bonifay
- Harley Clifford
- Meagan Ethell
- Tyler Higham
- Steel Lafferty

=== Surf ===
- Ashley Kidd
- Jett Lambert

=== Foil ===
- Ansley Pritchard
