= Wakesurfing =

Water sport

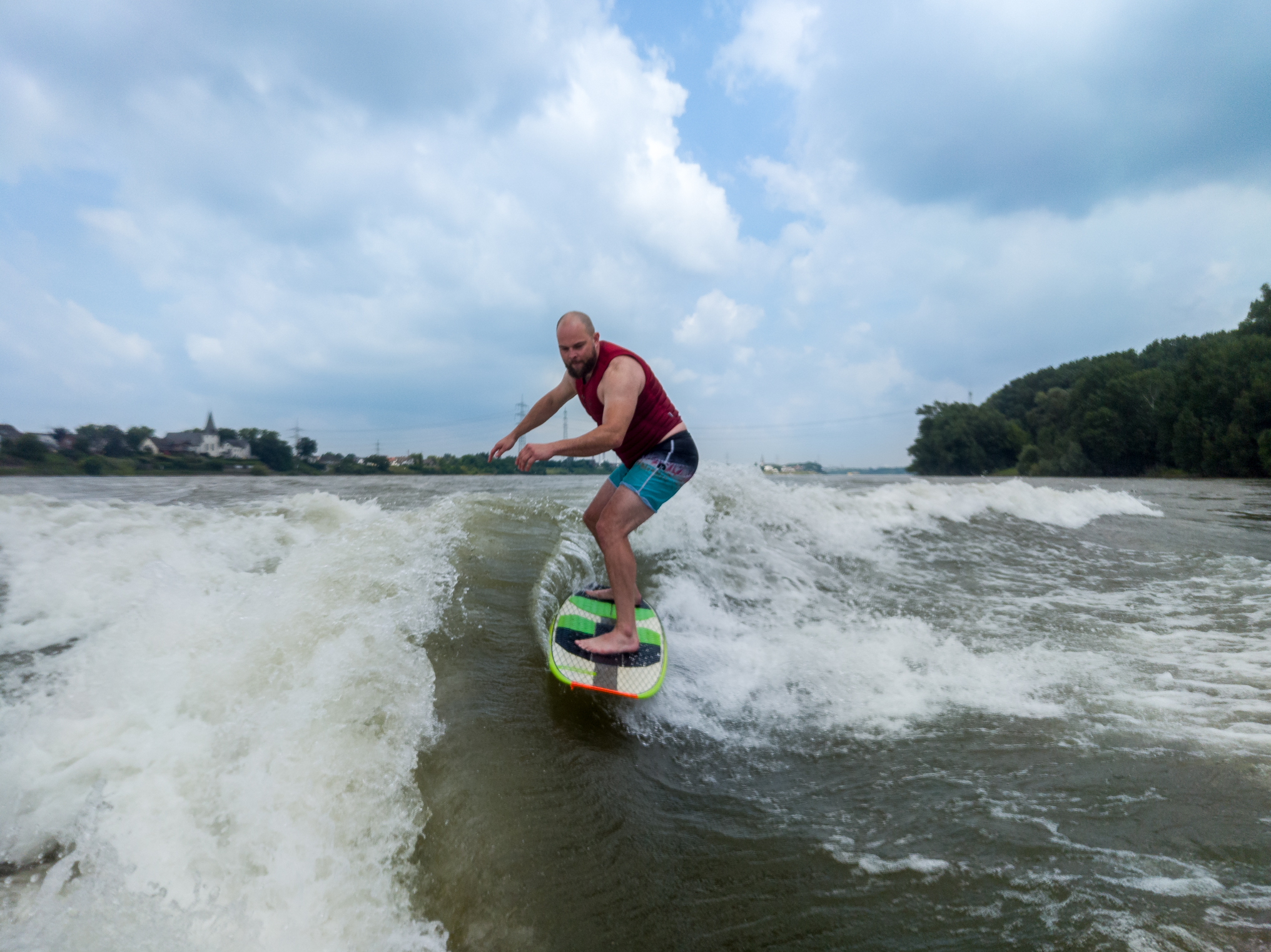
An example of someone wakesurfing.

Wakesurfing

Wakesurfing is a water sport in which a person surfs the wake that is created by a boat. Wakesurfers ride without rope; they use it only to be pulled by the boat from the water. After getting up on the wake, typically by use of a tow rope, the wakesurfers will drop the rope and ride the steep face below the wave's peak in a fashion reminiscent of surfing. Wakesurfers use special boards designed specifically for this sport.

== History ==
The origins of wakesurfing are a subject of contention, as various individuals and companies lay claim to its inception. Some assertions trace the roots of boat-surfing or wake-surfing back as far as the 1920s, but there is a lack of credible evidence to support these claims. Visual records and written media from the 1950s and 1960s depict surfers actively riding surfboards behind motorboats in ocean settings. During the mid-1960s, numerous surfboard manufacturers began asserting their involvement in crafting boards specifically designed for riding wakes.

The trend of riding surfboards behind boats persisted throughout the 1970s and 1980s. The boards used in this practice gradually evolved into shorter forms, mirroring the progression of shortboards in traditional surfing. As boards became shorter, practitioners drew inspiration from windsurfing and sailboarding by introducing foot-strapping devices on the boards to secure their feet. Utilizing tow ropes and making sharp turns and jumps off wakes gave rise to sports like skurfing, skiboarding, and eventually wakeboarding.

The increasing popularity of wakeboarding prompted advancements in watercraft technology to amplify the size of wakes. This development subsequently paved the way for wakesurfing to step into the spotlight. Numerous trailblazers in the sport, including but not limited to figures like Tim Lopes, Jerry Price, Jeff Page, Rick Lee, among others, are recognized for their pivotal roles in shaping modern wakesurfing. The first US design patent for a wakesurf board was granted to Alfonso Corona in 1997.

== Style and technique ==
In wakesurfing, there are 2 different disciplines, divided by the board type that the rider uses (which affects the style and tricks that are or could be performed). Riders can surf behind the boat using a skim or surf board.

Skim style wakesurf boards are characterized by their smaller size, typically featuring a narrower profile and less buoyancy compared to surf style boards. These boards are designed to mimic the feel of skimboarding and are favored by riders who enjoy technical tricks, limitless spins, and shove maneuvers. This style of riding is probably even closer to skate boarding than historical ocean surfing.

Surf style wakesurf boards were originally designed to emulate the feel of traditional surfing, with a focus on carving and riding the face of the wave. Modern surf style wakesurfing has evolved beyond traditional carving techniques, with riders now incorporating diverse stances and aerial maneuvers from various board sports disciplines. Surf boards are typically larger and more buoyant than skim style boards, offering better stability while riders push the boundaries of aerial tricks.

== Dangers ==
Boats without proper exhaust routing can expose the rider to dangerous levels of carbon monoxide. Inboard ski-style boats direct exhaust beneath the hull, reducing CO risk.

With the rise of wakesurfing in recent years, many individuals have attempted surfing behind boats ill-equipped to wakesurf. Boats with outboard motors or sterndrive propulsion are not suited for wakesurfing and lead to heightened risk, possible maiming or even death. The only types of boats safe to surf behind are direct drive or V-drive boats, because the propeller is located far beneath the boat rather than behind the boat.

The U.S. Coast Guard requires all wakesurfers to wear U.S. Coast Guard-approved personal flotation devices (PFDs). Many jurisdictions mandate Type III or higher PFDs for wakesurfing activities. Proper safety equipment also includes a designated spotter in the boat and adherence to minimum water depth requirements of at least 9 feet.

== Boat setup ==
A wakesurfer in San Diego Bay

Inboard ski or wakeboard boats are the most popular choice for this sport as the propeller is under the boat, and is less likely to make contact with the rider. Owners of inboard boats place ballast, such as water, lead weights, concrete, or other heavy objects in different sections of the boat in order to weight the boat down and create a larger wake. The best weight configuration for wakesurfing is to place the majority of the weight near the back corner side the surfer is surfing on. The deeper the boat is in the water, the bigger the wake will be overall. In addition, one will want to place a larger amount at the stern of the boat on the side which the rider is riding. This will ramp the wake up on the side the rider is riding and wash out the opposite side. A rope length of 2.43 to 3.04 meters (8.0 to 10.0 ft) is recommended. Wakesurf-intended ropes are generally 6.1 meters (20 ft) long, making it ideal for boats that have a tower set-up. Long ski and wakeboard ropes can become hazardous for wakesurfing, because it usually involves winding up the rope or tying unnecessary knots. Wakesurfing speeds generally range from 10-12 mph.

== Environmental impact and regulations ==
Wakesurfing has faced increased regulatory scrutiny due to environmental concerns. The larger wakes created by ballasted boats can cause shoreline erosion and disturb aquatic ecosystems. Many jurisdictions have implemented restrictions requiring wakesurfing to occur in deeper waters and at specified distances from shore.

Some areas have seasonal restrictions during fish spawning periods, and ballast systems require cleaning protocols to prevent the spread of aquatic invasive species between water bodies.

== Notable wakesurfers ==
- Ashley Kidd, winner of the 2014 and 2015 World Wake Surf Championships (pro women's division)
- Jake Caster, winner of the 2017 World Wake Surf Championships (pro men's skim division), runner-up 2018 World Wake Surf Championships (pro men's skim division) and placed 3rd in 2019 World Wake Surf Championships (pro men's surf division)
- Connor Burns, 2019 & 2018 World Champion Pro Men's wakesurfer; 2017 World Champion Amateur Men's wakesurfer.
- Drew Danielo, 7X World Champion and recipient of the Legend Award at the 2019 World Championships.
- Jodi Grassman, 4x consecutive World Wake Surf Champion (2017, 2018, 2019, 2020) of pro women's division

Recent World Wake Surfing Championship winners include competitors from the 2020-2024 events, with the sport continuing to grow internationally through organizations like the Competitive Wake Surf Association.

== Trick list ==
Many riders perform a wide array of maneuvers or specifically named 'tricks' while wakesurfing, with most owing their origins to surfing, skating (both vert and street) and snowboarding, Some of the most well-known tricks are:

- Pumping – Turning up and down the face of the wake to gain speed.
- Stalling – Applying pressure to the back foot to slow down or "stall".
- Floater – When a rider and board "floats" on top of the wake.
- Lip slide – Just like a floater, but the board is sideways.
- Spray – Gouging into the face of the wake to create the water under the rider to explode and spray.
- Fire hydrant – Placing one hand on the board and taking the front foot off.
- Posing – Doing hand and body positions while riding for cool style points.
- Hang 5 – Rider extends front foot (toes) over front of board.
- Rail grabs – Grabbing the board's rail while the board is on the wake – one or both hands.
- Cutbacks – Bashing off the lip of the wake with the board – the more extreme and risky the better.
- Paddle back in – Going to the extreme rear of the wake, throwing down on the board and paddling back into the power zone. This can also be done by pulling the outside rail of the board to bring it back to the power zone.
- Tubing it – Throwing down on the board and sliding back into the tube until covered up – the deeper the better, and then popping out and standing back up on the board.
- Switch stance – Riding with the opposite foot forward.
- Airs – Launching off the lip with board into the air and landing back on the wake (toeside or heelside).
- One-hand grab air – Grabbing one rail of the board while the board is airborne above the wake.
- Double Grab Air – Grabbing both rails of the board while the board is airborne above the wake.
- Hang 10 – Rider extends both feet (toes) over end of board.
- 180 spin – Spinning 180 on the wake – Board and rider spin.
- 360 spin – Spinning 360 on the face of the wake – Board and rider spin.
- 540 spin – Rider spins continuously 1 1/2 times until they are riding switch stance forward.
- 720 spin – Rider spins continuously 2 complete 360's.
- 900 spin – Rider spins continuously 2 1/2 times until they are riding switch stance forward.
- Air 180 – Doing an air while spinning 180 the blind direction.
- 180 air – Doing and air and spinning a 180 in the air and landing in with a switch stance.
- Body varial – Rider does an air and rotates 180º before landing back on the board. The board doesn't spin at all during this trick.
- 180 shove it – Spinning just the board 180 under the rider's feet and landing with the board "backwards".
- 360 shove it – Same as a 180 but you spin the board a full 360 under your feet. Note: rider does not spin only the board spins.
- 540 shove it – Rider does and air and uses his/her feet to spin the board a full 540º before landing back on the board.
- Big Spin – Same as a 360 shove-it, only the rider spins a 180 at the same time the board does a 360.

== In popular culture ==
In 2013, Canadian musician Chris Hau recorded a video in which he plays a song on an acoustic guitar while wakesurfing.

In February 2015, Hunter Sims, a professional wakesurfer, received a world record for doing 106 shove-its.

Many celebrities have taken up the sport with P!nk, Julianne Hough, and Gus Kenworthy among the ones spending their summers trying the activity.

World Champion Skimboarder Austin Keen launched an interview series with celebrities wakesurfing in 2020. His first guest was Diplo.

Kim Kardashian has tried wakesurfing in 2024 with a legendary rider Austin Keen.

4 July 2024 Mark Zuckerberg posted on his social media video wakesurfing with USA flag to celebrate Independence Day.
