= List of Water Ski World Championships champions =

Water Ski World Championships
- Status: Active
- Genre: Global sports event
- Frequency: Biannual
- Inaugurated: 1949
- Organiser: International Waterski & Wakeboard Federation / Cable Wakeboard World Council (CWWC)

This is a list of Water Ski World Championships champions in International Waterski & Wakeboard Federation (IWWF) and Cable Wakeboard World Council (CWWC) events.

== Styles ==
Championships in waterskiing and wakeboarding sports cover eight styles, with up to ten types each. The types are generally defined by age groups and open competitions in which anyone may enter.

As of 2009, championships are held in a total of 21 types:

- Adaptive: Open (1993)
  - World Championships for Adaptive (1993–2019)
- Barefoot: Open (1978), Junior (1995), Senior (2010), World Games (2001–2009)
  - World Championships for Barefoot (1978–2016)
  - Junior World Championships for Barefoot (1995–2016)
  - Senior World Championships for Barefoot (2010–2016)
- Cableski: Open (1998)
  - World Championships for Cableski (1998–2018)
- Cable Wakeboard: Open (2001), World Games (2005)
  - World Championships for Cable Wakeboard (2001–2008)
- Racing: Open (2019)
  - World Championships for Racing (2019)
- Ski Racing: Open (1979)
  - World Championships for Ski Racing (1979–2011)
- Wakeboard: Open (2001), World Games (2001–2013)
  - World Championships for Wakeboard (2001–2018)
- Water Skiing: Open (1949), Junior (1986), U21 (2003), University (2004), World Games (1981–2017), +35 (2010), +45 (2010), +55 (2010), +65 (2014)
  - U21 World Championships for Water Skiing (2003–2019)
  - Junior World Championships for Water Skiing (1986–2018)
  - University World Championships for Water Skiing (2004–2016)
  - World Cup (1996–present)

== Medals ==
Data for the following tables has been taken from IWWF records and German sports statistics website sport-komplett.de.

=== World Championships for Water Skiing (1949–2019) ===
World Championships for Water Skiing (1949–2019)
Country	Gold	Silver	Bronze	Total
USA	165	99	107	371
FRA	29	43	37	109
AUS	17	40	36	93
CAN	31	25	29	85
GBR	15	19	21	55
ITA	6	16	12	34
BLR	7	8	14	29
VEN	8	10	6	24
MEX	7	6	6	19
AUT	2	6	9	17
SUI	4	6	5	15
BEL	3	3	6	12
CZE	3	4	2	9
RUS	6	3	0	9
SWE	4	3	2	9
GRE	3	4	1	8
URS	3	3	1	7
ARG	1	3	2	6
CHI	2	1	2	5
LUX	2	2	1	5
GER	0	1	4	5
LEB	0	4	1	5
HOL	1	1	1	3
DEN	0	2	1	3
LIB	0	2	1	3
NZE	0	2	1	3
SAF	0	0	3	3
ESP	1	0	1	2
FIN	0	2	0	2
NZL	0	1	1	2
TCH	0	1	1	2
COL	0	0	2	2
FRG	0	1	0	1
PER	0	1	0	1
ISR	0	0	1	1

=== World Championships for Ski Racing (1979–2011) ===
Some medals unknown in database.

World Championships for Ski Racing (1979–2011)
Country	Gold	Silver	Bronze	Total
AUS	43	39	20	102
USA	28	28	26	82
GBR	3	8	15	26
BEL	4	2	5	11
ITA	1	3	7	11
GB	2	1	4	7
NZL	2	1	3	6
AUT	1	0	3	4
NZ	0	1	1	2
NED	0	1	0	1

=== World Championships for Cableski (1998–2018) ===
World Championships for Cableski (1998–2018)
Country	Gold	Silver	Bronze	Total
BLR	51	43	35	129
GER	9	17	10	36
AUT	10	4	5	19
SVK	2	4	12	18
ISR	5	5	5	15
CZE	1	3	5	9
POL	0	3	4	7
RUS	1	1	4	6
GBR	2	1	0	3
HUN	0	0	1	1

== Results ==
Year	Place	Slalom	Trick	Jump	Overall	Team
1949	Juan-les-Pins, France	Christian Jourdan, France	Pierre Gouin, France	Guy de Clercq, Belgium	Christian Jourdan, France	Not contested
1949	Juan-les-Pins, France	Willa Worthington; United States	Madeleine Boutellier; France	Willa Worthington; United States	Willa Worthington; United States	Not contested
1951	Cypress Gardens, United States	Dick Pope Jr., United States	Jack Andresen, United States	Guy de Clercq, Belgium	Dick Pope Jr., United States	Not contested
1951	Cypress Gardens, United States	Evie Wolford; United States	Willa Worthington-McGuire; United States	Johnette Kirkpatrick; United States	Willa Worthington-McGuire; United States	Not contested
1953	Toronto, Canada	Charles Blackwell, Canada	Warren Witherall, United States	Alfredo Mendoza, Mexico	Alfredo Mendoza, Mexico	Not contested
1953	Toronto, Canada	Evie Wolford; United States	Leah Marie Rawls; United States	Sandra Swaney; United States	Leah Marie Rawls; United States	Not contested
1955	Beirut, Lebanon	Alfredo Mendoza, Mexico	Scotty Scott, United States	Alfredo Mendoza, Mexico	Alfredo Mendoza, Mexico	Not contested
1955	Beirut, Lebanon	Willa Worthington-McGuire; United States	Marina Ricolfi-Doria; Switzerland	Willa Worthington-McGuire; United States	Willa Worthington-McGuire; United States	Not contested
1957	Cypress Gardens, United States	Joe Cash, United States	Mike Amsbury, United States	Joe Mueller, United States	Joe Cash, United States	Not contested
1957	Cypress Gardens, United States	Marina Ricolfi-Doria; Switzerland	Marina Ricolfi-Doria; Switzerland	Nancie Rideout; United States	Marina Ricolfi-Doria; Switzerland	Not contested
1959	Milan, Italy	Chuck Stearns, United States	Philippe Logut, France	Buster McCalla, United States	Chuck Stearns, United States	United States
1959	Milan, Italy	Vickie van Hook; United States	Piera Castelvetri; Italy	Nancie Rideout; United States	Vickie van Hook; United States	United States
1961	Long Beach, United States	Jimmy Jackson, United States	Jean-Marie Muller, France	Larry Penacho, United States	Bruno Zaccardi, Italy	United States
1961	Long Beach, United States	Janelle Kirtley; United States	Sylvie Hülsemann; Luxembourg	Renate Hansluvka; Austria	Sylvie Hülsemann; Luxembourg	United States
1963	Vichy, France	Billy Spencer, United States	Billy Spencer, United States	Jimmy Jackson, United States	Billy Spencer, United States	United States
1963	Vichy, France	Jeanette Brown; United States	Guyonne Dalle; France	Renate Hansluvka; Austria	Janet Brown; United States	United States
1965	Surfers Paradise Ski Gardens, Australia	Roland Hillier, United States	Ken White, United States	Larry Penacho, United States	Roland Hillier, United States	United States
1965	Surfers Paradise Ski Gardens, Australia	Barbara Cooper-Clack; United States	Dany Duflot; France	Liz Allan; United States	Liz Allan; United States	United States
1967	Sherbrooke, Canada	Tito Antuñano, Mexico	Alan Kempton, United States	Alan Kempton, United States	Mike Suyderhoud, United States	United States
1967	Sherbrooke, Canada	Liz Allan; United States	Dany Duflot; France	Jeanette Stewart-Wood; United Kingdom	Jeanette Stewart-Wood; United Kingdom	United States
1969	Copenhagen, Denmark	Víctor Palomo, Spain	Bruce Cockburn, Australia	Wayne Grimditch, United States	Mike Suyderhoud, United States	United States
1969	Copenhagen, Denmark	Liz Allan; United States				United States
1971	Barcelona, Spain	Mike Suyderhoud, United States	Ricky McCormick, United States	Mike Suyderhoud, United States	George Athans, Canada	United States
1971	Barcelona, Spain	Christy Freeman; United States	Willy Stähle; Netherlands	Christy Weir; United States	Christy Weir; United States	United States
1973	Bogotá, Colombia	George Athans, Canada	Wayne Grimditch, United States	Ricky McCormick, United States	George Athans, Canada	United States
1973	Bogotá, Colombia	Sylvie Maurial; France	María Víctoria Carrasco; Venezuela	Liz Allan-Shetter; United States	Lisa St John; United States	United States
1975	London, United Kingdom	Roby Zucchi, Italy	Wayne Grimditch, United States	Ricky McCormick, United States	Carlos Suárez, Venezuela	United States
1975	London, United Kingdom	Liz Allan-Shetter; United States	María Víctoria Carrasco; Venezuela	Liz Allan-Shetter; United States	Liz Allan-Shetter; United States	United States
1977	Milan, Italy	Bob LaPoint, United States	Carlos Suárez, Venezuela	Mike Suyderhoud, United States	Mike Hazelwood, United Kingdom	United States
1977	Milan, Italy	Cindy Todd; United States	María Víctoria Carrasco; Venezuela	Linda Giddens; United States	Cindy Todd; United States	United States
1979	Toronto, Canada	Bob LaPoint, United States	Patrice Martin, France	Mike Hazelwood, United Kingdom	Joel McClintock, Canada	United States
1979	Toronto, Canada	Pattsie Messner; Canada	Natalya Rumyantseva; Soviet Union	Cindy Todd; United States	Cindy Todd; United States	United States
1981	London, United Kingdom	Andy Mapple, United Kingdom	Cory Pickos, United States	Mike Hazelwood, United Kingdom	Sammy Duvall, United States	United States
1981	London, United Kingdom	Cindy Todd; United States	Ana María Carrasco; Venezuela	Deena Brush; United States	Karen Roberge; United States	United States
1983	Gothenburg, Sweden	Bob LaPoint, United States	Cory Pickos, United States	Sammy Duvall, United States	Sammy Duvall, United States	United States
1983	Gothenburg, Sweden	Cindy Todd; United States	Natalya Ponomaryeva; Soviet Union	Cindy Todd; United States	Anna Maria Carrasco; Venezuela	United States
1985	Toulouse, France	Bob LaPoint, United States	Patrice Martin, France	Geoff Carrington, Australia	Sammy Duvall, United States	United States
1985	Toulouse, France	Camille Duvall; United States	Judy McClintock; Canada	Deena Brush; United States	Karen Neville; Australia	United States
1987	London, United Kingdom	Bob LaPoint, United States	Patrice Martin, France	Sammy Duvall, United States	Sammy Duvall, United States	United States
1987	London, United Kingdom	Kim Laskoff; United States	Natalya Rumyantseva; Soviet Union	Deena Brush; United States	Deena Brush; United States	United States
1989	West Palm Beach, United States	Andy Mapple, United Kingdom	Aymeric Benet, France	Geoff Carrington, Australia	Patrice Martin, France	United States
1989	West Palm Beach, United States	Kim Laskoff; United States	Tawn Larsen; United States	Deena Brush-Mapple; United States	Deena Brush-Mapple; United States	United States
1991	Villach, Austria	Lucky Lowe, United States	Patrice Martin, France	Bruce Neville, Australia	Patrice Martin, France	Canada
1991	Villach, Austria	Helena Kjellander; Sweden	Tawn Larsen; United States	Sherri Slone; United States	Karen Neville; Australia	Canada
1993	Singapore	Brett Thurley, Australia	Tory Baggiano, United States	Andrea Alessi, Italy	Patrice Martin, France	Canada
1993	Singapore	Helena Kjellander; Sweden	Britt Larsen; United States	Kim de Macedo; Canada	Natalia Rumiantseva; Russia	Canada
1995	Roquebrune-sur-Argens, France	Andy Mapple, United Kingdom	Aymeric Benet, France	Bruce Neville, Australia	Patrice Martin, France	France
1995	Roquebrune-sur-Argens, France	Helena Kjellander; Sweden	Tawn Larsen; United States	Brenda Nichols; United States	Judy Messer; Canada	France
1997	Medellín, Colombia	Andy Mapple, United Kingdom	Kyle Peterson, United States	Jaret Llewellyn, Canada	Patrice Martin, France	France
1997	Medellín, Colombia	Helena Kjellander; Sweden	Britt Llarsen; United States	Elena Milakova; Russia	Elena Milakova; Russia	France
1999	Milan, Italy	Andy Mapple, United Kingdom	Jaret Llewellyn, Canada	Jaret Llewellyn, Canada	Patrice Martin, France	Canada
1999	Milan, Italy	Kristi Overton-Johnson; United States	Tawn Larsen-Hahn; United States	Emma Sheers; Australia	Elena Milakova; Russia	Canada
2001	Recetto, Italy	Andy Mapple, United Kingdom	Nicolas le Forestier, France	Jaret Llewellyn, Canada	Jaret Llewellyn, Canada	United States
2001	Recetto, Italy	Emma Sheers; Australia	Regina Jaquess; United States	Elena Milakova; Russia	Elena Milakova; Russia	United States
2003	Clermont, Florida, United States-Switzerland	Jeff Rodgers, United States	Jimmy Siemers, United States	Freddy Krueger, United States	Jimmy Siemers, United States	United States
2003	Clermont, Florida, United States-Switzerland	Emma Sheers; Australia	Mandy Nightingale; United States	Emma Sheers; Australia	Regina Jaquess; United States	United States
2005	Tianjin, China	William Asher, United Kingdom	Nicolas le Forestier, France	Jaret Llewellyn, Canada	Jimmy Siemers, United States	United States
2005	Tianjin, China	Regina Jaquess; United States	Mandy Nightingale; United States	Angeliki Andriopoulou; Greece	Regina Jaquess; United States	United States
2007	Linz, Austria	Thomas Degasperi, Italy	Nicolas le Forestier, France	Freddy Krueger, United States	Jaret Llewellyn, Canada	United States
2007	Linz, Austria	Nicole Arthur; United Kingdom	Lucine Clementine; France	Angeliki Andriopoulou; Greece	Lucine Clementine; France	United States
2009	Calgary, Canada	Will Asher, United Kingdom	Aliaksei Zharnasek, Belarus	Freddy Krueger, United States	Javier Julio, Argentina	Canada
2009	Calgary, Canada	Whitney Mcclintock; Canada	Whitney Mcclintock; Canada	Angeliki Andriopoulou; Greece	Whitney Mcclintock; Canada	Canada
2011	Dubna, Russia	Thomas DeGasperi, Italy	Aliaksei Zharnasek, Belarus	Freddy Krueger, United States	Adam Sedlmajer, Czech Republic	Belarus
2011	Dubna, Russia	Whitney Mcclintock; Canada	Natallia Berdnikava; Belarus	Natallia Berdnikava; Belarus	Natallia Berdnikava; Belarus	Belarus
2013	Santiago, Chile	Nate Smith, United States	Aliaksei Zharnasek, Belarus	Freddy Krueger, United States	Felipe Miranda, Chile	United States
2013	Santiago, Chile	Regina Jaquess; United States	Erika Lang; United States	Jacinta Carroll; Australia	Regina Jaquess; United States	United States
2015	Chapala, Mexico	Nate Smith, United States	Adam Pickos, United States	Ryan Dodd, Canada	Adam Sedlmajer, Czech Republic	Canada
2015	Chapala, Mexico	Regina Jaquess; United States	Anna Gay; United States	Jacinta Carroll; Australia	Regina Jaquess; United States	Canada
2017	Paris, France	Frederick Winter, United Kingdom	Adam Pickos, United States	Ryan Dodd, Canada	Felipe Miranda, Chile	United States
2017	Paris, France	Regina Jaquess; United States	Neilly Ross; Canada	Jacinta Carroll; Australia	Regina Jaquess; United States	United States
2019	Putrajaya, Malaysia	Joel Howley, Australia	Patricio Font, Mexico	Ryan Dodd, Canada	Martin Kolman, Czech Republic	Canada
2019	Putrajaya, Malaysia	Manon Costard; France	Anna Gay; United States	Jacinta Carroll; Australia	Whitney McClintock Rini; Canada	Canada
2021	Groveland, United States	Nate Smith, United States	Dorien Llewellyn; Canada	Ryan Dodd; Canada	Joel Poland; United Kingdom	Canada
2021	Groveland, United States	Jaimee Bull; Canada	Anna Gay; United States	Jacinta Carroll; Australia	Aliaksandra Danisheuskaya; Belarus	Canada
2023	Groveland, United States	Frederick Winter, United Kingdom	Patricio Font; Mexico	Ryan Dodd; Canada	Louis Duplan-Fribourg; France	United States
2023	Groveland, United States	Jaimee Bull; Canada	Erika Lang; United States	Hanna Straltsova	Hanna Straltsova	United States
2025	Recetto, Italy	Nate Smith, United States	Matías González; Chile	Joel Poland; United Kingdom	Dorien Llewellyn; Canada	United States
2025	Recetto, Italy	Jaimee Bull; Canada	Neilly Ross; Canada	Hanna Straltsova; United States	Hanna Straltsova; United States	United States

== List of Ski Racing World champions ==
Year	Place	Open	Formula 2	Junior	Team
1979	United Kingdom	Wayne Richie, Australia			
1979	United Kingdom	Bronwyn Wright; Australia			
1981	Italy	Danny Bertels, Belgium			
1981	Italy	Liz Hobbs; United Kingdom			
1983	Australia	Danny Bertels, Belgium			
1983	Australia	Liz Hobbs; United Kingdom			
1985	Spain	Mark Pickering, Australia			
1985	Spain	Debbie Nordblad; United States			
1987	Australia	Steven Moore and Steyn Kotzé, United Kingdom			
1987	Australia	Tanya Williams; Australia			
1989	Italy	Ian Dipple, Australia			
1989	Italy	Marsha Fitzgerald; United States			
1991	Australia	Paul Robertson, Australia			
1991	Australia	Debbie Nordblad; United States			
1993	France	Kirk Book, United States			
1993	France	Leanne Brown; Australia			
1995	Belgium	Stefanio Gregorio, Italy		Alex Ross, Australia	
1995	Belgium	Leanne Brown; Australia		Tami Kahn; United States	
1997	Australia	Wayne Mawer, Australia		Robbie Penny, Australia	
1997	Australia	Leanne Brown; Australia		Ann Procter; Australia	
1999	Spain	Stephen Robertson, Australia		Kyle Cummings, United States	
1999	Spain	Joanne Hamilton; Australia		Ashley Lathrop; United States	
2001	United States	Stephen Robertson, Australia		Marshall Cole, United States	
2001	United States	Ann Procter; Australia		Kristy Sloane; New Zealand	
2003	United States	Martie Wells, United States	Dimitri Bertels, Belgium	Chris Stout, Australia	
2003	United States	Ann Procter; Australia	Janine Doherty, United States	Katelin Wendt; United States	
2005	United Kingdom	Todd Haig, United States	Justin Soller, United States	Sam Frey, United States	
2005	United Kingdom	Kim Lumley; United Kingdom	Lauryn Eagle, Australia	Mallory Nordblad; United States	
2007	New Zealand	Jason Walmsley; Australia	Chris Stout; Australia	Jaaron Fritz; New Zealand	
2007	New Zealand	Ann Procter; Australia	Tania Teelow; Australia	Trudi Stout; Australia	
2009	Belgium	Wayne Mawer; Australia	Steven Van Gaeveren; Belgium	Jack Houston; Australia	
2009	Belgium	Kim Lumley; United Kingdom	Kathrin Ortlieb; Austria	Yolien Bormans; Belgium	
2011	Australia	Chris Stout; Australia	Grant Turner; Australia	Jack Houston; Australia	
2011	Australia	Katelin Wendt; United States	Leanne Campbell; Australia	Kelsey Feros; Australia	
2013	Spain	Wayne Mawer; Australia	Ben Gulley; Australia	Jack Harrison; Australia	
2013	Spain	Trudi Stout; Australia	Sarah Teelow; Australia	Rachel Stapleton; Australia	
2015	New Zealand	Peter Procter; Australia	Ben Gulley; Australia	Jack Harrison; Australia	Australia
2015	New Zealand	Leanne Campbell; Australia	Kelsey Feros; Australia	Ellen Jones; Australia	
2017	United States	Ben Gulley; Australia	Cameron Osborne; Australia	Luke Harrison; Australia	Australia
2017	United States	Chelsea Blight; Australia	Ellen Jones; Australia	Milana Long; Australia	
2019	France	Ben Gulley; Australia	Lachlan Nix; Australia	Carter Robertson and Steyn Kotzé; Australia	Australia
2019	France	Ellen Jones; Australia	Sylvia de Spiegelerie; Belgium	Nellie McMillan; Australia	

== List of Cable Ski World champions ==
Year	Place	Gender	Slalom	Trick	Jump	Overall	Team
1998	St. Leon-Rot, Germany	Male	Nir Shinuk, Israel	Alexsei Zharnosek, Belarus	Manfred Hintringer, Austria	Michal Cerny, Czech Republic	Belarus
1998	St. Leon-Rot, Germany	Male	Marc Andre Meier, Germany	Viatcheslav Durnov, Belarus	Daniel Resl, Czech Republic	Michael Mader, Germany	Belarus
1998	St. Leon-Rot, Germany	Male	Gabor Gyursanzky, Hungary	Martin Kocur, Czech Republic	Michal Cerny, Czech Republic	Daniel Resl, Czech Republic	Czech Republic
1998	St. Leon-Rot, Germany	Female	Sabine Haberle, Germany	Olga Pavlova, Belarus	Britta Llewellyn, Austria	Julia Gromyko Meier, Belarus	Czech Republic
1998	St. Leon-Rot, Germany	Female	Lisa Adams, United Kingdom	Tatiana Avodina, Belarus	Irina Tourets, Belarus	Irina Tourets, Belarus	Germany
1998	St. Leon-Rot, Germany	Female	Bronislava Machova, Slovakia	Julia Gromyko Meier, Belarus	Bronislava Machova, Slovakia	Olga Pavlova, Belarus	Germany
2000	Piešťany, Slovakia	Male	Alois Kreen, Austria	Alexsei Zharnosek, Belarus	Manfred Hintringer, Austria	Alexsei Zharnosek, Belarus	Belarus
2000	Piešťany, Slovakia	Male	Alexander Graw, Germany	Jouri Rykter, Belarus	Daniel Resl, Czech Republic	Andres Pape, Germany	Belarus
2000	Piešťany, Slovakia	Male	Marc Andre Meier, Germany	Maksim Semavine, Belarus	Jochen Luers, Germany	Michael Mader, Germany	Germany
2000	Piešťany, Slovakia	Female	Lisa Adams, United Kingdom	Julia Gromyko Meier, Belarus	Britta Llewellyn, Austria	Julia Gromyko Meier, Belarus	Germany
2000	Piešťany, Slovakia	Female	Irina Tourets, Belarus	Irina Tourets, Belarus	Julia Gromyko Meier, Belarus	Irina Tourets, Belarus	Austria
2000	Piešťany, Slovakia	Female	Julia Gromyko Meier, Belarus	Tatiana Avdonina, Belarus	Olga Pavlova, Slovakia	Olga Pavlova, Belarus	Austria
2002	Alfsee, Germany	Male	Alexander Graw, Germany	Alexsei Zharnosek, Belarus	Thomas Bauer, Germany	Alexsei Zharnosek, Belarus	Belarus
2002	Alfsee, Germany	Male	Alois Krenn, Austria	Viatcheslav Durnov, Belarus	Manfred Hintringer, Austria	Andres Pape, Germany	Belarus
2002	Alfsee, Germany	Male	Simon Hermann, Germany	Jouri Rykter, Belarus	Daniel Resl, Czech Republic	Miroslav Hribik, Slovakia	Germany
2002	Alfsee, Germany	Female	Lisa Adams, United Kingdom	Olga Pavlova, Belarus	Irina Tourets, Belarus	Irina Tourets, Belarus	Germany
2002	Alfsee, Germany	Female	Nadine Wich, Germany	Julia Gromyko Meier, Belarus	Julia Gromyko Meier, Belarus	Julia Gromyko Meier, Belarus	Slovakia
2002	Alfsee, Germany	Female	Bronislava Machova, Hungary	Irina Tourets, Belarus	Olga Pavlova, Belarus	Olga Pavlova, Belarus	Slovakia
2006	Schloss Dankern, Germany	Male	-	-	-	-	-
2006	Schloss Dankern, Germany	Male	-	-	-	-	-
2006	Schloss Dankern, Germany	Male	-	-	-	-	-
2006	Schloss Dankern, Germany	Female	-	Julia Gromyko Meier, Belarus	Julia Gromyko Meier, Belarus	Julia Gromyko Meier, Belarus	-
2006	Schloss Dankern, Germany	Female	-	-	-	-	-
2006	Schloss Dankern, Germany	Female	-	-	-	-	-
2010	Tel Aviv, Israel	Male	Or Shinuk, Israel	-	Manfred Hintringer, Austria	Moshiko Tzdaka, Israel	Belarus
2010	Tel Aviv, Israel	Male	Simon Hermann, Germany	-	Moshiko Tzdaka, Israel	Nikita Papakul, Belarus	Belarus
2010	Tel Aviv, Israel	Male	Moshiko Tzdaka, Israel	-	Robin Senge, Germany	Siarhei Bushyn, Belarus	Poland
2010	Tel Aviv, Israel	Female	-	Julia Gromyko Meier, Belarus	-	Irina Tourets, Belarus	Poland
2010	Tel Aviv, Israel	Female	-	Tatiana Churakova, Russia	Julia Gromyko Meier, Belarus	Olga Pavlova, Belarus	Germany
2010	Tel Aviv, Israel	Female	-	Olga Pavlova, Belarus	-	Julia Gromyko Meier, Belarus	Germany

== See also ==
- Water skiing
- List of Water Skiing European Champions
- List of Water Skiing Under-21 European Champions
- List of Water Skiing Under-17 European Champions
- World Waveski Surfing Titles
- Aquabike World Championship
