= Water skiing at the World Games =

Water skiing was introduced as a World Games sport at the 1981 World Games in Santa Clara, California.

== Medalists ==
=== Current events ===
==== Men ====
===== Slalom =====
| Games | Gold | Silver | Bronze |
|---|---|---|---|
| 1981 Santa Clara | Bob LaPoint (USA) | Andy Mapple (GBR) | Mike Neville (AUS) |
| 1985 London | John Battleday (GBR) | Marco Merlo (ITA) | Andrew Rooke (GBR) |
| 1989 Karlsruhe | Patrice Martin (FRA) | Marco Bettosini (SUI) | Shawn Bronson (GBR) |
| 1993 The Hague | John Battleday (GBR) | John Levingston (AUS) | Neil Ritchie (AUS) |
| 1997 Lahti | Javier Julio (ARG) | Jason Seels (GBR) | Michael McCormick (USA) |
| 2013 Cali | Thomas Degasperi (ITA) | Aaron Larkin (NZL) | Karl Johan Efverstrom (SWE) |
| 2017 Wrocław | Adam Sedlmajer (CZE) | Steve Neveu (CAN) | Thomas Degasperi (ITA) |
| 2022 Birmingham | Nate Smith (USA) | Brando Caruso (ITA) | Cole McCormick (CAN) |

===== Tricks =====
| Games | Gold | Silver | Bronze |
|---|---|---|---|
| 1981 Santa Clara | Patrice Martin (FRA) | Carl Roberge (USA) | Sammy Duvall (USA) |
| 1985 London | Patrice Martin (FRA) | John Battleday (GBR) | Bernd Jung (FRG) |
| 1989 Karlsruhe | Patrice Martin (FRA) | Paul Studd (GBR) | Andrew Rooke (GBR) |
| 1993 The Hague | Patrice Martin (FRA) | Russell Gay (USA) | Oleg Deviatovskiy (BLR) |
| 1997 Lahti | Javier Julio (ARG) | Jason Seels (GBR) | Ryan Green (AUS) |
| 2013 Cali | Aliaksei Zharnasek (BLR) | Nicholas Benatti (ITA) | Jason McClintock (CAN) |
| 2017 Wrocław | Josh Briant (AUS) | Pierre Ballon (FRA) | Olivier Fortamps (BEL) |
| 2022 Birmingham | Adam Pickos (USA) | Danylo Filchenko (UKR) | Pierre Ballon (FRA) |

===== Jump =====
| Games | Gold | Silver | Bronze |
|---|---|---|---|
| 1981 Santa Clara | Sammy Duvall (USA) | Mike Hazelwood (GBR) | Glen Thurlow (AUS) |
| 1985 London | Pierre Carmin (FRA) | Neil Ritchie (AUS) | Marco Merlo (ITA) |
| 1989 Karlsruhe | John Wiswall (USA) | Karl Ahamer (AUT) | Andrew Rooke (GBR) |
| 1993 The Hague | Oleg Deviatovskiy (BLR) | Patrice Martin (FRA) | John Levingston (AUS) |
| 1997 Lahti | Jason Seels (GBR) | Michael McCormick (USA) | Simon Siegert (COL) |
| 2013 Cali | Damien Sharman (GBR) | Rodrigo Miranda (CHI) | Igor Morozov (RUS) |
| 2017 Wrocław | Bojan Schipner (GER) | Rodrigo Miranda (CHI) | Aliaksandr Isayeu (BLR) |
| 2022 Birmingham | Danylo Filchenko (UKR) | Taylor Garcia (USA) | Tobías Giorgis (ARG) |

===== Wakeboarding =====
| Games | Gold | Silver | Bronze |
|---|---|---|---|
| 2001 Akita | Rodolphe Vinh-Tung (FRA) | Morgan Krause (RSA) | Fabrizio Bennelli (ITA) |
| 2005 Duisburg | Phillip Soven (USA) | Matthew Lammers (RSA) | Matthias Koban (SUI) |
| 2009 Kaohsiung | Andrew Adkison (USA) | Kyle Rattray (CAN) | Padiwat Jaemjan (THA) |
| 2013 Cali | Andrew Adkison (USA) | Toshiki Yasui (JPN) | David O'Caoimh (RUS) |
| 2017 Wrocław | Shota Tezuka (JPN) | Yun Sang-hyun (KOR) | Guy Firer (ISR) |
| 2022 Birmingham | Nic Rapa (AUS) | Stefano Comollo (ITA) | Maxime Roux (FRA) |

==== Women ====
===== Slalom =====
| Games | Gold | Silver | Bronze |
|---|---|---|---|
| 1981 Santa Clara | Cindy Benzel (USA) | Sue Fieldhouse (AUS) | Cindy Todd (USA) |
| 1985 London | Helena Kjellander (SWE) | Susy Graham (CAN) | Karen Morse (GBR) |
| 1989 Karlsruhe | Philippa Roberts (GBR) | Kim DeMacedo (CAN) | Valerie Bedoni (SUI) |
| 1993 The Hague | Philippa Roberts (GBR) | Natalya Rumyantseva (RUS) | April Coble (USA) |
| 1997 Lahti | Rhoni Barton (USA) | Sarah Gatty-Saunt (GBR) | Angeliki Andriopoulou (GRE) |
| 2013 Cali | Regina Jquess (USA) | Whitney McClintock (CAN) | Claire-Lise Welter (FRA) |
| 2017 Wrocław | Geena Krueger (GER) | Clementine Lucine (FRA) | Kate Adriaensen (BEL) |
| 2022 Birmingham | Regina Jaquess (USA) | Jaimee Bull (CAN) | Geena Krueger (GER) |

===== Tricks =====
| Games | Gold | Silver | Bronze |
|---|---|---|---|
| 1981 Santa Clara | Ana María Carrasco (VEN) | Karin Roberge (USA) | Anita Carlman (SWE) |
| 1985 London | Helena Kjellander (SWE) | Judy McClintock (CAN) | Nicola Rasey (GBR) |
| 1989 Karlsruhe | Kim DeMacedo (CAN) | Philippa Roberts (GBR) | Claudia Gusenbauer (AUT) |
| 1993 The Hague | Olga Pavlova (BLR) | Natalya Rumyantseva (RUS) | Julia Gromyko (BLR) |
| 1997 Lahti | Angeliki Andriopoulou (GRE) | Sarah Gatty-Saunt (GBR) | Yelena Milakova (RUS) |
| 2013 Cali | Clementine Lucine (FRA) | Erika Lang (USA) | Michale Briant (AUS) |
| 2017 Wrocław | Natallia Berdnikava (BLR) | Clementine Lucine (FRA) | Giannina Bonnemann (GER) |
| 2022 Birmingham | Neilly Ross (CAN) | Anna Gay (USA) | Aaliyah Yoong Hanifah (MAS) |

===== Jump =====
| Games | Gold | Silver | Bronze |
|---|---|---|---|
| 1981 Santa Clara | Marlon van Dijk (NED) | Sue Lipplegoes (AUS) | Cindy Todd (USA) |
| 1985 London | Karen Morse (GBR) | Jane Segal (USA) | Judy McClintock (CAN) |
| 1989 Karlsruhe | Kim DeMacedo (CAN) | Britta Grebe (AUT) | Claudia Gusenbauer (AUT) |
| 1993 The Hague | Olga Pavlova (BLR) | Philippa Roberts (GBR) | Kim DeMacedo (CAN) |
| 1997 Lahti | Emma Sheers (AUS) | Brenda Baldwin (USA) | Rhoni Barton (USA) |
| 2013 Cali | Regina Jaquess (USA) | Marie Vympranietsova (GRE) | Whitney McClintock (CAN) |
| 2017 Wrocław | Natallia Berdnikava (BLR) | Marie Vympranietsova (GRE) | Jutta Menestrina (FIN) |
| 2022 Birmingham | Lauren Morgan (USA) | Taryn Grant (CAN) | Valentina González (CHI) |

===== Wakeboarding =====
| Games | Gold | Silver | Bronze |
|---|---|---|---|
| 2001 Akita | Mero Narita (JPN) | Leza Bugden (AUS) | Kiyomi Suzuki (JPN) |
| 2005 Duisburg | Chen Lili (CHN) | Megan McNeil (USA) | Roberta Rendo (ARG) |
| 2009 Kaohsiung | Dallas Friday (USA) | Raimi Merritt (USA) | Miku Asai (JPN) |
| 2013 Cali | Han Qiu (CHN) | Charlotte Bryant (GBR) | Larisa Aminta Morales Gonzalez (MEX) |
| 2017 Wrocław | Nicola Butler (USA) | Erika Lang (USA) | Alice Virag (ITA) |
| 2022 Birmingham | Hinata Yoshihara (JPN) | Eugenia De Armas (ARG) | Taylor McCullough (USA) |

=== Discontinued events ===
==== Men ====
===== Three event =====
| Games | Gold | Silver | Bronze |
|---|---|---|---|
| 1981 Santa Clara | Sammy Duvall (USA) | Carl Roberge (USA) | Mike Neville (AUS) |
| 2001 Akita | Patrice Martin (FRA) | Jason Seels (GBR) | Thomas Asher (GBR) |
| 2005 Duisburg | Ryan Green (AUS) | Rodrigo Miranda (CHI) | Oleg Deviatovskiy (BLR) |
| 2009 Kaohsiung | Rodrigo Miranda (CHI) | Storm Selsor (USA) | Martin Bartalsky (SVK) |

===== Barefoot three event =====
| Games | Gold | Silver | Bronze |
|---|---|---|---|
| 2001 Akita | Keith St. Onge (USA) | David Small (GBR) | Evert Aartsen (NED) |
| 2005 Duisburg | David Small (GBR) | Patrick Wehner (FRA) | Evert Aartsen (FIN) |
| 2009 Kaohsiung | Keith St. Onge (USA) | Heinrick Sam (RSA) | David Small (GBR) |

===== Barefoot slalom =====
| Games | Gold | Silver | Bronze |
|---|---|---|---|
| 1997 Lahti | Massimiliano Colosio (ITA) | Massimo Mastelli (ITA) | Evert Aartsen (NED) |
| 2001 Akita | Keith St. Onge (USA) | David Small (GBR) | Evert Aartsen (NED) |

===== Barefoot tricks =====
| Games | Gold | Silver | Bronze |
|---|---|---|---|
| 1997 Lahti | Jan Baillien (BEL) | Jason Lee (USA) | Massimo Mastelli (ITA) |
| 2001 Akita | Keith St. Onge (USA) | David Small (GBR) | Patrick Wehner (GBR) |

===== Barefoot jump =====
| Games | Gold | Silver | Bronze |
|---|---|---|---|
| 1997 Lahti | Massimiliano Colosio (ITA) | Brett New (AUS) | Jan Baillien (BEL) |
| 2001 Akita | Terry Gregory (GER) | Bevan Kelly (NZL) | Massimiliano Colosio (ITA) |

===== Cable wakeboarding =====
| Games | Gold | Silver | Bronze |
|---|---|---|---|
| 2005 Duisburg | Joshua Rice (USA) | Benjamin Süss (GER) | Nicholas Davies (GBR) |

==== Women ====
===== Three event =====
| Games | Gold | Silver | Bronze |
|---|---|---|---|
| 1981 Santa Clara | Ana María Carrasco (VEN) | Anta Carlman (SWE) | Karin Roberge (USA) |
| 2001 Akita | Yelena Milakova (RUS) | Angeliki Andripoulou (GRE) | Sarah Gatty-Saunt (GBR) |
| 2005 Duisburg | Tarah Benzel (USA) | Megan Louise Ross (NZL) | Jenna Mielzynski (CAN) |
| 2009 Kaohsiung | Kate Adriaensen (BEL) | Manon Costard (FRA) | Caroline Hensley (USA) |

===== Barefoot three event =====
| Games | Gold | Silver | Bronze |
|---|---|---|---|
| 2001 Akita | Nadine de Villiers (RSA) | Rachel George (USA) | Kirsten Grønvik (NOR) |
| 2005 Duisburg | Kirsten Grønvik (NOR) | Gizella Halasz (AUS) | Emily Goldie (GBR) |
| 2009 Kaohsiung | Elaine Heller (USA) | Ashleigh Stebbeings (AUS) | Shannon Heller (USA) |

===== Barefoot slalom =====
| Games | Gold | Silver | Bronze |
|---|---|---|---|
| 1997 Lahti | Nadine de Villiers (RSA) | Charise Jones (AUS) | Lucy Scopes (GBR) |
| 2001 Akita | Nadine de Villiers (RSA) | Rachel George (AUS) | Kirsten Grønvik (NOR) |

===== Barefoot tricks =====
| Games | Gold | Silver | Bronze |
|---|---|---|---|
| 1997 Lahti | Lucy Scopes (GBR) | Steffi Hermann (GER) | Charise Jones (AUS) |
| 2001 Akita | Nadine de Villiers (RSA) | Rachel George (USA) | Kirsten Grønvik (NOR) |

===== Barefoot jump =====
| Games | Gold | Silver | Bronze |
|---|---|---|---|
| 1997 Lahti | Nadine de Villiers (RSA) | Steffi Hermann (GER) | Gizella Halasz (AUS) |
| 2001 Akita | Nadine de Villiers (RSA) | Rachel George (AUS) | Kirsten Grønvik (NOR) |

===== Cable wakeboarding =====
| Games | Gold | Silver | Bronze |
|---|---|---|---|
| 2005 Duisburg | Denise de Haan (NED) | Kirsten Leifels (GER) | Pauline Dyrschka (GER) |
