= 2019 in aquatic sports =

This article lists the in the water and on the water forms of aquatic sports for 2019.

== Aquatics ==
=== FINA ===
- July 12–28: 2019 World Aquatics Championships in (South Korea) Gwangju
  - China won the gold medal tally. The United States won the overall medal tally.
- August 5–18: 2019 FINA World Masters Championships in (South Korea) Gwangju
  - For results, click here.
- August 20–25: 2019 FINA World Junior Swimming Championships in (Hungary) Budapest
  - The United States won both the gold and overall medal tallies.

=== Ligue Européenne de Natation ===
- May 10–12: 2019 European Synchronized Swimming Champions Cup in St Petersburg
  - Duet Technical/Free winners: Russia (Svetlana Romashina & Svetlana Kolesnichenko) (both)
  - Team Technical/Free winners: Russia (both)
  - Mixed Duet Technical/Free winners: Russia (Kristina Averina & Mikhail Vasilev) (both)
  - Free Combination winners: Russia
  - Team Highlight winners: Spain
- June 19–23: 2019 European Junior "Artistic" Synchronized Swimming Championships in (Czech Republic) Prague
  - Solo Technical/Free winners: (Russia) Tatiana Gayday (both)
  - Duet Technical/Free winners: Russia (Kseniia Ladnaia & Elizaveta Minaeva) (both)
  - Team Technical/Free winners: Russia (both)
  - Mixed Duet Technical/Free winners: Russia (Kristina Averina & Mikhail Vasilev) (both)
  - Free Combination winners: Russia
  - Figures winner: (Belarus) Vasilina Khandoshka
- June 24–30: 2019 European Junior Diving Championships in Kazan
  - Level "A"
    - 1m Springboard: (Spain) Adrian Gio Abadia Garcia (m) / (Russia) Vitaliia Koroleva (f)
    - 3m Springboard: (Russia) Grigory Ivanov (m) / (Russia) Elizaveta Kuzina (f)
    - Platform: (Russia) Ruslan Ternovoi (m) / (Russia) Iana Satina (f)
  - Level "B"
    - 1m Springboard: (Germany) Carlos Taranu (m) / (United Kingdom) Desharne Bent-Ashmeil (f)
    - 3m Springboard: (Russia) Roman Larin (m) / (Germany) Lotti Hubert (f)
    - Platform: (Ukraine) Oleksii Sereda (m) / (Russia) Elizaveta Kanso (f)
  - Other
    - 3m Synchronized SB: Russia (Grigory Ivanov & Ruslan Ternovoi) (m) / Russia (Uliana Kliueva & Vitaliia Koroleva) (f)
    - 10m Synchronized PF: Russia (Emil Ibragimov & Ruslan Ternovoi) (m) / Great Britain (Emily Martin & Andrea Spendolini-Sirieix) (f)
    - Mixed Jump: Russia (Viktoriia Prosekova, Ruslan Ternovoi, Uliana Kliueva, & Grigory Ivanov)
- July 3–7: 2019 European Junior Swimming Championships in Kazan
  - Russia won both the gold and overall medal tallies.
- August 5–11: 2019 European Diving Championships in (Ukraine) Kyiv
  - Russia won both the gold and overall medal tallies.
- December 4–8: 2019 European Short Course Swimming Championships in (United Kingdom) Glasgow
  - Russia won both the gold and overall medal tallies.

=== 2019 FINA Marathon Swim World Series ===
- February 16: MSWS #1 in (Qatar) Doha
  - Winners: (Germany) Florian Wellbrock (m) / (Brazil) Ana Marcela Cunha (f)
- May 12: MSWS #2 in Seychelles
  - Winners: (France) Marc-Antoine Olivier (m) / (Italy) Arianna Bridi (f)
- June 8: MSWS #3 in (Portugal) Setúbal
  - Winners: (Japan) Yohsuke Miyamoto (m) / (Brazil) Ana Marcela Cunha (f)
- June 15: MSWS #4 in (Hungary) Balatonfüred
  - Men's 5 & 10 km winner: (Hungary) Kristóf Rasovszky
  - Women's 5 & 10 km winner: (Brazil) Ana Marcela Cunha
- July 21: MSWS #5 in (Canada) Lac Saint-Jean
  - Winners: (Hungary) Kristóf Rasovszky (m) / (Italy) Rachele Bruni (f)
- August 3: MSWS #6 in (Canada) Lake Mégantic
  - Winners: (Hungary) Kristóf Rasovszky (m) / (Italy) Rachele Bruni (f)
- August 28: MSWS #7 in (North Macedonia) Ohrid
  - Winners: (Russia) Kirill Abrosimov (m) / (Brazil) Ana Marcela Cunha (f)
- September 7: MSWS #8 in (Chinese Taipei) Nantou City
  - Winners: (Australia) Nicholas Sloman (m) / (Brazil) Ana Marcela Cunha (f)
- September 29: MSWS #9 (final) in (China) Chun'an County (Hangzhou)
  - Winners: (Netherlands) Ferry Weertman (m) / (Italy) Arianna Bridi (f)

=== 2019 FINA Ultra Marathon Swim Series ===
- February 3: UMSS #1 in (Argentina) Santa Fe
  - Winners: (Italy) Francesco Ghettini (m) / (Italy) Barbara Pozzobon (f)
- February 9: UMSS #2 in (Argentina) Rosario
  - Winners: (Argentina) Ivo Cassini (m) / (Argentina) Cecilia Biagioli (f)
- July 27: UMSS #3 in (Canada) Lac Saint-Jean
  - Winners: (Netherlands) Marcel Schouten (m) / (France) Morgane Dornic (f)
- August 24: UMSS #4 in (North Macedonia) Ohrid
  - Winners: (France) Axel Reymond (m) / (Italy) Alice Franco (f)
- August 31: UMSS #5 in (Croatia) Novi Vinodolski
  - Winners: (Italy) Edoardo Stochino (m) / (Germany) Angela Maurer (f)
- September 7: UMSS #6 (final) in (Italy) Capri-Naples
  - Winners: (Italy) Andrea Bianchi (m) / (Italy) Barbara Pozzobon (f)

=== 2019 FINA Diving World Series ===
- March 1 – 3: DWS #1 in (Japan) Sagamihara
  - 3m Springboard: (China) Xie Siyi (m) / (China) Shi Tingmao (f)
  - 10m Platform: (China) Yang Jian (m) / (China) Zhang Jiaqi (f)
  - 3m SB Synchronized: China (Cao Yuan & Xie Siyi) (m) / China (Shi Tingmao & Wang Han) (f)
  - 10m PF Synchronized: China (Cao Yuan & Chen Aisen) (m) / China (Zhang Jiaqi & LU Wei) (f)
  - Mixed Synchronized: China (CHANG Yani & Yang Hao) (3m) / China (Lian Junjie & Si Yajie) (10m)
- March 7 – 9: DWS #2 in Beijing
  - 3m Springboard: (China) Cao Yuan (m) / (China) Wang Han (f)
  - 10m Platform: (China) Yang Jian (m) / (China) Zhang Jiaqi (f)
  - 3m SB Synchronized: China (Cao Yuan & Xie Siyi) (m) / China (Wang Han & Shi Tingmao) (f)
  - 10m PF Synchronized: China (Chen Aisen & Cao Yuan) (m) / China (LU Wei & Zhang Jiaqi) (f)
  - Mixed Synchronized: China (Yang Hao & CHANG Yani) (3m) / China (Si Yajie & Lian Junjie) (10m)
- April 26 – 28: DWS #3 in (Canada) Montreal
  - 3m Springboard: (China) Xie Siyi (m) / (China) Wang Han (f)
  - 10m Platform: (United Kingdom) Tom Daley (m) / (China) LU Wei (f)
  - 3m SB Synchronized: China (Cao Yuan & Xie Siyi) (m) / China (Wang Han & Shi Tingmao) (f)
  - 10m PF Synchronized: China (Yang Hao & Lian Junjie) (m) / North Korea (JO Jin-mi & Kim Mi-rae) (f)
  - Mixed Synchronized: China (CHANG Yani & Yang Hao) (3m) / China (Lian Junjie & Si Yajie) (10m)
- May 10 – 12: DWS #4 in (Russia) Kazan
  - 3m Springboard: (United Kingdom) Jack Laugher (m) / (Canada) Jennifer Abel (f)
  - 10m Platform: (China) Yang Hao (m) / (North Korea) Kim Mi-rae (f)
  - 3m SB Synchronized: Ukraine (Oleh Kolodiy & Oleksandr Horshkovozov) (m) / China (LIN Shan & CHANG Yani) (f)
  - 10m PF Synchronized: China (Yang Hao & Lian Junjie) (m) / China (YUAN Haoyan & CHEN Yuxi) (f)
  - Mixed Synchronized: Australia (Domonic Bedggood & Maddison Keeney) (3m) / China (Duan Yu & Zhang Minjie) (10m)
- May 17 – 19: DWS #5 (final) in (United Kingdom) London
  - 3m Springboard: (United Kingdom) Jack Laugher (m) / (Australia) Maddison Keeney (f)
  - 10m Platform: (China) Yang Hao (m) / (China) CHEN Yuxi (f)
  - 3m SB Synchronized: China (WANG Zongyuan & WU Luxian) (m) / Australia (Maddison Keeney & Anabelle Smith) (f)
  - 10m PF Synchronized: Great Britain (Tom Daley & Matty Lee) (m) / China (Yuan Haoyan & Chen Yuxi) (f)
  - Mixed Synchronized: Great Britain (Grace Reid & Tom Daley) (3m) / China (Zhang Minjie & Duan Yu) (10m)

=== 2019 FINA Diving Grand Prix ===
- February 14 – 17: DGP #1 in Rostock
  - 3m Springboard: (Germany) Martin Wolfram (m) / (China) WEI Ying (f)
  - 10m Platform: (Russia) Viktor Minibaev (m) / (Canada) Celina Toth (f)
  - 3m SB Synchronized: Germany (Lars Rüdiger & Patrick Hausding) (m) / China (OUYANG Yu & HU Jiahan) (f)
  - 10m PF Synchronized: China (ZHANG Peng & ZHANG Wenao) (m) / Russia (Yulia Timoshinina & Ekaterina Beliaeva) (f)
  - Mixed Synchronized: Ukraine (Viktoriya Kesar & Stanislav Oliferchyk) (3m) / Germany (Christina Wassen & Florian Fandler) (10m)
- April 4 – 7: DGP #2 in Calgary
  - 3m Springboard: (China) HUANG Bowen (m) / (Canada) Jennifer Abel (f)
  - 10m Platform: (China) WANG Zewei (m) / (China) XU Yijin (f)
  - 3m SB Synchronized: Canada (Philippe Gagné & François Imbeau-Dulac) (m) / Canada (Mélissa Citrini-Beaulieu & Jennifer Abel) (f)
  - 10m PF Synchronized: Mexico (Randal Willars Valdez & José Balleza) (m) / Canada (Meaghan Benfeito & Caeli McKay) (f)
  - Mixed Synchronized: Canada (François Imbeau-Dulac & Jennifer Abel) (3m) / China (XU Yijin & WANG Zewei) (10m)
- April 11 – 14: DGP #3 in Mission Viejo
  - 3m Springboard: (United States) Briadam Herrera (m) / (United States) Hailey Herndandez (f)
  - 10m Platform: (Mexico) Randal Willars Valdez (m) / (Australia) Melissa Wu (f)
  - 3m SB Synchronized: Great Britain (Jordan Houlden & Anthony Harding) (m) / United States (Krysta Palmer & Alison Gibson) (f)
  - 10m PF Synchronized: Mexico (José Balleza & Randal Willars Valdez) (m) / Great Britain (Phoebe Banks & Emily Martin) (f)
  - Mixed Synchronized: Italy (Elena Bertocchi & Maicol Verzotto) (3m) / Mexico (José Balleza & María Sánchez) (10m)
- June 7 – 9: DGP #4 in (Spain) Madrid
  - 3m Springboard: (South Korea) Woo Ha-ram (m) / (China) WEI Ying (f)
  - 10m Platform: (China) YANG Ling (m) / (China) Zhang Minjie (f)
  - 3m SB Synchronized: South Korea (KIM Yeong-nam & Woo Ha-ram) (m) / China (Huang Xiaohui & WEI Ying) (f)
  - 10m PF Synchronized: China (YUAN Song & YANG Ling) (m) / South Korea (MOON Na-yun & CHO Eun-bi) (f)
- June 14 – 16: DGP #5 in Bolzano
  - 3m Springboard: (Colombia) Sebastián Morales (m) / (China) WEI Ying (f)
  - 10m Platform: (China) YUAN Song (m) / (China) Zhang Minjie (f)
  - 3m SB Synchronized: Colombia (Daniel Restrepo Garcia & Sebastián Morales) (m) / China (Huang Xiaohui & WEI Ying) (f)
  - 10m PF Synchronized: China (YUAN Song & YANG Ling) (m) / Italy (Noemi Batki & Chiara Pellacani) (f)
  - Mixed Synchronized: Australia (Alisa Kooi & Brodie Scapens) (3m) / Romania (Catalin Cozma & Antonia-Mihaela Pavel) (10m)
- June 21 – 24: DGP #6 in Cairo
  - 3m Springboard: (Egypt) Mohab Ishak (m) / (Egypt) Maha Eissa (f)
  - 10m Platform: (Puerto Rico) Rafael Quintero (m) / (Egypt) Maha Abdelsalam (f)
  - 3m SB Synchronized: Egypt (Ammar Hassan & Youssef Ezzat) (m) / Egypt (Habiba Shoeib & Maha Abdelsalam) (f; default)
  - Men's 10m PF Synchronized winners: Egypt (Youssef Ezzat & Mohamed Noaman)
- November 8 – 10: DGP #7 in (Australia) Gold Coast
  - 3m Springboard: (China) Wang Zongyuan (m) / (China) Chen Yiwen (f)
  - 10m Platform: (China) Lian Junjie (m) / (China) Si Yajie (f)
  - 3m SB Synchronized: Malaysia (Gabriel Gilbert Daim & Muhammad Syafiq Puteh) (m) / Malaysia (Jasmine Lai Pui Yee & Zhiayi Loh) (f; default)
  - Men's 10m PF Synchronized winners: Malaysia (Jellson Jabillin & Hanis Jaya Surya) (m) / China (SI Yajie & Ren Qian) (f; default)
  - Mixed Synchronized: Malaysia (Muhammad Syafiq Puteh & Nur Dhabitah Binti Sabri) (3m)
- November 15 – 17: DGP #8 in Kuala Lumpur
  - 3m Springboard: (Malaysia) Tze Liang Ooi (m) / (China) Huang Xiaohui (f)
  - 10m Platform: (China) YU Duan (m) / (China) Lin Shan (f)
  - 3m SB Synchronized: Malaysia (Chew Yiwei & Tze Liang Ooi) (m) / China (CHEN Yiwei & HUANG Xiaohui) (f)
  - Men's 10m PF Synchronized winners: China (WANG Zewei & DUAN Yu) (m) / China (TANG Yixuan & DU Yinying) (f)
  - Mixed Synchronized: Malaysia (Ng Yan Yee & Muhammad Syafiq Puteh) (3m) / Mexico (José Balleza & María Sánchez) (10m; default)
- November 22 – 24: DGP #9 (final) in Singapore
  - 3m Springboard: (China) Tai Xiaohu (m) / (China) XIAOHUI Huang (f)
  - 10m Platform: (China) YU Duan (m) / (China) TANG Yixuan (f)
  - 3m SB Synchronized: France (Gwendal Bisch & Alexis Jandard) (m) / China (HUANG Xiaohui & WEI Yiang) (f)
  - Men's 10m PF Synchronized winners: China (WANG Zewei & DUAN Yu) (m) / China (TANG Yixuan & DU Yinying) (f)
  - Mixed Synchronized: Switzerland (Jonathan Suckow & Michelle Heimberg) (3m) / Mexico (José Balleza & María Sánchez) (10m; default)

=== 2019 FINA Artistic Swimming World Series ===
- February 28 – March 3: ASWS #1 in Paris
  - Solo Technical/Free winners: (Japan) Yukiko Inui (both)
  - Duet Technical/Free winners: Ukraine (Marta Fiedina & Anastasiya Savchuk) / Ukraine (Maryna Aleksiiva & Vladyslava Aleksiiva)
  - Team Technical/Free winners: Ukraine / France
  - Mixed Duet Technical/Free winners: Japan (Yumi Adachi & Atsushi Abe) (both)
  - Free Combination winners: Brazil
  - Team Highlight winners: Spain
- April 4 – 7: ASWS #2 in (Greece) Alexandroupoli
  - Solo Technical/Free winners: (Canada) Jacqueline Simoneau / (Ukraine) Marta Fiedina
  - Duet Technical/Free winners: Ukraine (Marta Fiedina & Anastasiya Savchuk) / Ukraine (Maryna Aleksiiva & Vladyslava Aleksiiva)
  - Team Technical/Free winners: Ukraine / Canada
  - Mixed Duet Technical/Free winners: Japan (Yumi Adachi & Atsushi Abe) / Italy (Giorgio Minisini & Manila Flamini)
  - Free Combination winners: Israel
  - Team Highlight winners: Ukraine
- April 19 – 21: ASWS #3 in Kazan
  - Solo Technical/Free winners: (Russia) Svetlana Kolesnichenko / (Italy) Linda Cerruti
  - Duet Technical/Free winners: Russia (Svetlana Romashina & Svetlana Kolesnichenko) (both)
  - Team Technical/Free winners: Russia (both)
  - Mixed Duet Technical/Free winners: Russia (Mayya Gurbanberdieva & Aleksandr Maltsev) (both)
  - Free Combination winners: Russia
  - Team Highlight winners: Russia
- April 27 – 29: ASWS #4 in Tokyo
  - Solo Technical/Free winners: (Russia) Svetlana Kolesnichenko / (Japan) Yukiko Inui
  - Duet Technical/Free winners: Russia (Svetlana Romashina & Svetlana Kolesnichenko) (both)
  - Team Technical/Free winners: Japan (both)
  - Mixed Duet Technical/Free winners: Russia (Mayya Gurbanberdieva & Aleksandr Maltsev) (both)
  - Free Combination winners: Japan
  - Team Highlight winners: Japan
- May 4 – 6: ASWS #5 in Beijing
  - Solo Technical/Free winners: (Canada) Jacqueline Simoneau (both)
  - Duet Technical/Free winners: Canada (Claudia Holzner & Jacqueline Simoneau) (both)
  - Team Technical/Free winners: China / Canada
  - Mixed Duet Technical/Free winners: Russia (Mayya Gurbanberdieva & Aleksandr Maltsev) (both)
  - Free Combination winners: China
  - Team Highlight winners: Canada
- May 24 – 26: ASWS #6 in Greensboro
  - Solo Technical/Free winners: (Japan) Yukiko Inui (both)
  - Duet Technical/Free winners: Japan (Megumu Yoshida & Yukiko Inui) (both)
  - Team Technical/Free winners: Japan (both)
  - Mixed Duet Technical winners: United States (Bill May & Natalia Cristina Vega Figueroa)
  - Free Combination winners: Japan
  - Team Highlight winners: Hungary (default)
- May 30 – June 1: ASWS #7 in Quebec City
  - Solo Technical/Free winners: (Japan) Yukiko Inui (both)
  - Duet Technical/Free winners: China (Sun Wenyan & Huang Xuechen) (both)
  - Team Technical/Free winners: China (both)
  - Mixed Duet Technical winners: China (SHI Haoyu & ZHANG Yayi) / China (SHI Haoyu & CHENG Wentao) (default)
  - Free Combination winners: Canada
  - Team Highlight winners: Canada
- May 31 – June 2: ASWS #8 in (Spain) Barcelona
  - Solo Technical/Free winners: (Spain) Ona Carbonell / (Ukraine) Marta Fiedina
  - Duet Technical/Free winners: Ukraine (Marta Fiedina & Anastasiya Savchuk) (both)
  - Team Technical/Free winners: Russia (both)
  - Mixed Duet Technical winners: Russia (Mayya Gurbanberdieva & Aleksandr Maltsev) (both)
  - Free Combination winners: Ukraine
  - Team Highlight winners: Ukraine
- June 14 – 16: ASWS #9 (final) in (Hungary) Budapest
  - Solo Technical/Free winners: (Spain) Ona Carbonell / (Ukraine) Marta Fiedina
  - Duet Technical/Free winners: Ukraine (Marta Fiedina & Anastasiya Savchuk) (both)
  - Team Technical/Free winners: Ukraine (both)
  - Mixed Duet Technical/Free winners: Russia (Mayya Gurbanberdieva & Aleksandr Maltsev) (both)
  - Free Combination winners: Ukraine
  - Team Highlight winners: Ukraine

=== 2019 FINA Champions Swim Series ===
- April 27 & 28: CSS #1 in Guangzhou
  - China won both the gold and overall medal tallies.
- May 11 & 12: CSS #2 in (Hungary) Budapest
  - Russia won both the gold and overall medal tallies.
- May 31 & June 1: CSS #3 (final) in Indianapolis
  - United States won both the gold and overall medal tallies.

=== 2019 FINA Swimming World Cup ===
- August 2 – 4: SWC #1 in Tokyo
  - Australia won the gold medal tally. Japan won the overall medal tally.
- August 8 – 10: SWC #2 in Jinan
  - Australia won the gold medal tally. China won the overall medal tally.
- August 15 – 17: SWC #3 in Singapore
  - Australia won both the gold and overall medal tallies.
- October 4 – 6: SWC #4 in Budapest
  - Hungary won both the gold and overall medal tallies.
- October 11 – 13: SWC #4 in (Germany) Berlin
  - Hungary and the Netherlands won 5 gold medals each. Hungary won the overall medal tally.
- November 1 – 3: SWC #6 in Kazan
  - Russia won both the gold and overall medal tallies.
- November 7 – 9: SWC #7 (final) in (Qatar) Doha
  - Hungary won the gold medal tally. Australia won the overall medal tally.

=== 2019 International Swimming League ===
- October 5 & 6: ISL #1 in (United States) Indianapolis Winners: (Turkey) Energy Standard
- October 12 & 13: ISL #2 in (Italy) Naples Winners: (Turkey) Energy Standard
- October 19 & 20: ISL #3 in (United States) Lewisville Winners: (United Kingdom) London Roar
- October 26 & 27: ISL #4 in (Hungary) Budapest Winners: (United Kingdom) London Roar
- November 16 & 17: ISL #5 in (United States) College Park Winners: (United States) LA Current
- November 23 & 24: ISL #6 in (United Kingdom) London Winners: (Turkey) Energy Standard
- December 20 & 21: ISL Final Match in (United States) Las Vegas
  - (Turkey) Energy Standard won the inaugural ISL title, (United Kingdom) London Roar took second place. (United States) Cali Condors finished third.

=== 2019 Red Bull Cliff Diving World Series ===
- April 13: CDWS #1 in (Philippines) El Nido, Palawan
  - Winners: (United Kingdom) Gary Hunt (m) / (Australia) Rhiannan Iffland (w)
- May 12: CDWS #2 in (Republic of Ireland) Dublin
  - Winners: (Romania) Constantin Popovici (m) / (Australia) Rhiannan Iffland (w)
- June 2: CDWS #3 in (Italy) Polignano a Mare
  - Winners: (United Kingdom) Gary Hunt (m) / (Australia) Rhiannan Iffland (w)
- June 22: CDWS #4 in (Portugal) São Miguel, Azores
  - Winners: (United Kingdom) Gary Hunt (m) / (Australia) Rhiannan Iffland (w)
- July 14: CDWS #5 in (Lebanon) Beirut
  - Winners: (United Kingdom) Gary Hunt (m) / (Australia) Rhiannan Iffland (w)
- August 24: CDWS #6 in (Bosnia and Herzegovina) Mostar
  - Winners: (Romania) Constantin Popovici (m) / (Australia) Rhiannan Iffland (w)
- September 14: CDWS #7 (final) in (Spain) Bilbao
  - Winners: (United Kingdom) Gary Hunt (m) / (Australia) Rhiannan Iffland (w)

== Canoeing ==
=== 2020 Summer Olympics ===
- September 12 – 15: 2019 Canoe Sprint Olympic Test Event in (Japan) Tokyo at Sea Forest Waterway
  - Hungary and Belarus won 3 gold medals each. Hungary won the overall medal tally.
- October 23 – 27: 2019 Canoe Slalom Olympic Test Event in (Japan) Tokyo at the Canoe Slalom Course
  - C1 winners: (Switzerland) Thomas Koechlin (m) / (United Kingdom) Mallory Franklin (f)
  - K1 winners: (Germany) Hannes Aigner (m) / (Germany) Ricarda Funk (f)

=== International canoe championships ===
- October 24 – 27: 2019 ICF Stand Up Paddling World Championships in Qingdao
  - Japan won the gold medal tally. China won the overall medal tally.

=== Canoe sprint ===
==== International canoe sprint championships ====
- February 15 – 17: 2019 Oceania Canoe Sprint Championships in (New Zealand) Cambridge
  - For detailed results, click here.
- July 11 – 14: 2019 European Junior & U23 Canoe Sprint Championships in (Czech Republic) Račice
  - Belarus won the gold medal tally. Belarus and Russia won 15 overall medals each.
- August 1 – 4: 2019 ICF Junior & U23 Canoe Sprint World Championships in (Romania) Pitești
  - Hungary won both the gold and overall medal tallies.
- August 21 – 25: 2019 ICF Canoe Sprint World Championships in (Hungary) Szeged
  - Belarus and Germany won 6 gold medals each. Belarus won the overall medal tally.

==== 2019 Canoe Sprint World Cup ====
- May 23 – 26: CSWC #1 in Poznań
  - Ukraine won the gold medal tally. Poland won the overall medal tally.
- May 30 – June 2: CSWC #2 (final) in Duisburg
  - Germany won both the gold and overall medal tallies.

=== Canoe slalom ===
==== International canoe slalom championships ====
- February 22 – 24: 2019 Oceania Canoe Slalom Championships in Perth
  - C1 winners: (Germany) Franz Anton (m) / (Australia) Jessica Fox (f)
  - K1 winners: (United States) Michal Smolen (m) / (Germany) Ricarda Funk (f)
  - Mixed C2 winners: Australia (Warwick Draper & Sally Wright)
- May 30 – June 2: 2019 European Canoe Slalom Championships in Pau
  - C1 winners: (Slovenia) Benjamin Savšek (m) / (United Kingdom) Mallory Franklin (f)
  - K1 winners: (Czech Republic) Vít Přindiš (m) / (Czech Republic) Amálie Hilgertová (f)
  - Men's C1 Team winners: Slovenia (Benjamin Savšek, Luka Božič, & Anže Berčič)
  - Women's C1 Team winners: Great Britain (Mallory Franklin, Kimberley Woods, & Sophie Ogilvie)
  - Men's K1 Team winners: Czech Republic (Jiří Prskavec, Vít Přindiš, & Vavřinec Hradilek)
  - Women's K1 Team winners: France (Marie-Zélia Lafont, Lucie Baudu, & Camille Prigent)
- July 4 – 7: 2019 European Junior and U23 Canoe Slalom Championships in Liptovský Mikuláš
  - Junior C1 winners: (France) Yohann Senechault (m) / (Czech Republic) Gabriela Satková (f)
  - Junior K1 winners: (France) Anatole Delassus (m) / (Czech Republic) Kateřina Beková (f)
  - Junior Men's C1 Team winners: Slovakia (Ľudovít Macúš, Juraj Mráz, & Juraj Dieška)
  - Junior Women's C1 Team winners: Italy (Marta Bertoncelli, Elena Borghi, & Elena Micozzi)
  - Junior Men's K1 Team winners: Germany (Maximilian Dilli, Paul Bretzinger, & Tillmann Röller)
  - Junior Women's K1 Team winners: Czech Republic (Antonie Galušková, Lucie Nesnídalová, & Kateřina Beková)
  - U23 C1 winners: (France) Nicolas Gestin (m) / (France) Marjorie Delassus (f)
  - U23 K1 winners: (Slovakia) Jakub Grigar (m) / (Czech Republic) Tereza Fišerová (f)
  - U23 Men's C1 Team winners: Italy (Raffaello Ivaldi, Paolo Ceccon, & Flavio Micozzi)
  - U23 Women's C1 Team winners: France (Marjorie Delassus, Margaux Henry, & Ella Bregazzi)
  - U23 Men's K1 Team winners: France (Mathurin Madoré, Pol Oulhen, & Malo Quéméneur)
  - U23 Women's K1 Team winners: Czech Republic (Amálie Hilgertová, Tereza Fišerová, & Gabriela Satková)
- July 16 – 21: 2019 ICF Junior & U23 Canoe Slalom World Championships in (Poland) Kraków
  - Junior Canoe winners: (Slovenia) Nejc Polencic (m) / (Czech Republic) Gabriela Satková (f)
  - Junior Kayak winners: (France) Anatole Delassus (m) / (Czech Republic) Antonie Galušková (f)
  - Junior Team Canoe winners: France (Yohann Senechault & Adrien Fischer) (m) / Italy (Marta Bertoncelli & Elena Borghi) (f)
  - Junior Team Kayak winners: Great Britain (Jonny Dickson & Ben Haylett) (m) / France (Emma Vuitton & Doriane Delassus) (f)
  - Junior Mixed Canoe Double winners: Czech Republic (Tereza Kneblova & Martin Kratochvil)
  - Junior Extreme Canoe Slalom winners: (United Kingdom) Etienne Chappell (m) / (United States) Evy Leibfarth (f)
  - U23 Canoe winners: (France) Nicolas Gestin (m) / (Brazil) Ana Satila (f)
  - U23 Kayak winners: (France) Pol Oulhen (m) / (Czech Republic) Amálie Hilgertová (f)
  - U23 Team Canoe winners: Italy (Raffaello Ivaldi & Paolo Ceccon) (m) / Czech Republic (Tereza Fišerová & Eva Rihova) (f)
  - U23 Team Kayak winners: France (Mathurin Madoré & Malo Quéméneur) (m) / France (Camille Prigent & Romane Prigent) (f)
  - U23 Mixed Canoe Double winners: Czech Republic (Jana Matulkova & Vojtech Mruzek)
  - U23 Extreme Canoe Slalom winners: (Russia) Sergey Maimistov (m) / (Brazil) Ana Satila (f)
- September 6 – 8: 2019 Extreme Slalom World Championships in (Czech Republic) Prague
  - Winners: (Germany) Stefan Hengst (m) / (Czech Republic) Veronika Vojtová (f)
- September 24 – 29: 2019 ICF Canoe Slalom World Championships in La Seu d'Urgell
  - Canoe winners: (France) Cédric Joly (m) / (Germany) Andrea Herzog (f)
  - Kayak winners: (Czech Republic) Jiří Prskavec (m) / (Slovenia) Eva Terčelj (f)
  - Mixed Canoe Double winners: Czech Republic (Tereza Fišerová & Jakub Jáně)
  - Canoe Team winners: Slovakia (Alexander Slafkovský & Michal Martikán) (m) / Australia (Jessica Fox & Noemie Fox) (f)
  - Kayak Team winners: Spain (David Llorente & Samuel Hernanz) (m) / Great Britain (Mallory Franklin & Fiona Pennie) (f)
  - Forerunners Team winners: Spain (Pierre-Antoine Tillard & David Burgos)

==== 2019 Canoe Slalom World Cup ====
- June 14 – 16: #1 in (United Kingdom) Lee Valley White Water Centre
  - C1 winners: (Germany) Sideris Tasiadis (m) / (United Kingdom) Mallory Franklin (f)
  - K1 winners: (United Kingdom) Joe Clarke (m) / (United Kingdom) Mallory Franklin (f)
  - Extreme Canoe Slalom winners: (United Kingdom) Etienne Chappell (m) / (Russia) Alsu Minazova (f)
- June 21 – 23: #2 in (Slovakia) Bratislava
  - C1 winners: (Germany) Franz Anton (m) / (France) Claire Jacquet (f)
  - K1 winners: (Slovakia) Andrej Málek (m) / (Austria) Corinna Kuhnle (f)
  - Extreme Canoe Slalom winners: (Czech Republic) Vavřinec Hradilek (m) / (United States) Ashley Nee (f)
- June 28 – 30: #3 in (Slovenia) Tacen Whitewater Course
  - C1 winners: (Italy) Roberto Colazingari (m) / (Australia) Jessica Fox (f)
  - K1 winners: (Italy) Giovanni De Gennaro (m) / (Italy) Stefanie Horn (f)
  - Extreme Canoe Slalom winners: (Canada) Ben Hayward (m) / (Netherlands) Martina Wegman (f)
- August 30 – September 1: #4 in (Germany) Markkleeberg
  - C1 winners: (Slovakia) Alexander Slafkovský (m) / (Spain) Núria Vilarrubla (f)
  - K1 winners: (Czech Republic) Vít Přindiš (m) / (Germany) Ricarda Funk (f)
  - Extreme Canoe Slalom winners: (United Kingdom) Etienne Chappell (m) / (Germany) Caroline Trompeter (f)
- September 6 – 8: #5 (final) in (Czech Republic) Prague
  - C1 winners: (Slovakia) Matej Beňuš (m) / (Australia) Jessica Fox (f)
  - K1 winners: (Czech Republic) Jiří Prskavec (m) / (Australia) Jessica Fox (f)

==== Other international canoeing events ====
- July 2 – 7: 2019 ICF Canoe Freestyle World Championships in (Spain) Sort, Lleida
  - Kayak winners: (United States) Dane Jackson (m) / (Japan) Hitomi Takaku (f)
  - Squirt winners: (United States) Clay Wright (m) / (United States) Rose Wall (f)
  - Open Canoe winner: (United States) Jordan Poffenberger
  - Canoe Deck winner: (France) Tom Dolle
  - Junior Kayak winners: (United States) Mason Hargrove (m) / (United Kingdom) Ottilie Robinson-Shaw (f)
- July 23 – 28: 2019 ICF Junior & U23 Wildwater Canoeing World Championships in (Bosnia and Herzegovina) Banja Luka
  - For results, click here.
- August 21 – 24: 2019 ICF Paracanoe World Championships in (Hungary) Szeged
  - Great Britain and Ukraine won 3 gold medals each. Great Britain won the overall medal tally.
- September 9 – 15: 2019 ICF Canoe Ocean Racing World Championships in (France) Saint-Pierre-Quiberon
  - Surf Ski winners: (South Africa) Sean Rice (m) / (New Zealand) Danielle McKenzie (f)
  - Junior Surf Ski winners: (South Africa) Ulvard Hart (m) / (United States) Katriana Swetish (f)
  - U23 Surf Ski winners: (South Africa) Joshua Fenn (m) / (Australia) Jemma Smith (f)
- September 25 – 29: 2019 ICF Wildwater Canoeing World Championships in La Seu d'Urgell
  - Canoe winners: (France) Louis Lapointe (m) / (Czech Republic) Martina Satkova (f)
  - Kayak winners: (Slovenia) Nejc Znidarcic (m) / (France) Phenicia Dupras (f)
  - Canoe Doubles winners: France (Louis Lapointe & Tony Debray) (m) / France (Elsa Gaubert & Margot Beziat) (f)
  - Canoe Team winners: France (Louis Lapointe & Tony Debray) (m) / France (Elsa Gaubert & Helene Raguenes) (f)
  - Kayak Team winners: Slovenia (Nejc Znidarcic & Anze Urankar) (m) / Czech Republic (Anežka Paloudova & Martina Satkova) (f)
  - Men's Canoe Doubles Team winners: France
  - Forerunners winner: (Spain) Jordi Teixido
  - Forerunners Team winners: Spain (Andraz Echeverria Olguin & Joao Victor Machado Martins)
- October 17 – 20: 2019 ICF Canoe Marathon World Championships in (China) Shaoxing
  - Hungary won both the gold and overall medal tallies.

== Rowing ==
=== International rowing events ===
- January 26: 2019 European Rowing Indoor Championships in (Denmark) Copenhagen
  - For detailed results, click here.
- February 24: 2019 World Rowing Indoor Championships in (United States) Long Beach, California
  - For detailed results, click here.
- May 18 & 19: 2019 European Rowing Junior Championships in Essen
  - Germany won both the gold and overall medal tallies.
- May 31 – June 2: 2019 European Rowing Championships in (Switzerland) Lucerne
  - Germany won the gold medal tally. Germany, the Netherlands, and Italy won 7 overall medals each.
- July 24 – 28: 2019 World Rowing Under 23 Championships in (United States) Sarasota-Bradenton
  - Italy and Great Britain won 6 gold medals each. Italy won the overall medal tally.
- August 7 – 11: 2019 World Rowing Junior Championships in (Japan) Tokyo
  - Germany won both the gold and overall medal tallies.
- August 25 – September 1: 2019 World Rowing Championships in (Austria) Linz-Ottensheim
  - New Zealand won the gold medal tally. Italy and the Netherlands won 10 overall medals each.
- September 7 & 8: 2019 European Rowing Under 23 Championships in (Greece) Ioannina
  - Romania won both the gold and overall medal tallies.
- September 11 – 15: 2019 World Rowing Masters Regatta in (Hungary) Lake Velence
  - For September 11 results, click here.
  - For September 12 results, click here.
  - For September 13 results, click here.
  - For September 14 results, click here.
  - For September 15 results, click here.

=== 2019 World Rowing Cup ===
- May 10 – 12: #1 in (Bulgaria) Plovdiv
  - China and the Netherlands won 4 gold medals each. China won the overall medal tally.
- June 21 – 23: #2 in (Poland) Poznań
  - Australia and New Zealand won 4 gold medals each. Australia won the overall medal tally.
- July 12 – 14: #3 (final) in Rotterdam
  - Australia won the gold medal tally. Australia, the Netherlands, and Germany won 9 overall medals each.

== Sailing ==
=== International sailing events ===
- July 13 – 20: 2019 Youth Sailing World Championships in (Poland) Gdynia
  - 420 winners: New Zealand (Seb Menzies & Blake McGlashan) (m) / United States (Madeline Hawkins & Yumi Yoshiyasu) (f)
  - 29er winners: Norway (Mathias Berthet & Alexander Franks-Penty) (m) / United States (Berta Puig & Isabella (Bella) Casaretto) (f)
  - Nacra 15 winners: Australia (Will Cooley & Rebecca Hancock)
  - Laser Radial winners: (Turkey) Yigit Yalcin Citak (m) / (Italy) Chiara Benini Floriani (f)
  - RS:X winners: (France) Fabien Pianazza (m) / (Israel) Linoy Geva (f)
  - Nations Trophy winners: Spain
- August 6 – 10: 2019 Women's Match Racing World Championship in (Sweden) Lysekil
  - Winners: Great Britain (Lucy MacGregor, Amy Sparks, Bethan Carden, Mary Rook, & Kate MacGregor)

=== 2019 Sailing World Cup ===
- September 9 – 16, 2018: SWC #1 in Enoshima
  - 470 winners: Japan (Keiju Okada & Jumpei Hokazono) (m) / Netherlands (Afrodite Zegers & Anneloes van Veen) (f)
  - 49er(FX) winners: Great Britain (James Peters & Fynn Sterritt) (m) / Brazil (Martine Grael & Kahena Kunze) (f)
  - Laser(Radial) winners: (United Kingdom) Elliot Hanson (m) / (Netherlands) Marit Bouwmeester (f)
  - RS:X winners: (Netherlands) Kiran Badloe (m) / (China) Chen Peina (f)
  - Men's Finn winner: (Netherlands) Nicholas Heiner
  - Mixed Nacra 17 winners: Australia (Jason Waterhouse & Lisa Darmanin)
- January 27 – February 3: SWC #2 in (United States) Miami
  - 470 winners: Spain (Jordi Xammar & Nicolás Rodríguez García-Paz) (m) / Germany (Frederike Loewe & Anna Markfort) (f)
  - 49er(FX) winners: Germany (Erik Heil & Thomas Plößel) (m) / Brazil (Martine Grael & Kahena Kunze) (f)
  - Laser(Radial) winners: (Norway) Hermann Tomasgaard (m) / (China) ZHANG Dongshuang (f)
  - RS:X winners: (China) YE Bing (m) / (China) LU Yunxiu (f)
  - Men's Finn winner: (Sweden) Max Salminen
  - Mixed Nacra 17 winners: Australia (Jason Waterhouse & Lisa Darmanin)
- April 22 – 28: SWC #3 in (Italy) Genoa
  - 470 winners: New Zealand (Paul Snow-Hansen & Daniel Willcox) (m) / Brazil (Fernanda Oliveira & Ana Barbachan) (f)
  - 49er(FX) winners: Australia (David Gilmour & Lachy Gilmour) (m) / Netherlands (Odile van Aanholt & Marieke Jongens) (f)
  - Laser(Radial) winners: (Hungary) Jonatan Vadnai (m) / (Denmark) Anne-Marie Rindom (f)
  - Men's Finn winner: (Brazil) Jorge Zarif
  - Mixed Nacra 17 winners: Spain (Iker Martínez de Lizarduy & Olga Maslivets)
- June 2 – 9: SWC #4 (final) in Marseille
  - 470 winners: Australia (Mathew Belcher & Will Ryan) (m) / France (Camille Lecointre & Aloise Retornaz) (f)
  - 49er(FX) winners: Spain (Federico Alonso & Arturo Alonso) (m) / France (Julie Bossard & Aude Compan) (f)
  - Laser(Radial) winners: (Italy) Giovanni Coccoluto (m) / (Lithuania) Viktorija Andrulytė (f)
  - RS:X winners: (Italy) Mattia Camboni (m) / (Netherlands) Lilian de Geus (f)
  - Men's Finn winner: (New Zealand) Andy Maloney
  - Mixed Nacra 17 winners: Italy (Vittorio Bissaro & Maelle Frascari)
  - Kiteboarding Open winner: (France) Nicolas Parlier

=== 470 ===
- January 19 – 21: 2019 470 North American Championships in (United States) Coconut Grove Sailing Club (Miami)
  - Winners: Greece (Panagiotis Mantis & Pavlos Kagialis) (m) / France (Camille Lecointre & Aloise Retornaz) (f)
- March 14 – 17: 2019 470 South American Championships in Porto Alegre
  - Winners: Brazil (Ricardo Paranhos & Rodolfo Streibel) (m) / Brazil (Fernanda Oliveira & Ana Barbachan) (f)
- May 6 – 14: 2019 470 Open European Championships in (Italy) Sanremo
  - European winners: Sweden (Anton Dahlberg & Fredrik Bergström) (m) / France (Camille Lecointre & Aloise Retornaz) (f)
  - Men's Open winners: Australia (Mathew Belcher & Will Ryan)
- June 30 – July 7: 2019 470 Junior World Championships in (Slovenia) Portorož
  - Winners: Italy (Giacomo Ferrari & Giulio Calabro) (m) / Germany (Luise Wanser & Helena Wanser) (f)
- July 15 – 20: 2019 470 Masters Cup in Centro Vela Alto Lario
  - Apprentice winners: Switzerland (Michael Kyburz & Fabian Kuttel)
  - Masters winners: Italy
  - Grandmaster winners: Germany (Uti Thieme & Frank Thieme)
  - Grand Grandmaster winners: France (Pieter van Laer & Michel Lefevre)
- July 23 – 30: 2019 470 Junior European Championships in Vilagarcía de Arousa
  - Open winners: Spain (Conrad Konitzer & Fernando Rodríguez)
  - U17 winners: France (Ange Delerce & Timothee Rossi)
  - Women winners: Germany (Theres Dahnke & Birte Winkel)
  - Men's Mixed winners: Germany (Lucas Schlüter & Frederick Eichhorst)
- August 2 – 9: 2019 470 World Championships in (Japan) Enoshima
  - Winners: Australia (Mathew Belcher & Will Ryan) (m) / Great Britain (Hannah Mills & Eilidh McIntyre) (f)
- September 19 – 22: 2019 470 Eastern Europe Championship in (Lithuania) Elektrėnai
  - Winners: Poland (Zofia Korsak & Karolina Cendrowska)

=== 49er ===
- May 13 – 19: 2019 49er & 49er FX European Championship in (United Kingdom) Weymouth
  - 49er winners: New Zealand (Peter Burling & Blair Tuke)
  - 49er FX winners: Brazil (Martine Grael & Kahena Kunze)
- July 3 – 7: 2019 49er Junior World Championship in (Norway) Risør
  - 49er winners: New Zealand (Isaac McHardie & William McKenzie)
  - 49er FX winners: Italy (Alexandra Stalder & Silvia Speri)
- November 25 – 28: 2019 49er & 49er FX Oceania Championship in (New Zealand) Auckland
- November 29 – December 8: 2019 49er & 49er FX World Championships in (New Zealand) Auckland

=== Finn ===
- May 10 – 18: 2019 Finn European Championship in (Greece) Athens
  - Winner: (United Kingdom) Giles Scott
  - U23 winner: (Spain) Joan Cardona
- June 7 – 14: 2019 Finn World Masters in (Denmark) Skovshoved (Copenhagen)
  - Winner: (Russia) Vladimir Krutskikh
- July 14 – 20: 2019 Finn Silver Sup in (Italy) Anzio
  - Winner: (Finland) Oskari Muhonen
- September 11 – 15: 2019 Finn European Masters in (Germany) Schwerin
  - Winner: (Portugal) Filipe Silva
- December 13 – 21: 2019 Finn Gold Cup in (Australia) Melbourne

=== Laser ===
- July 2 – 9: 2019 Laser World Championship (Men's Standard) in (Japan) Sakaiminato
  - Winner: (Australia) Tom Burton
- July 17 – 24: 2019 Laser Radial World Championship for Men and Women in (Japan) Sakaiminato
  - Winners: (Belgium) Simon de Gendt (m) / (Denmark) Anne-Marie Rindom (f)
- July 24 – 31: 2019 Laser Radial Youth World Championships in (Canada) Kingston
  - Boys' Gold Fleet winner: (Turkey) Yigit Yalcin Citak
  - Boys' Silver Fleet winner: (United States) Nicholas Reeser
  - Boys' Bronze Fleet winner: (Canada) Nathan Latka
  - Girls' Fleet winner: (United Kingdom) Matilda Nicholls
- August 16 – 23: 2019 Laser 4.7 Youth World Championships in (Canada) Kingston
  - Boys' Gold Fleet winner: (Italy) Niccolo Nordera
  - Boys' Silver Fleet winner: (Norway) Nicklas Høst-Verbraak
  - Girls' Fleet winner: (Switzerland) Anja von Allmen
- September 5 – 14: 2019 Laser Masters World Championships in (Netherlands) Port Zélande
  - Apprentice winners: (New Zealand) Dave Ridley (Standard) / (United Kingdom) Jon Emmett (Radial)
  - GGM winners: (Germany) Wolfgang Gerz (Standard) / (Australia) Jeff Loosemore (Radial)
  - GM winners: (Spain) Carlos Martinez (Standard) / (France) Gilles Coadou (Radial)
  - Masters winners: (Netherlands) Serge Kats (Standard) / (New Zealand) Scott Leith (Radial)
  - Radial Legends winner: (Australia) Kerry Waraker
- October 26 – November 2: 2019 Laser Under-21 World Championships in (Croatia) Split
  - Winners: (Argentina) Juan Pablo Cardozo (m) / (Poland) Wiktoria Gołębiowska (f)

=== Nacra 17 ===
- March 15 – 19: 2019 Nacra 17 Asian Championship in Shanghai (Dianshan Lake)
  - Winners: China (SHI Junjie & ZHOU Qianaqian)
- May 13 – 19: 2019 Nacra 17 European Championship in (United Kingdom) Weymouth
  - Winners: Great Britain (Ben Saxton & Nicola Boniface)
- July 3 – 7: 2019 Nacra 17 Junior World Championship in (Norway) Risør
  - Winners: Italy (Gianluigi Ugolini & Maria Giubilei)
- November 25 – 28: 2019 Nacra 17 Oceania Championship in (New Zealand) Auckland
- November 29 – December 8: 2019 Nacra 17 World Championship in (New Zealand) Auckland

=== RS:X ===
- January 21 – 23: 2019 RS:X North American Championships in (United States) Miami
  - Winners: (France) Louis Giard (m) / (France) Helene Noesmoen (f)
- April 7 – 13: 2019 RS:X European & Youth European Championships and Open Trophy in (Spain) Palma de Mallorca
  - Senior winners: (Netherlands) Kiran Badloe (m) / (Netherlands) Lilian de Geus (f)
  - U21 winners: (Israel) Yoav Cohen (m) / (United Kingdom) Emma Wilson (f)
  - Youth (European) winners: (France) Fabien Pianazza (m) / (Israel) Naama Gazit (f)
  - U17 winners: (Israel) Daniel Basik Tashtash (m) / (France) Manon Pianazza (f)
- August 4 – 10: 2019 RS:X Windsurfing Youth World Championships in (Russia) Saint Petersburg
  - Youth Medal Race winners: (Israel) Eyal Yohay Zror (m) / (Russia) Yana Reznikova (f)
  - Youth Men's Gold winner: (Israel) Tomer Vardimon
  - Youth Men's Silver winner: (Netherlands) Matthijs van Wijngaarden
  - Youth Women's winner: (Russia) Dana Kosyak
- September 22 – 28: 2019 RS:X World Championship in (Italy) Torbole
  - Winners: (Netherlands) Kiran Badloe (m) / (China) LU Yunxiu (f)
  - U21 winners: (Israel) Tom Reuveny (m) / (Israel) Katy Spychakov (f)
- October 6 – 12: 2019 RS:X Windsurfing African Championships in (Algeria) Algiers
  - Winners: (Algeria) Hamza Bouras (m) / (Algeria) Amina Berrichi (f)

== Surfing ==
=== International Surfing Association ===
- May 26 – June 2: 2019 ISA World Longboard Surfing Championship in Biarritz
  - Open winners: (Peru) Benoit Clemente (m) / (France) Alice Lemoigne (f)
  - Team Points & ISA Aloha Cup winners: France
- September 7 – 15: 2019 ISA World Surfing Games in (Japan) Miyazaki
  - Open winners: (Brazil) Italo Ferreira (m) / (Peru) Sofía Mulánovich (f)
  - Team Points winners: Brazil
  - Aloha Cup winners: Australia
- October 26 – November 3: 2019 ISA World Junior Surfing Championship in Huntington Beach
  - U16 winners: (Hawaii) Jackson Bunch (m) / (Germany) Noah Lia Klapp (f)
  - U18 winners: (United States) Dimitri Poulos (m) / (Hawaii) Gabriela Bryan (f)
  - Aloha Cup and Team Points winners: United States
- November 23 – December 1: 2019 ISA World SUP and Paddleboard Championship in (El Salvador) El Sunzal
- TBA: 2019 ISA World Adaptive Surfing Championship (location TBA)

=== 2019 World Surf League ===
- Note 1: For the Men's 2019 schedule and detailed results, click here.
- Note 2: For the Women's 2019 schedule and detailed results, click here.
- April 3 – 13: Quiksilver Pro Gold Coast 2019 in (Australia) Gold Coast (M/W)
  - Winners: (Brazil) Italo Ferreira (m) / (United States) Caroline Marks (f)
- April 17 – 27: Rip Curl Pro Bells Beach 2019 in (Australia) Bells Beach (M/W)
  - Winners: (Hawaii) John John Florence (m) / (United States) Courtney Conlogue (f)
- May 13 – 25: Corona Bali Protected 2019 in (Indonesia) Bali (M/W)
  - Winners: (Japan) Kanoa Igarashi (m) / (Australia) Stephanie Gilmore (f)
- May 27 – June 9: Margaret River Pro 2019 in (Australia) Margaret River (M/W)
  - Winners: (Hawaii) John John Florence (m) / (United States) Lakey Peterson (f)
- June 20 – 23: Oi Rio Pro 2019 in (Brazil) Saquarema (M/W)
  - Winners: (Brazil) Filipe Toledo (m) / (Australia) Sally Fitzgibbons (f)
- July 9 – 22: Corona Open J-Bay 2019 in (South Africa) Jeffreys Bay (M/W)
  - Winners: (Brazil) Gabriel Medina (m) / (Hawaii) Carissa Moore (f)
- August 21 – September 1: Tahiti Pro Teahupo'o 2019 in (French Polynesia) Teahupo'o (Men only)
  - Winner: (Australia) Owen Wright
- September 19 – 21: Freshwater Pro 2019 in (United States) Lemoore (M/W)
  - Winners: (Brazil) Gabriel Medina (m) / (United States) Lakey Peterson (f)
- October 3 – 13: Quiksilver Pro France 2019 in Rion-des-Landes (M/W)
  - Winners: (France) Jérémy Florès (m) / (Hawaii) Carissa Moore (f)
- October 16 – 28: MEO Rip Curl Pro Portugal 2019 in Peniche (M/W)
  - Winners: (Brazil) Italo Ferreira (m) / (United States) Caroline Marks (f)
- November 25 – December 6: Hawaii Women's Pro 2019 in Hawaii (Women's Final)
- December 8 – 20: Billabong Pipe Masters 2019 in (Hawaii) Banzai Pipeline (Men's Final)

== Water polo ==
=== 2019 FINA Men's Water Polo World League ===
- October 23, 2018 – March 12, 2019: 2018–19 FINA Men's European Water Polo Preliminary Rounds
  - The following teams here have qualified to compete at the 2019 Men's Europa Cup Finals:
    - Hungary, Russia, Spain, Greece, Italy, Montenegro, Croatia, & Serbia
- March 26 – 31: 2019 FINA Men's Intercontinental Water Polo Tournament in Perth
  - Australia defeated Japan, 10–8, in the final. Canada took third place.
  - Note: Along with Kazakhstan, the three teams mentioned here have qualified to compete in the Superfinal.
- June 18 – 23: 2019 FINA Men's Water Polo World League Superfinal in Belgrade
  - Serbia defeated Croatia, 12–11, to win their 12th FINA Men's Water Polo World League title.
  - Australia took third place.
  - Note: Serbia has qualified to compete at the 2020 Summer Olympics.

=== 2019 FINA Women's Water Polo World League ===
- November 3, 2018 – March 5, 2019: 2018–19 FINA Women's European Water Polo Preliminary Rounds
  - The following teams here have qualified to compete at the 2019 Women's Europa Cup Finals:
    - Russia, Italy, Spain, Hungary, Greece, & the Netherlands.
- March 26 – 31: 2019 FINA Women's Intercontinental Water Polo Tournament in Perth
  - The United States defeated Australia, 14–12 in a shootout and after a 9–9 score in regular play, in the final.
  - China took third place.
- June 4 – 9: 2019 FINA Women's Water Polo League Superfinal in (Hungary) Budapest
  - The United States defeated Italy, 10–9, to win their sixth consecutive and 13th overall FINA Women's Water Polo League title.
  - Russia took third place.
  - Note: The United States has qualified to compete at the 2020 Summer Olympics.

=== International water polo events ===
- March 29 – 31: 2019 Women's Europa Cup Final in (Italy) Turin
  - The Netherlands defeated Russia, 11–9, in the final. Hungary took third place.
- April 5 – 7: 2019 Men's Europa Cup Final in Zagreb
  - Hungary defeated Croatia, 10–8, in the final. Spain took third place.
- September 9 – 15: 2019 FINA World Women's Junior Water Polo Championships in (Portugal) Funchal
  - Russia defeated Netherlands, 11–5, to win their second consecutive and third overall FINA World Women's Junior Water Polo Championships title.
  - Italy took third place.

=== Ligue Européenne de Natation (Water Polo) ===
National teams

- August 11 – 18: 2019 LEN European Junior Water Polo Championship in (Georgia (country)) Tbilisi
  - Italy defeated Spain, 10–6, to win their first LEN European Junior Water Polo Championship title.
  - Hungary took third place.
- September 1 – 8: 2019 European Women's Junior Water Polo Championship in (Greece) Volos
  - Spain defeated Russia, 12–11, to win their second consecutive European Women's Junior Water Polo Championship title.
  - Italy took third place.

Clubs

- September 28, 2018 – April 13, 2019: 2018–19 LEN Euro Cup
  - March 30 – April 13: 2018–19 LEN Euro Cup Finals
    - (France) CN Marseille defeated (Montenegro) Jadran Carine, 16–15 in 2 legs, to win their first LEN Euro Cup title.
- October 17, 2018 – May 15, 2019: 2018–19 LEN Champions League Preliminary Rounds
  - June 6 – 8: 2018–19 LEN Champions League Final Eight in (Germany) Hanover
    - (Hungary) FTC Telekom Budapest defeated (Greece) Olympiacos Piraeus, 14–13, to win their first LEN Champions League title.
    - (Italy) Pro Recco took third place.
- November 23, 2018 – April 20, 2019: 2018–19 LEN Euro League Women
  - (Spain) CN Sabadell defeated (Greece) Olympiacos, 13–11, to win their fifth LEN Euro League Women title.
  - (Greece) NC Vouliagmeni took third place.

=== UANA ===
- January 21 – 27: 2019 UANA Water Polo Cup in São Paulo
  - Men: In the final, Brazil defeated United States, 12–10. Canada took third place and Argentina took fourth place.
  - Women: In the final, Canada defeated Cuba, 18–9.

== Water skiing & Wakeboarding ==
=== IWWF World Championships ===
- February 14 – 23: 2018 IWWF World Cable Wakeboard & Wakeskate Championships in (Argentina) Buenos Aires
  - Wakeboard Open winners: (Israel) Lior Sofer (m) / (Germany) Julia Rick (f)
  - Seated Wakeboard Open winner: (Italy) Emanuele Pagnini
  - Wakestake Open winners: (France) Clement de Premonville (m) / (Slovakia) Zuzana Vrablova (f)
- July 4 – 7: 2019 IWWF World Under 21 Waterski Championship in (Canada) Shalom Park Water Ski Site (Edmonton)
  - Slalom winners: (United Kingdom) Joel Poland (m) / (Canada) Jaimee Bull (f)
  - Tricks winners: (Ukraine) Danylo Fil'Chenko (m) / (United States) Anna Gay (f)
  - Jump winners: (United Kingdom) Joel Poland (m) / (Chile) Valentina Gonzalez (f)
  - Overall winners: (United Kingdom) Joel Poland (m) / (United States) Anna Gay (f)
- July 22 – 28: 2019 IWWF World Disabled Championships in (Norway) Skarnes
  - For results, click here.
- August 12 – 18: 2019 IWWF Water Ski World Championships in (Malaysia) Putrajaya
  - Slalom winners: (Australia) Joel Howley (m) / (France) Manon Costard (f)
  - Tricks winners: (Mexico) Patricio Font (m) / (United States) Anna Gay (f)
  - Jump winners: (Canada) Ryan Dodd (m) / (Australia) Jacinta Carroll (f)
  - Overall winners: (Czech Republic) Martin Kolman (m) / (Canada) Whitney McClintock (f)
  - Team Classification winners: Canada
- September 7 – 15: 2019 IWWF World Waterski Racing Championships in (France) Vichy
  - Open winners: (Australia) Benjamin Gulley (m) / (Australia) Ellen Jones (f)
  - F2 winners: (Australia) Lachlin Nix (m) / (Belgium) Sylvia de Spiegeleire (f)
  - Junior winners: (Australia) Carter Robertson (m) / (Australia) Nellie McMillan (f)
- November 19 – 23: 2019 IWWF World Wakeboard Championships in (United Arab Emirates) Abu Dhabi

=== IWWF World Cup/Elite events ===
- March 6 – 11: 2019 Moomba Masters International Invitational Championships in (Australia) Melbourne
  - Senior
  - Overall winners: (Czech Republic) Martin Kolman (m) / (Germany) Giannina Bonnemann (f)
  - Jump winners: (United States) Freddy Krueger (m) / (Australia) Jacinta Carroll (f)
  - Slalom winners: (Italy) Thomas Degasperi (m) / (Canada) Whitney Mcclintock Rini (f)
  - Tricks winners: (Czech Republic) Martin Kolman (m) / (United States) Anna Gay (f)
  - Junior
  - U17 Overall winners: (Argentina) Tobias Giorgis (m) / (Australia) Sade Ferguson (f)
  - U17 Jump winners: (Argentina) Tobias Giorgis (m) / (Australia) Sade Ferguson (f)
  - U17 Slalom winners: (Colombia) Federico Jaramillo E. (m) / (Australia) Sade Ferguson (f)
  - U17 Tricks winners: (Mexico) Patricio Font (m) / (Canada) Neilly Ross (f)
- June 14 – 16: 2019 Bordeaux Slalom Cup in (France) Baurech
  - Pro Slalom winner: (Dominican Republic) Robert Pigozzi
  - Slalom winner: (United Kingdom) Frederick Winter
  - Amateur Slalom winner: (Switzerland) Pierre Cesinski
- June 22 & 23: 2019 Fungliss Pro Am in (France) Dommartin, Ain
  - Over 35 Slalom winners: (Switzerland) Thomas Cabri (m) / (Switzerland) Christine Fäh (f; default)
  - Open Slalom winners: (United Kingdom) Frederick Winter (m) / (New Zealand) Jaime Metcalfe (f)
- June 28 – 30: 2019 BOTASKI Pro Am in (Spain) Seseña
  - U17 Slalom winners: (Austria) Nikolaus Attensam (m) / (Austria) Marie Attensam (f; default)
  - U21 Slalom winners: (United Kingdom) Charlie Emmett (m) / (Switzerland) Emma Wolfisberg (f; default)
  - U35 Slalom winners: (Spain) Ivan Morros Peyri (m) / (Austria) Caroline Attensam (f; default)
  - Open Slalom winners: (Portugal) Francisco Rodrigues (m) / (Spain) Sandra Botas Medem (f)
  - Pro Men Slalom winner: (Canada) Stephen Neveu
- July 5 – 7: 2019 San Gervasio Pro Am in (Italy) San Gervasio Bresciano
  - Pro Slalom winners: (United Kingdom) Frederick Winter (m) / (France) Ambre Franc (f)
  - U45 Slalom winners: (Georgia (country)) Genadi Guralia (m) / (Italy) Claudia Fink (f; default)
  - U55 Slalom winners: (United States) Mike Parsons (m) / (United Kingdom) Hilary Winter (f)
  - Open Slalom winners: (Italy) Nicholas Benatti (m) / (Switzerland) Vivienne Frei (f)
- July 9 – 11: 2019 Malibu Open France in Lacanau
  - Pro Men's Slalom winner: (United Kingdom) William Asher
  - Amateur Open Slalom winner: (Switzerland) Vincent Stadlbaur
  - Amateur 10 – 21 Slalom winner: (United Kingdom) Charlie Emmett
  - Amateur 35 – 45 Slalom winner: (France) Raoul Gabriel
  - Amateur 55 – 65 Slalom winner: (France) Patrick Guyamier
- July 12 – 14: 2019 Andy Mapple Pro Am in (United Kingdom) Thorpe Lakes (Surrey)
  - Slalom winner: (United Kingdom) Charlie Emmett
  - Pro Men's Slalom winner: (United Kingdom) Frederick Winter
- July 18 – 20: 2019 IWWF Neom Wakeboard Cup in Saudi Arabia
  - Winners: (United Kingdom) Daniel Nott (m) / (United States) Dallas Friday (f)
- September 13 & 14: 2019 Malibu Open in (United States) Charleston
  - Slalom winners: (United Kingdom) William Asher (m) / (United States) Regina Jaquess (f)
  - Jump winners: (Russia) Igor Morozov (m) / (Australia) Jacinta Carroll (f)

=== Other IWWF Events ===
- March 2 & 3: 2019 Latrobe City – Oceania Waterski Championships in Lake Narracan (Gippsland)
  - Open winners: (Australia) Archie Davis (m) / (Australia) Sade Ferguson (f)
  - Over 35 winners: (New Zealand) John Connell (m) / (Australia) Cherie Buck (f)
  - Boys' U17 Tricks winner: (Malaysia) Aiden Yoong Hanifah
  - Girls' U17 Overall winner: (Malaysia) Aaliyah Yoong Hanifah (default)
  - Classification winners: Australia (Open) / Australia (Over 35)
- July 18 – 21: 2019 IWWF Europe & Africa Tournament Open Championships in (Spain) Toledo
  - Slalom winners: (Italy) Thomas Degasperi (m) / (France) Manon Costard (f)
  - Tricks winners: (Belarus) Aliaksei Zharnasek (m) / (Germany) Giannina Bonnemann (f)
  - Jump winners: (Russia) Igor Morozov (m) / (Greece) Marie Vympranietsova (f)
  - Overall winners: (France) Thibaut Dailland (m) / (Germany) Giannina Bonnemann (f)
  - Team winners: France
- July 25 – 28: 2019 IWWF Europe and Africa Tournament Over 35 Championships in (Greece) Ioannina
  - For results, click here.
- July 29 – August 4: 2019 IWWF Europe & Africa Tournament Under 21 Championships in (Ukraine) Dnipro
  - U21 Slalom winners: (Sweden) Jakob Bogne (m) / (France) Lea Miermont (f)
  - U21 Tricks winners: (Ukraine) Danylo Filchenko (m) / (Ukraine) Stanislava Prosvetova (f)
  - U21 Jump winners: (Ukraine) Danylo Filchenko (m) / (France) Marie-Lou Moulanier (f)
  - U21 Overall winners: (Ukraine) Danylo Filchenko (m) / (Ukraine) Stanislava Prosvetova (f)
- August 5 – 10: 2019 IWWF Europe and Africa Wakeboard Championships in (Ukraine) Kyiv
  - U14 winners: (Russia) Mikhail Doladov (m) / (Ukraine) Oleksandra Samoylenko (f)
  - Junior winners: (France) Maxime Roux (m) / (Russia) Anna-Maria Kushkovskaya (f)
  - Open winners: (Italy) Massimiliano Piffaretti (m) / (Netherlands) Sanne Meijer (f)
  - Over 30 winners: (France) Yann Calvez (m) / (United Kingdom) Emma Pickard (f)
  - Over 40 winners: (Italy) Francesco Starita (m) / (Italy) Annalisa di Corato (f)
  - Team Classification: Italy
- August 28 – September 1: 2019 IWWF Europe and Africa Tournament Youth Championships in (France) Roquebrune-sur-Argens
  - For results, click here.
- September 23 – 29: 2019 IWWF Asian Waterski & Wakesports Championships in (Thailand) Pratum Thani
  - Open Wakeboard winners: (South Korea) Yun Sang-hyun (m) / (South Korea) Shin Hyun-jeong (f)
  - Junior Wakeboard winners: (Japan) Yamato Kishida (m) / (Japan) Mio Nakagawa (f)
- October 2 – 6: 2019 IWWF Latin American Wakeboard & Wakeskate Championships in (Brazil) Mairiporã
  - Open winners: (Argentina) Kai Ditsch (m) / (Argentina) Eugenia de Armas (f)
- October 23 – 27: 2019 IWWF Pan American Senior Waterski Championships in (Peru) Bujama
  - For results, click here.

== See also ==
- 2019 in sports
