= Water skiing at the 2001 World Games – Men's barefoot three event =

Waterskiing men's barefoot three event at the 2001 World Games
- Venue: Ogata Water Ski Course, Ogata, Akita, Japan
- Date: 23–25 August 2001
- Competitors: 12 from 11 nations

Medalists
gold medal	(United States) Keith St. Onge
silver medal	(United Kingdom) David Small
bronze medal	(Netherlands) Evert Aartsen

The men's barefoot three event competition in water skiing at the 2001 World Games took place from 23 to 25 August 2001 at the Ogata Water Ski Course in Ogata, Akita, Japan.

== Competition format ==
A total of 12 athletes entered the competition. In this competition athletes compete in three events: slalom, tricks and jump. Best five athletes from preliminary round qualifies to the final.

== Results ==
=== Preliminary ===
Rank	Athlete	Nation	Slalom	Trick	Jump	Overall	Note
1	Keith St. Onge	United States	1,000.00	903.23	889.38	2,792.61	Q
2	David Small	(United Kingdom) Great Britain	748.15	1,000.00	915.93	2,664.08	Q
3	Patrick Wehner	France	651.85	830.65	929.20	2,411.70	Q
4	Evert Aartsen	Netherlands	814.81	625.81	942.48	2,383.10	Q
5	Terry Gregory	Germany	837.00	540.32	951.33	2,328.65	Q
6	Jan Baillien	Belgium	562.96	741.94	858.41	2,163.31	
7	Warren Fine	South Africa	511.11	669.35	920.35	2,100.81	
8	Evan Berger	Australia	718.52	362.90	946.90	2,028.32	
9	Massimiliano Colosio	Italy	718.52	201.61	1,000.00	1,920.13	
10	Bevan Kelly	New Zealand	385.19	225.81	1,000.00	1,611.00	
11	Fred Groen	New Zealand	496.30	274.19	761.06	1,531.55	
12	Don Baker	Canada	770.37	306.45	0.00	1,076.82	

=== Finals ===
Slalom

Rank	Athlete	Nation	Result
1	Keith St. Onge	United States	1,000.00
2	David Small	(United Kingdom) Great Britain	751.55
3	Evert Aartsen	Netherlands	726.71
4	Terry Gregory	Germany	701.86
5	Don Baker	Canada	658.39

Tricks

Rank	Athlete	Nation	Result
1	Keith St. Onge	United States	1,000.00
2	David Small	(United Kingdom) Great Britain	946.56
3	Patrick Wehner	France	816.79
4	Jan Baillien	Belgium	706.87
5	Warren Fine	South Africa	633.59

Jump

Rank	Athlete	Nation	Result
1	Terry Gregory	Germany	1,000.00
2	Bevan Kelly	New Zealand	953.59
3	Massimiliano Colosio	Italy	953.59
4	Evert Aartsen	Netherlands	940.93
5	Evan Berger	Australia	902.95

Overall

Rank	Athlete	Nation	Result
1st place, gold medalist(s)	Keith St. Onge	United States	2,848.10
2nd place, silver medalist(s)	David Small	(United Kingdom) Great Britain	2,571.53
3rd place, bronze medalist(s)	Evert Aartsen	Netherlands	2,260.01
4	Patrick Wehner	France	2,249.45
5	Terry Gregory	Germany	2,213.31
