= Yellow Shirts =

Yellow Shirts or yellow shirt may refer to:

- People's Alliance for Democracy or Yellow Shirts, a Thai movement protesting against Thaksin Shinawatra and his successors
- Yellow Shirts, the armed wing of the Black Hundreds, an ultra-nationalist movement in Russia in the early 20th century
- Yellow Shirts, members of the United States Waterskiing Team
- The yellow jersey worn by the current leader in some cycling races, including the Tour de France
- The yellow vests movement, a French populist grassroots political movement for economic justice
- Sportske novosti Yellow Shirt award, annual award for the best footballer in the Croatian league
