= George Atkins (American football) =

American football player and coach (1932–2015)

No. 62
- Position: Guard

Personal information
- Born: April 10, 1932; Birmingham, Alabama, U.S.
- Died: January 21, 2015 (aged 82); Birmingham, Alabama, U.S.
- Listed height: 6 ft 1 in (1.85 m)
- Listed weight: 210 lb (95 kg)

Career information
- High school: Irondale (AL) Shades Valley
- College: Auburn
- NFL draft: 1955: 15th round, 180th overall pick

Career history
- Detroit Lions (1955)

Career NFL statistics
- Games played: 12
- Games started: 6
- Fumble recoveries: 1
- Stats at Pro Football Reference

George Arthur Atkins (April 10, 1932 – January 21, 2015) was an American professional football offensive lineman. After a college football career at Auburn, he played one season with the Detroit Lions of the National Football League (NFL).

Atkins returned to Auburn as an assistant coach to Ralph Jordan in 1956, coaching in various positions, including offensive line. He resigned after the 1971 season to take on a business position in Birmingham, Alabama.

Atkins married former Leah Rawls, 1953 World water skiing champion and later historian at Auburn University, in 1954. He died in 2015.
