= Water skiing at the 2001 World Games – Men's three event =

Waterskiing men's three event at the 2001 World Games
- Venue: Ogata Water Ski Course, Ogata, Akita, Japan
- Date: 23–25 August 2001
- Competitors: 21 from 15 nations

Medalists
gold medal	(France) Patrice Martin
silver medal	(United Kingdom) Jason Seels
bronze medal	(United Kingdom) Tom Asher

The men's three event competition in water skiing at the 2001 World Games took place from 23 to 25 August 2001 at the Ogata Water Ski Course in Ogata, Akita, Japan.

== Competition format ==
A total of 21 athletes entered the competition. In this competition athletes compete in three events: slalom, tricks and jump. Best six athletes from preliminary round qualifies to the final.

== Results ==
=== Preliminary ===
Rank	Athlete	Nation	Slalom	Trick	Jump	Overall	Note
1	Jason Seels	(United Kingdom) Great Britain	959.68	978.31	1,000.00	2,937.99	Q
2	Patrice Martin	France	1,000.00	1,000.00	922.65	2,922.65	Q
3	Tom Asher	(United Kingdom) Great Britain	814.52	921.91	850.83	2,587.26	Q
4	George Hatzis	Greece	846.77	782.00	944.75	2,573.52	Q
5	Markham Smith	United States	830.65	573.75	941.99	2,346.39	Q
6	Rodrigo Miranda	Chile	774.19	726.68	828.73	2,329.60	Q
7	Christian Siegert	Colombia	806.45	663.77	839.78	2,310.00	
8	Jochen Luers	Germany	830.65	495.66	944.75	2,271.06	
9	Michael McCormick	United States	903.23	470.72	895.03	2,268.98	
10	Nick Böttcher	Germany	895.16	545.55	801.10	2,241.81	
11	Alessandro Giubbilei	Italy	701.61	750.54	707.18	2,159.33	
12	Dennis van Oye	Netherlands	701.61	746.20	660.22	2,108.03	
13	Hiroyuki Kurisawa	Japan	887.10	475.05	508.29	1,870.44	
14	Arturo Torres	Mexico	782.26	609.54	469.61	1,861.41	
15	Park Jae-hong	South Korea	814.52	184.38	748.62	1,747.52	
16	Son Je-min	South Korea	717.74	258.13	754.14	1,730.01	
17	Frederic Halt	Switzerland	798.39	393.71	527.62	1,719.72	
18	Andrej Tichy	Slovakia	806.45	459.87	331.49	1,597.81	
19	Yusuke Nozawa	Japan	677.42	334.06	497.24	1,508.72	
20	Saburo Tsuruki	Japan	612.90	293.93	508.29	1,415.12	
21	Warren Quinn	South Africa	653.23	393.71	0.00	1,046.94	

=== Final ===
Rank	Athlete	Nation	Slalom	Trick	Jump	Overall
1st place, gold medalist(s)	Patrice Martin	France	1,000.00	1,000.00	978.20	2,978.20
2nd place, silver medalist(s)	Jason Seels	(United Kingdom) Great Britain	881.89	862.36	991.83	2,736.08
3rd place, bronze medalist(s)	Tom Asher	(United Kingdom) Great Britain	913.39	943.69	877.38	2,734.46
4	George Hatzis	Greece	881.89	820.65	948.23	2,650.77
5	Markham Smith	United States	858.27	759.12	1,000.00	2,617.39
6	Rodrigo Miranda	Chile	881.89	716.37	831.06	2,429.32
