= Water skiing at the 1972 Summer Olympics =

Water Skiing at the Games of the XX Olympiad
- Venue: Kieler Förde, Kiel
- Dates: September 1–2, 1972
- Competitors: 35 from 20 nations

Water skiing was one of two demonstration sports at the 1972 Summer Olympics in Munich. It was the only time that the sport was demonstrated at any Olympic Games. 35 participants from 20 countries took part in six events: slalom, figure skiing, and ski jump for each of men and women skiers. The slalom events took place on September 1 and the figure skiing and ski jump events took place on September 2.

== Event results ==
=== Men's slalom ===
| Place | Name | Buoys |
|---|---|---|
| 1 | Roby Zucchi (ITA) | 44.0 |
| 2 | Wayne Grimditch (USA) | 38.5 |
| 3 | Jean–Michel Jamin (FRA) | 38.0 |
| 3 | Heikki Olamo (FIN) | 38.0 |
| 5 | Hans–Willi Eilermeier (FRG) | 32.0 |
| 6 | Karl–Heinz Benzinger (FRG) | 29.5 |
| 7 | Bruce Cockburn (AUS) | 28.5 |
| 8 | Graeme Cockburn (AUS) | 28.0 |
| 9 | Ricky McCormick (USA) | 27.5 |
| 9 | Kim Reid (CAN) | 27.5 |
| 9 | lan Walker (GBR) | 27.5 |
| 12 | Andres Botero (COL) | 21.0 |
| 13 | Pierre Clerc (SUI) | 17.5 |
| 14 | Pierre Plouffe (CAN) | 7.5 |
| 15 | Wolfgang Loscher (AUT) | 6.5 |

=== Men's Trick skiing ===
| Place | Name | Points |
|---|---|---|
| 1 | Ricky McCormick (USA) | 5340 |
| 2 | Wayne Grimditch (USA) | 4510 |
| 3 | Karl–Heinz Benzinger (FRG) | 4240 |
| 4 | Bruce Cockburn (AUS) | 3940 |
| 5 | Graeme Cockburn (AUS) | 3860 |
| 6 | Max Hofer (ITA) | 3850 |
| 7 | Edgardo Martin (ARG) | 3720 |
| 8 | lan Walker (GBR) | 3560 |
| 8 | Roby Zucchi (ITA) | 3560 |
| 10 | Jean Veys (BEL) | 2990 |
| 11 | Pierre Plouffe (CAN) | 2930 |
| 12 | Jean–Yves Parpette (FRA) | 2740 |
| 13 | Pierre Clerc (SUI) | 2640 |
| 14 | Paul Seaton (GBR) | 2160 |
| 15 | Heikki Olamo (FIN) | 2060 |
| 16 | Michel Finsterwald (SUI) | 1770 |

=== Men's jump ===
| Place | Name | Metres |
|---|---|---|
| 1 | Ricky McCormick (USA) | 43.75 |
| 2 | Max Hofer (ITA) | 37.70 |
| 2 | Hagen Klie (FRG) | 37.70 |
| 4 | Carlos Garcia (MEX) | 36.40 |
| 5 | Bruce Cockburn (AUS) | 35.50 |
| 6 | Pierre Clerc (SUI) | 35.40 |
| 7 | Roby Zucchi (ITA) | 35.10 |
| 8 | Jean–Yves Parpette (FRA) | 34.75 |
| 9 | Paul Seaton (GBR) | 34.40 |
| 10 | Pierre Plouffe (CAN) | 33.90 |
| 11 | Graeme Cockburn (AUS) | 33.10 |
| 12 | Kim Reid (CAN) | 31.90 |
| 13 | Alan Dagg (IRL) | 31.05 |
| 14 | Wayne Grimditch (USA) | 30.15 |

=== Women's slalom ===
| Place | Name | Buoys |
|---|---|---|
| 1 | Liz Allen–Shetter (USA) | 35.0 |
| 2 | Willy Stähle (NED) | 31.5 |
| 3 | Pat Messner (CAN) | 29.0 |
| 4 | Sylvie Maurial (FRA) | 28.0 |
| 5 | Kaye Thurlow (AUS) | 27.0 |

=== Women's figure skiing ===
| Place | Name | Points |
|---|---|---|
| 1 | Willy Stähle (NED) | 3140 |
| 2 | Kaye Thurlow (AUS) | 2750 |
| 3 | Sylvie Maurial (FRA) | 2560 |
| 4 | Sylvie Hülsemann (LUX) | 1780 |
| 5 | Liz Allen–Shetter (USA) | 1550 |

=== Women's jump ===
| Place | Name | Metres |
|---|---|---|
| 1 | Sylvie Maurial (FRA) | 27.40 |
| 2 | Kaye Thurlow (AUS) | 27.30 |
| 3 | Liz Allen–Shetter (USA) | 25.70 |
| 4 | Willy Stähle (NED) | 25.35 |
| 5 | Petra Trautmann (FRG) | 24.10 |
| 6 | Karen Morse (GBR) | 23.25 |
