= Water skiing at the 2009 World Games – Men's barefoot three event =

Waterskiing men's barefoot three event at the 2009 World Games
- Venue: Lotus Lake, Kaohsiung, Taiwan
- Date: 22–26 July 2009
- Competitors: 15 from 10 nations

Medalists
gold medal	(United States) Keith St. Onge
silver medal	(South Africa) Heinrich Sam
bronze medal	(United Kingdom) David Small

The men's barefoot three event competition in water skiing at the 2009 World Games took place from 22 to 26 July 2009 at the Lotus Lake in Kaohsiung, Taiwan.

== Competition format ==
A total of 15 athletes (one of them competed only in preliminaries of slalom and tricks) entered the competition. In this competition athletes compete in three events: slalom, tricks and jump. Best 11 athletes from preliminary round qualifies to the final.

== Results ==
=== Preliminary ===
Rank	Athlete	Nation	Slalom	Jump	Trick	Overall	Note
1	Keith St. Onge	United States	18.8	23.2m	8600	2865.67	Q
2	David Small	Great Britain	15.2	26.8m	7650	2698.04	Q
3	Heinrich Sam	South Africa	17.7	23.7m	7300	2674.66	Q
4	Peter O'Neill	Australia	13.2	23.4m	3400	1970.61	Q
5	Andre de Villiers	South Africa	11.5	25.5m	2500	1853.89	Q
6	Terry Gregory	Germany	13.6	22.0m	2330	1815.23	Q
7	Gordon Croteau	Canada	12.5	18.5m	1380	1515.66	Q
8	Mitch Groen	New Zealand	11.2	19.0m	1760	1509.35	Q
9	Christian Kurz	Germany	10.6	19.9m	1550	1486.60	Q
10	Darcy Arnel	Australia	9.7	21.3m	1500	1485.16	Q
11	Yang Xin	China	10.3	9.6m	1900	1127.01	Q
12	Michael MacDonald	Canada	10.4	0	4010	1019.47	
13	Giulio Stagi	Italy	9.0	0	1190	607.09	
14	Adin Daneker	United States	9.6	0	700	592.04	
	Chang Kuang-yu	Chinese Taipei	1.6	DNS	435		

=== Final ===
Rank	Athlete	Nation	Slalom	Jump	Trick	Overall
1st place, gold medalist(s)	Keith St. Onge	United States	18.8	23.3m	9350	2869.40
2nd place, silver medalist(s)	Heinrich Sam	South Africa	17.7	23.7m	8450	2729.56
3rd place, bronze medalist(s)	David Small	Great Britain	15.2	26.8m	7650	2626.69
4	Andre de Villiers	South Africa	15.2	25.5m	4850	2278.72
5	Peter O'Neill	Australia	14.9	23.4m	4230	2118.09
6	Terry Gregory	Germany	13.6	23.3m	3150	1929.70
7	Christian Kurz	Germany	10.6	22.3m	1550	1561.70
8	Mitch Groen	New Zealand	11.7	19.0m	1760	1519.54
9	Gordon Croteau	Canada	12.5	18.5m	1380	1502.78
10	Darcy Arnel	Australia	9.7	21.8m	1500	1489.82
11	Yang Xin	China	10.3	9.6m	1900	1109.29
