= Julia Gromyko =

Belarusian-German water skier (born 1971)

Personal information
- Born: 1971 (age 54–55) Minsk, Belarus

Sport
- Sport: Water skiing
Medal record
Representing Belarus
World Games
Bronze medal – third place	1993 The Hague	Tricks
World Championships
Gold medal – first place	1998 St. Leon-Rot	Overall
Bronze medal – third place	1998 St. Leon-Rot	Tricks
Gold medal – first place	2000 Piešťany	Overall
Gold medal – first place	2000 Piešťany	Tricks
Silver medal – second place	2000 Piešťany	Jump
Bronze medal – third place	2000 Piešťany	Slalom
Silver medal – second place	2002 Alfsee	Overall
Silver medal – second place	2002 Alfsee	Tricks
Silver medal – second place	2002 Alfsee	Jump
Gold medal – first place	2006 Schloß Dankern	Overall
Gold medal – first place	2006 Schloß Dankern	Tricks
Gold medal – first place	2006 Schloß Dankern	Jump
Bronze medal – third place	2008 Princes Club London	Overall
Silver medal – second place	2008 Princes Club London	Jump
Gold medal – first place	2008 Princes Club London	Slalom
Bronze medal – third place	2010 Tel Aviv	Overall
Gold medal – first place	2010 Tel Aviv	Tricks
Silver medal – second place	2010 Tel Aviv	Jump
Silver medal – second place	2012 Asten Ausee	Overall
Bronze medal – third place	2012 Asten Ausee	Jump
Bronze medal – third place	2012 Asten Ausee	Slalom

Julia Gromyko (Belarusian: Юлія Грамыка, born 1971, also known as Julia Meier-Gromyko) is a Belarusian-German water skier. As of 2004 she was the world record holder in the tricks and jump events.

Gromyko started waterskiing at age 9 and soon won several European junior titles. Since 1989 she dominated the cable skiing world championships. After marrying Marc-Andre Meier, a German slalom waterskier and world champion, she changed her last name to Meier-Gromyko. The couple lives in Germany and has two children. Gromyko is still competing at the world level through her forties, besides coaching the German team and being member of the World Cableski Council and EAME Cableski Council. In 2004, she was selected as the Cableski Athlete of the Year by the International Waterski & Wakeboard Federation.
