= Tito Antuñano =

Mexican water skier (1948–1987)

Adolfo "Tito" Antuñano Morán (September 27, 1948 in Guadalajara, Jalisco, Mexico – January 8, 1987 in León, Guanajuato, Mexico) was a former World Championship water skier.

In 1965 he won 2nd place in the Men's Tricks World Water Ski Union Championships at Surfer's Paradise Gardens in Australia. After two more years of practice at Lake Chapala, Jalisco he went on to win 1st place in Men's Slalom, 2nd place in Men's Tricks, and 2nd place in Men's Overall at the 1967 Water Ski Championship in Sherbrooke, Quebec, Canada.

His parents were Adolfo Antuñano Tovar and Luz Morán Díaz. His paternal grandfather was Joaquín Antuñano Villalobos a cofounder of organized Mexican rodeo, known as charrería, in Lagos de Moreno, Jalisco and his great-grandfather was José Antonio de Antuñano San Martín an immigrant from Viscaya, which is located in the Basque country of Spain.

== See also ==
- Waterskiing
- World water skiing champions
