= Pat Messner =

Patricia Marilyn Messner, CM (born 1954) is Canada's only Olympic medallist in water skiing.

Born in Hamilton, Ontario, she won the bronze medal in women's slalom at the 1972 Summer Olympics, though as it was a demonstration sport that year, which was not included in the medal table.

After the Olympics, she won 4 world championship medals, including the gold medal in women's slalom in 1979. She won 18 Canadian champion titles from 1965 to 1979.

In 1981, she was made a member of the Order of Canada. She is now in education.
