= Freddy Krueger (water skier) =

American water skier (born 1975)

Personal information
- Full name: Frederick August Krueger IV
- Nickname: The Nightmare
- Born: May 3, 1975 (age 51) Decatur, Illinois, U.S.
- Height: 5 ft 7 in (170 cm)
- Spouse: Karen Truelove

Sport
- Country: United States
- Sport: Waterskiing
- Event(s): Jump, Ski Fly

Freddy Krueger (born May 3, 1975) is professional water ski jumper. Krueger is a 8-time World Record Holder, 5-time World Champion, and 14-time Masters Champion. He currently holds the World Ski Flying record at 312 feet.

== Notable accomplishments ==
=== World records ===
	World Records			
226'	68.7 m	June 20, 1999	Austin Aquaplex	Austin, TX
233'	71.0 m	July 21, 2002	Bell Acqua	Sacramento, CA
236'	72.0 m	May 22, 2005	Sunset Lakes	Groveland, FL
238'	72.5 m	May 29, 2005	Robin Lake	Pine Mountain, GA
240'	73 m		Lake Grew	Polk City, FL
243'	74.2 m	November 5, 2006	McCormick's	Seffner, FL
247'	75.2 m	November 2, 2008	McCormick's	Seffner, FL
250'	76.2 m	May 1, 2014	Isles of Lee Hancock	Winter Garden, FL

=== Major titles ===
Major jump titles
World Championship Titles	2003, 2007, 2009, 2011, 2013
Pro Tour Titles	2001
Masters Titles	1999, 2000, 2001, 2005, 2006, 2007, 2008, 2009, 2010, 2011, 2013, 2016, 2018, 2021
Moomba Masters Titles	2004, 2005, 2007, 2013, 2014, 2015 2017 2019, 2020
U.S. Open Titles	1999, 2021

=== Masters ===
- 1999 Masters Jump Champion
- 2000 Masters Jump Champion
- 2001 Masters Jump Champion
- 2005 Masters Jump Champion
- 2006 Masters Jump Champion
- 2007 Masters Jump Champion
- 2008 Masters Jump Champion
- 2009 Masters Jump Champion
- 2010 Masters Jump Champion
- 2011 Masters Jump Champion
- 2013 Masters Jump Champion
- 2016 Masters Jump Champion
- 2018 Masters Jump Champion
- 2021 Masters Jump Champion

=== World championships ===
- 2001 World Jump Runner-up
- 2003 World Jump Champion
- 2007 World Jump Champion
- 2009 World Jump Champion
- 2011 World Jump Champion
- 2013 World Jump Champion

=== Nationals ===
- 2021 National Jump Champion
- 2020 National Jump Champion
- 2019 National Jump Champion
- 2018 National Jump Champion
- 2014 National Jump Champion
- 2013 National Jump Champion
- 2011 National Jump Champion
- 2010 National Jump Champion
- 2008 National Jump Champion
- 2001 National Jump Champion
- 2000 National Jump Champion
- 1995 National Jump Champion
- 1995 National Overall Champion
- 1994 National Trick Runner-up
- 1994 National Jump Runner-up
- 1994 National Overall Champion

=== Other tournaments ===
- 2010 Global Invitational – Men's Jumping Champion

== See also ==
- Waterskiing
- World water skiing champions
- Barefoot skiing
- USA Water Ski
- United States Waterskiing Team
