= Leah Rawls Atkins =

American historian and water skiing champion (1935–2024)

- Born: Leah Marie Rawls; April 24, 1935; Birmingham, Alabama, U.S.
- Died: October 4, 2024 (aged 89); Homewood, Alabama, U.S.
- Spouse: George Atkins (m. 1954; died 2015)

Leah Marie Rawls Atkins (April 24, 1935 – October 4, 2024) was an American historian and water skiing champion. She served as Director of the Auburn University Center for the Arts and Humanities.

== Career ==
Atkins won the 1953 World water skiing championships in Toronto. After a career in water skiing, she earned a Ph.D. in history from Auburn University in 1974.

Atkins was the first woman in the Alabama Sports Hall of Fame. The Leah Rawls Atkins Award, Auburn University’s highest award for athletics, is named in her honor.

== Personal life and death ==
In 1954, Atkins married American football player George Atkins.

Atkins died at an assisted living facility in Homewood, Alabama, on October 4, 2024, at the age of 89.

== Publications ==
Select books:

- A manual for writing Alabama State and local history, 1976
- The romantic ideal : Alabama's plantation eden, 1978
- The valley and the hills : an illustrated history of Birmingham & Jefferson County, 1981
- The Jones family of Huntsville Road, 1981
- An Alabama legacy : images of a state, 1994
- The building of Brasfield & Gorrie, 2002
- "Developed for the service of Alabama" : the centennial history of the Alabama Power Company, 1906-2006, 2006

== See also ==
- List of Auburn University people
