= Roby Zucchi =

Italian water skier (born 1951)

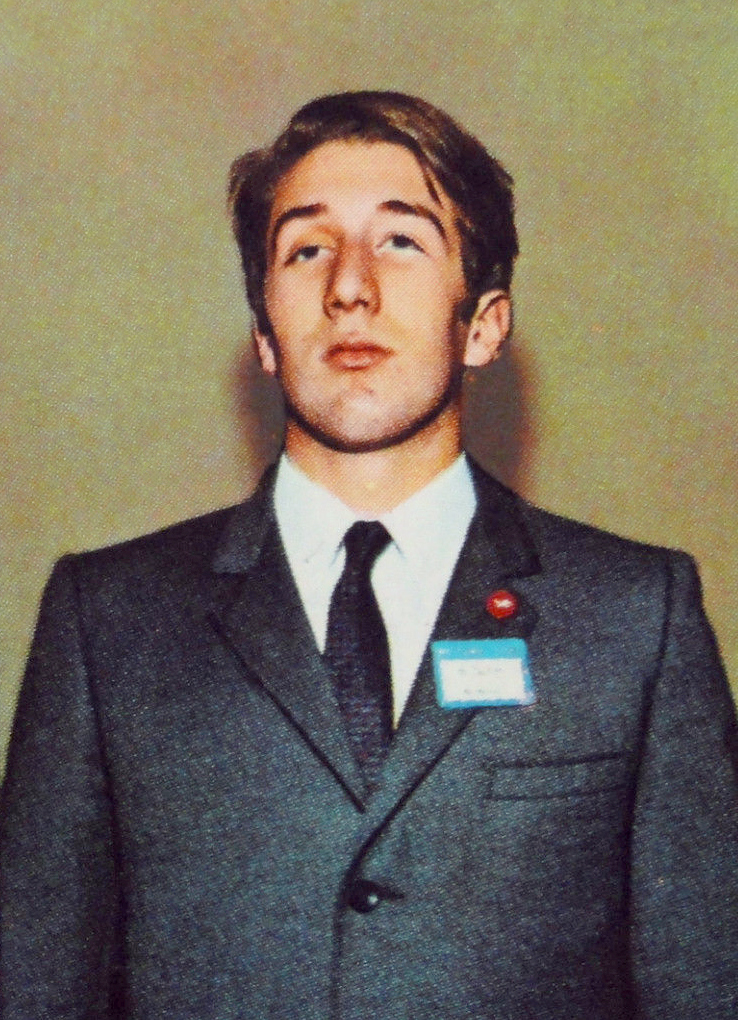
Roby Zucchi c. 1969

Roby Luigi Zucchi (born October 9, 1951, in Genoa, Italy) is an Italian former water-skier noted for slalom. He won a gold medal at the 1972 Olympics, where water skiing was an exhibition event. Later he won the slalom at the 1975 world championships. In 1995 he was inducted into the Water Skiing Hall of Fame.
