= Willy Stähle =

Dutch water skier

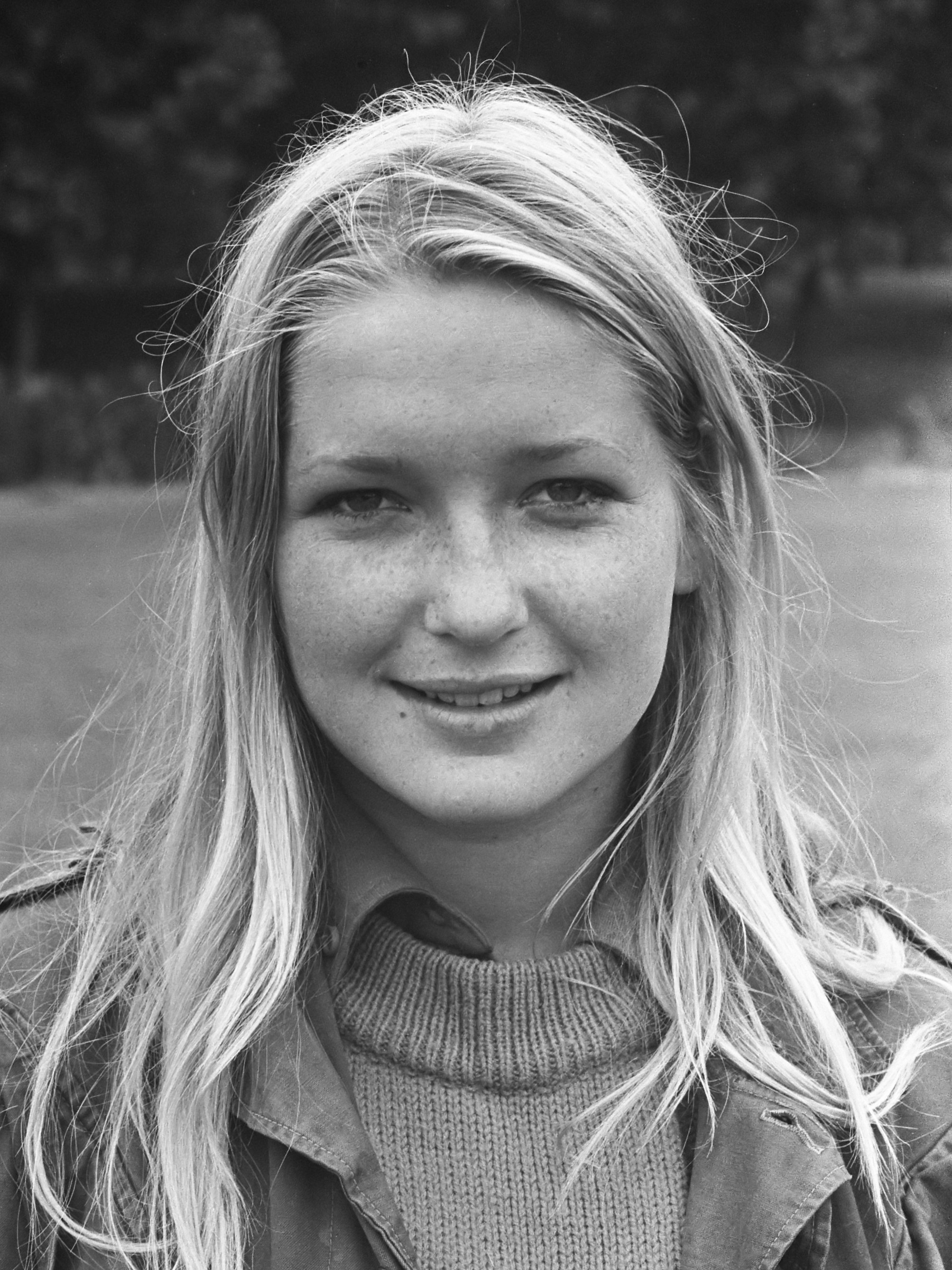
Stähle in July 1973.

Willy Juana Stähle (16 June 1954 – 27 August 2015) was a Dutch world water skiing champion.

As a young child, Stähle lived in Venezuela, where she learned water skiing from her father. Back in the Netherlands, the family lived in Bergen and she went to school in Alkmaar. In 1968 she won her first Dutch national championship water skiing. The next year, at the age of 15, she won her first European championship, and in 1971 her one world championship, in the trick discipline. For that achievement she became the Dutch Sportswoman of the Year in 1971.

Stähle won a gold and a silver medal at the 1972 Summer Olympics in Munich for women's figure skiing and slalom, respectively; however, Olympic water skiing was considered a demonstration sport at the time and her medals did not go toward the official count.

In 1975, after winning 26 European titles, Stähle retired from water skiing at the age of 21. She became a physiotherapist and a parachuting enthusiast. On 7 August 1983, she suffered a spinal cord injury in a parachute jump, leaving her paraplegic at the age of 29. In the late 1980s, she enrolled as an arts student at the Rietveld Academie. From the 2000s, she preferred to live in anonymity.

Stähle's death was announced on 1 September 2015. She's buried at the Zorgvlied cemetery in Amsterdam.
