= George Athans =

Canadian retired competitive water skier

George Athans CM (born 6 July 1952) is a Canadian retired competitive water skier. During his career he won 10 consecutive national titles from 1965 to 1974, the first at age 13. He has also broken 28 Canadian water skiing records. He is also in the Water Ski & Wakeboard Canada's Hall of Fame. Also known as George Athans Jr. to distinguish him from his father, Canadian Olympic Hall of Fame diver George Athans Sr.

Born in Kelowna, British Columbia, Athans was a member of the Canadian water ski team from 1966 to 1974 and participated in his first world championship in 1967. Athans won the world water ski championship in 1971 and 1973 and was named Canada's male amateur athlete of the year in both of those years. At his final national championship in 1974, his closest competitor was his brother, Greg Athans. A knee injury prevented Athans from competing for the Canadian title in 1975 and he retired from competition.

During his competitive career, Athans moved to Montreal to attend Sir George Williams University. He competed in the Canadian Superstars competition in 1978 (finishing fourth) and 1979 (second). Following his retirement, Athans worked as a commentator for CBC Sports and founded Athans Communications, a video production company based in Montreal.

Athans was made a Member of the Order of Canada in 1974 and has been inducted into the Canadian Olympic Hall of Fame (1971), Canada's Sports Hall of Fame (1974), the Quebec Sports Hall of Fame (1980), the International Water Ski Federation Hall of Fame (1993), and the Water Ski and Wakeboard Canada Hall of Fame (2004).
