= Steven Moore (water skier) =

British water skier

Steven Moore MBE is a former British World Water-Ski Racing world champion. He attained this title at the Australian World Championships in 1988.
