= Willa McGuire Cook =

Willa McGuire Cook (1928, Lake Oswego, Oregon – 21 April 2017, DeLand, Florida) was the winner of 18 American national titles in water skiing. She was the first freestyle water skier, and had a unique and creative approach to her sport. In the 1950s, Cook invented swivel skiing, a style of water skiing that became hugely successful around the world, which combines the moves of ballet with water skiing by using swivel bindings on the ski. Today a trophy in her name is awarded to the best female performer at the National Water Ski Show Tournament each year.

Cook developed a love for water skiing in her early teens. In 1945, she competed in her first National Water Ski Championships, winning first place titles in the slalom and tricks categories, as well as a first place title overall. She had never seen a jump or slaloms course until the day before the competition, making her victory all the more impressive. This first place title was the first of eight overall firsts for Willa in the National Championships, out of the nine National Championships she participated in. In 1948, she began a career performing at Cypress Gardens, a show that featured water skiers, and became a prima ballerina. She participated in world water skiing competitions in 1949, 1950, 1953, and 1955, and won the overall world title three times, along with five world event victories.

In 1959, Cook retired from competing, but has continued to water ski passionately. In 1989, she was an honoree of the International Water Ski Federation. She became a chairperson of the American Water Ski Hall of Fame museum, and used her creative talents to design their exhibits. McGuire also spent her career using her skills to teach others, and was always involved in teaching younger water skiers; many of her students became champion water skiers later on.
