= Jimmy Siemers =

American water skier

Personal information
- Born: March 24, 1982 (age 43); Marshalltown, Iowa

Sport
- Country: USA
- Sport: Waterskiing

Jimmy Siemers (born March 24, 1982) is a former professional 3-event water skier and 3-time World Record holder. Siemers skied for Arizona State University Water Ski Team, where he won the trick event at collegiate nationals four times in his four years on the team. He also set a Collegiate Record in the men's trick event in his last tournament as a student.

Siemers was inducted into the Water Ski Hall of Fame in 2023.

== Early life ==
Jimmy Siemers was born in Marshalltown, Iowa on March 24, 1982. He began water skiing at age four, and began competing at age of seven. He has also lived in Round Rock, Texas, and in currently resides just outside of San Marcos, Texas.

== College years ==
Jimmy Siemers attended Arizona State University, where he was a member of the ASU Water Ski Team. He majored in Communication, and graduated in 2006. During his time on the ASU Ski Team, he won the trick event each of his four years, and was an All-American trick, jump, and overall throughout his college career. He also set a former collegiate trick record in his last tournament as a college student.

== Pro career highlights ==
- 2005 U.S. Open Water Ski Championships - 2nd place
- 2005 Water Ski World Championships - Gold Medal, Men's Overall and Team Overall
- 2005 Water Ski National Championships - Open Men Jumping and Overall Champion
- 2005 MasterCraft Pro Water Ski Championships - Men's Tricks Champion
- 2005 Masters - 2nd place Men's tricks
- 2005 Collegiate All-Stars Water Ski Championships - Men's Tricks, Jumping and Overall Champion
- 2006 Masters - 1st place Men's tricks
- 2007 Men's Jump World Ranking= #13. Date: 00/10/22, Meters: 70.9 Location: Tri-Lakes Late Bloomer Zachary, La)
