= United States Waterskiing Team =

The United States Waterskiing Team competes internationally in water skiing tournaments and other events. Members of the team have informally been known as the Yellow Shirts. The team is known for its demanding training regimen and has been quite successful, particularly over the past ten years.

Recently, the team celebrated winning the Gold Cup.
