= Keith St. Onge =

American barefoot water skier

Personal information
- Born: Nashua, New Hampshire
- Height: 5 ft 10 in (178 cm)
- Weight: 170 lb (77 kg)

Sport
- Sport: Barefoot Water Skiing
- Club: World Barefoot Center
- Coached by: Gary "Swampy" Bouchard
Medal record
Gold medal – first place	2006 Barefoot World Championship	Overall
Gold medal – first place	2008 Barefoot World Championship	Overall

Keith St. Onge is a professional barefoot water skier. He holds the record for the most U.S. National Overall Pro titles at fourteen, a record previously held by Ron Scarpa. Keith is a two-time World Barefoot Champion, winning Overall titles in 2006 and 2008.

Keith learned to barefoot water ski on Lake Umbagog in New Hampshire at the age of nine with instruction from Mike Seipel, a two-time World Barefoot Champion. He entered his first barefoot tournament at age ten in the Eastern Region.

Keith co-founded the World Barefoot Center with four-time World Barefoot Champion, David Small.

== World records ==
Keith St. Onge is the only professional barefoot water skier to hold world records in all three events: Slalom; Jump and Tricks.

== Awards ==
- 1996 Banana George Blair Barefooter of the Year
- 2006 IWWF (International Waterski & Wakeboard Federation) Male Athlete of the Year
- 2009 IWWF (International Waterski & Wakeboard Federation) Male Athlete of the Year
