= Thomas Degasperi =

Italian professional water skier

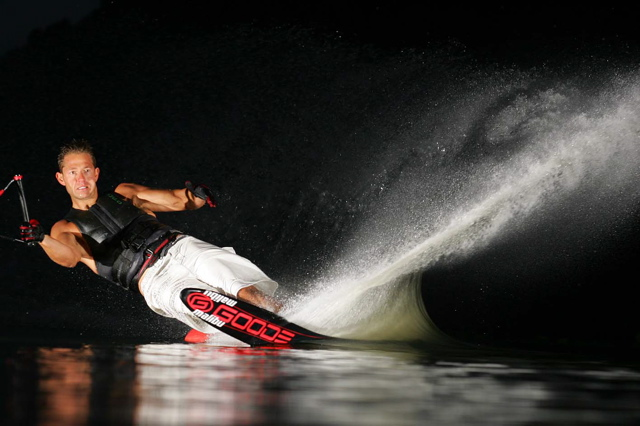

Personal information
- Nickname: TGAS
- National team: Italy
- Born: January 18, 1981 (age 45) Trento, Italy
- Height: 6 ft 4 in (193 cm)

Sport
- Sport: Waterskiing
- Event: Slalom

Thomas Degasperi (born 18 January 1981) is an Italian professional water skier. Born and raised in Trento, northern Italy he has been skiing since the young age of 5 years old. Under the wings of his father Marco, Thomas climbed the top of the world rankings and for over 2 decades has been recognized as one of the best waterskier ever lived, winning two World Championships, one Masters title, three Moomba masters titles, the Malibu open three times, the World Games, the European championships 12 times, the Canadian open, the Ski West Pro, the New Zealand Pro Am twice, the Atlanta Pro Am twice, the Mexico Pro Am, the Global Invitations pro, the Alizee cup, the San Gervasio Pro Am 2 times the Botas Pro Am and many more for a total of over 29 pro titles and over 120 pro podiums.

Thomas is also well known on the TV screen. In Italy he was a contestant on the popular reality TV show Dancing with the Stars. In the USA he had his own TV commercial on national television with his sponsor, 5 Hour Energy.

Thomas attended the University of Louisiana at Monroe as part of the Waterski team and he obtained his bachelor's degree in Marketing.

== Biography ==
Born in Trento, Italy, he started water-skiing at age five. He was encouraged by his father, Marco Degasperi, a well-known water-skiing coach and practiced at his father's ski school on Caldonazzo Lake in northern Italy. At 15 he won his first medal at the European Championships: gold in the slalom.

== Notable accomplishments ==
Major Titles
World Championship Titles	2007, 2011
Masters Titles	2014
Moomba Masters Titles	2014, 2017, 2019
World Games	2013

His major achievements are:

World Championships silver medals 2009, 2015, 2021

European Championships titles 2002, 2005, 2006, 2007, 2009, 2016, 2019, 2021, 2022, 2023, 2024 and 2025

Malibu Open titles 2006, 2016, 2023

Other titles includes: the Alizee Cup, the Global international pro, the Mexico pro am, 2 Atlanta pro wins, ski west pro champion, Canadian Open champion, 2 New Zealand Pro am titles, the San Gervasio Pro Am title in 2021 and 2025 the 2022 Botas Pro Am.

And a Staggering total of over 120 Pro Podiums
