= Patrice Martin (water skier) =

French water skier

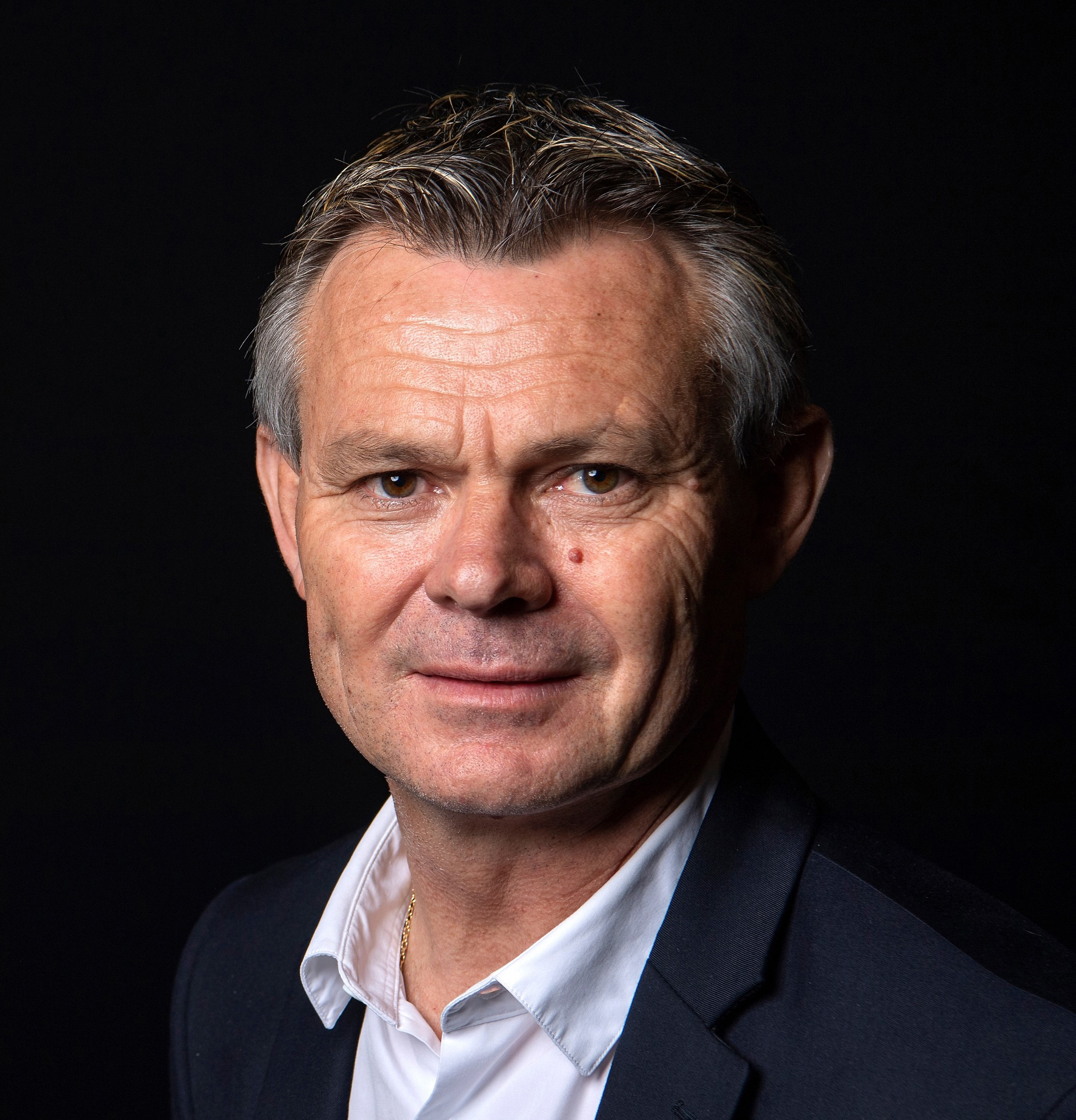
- Patrice Martin.

Personal information
- Born: 24 May 1964 (age 61); Nantes, France

Sport
- Country: France
- Sport: Watersking

Patrice Martin (born 24 May 1964 in Nantes, France) is a water skiing champion.

== Biography ==
He was European champion at the age of 14, and world champion at 15. He is 12 times world champion, and 34 times European champion.

He was elected at IWSF Hall of Fame in 2007.

== Achievements ==
- 12 times world champion
- 34 times European champion
- 8 times World Game gold medal
- 26 world records
