= European Water Skiing Championship =

Water Ski European Championships
- Status: Active
- Genre: Global sports event
- Frequency: Annual
- Inaugurated: 1947
- Organiser: International Waterski & Wakeboard Federation - IWWF Europe

List of Water Ski European Championships champions (Europe & Africa (E & A) Championship) (IWWF Europe - Africa Confederation).

== Types ==
- "Types of competition — Waterski Europe". echidna-banjo-th4s.squarespace.com.
- "Official Competition – IWWF Waterski Europe". Archived from the original on 2024-03-03.
- "Europe Titled Events (Championships) – IWWF Waterski Europe". Archived from the original on 2024-03-03.

IWWF Europe Confederation Waterski Championships annually:

1. Open (no age limitations) since 1947
2. Under 21 (U21) since 1990
3. Under 17 (U17 - Juniors) since 1964
4. Under 14 (U14) since 1964 or 1975 - U14 and U17 Championships are held together = E&A Youth Championships.
5. Over 35 (known as Seniors) (35+ / 45+ / 55+ / 65+ / 70+ / 75+ / 80+ / 85+
6. Adaptive Waterski Championships combined with the U-21 Championships every even year (ie. 2024, 2026, 2028, etc.).

== Results ==
| Year | Place | Slalom | Trick | Jump | Overall | Team |
|---|---|---|---|---|---|---|
| 1947 | Evian, France | M. Vuillety, France | Maggy M. Hearing, Switzerland | Claude DeClerq, Belgium | Claude DeClerq, Belgium | Not contested |
| 1947 | Evian, France | M Beday, Switzerland | Maggy Savard, France | Maggy Savard, France | Maggy Savard, France | Not contested |
| 1948 | Geneva, Switzerland | Jean-Pierre Mussat, France | Claude DeClerq, Belgium | Jean-Pierre Mussat, France | Jean-Pierre Mussat, France | Not contested |
| 1948 | Geneva, Switzerland | Monique Girod, Switzerland | Monique Girod, Switzerland | Monique Girod, Switzerland | Monique Girod, Switzerland | Not contested |
| 1949 | Juan-les-Pins, France | Christian Jourdain, France | P. Gouin, France | Claude DeClerq, Belgium | Claude DeClerq, Belgium & P. Gouin, France | Not contested |
| 1949 | Juan-les-Pins, France | Madeline Bouteiller, France | Madeline Bouteiller, France | N/A | Madeline Bouteiller, France | Not contested |
| 1950 | Evian, France | Claude DeClerq, Belgium | Claude DeClerq, Belgium | N/A | Claude DeClerq, Belgium | Not contested |
| 1950 | Evian, France | Jacqueline Marcour, Belgium | Monique Girod, Switzerland | N/A | Monique Girod, Switzerland | Not contested |
| 1951 | Genval, Belgium | Claude DeClerq, Belgium | Claude DeClerq, Belgium | Claude DeClerq, Belgium | Claude DeClerq, Belgium | Not contested |
| 1951 | Genval, Belgium | Monique Girod, Switzerland | Jacqueline Marcour, Belgium | Jacqueline Marcour, Belgium | Jacqueline Marcour, Belgium | Not contested |
| 1952 | Juan-Les-Pins, France | Claude DeClerq, Belgium | Claude DeClerq, Belgium | Claude DeClerq, Belgium | Claude DeClerq, Belgium | Not contested |
| 1952 | Juan-Les-Pins, France | J. Emy, Belgium | Jacqueline Marcour, Belgium | Jacqueline Marcour, Belgium | Jacqueline Marcour, Belgium | Not contested |
| 1953 | Pörtschach, Austria | L. Mosti, Italy | J-P Galtier, France | Mark Flachard, France | Guy Vermeersch Snr, Belgium | Not contested |
| 1953 | Pörtschach, Austria | L. Feuchtinger, Austria | Marina Ricolfi-Doria, Switzerland | Marina Ricolfi-Doria, Switzerland | Marina Ricolfi-Doria, Switzerland | Not contested |
| 1954 | Milan, Italy | Mark Flachard, France | Guy Vermeersch Snr, Belgium | Mark Flachard, France | Mark Flachard, France | Not contested |
| 1954 | Milan, Italy | L. Feuchtinger, Austria | Marina Ricolfi-Doria, Switzerland | C. Chevrot, France | Marina Ricolfi-Doria, Switzerland | Not contested |
| 1955 | Beirut, Lebanon | Simon Khoury, Lebanon | Simon Khoury, Lebanon | Mark Flachard, France | Simon Khoury, Lebanon | Not contested |
| 1955 | Beirut, Lebanon | Marina Ricolfi-Doria, Switzerland | Marina Ricolfi-Doria, Switzerland | Marina Ricolfi-Doria, Switzerland | Marina Ricolfi-Doria, Switzerland | Not contested |
| 1956 | Copenhagen, Denmark | Franco Carraro, Italy | Jean-Marie Muller, France | M. Kandelaft, France | Franco Carraro, Italy | Not contested |
| 1956 | Copenhagen, Denmark | Marina Ricolfi-Doria, Switzerland | Jacqueline Keller, France | Marina Ricolfi-Doria, Switzerland | Marina Ricolfi-Doria, Switzerland | Not contested |
| 1957 | Arenys de Mar, Spain | Simon Khoury, Lebanon | Jean-Marie Muller, France | Maxime Vazeille, France | Jean-Marie Muller, France | Not contested |
| 1957 | Arenys de Mar, Spain | Jacqueline Keller, France | Jacqueline Keller, France | Piera Castelvetri, Italy | Marina Ricolfi-Doria, Switzerland | Not contested |
| 1958 | Juan-Les-Pins, France | Jean-Marie Muller, France | Maxime Vazeille, France | Jean-Marie Muller, France | Jean-Marie Muller, France | France |
| 1958 | Juan-Les-Pins, France | Piera Castelvetri, Italy | Piera Castelvetri, Italy | Renate Hansluvka, Austria | Piera Castelvetri, Italy | France |
| 1959 | Milan, Italy | Jean-Marie Muller, France | Philippe Logut, France | Jean-Marie Muller, France | Bruno Zaccardi, Italy | Italy |
| 1959 | Milan, Italy | Piera Castelvetri, Italy | Piera Castelvetri, Italy | Renate Hansluvka, Austria | Piera Castelvetri, Italy | Italy |
| 1960 | Vienna, Austria | Bernd Rauchenwald, Austria | Jean-Marie Muller, France | Bruno Zaccardi, Italy | Bruno Zaccardi, Italy | Italy |
| 1960 | Vienna, Austria | Piera Castelvetri, Italy | Piera Castelvetri, Italy | Renate Hansluvka, Austria | Piera Castelvetri, Italy | Italy |
| 1961 | Banyoles, Spain | Franco Carraro, Italy | Jean-Marie Muller, France | Bruno Zaccardi, Italy | Bruno Zaccardi, Italy | France |
| 1961 | Banyoles, Spain | B. Martelly, France | Sylvie Hülsemann, Luxembourg | Sylvie Hülsemann, Luxembourg | Sylvie Hülsemann, Luxembourg | France |
| 1962 | Montreux, Switzerland | Bernd Rauchenwald, Austria | Jean Calmes, Luxembourg | Bruno Zaccardi, Italy | Maxime Vazeille, France | France |
| 1962 | Montreux, Switzerland | Renate Hansluvka, Austria | Dany Duflot, France | Dany Duflot, France | Renate Hansluvka, Austria | France |
| 1963 | Vichy, France | Bruno Zaccardi, Italy | Philippe Logut, France | Gerhard Rainer, Austria | Maxime Vazeille, France | France |
| 1963 | Vichy, France | Renate Hansluvka, Austria | Dany Duflot, France | Renate Hansluvka, Austria | Renate Hansluvka, Austria | France |
| 1964 | Castel Gandolfo, Italy | T. Bemocchi, Italy | T. Bemocchi, Italy | Gerhard Rainer, Austria | Mario Pozzini, Italy | Italy |
| 1964 | Castel Gandolfo, Italy | Jeanette Stewart-Wood, United Kingdom | Dany Duflot, France | Jeanette Stewart-Wood, United Kingdom | Dany Duflot, France | Italy |
| 1965 | Banyoles, Spain | T. Bemocchi, Italy | Jean-Jacques Zbinden, Switzerland | Jean-Jacques Potier, France | Jean-Jacques Potier, France | France |
| 1965 | Banyoles, Spain | Sylvie Hülsemann, Luxembourg | Alice Baumann, Switzerland | Renate Hansluvka, Austria | Renate Hansluvka, Austria | France |
| 1966 | Vereeniging, South Africa | Bruno Zaccardi, Italy | C. Raisin, France | Pierre Clerc, Switzerland | Bruno Zaccardi, Italy | France |
| 1966 | Vereeniging, South Africa | Jeanette Stewart-Wood, United Kingdom | Sylvie Hülsemann, Luxembourg | Jeanette Stewart-Wood, United Kingdom | Sylvie Hülsemann, Luxembourg | France |
| 1967 | Amsterdam, Netherlands | Jean-Jacques Zbinden, Switzerland | Jean-Jacques Zbinden, Switzerland | Pierre Clerc, Switzerland | Jean-Michel Jamin, France | France |
| 1967 | Amsterdam, Netherlands | Jeanette Stewart-Wood, United Kingdom | Dany Duflot, France | Jeanette Stewart-Wood, United Kingdom | Jeanette Stewart-Wood, United Kingdom | France |
| 1968 | Bedfont, United Kingdom | Roby Zucchi, Italy | J. Tillement, France | Pierre Clerc, Switzerland | Roby Zucchi, Italy | N/A |
| 1968 | Bedfont, United Kingdom | Sylvie Hülsemann, Luxembourg | Sylvie Hülsemann, Luxembourg | Jeanette Stewart-Wood, United Kingdom | Sylvie Hülsemann, Luxembourg | N/A |
| 1969 | Canzo, Italy | Jean-Michel Jamin, France | Roby Zucchi, Italy | Pierre Clerc, Switzerland | Jean-Michel Jamin, France | France |
| 1969 | Canzo, Italy | Eliane Borter, Switzerland | Eliane Borter, Switzerland | Eliane Borter, Switzerland | Eliane Borter, Switzerland | France |
| 1970 | Canzo, Italy | Roby Zucchi, Italy | Max Hofer, Italy | Ian Walker, United Kingdom | Roby Zucchi, Italy | France |
| 1970 | Canzo, Italy | Willy Stähle, Netherlands | Willy Stähle, Netherlands | Willy Stähle, Netherlands | Willy Stähle, Netherlands | France |
| 1971 | Canzo, Italy | Roby Zucchi, Italy | Karl-Heinz Benzinger, Germany | Roby Zucchi, Italy | Roby Zucchi, Italy | France |
| 1971 | Canzo, Italy | Sylvia Maurial, France | Sylvia Maurial, France | Willy Stähle, Netherlands | Sylvia Maurial, France | France |
| 1972 | Temple-sur-Lot, France | Roby Zucchi, Italy | Frantishek Stehno, Czech Republic | Paul Seaton, United Kingdom | Paul Seaton, United Kingdom | France |
| 1972 | Temple-sur-Lot, France | Willy Stähle, Netherlands | Willy Stähle, Netherlands | Willy Stähle, Netherlands | Willy Stähle, Netherlands | France |
| 1973 | Vilvoorde, Belgium | Lars Björk, Sweden | Frantishek Stehno, Czech Republic | Paul Seaton, United Kingdom | Lars Björk, Sweden | France |
| 1973 | Vilvoorde, Belgium | Eva-Marie Fritsch, Austria | Willy Stähle, Netherlands | Sylvia Maurial, France | Sylvia Maurial, France | France |
| 1974 | Hartebeespoort, South Africa | Max Hofer, Italy | Paul Seaton, United Kingdom | Paul Seaton, United Kingdom | Paul Seaton, United Kingdom | United Kingdom |
| 1974 | Hartebeespoort, South Africa | Chantal Amade-Escot, France | Eva-Marie Fritsch, Austria | Karen Morse, United Kingdom | Willy Stähle, Netherlands | United Kingdom |
| 1975 | Trier, Germany | Chantal Sommer, Germany | Frantishek Stehno, Czech Republic | Marco Merlo, Italy | Paul Seaton, United Kingdom | United Kingdom |
| 1975 | Trier, Germany | Willy Stähle, Netherlands | Willy Stähle, Netherlands | Petra Trautmann, Germany | Willy Stähle, Netherlands | United Kingdom |
| 1976 | Milan, Italy | Roby Zucchi, Italy | Frantishek Stehno, Czech Republic | Mike Hazelwood, United Kingdom | Mike Hazelwood, United Kingdom | United Kingdom |
| 1976 | Milan, Italy | Chantal Amade-Escot, France | Marlon Van Dijck, Netherlands | Karen Morse, United Kingdom | Chantal Amade-Escot, France | United Kingdom |
| 1977 | Annenheim, Austria | Eddy De Telder BEL | Mike Hazelwood, United Kingdom | Franz Oberleitner, Austria | Mike Hazelwood, United Kingdom | United Kingdom |
| 1977 | Annenheim, Austria | Silvia Terraciano, Italy | Chantal Amade-Escot, France | Karen Morse, United Kingdom | Chantal Amade-Escot, France | United Kingdom |
| 1978 | Temple-sur-Lot, France | Eddy De Telder, Belgium | Patrice Martin, France | Moshe Ganzi, Israel | Mike Hazelwood, United Kingdom | United Kingdom |
| 1978 | Temple-sur-Lot, France | Anita Carlman, Sweden | Inessa Potes, Soviet Union | Karen Morse, United Kingdom | Anita Carlman, Sweden | United Kingdom |
| 1979 | Castel Gandolfo, Italy | Roby Zucchi, Italy | Patrice Martin, France | Moshe Ganzi, Israel | Mike Hazelwood, United Kingdom | United Kingdom |
| 1979 | Castel Gandolfo, Italy | Karen Morse, United Kingdom | Natalya Rumyantseva, Soviet Union | Karen Morse, United Kingdom | Anita Carlman, Sweden | United Kingdom |
| 1980 | Kirtons Farm, United Kingdom | Mike Hazelwood, United Kingdom | Patrice Martin, France | Mike Hazelwood, United Kingdom | Mike Hazelwood, United Kingdom | United Kingdom |
| 1980 | Kirtons Farm, United Kingdom | Chantal Amade-Escot, France | Natalya Rumyantseva, Soviet Union | Marlon Van Dijck, Netherlands | Marlon Van Dijck, Netherlands | United Kingdom |
| 1981 | Belgrade, Yugoslavia | Michael Kjellander, Sweden | Patrice Martin, France | Mike Hazelwood, United Kingdom | Mike Hazelwood, United Kingdom | United Kingdom |
| 1981 | Belgrade, Yugoslavia | Marlon Van Dijck, Netherlands | Natalya Rumyantseva, Soviet Union | Karen Morse, United Kingdom | Anita Carlman, Sweden | United Kingdom |
| 1982 | Nottingham, United Kingdom | Andy Mapple, United Kingdom | Patrice Martin, France | Mike Hazelwood, United Kingdom | Mike Hazelwood, United Kingdom | United Kingdom |
| 1982 | Nottingham, United Kingdom | Helena Kjellander, Sweden | Natalya Rumyantseva, Soviet Union | Kathy Hulme, United Kingdom | Natalya Rumyantseva, Soviet Union | United Kingdom |
| 1983 | London, United Kingdom | Michael Kjellander, Sweden | John Battleday, United Kingdom | Mike Hazelwood, United Kingdom | Mike Hazelwood, United Kingdom | United Kingdom |
| 1983 | London, United Kingdom | Chantal Sommer, France | Marie-Pierre Seigneur, France | Karen Morse, United Kingdom | Anita Carlman, Sweden | United Kingdom |
| 1984 | Milan, Italy | Michael Kjellander, Sweden | Patrice Martin, France | Mike Hazelwood, United Kingdom | Patrice Martin, France | United Kingdom |
| 1984 | Milan, Italy | Helena Kjellander, Sweden | Natalya Rumyantseva, Soviet Union | Karen Morse, United Kingdom | Natalya Rumyantseva, Soviet Union | United Kingdom |
| 1985 | Stockholm, Sweden | Patrice Martin, France | Patrice Martin, France | Franz Oberleitner, Austria | Patrice Martin, France | United Kingdom |
| 1985 | Stockholm, Sweden | Helena Kjellander, Sweden | Natalya Rumyantseva, Soviet Union | Philippa Roberts, United Kingdom | Helena Kjellander, Sweden | United Kingdom |
| 1986 | Lincoln, United Kingdom | Mike Hazelwood, United Kingdom | Patrice Martin, France | Mike Hazelwood, United Kingdom | Mike Hazelwood, United Kingdom | United Kingdom |
| 1986 | Lincoln, United Kingdom | Karen Morse, United Kingdom | Marina Amelyanchyk, Soviet Union | Karen Morse, United Kingdom | Philippa Roberts, United Kingdom | United Kingdom |
| 1987 | Marignane, France | Pierre Carmin, France | Patrice Martin, France | Andrea Alessi, Italy | Andrea Alessi, Italy | Soviet Union |
| 1987 | Marignane, France | Karen Morse, United Kingdom | Marina Amelyanchyk, Soviet Union | Natalya Rumyantseva, Soviet Union | Natalya Rumyantseva, Soviet Union | Soviet Union |
| 1988 | Kirtons Farm, Reading, United Kingdom | Andy Mapple, United Kingdom | Andrea Alessi, Italy | Pierre Carmin, France | Andrea Alessi, Italy | United Kingdom |
| 1988 | Kirtons Farm, Reading, United Kingdom | Helena Kjellander, Sweden | Natalya Rumyantseva, Soviet Union | Karen Morse, United Kingdom | Helena Kjellander, Sweden | United Kingdom |
| 1989 | Milan, Italy | John Battleday, United Kingdom | Patrice Martin, France | Andrea Alessi, Italy | Andrea Alessi, Italy | Soviet Union |
| 1989 | Milan, Italy | Natalya Rumyantseva, Soviet Union | Natalya Rumyantseva, Soviet Union | Karen Morse, United Kingdom | Natalya Rumyantseva, Soviet Union | Soviet Union |
| 1990 | Toulouse, France | John Battleday, United Kingdom | Americ Benet, France | Andrea Alessi, Italy | Andrea Alessi, Italy | France |
| 1990 | Toulouse, France | Natalya Rumyantseva, Soviet Union | Marina Amelyanchyk, Soviet Union | Britta Llewellyn-Grebe, Austria | Philippa Roberts, United Kingdom | France |
| 1991 | Poti, Soviet Union | John Battleday, United Kingdom | Nikolas Leforestier, France | Andrea Alessi, Italy | Andrea Alessi, Italy | Soviet Union |
| 1991 | Poti, Soviet Union | Philippa Roberts, United Kingdom | Olga Pavlova, Soviet Union | Britta Llewellyn-Grebe, Austria | Olga Pavlova, Soviet Union | Soviet Union |
| 1992 | Milan, Italy | John Battleday, United Kingdom | Patrice Martin, France | Andrea Alessi, Italy | Patrice Martin, France | Belarus |
| 1992 | Milan, Italy | Helena Kjellander, Sweden | Natalia Rumiantseva, Russia | Britta Llewellyn-Grebe, Austria | Natalia Rumiantseva, Russia | Belarus |
| 1993 | Gmunden, Austria | Patrice Martin, France | Nikolas Leforestier, France | Andrea Alessi, Italy | Patrice Martin, France | Russia |
| 1993 | Gmunden, Austria | Natalia Rumiantseva, Russia | Olga Pavlova, Belarus | Britta Llewellyn-Grebe, Austria | Natalia Rumiantseva, Russia | Russia |
| 1994 | Ioannina, Greece | Patrice Martin, France | Patrice Martin, France | Andrea Alessi, Italy | Patrice Martin, France | France |
| 1994 | Ioannina, Greece | Philippa Roberts, United Kingdom | Natalia Rumiantseva, Russia | Britta Llewellyn-Grebe, Austria | Natalia Rumiantseva, Russia | France |
| 1995 | Bourg-en-Bresse, France / Switzerland | Fabrizio Ciapponi, Italy | Nikolas Leforestier, France | Steffen Wild, Germany | Andrea Alessi, Italy | Italy |
| 1995 | Bourg-en-Bresse, France / Switzerland | Irene Reinstaller, Italy | Natalia Rumiantseva, Russia | Britta Llewellyn-Grebe, Austria | Angeliki Andriopoulou, Greece | Italy |
| 1996 | Copenhagen, Denmark | Patrice Martin, France | Patrice Martin, France | Steffen Wild, Germany | Patrice Martin, France | France |
| 1996 | Copenhagen, Denmark | Irene Reinstaller, Italy | Natalia Rumiantseva, Russia | Britta Llewellyn-Grebe, Austria | Angeliki Andriopoulou, Greece | France |
| 1997 | Olympia, Greece | Patrice Martin, France | Nikolas Leforestier, France | Steffen Wild, Germany | Patrice Martin, France | France |
| 1997 | Olympia, Greece | Irene Reinstaller, Italy | Natalia Rumiantseva, Russia | Elena Milakova, Russia | Olga Pavlova, Belarus | France |
| 1998 | Linz, Austria | Dmitri Gamzukoff, France | Oleg Deviatovski, Belarus | Andrea Alessi, Italy | Oleg Deviatovski, Belarus | France |
| 1998 | Linz, Austria | Irene Reinstaller, Italy | Marina Basinskaya-Amelyanchyk, Belarus | Britta Llewellyn-Grebe, Austria | Angeliki Andriopoulou, Greece | France |
| 1999 | Bourg-en-Bresse, France | Patrice Martin, France | Patrice Martin, France | Jason Seels, United Kingdom | Patrice Martin, France | France |
| 1999 | Bourg-en-Bresse, France | Christina Muggiasca, Switzerland | Angeliki Andriopoulou, Greece | Britta Llewellyn-Grebe, Austria | Angeliki Andriopoulou, Greece | France |
| 2000 | Moscow, Russia | Glen Campbell, United Kingdom | Nikolas Leforestier, France | Christopher Duverger, France | Oleg Deviatovski, Belarus | Belarus |
| 2000 | Moscow, Russia | Geraldine Jamin, France | Frederique Savin, France | Britta Llewellyn-Grebe, Austria | Anais Amade, France | Belarus |
| 2001 | Lincoln, United Kingdom | Jody Fisher, United Kingdom | Patrice Martin, France | Jason Seels, United Kingdom | Patrice Martin, France | United Kingdom |
| 2001 | Lincoln, United Kingdom | Irene Reinstaller, Italy | Elena Milakova, Russia | Elena Milakova, Russia | Elena Milakova, Russia | United Kingdom |
| 2002 | Roquebrune, France | Thomas Degasperi, Italy | Oleg Deviatovski, Belarus | Jochen Luers, Germany | Oleg Deviatovski, Belarus | France |
| 2002 | Roquebrune, France | Christina Muggiasca, Switzerland | Elena Milakova, Russia | Elena Milakova, Russia | Angeliki Andriopoulou, Greece | France |
| 2003 | Agrinio, Greece | William Asher, United Kingdom | Nikolas Leforestier, France | Jasper Cassoe, Denmark | Jason Seels, United Kingdom | France |
| 2003 | Agrinio, Greece | Sarah Gatty-Saunt, United Kingdom | Clementine Lucine, France | June Fladborg, Denmark | Marina Mosti, Italy | France |
| 2004 | Recetto, Italy | Fabio Ianni, Italy | Nikolas Leforestier, France | Jason Seels, United Kingdom | Jason Seels, United Kingdom | France |
| 2004 | Recetto, Italy | Anais Amade, France | Clementine Lucine, France | June Fladborg, Denmark | Clementine Lucine, France | France |
| 2005 | Linz, Austria | Thomas Degasperi, Italy | Nikolas Leforestier, France | Jason Seels, United Kingdom | Aliaksei Zharnasek, Belarus | France |
| 2005 | Linz, Austria | Geraldine Jamin, France | Clementine Lucine, France | Angeliki Andriopoulou, Greece | Clementine Lucine, France | France |
| 2006 | Athen, Greece | Thomas Degasperi, Italy | Nikolas Leforestier, France | Cristian Rampanelli, Italy | Oleg Deviatovski, Belarus | France |
| 2006 | Athen, Greece | Geraldine Jamin, France | Marion Aynaud, France | Angeliki Andriopoulou, Greece | Clementine Lucine, France | France |
| 2007 | Recetto, Italy | Thomas Degasperi, Italy | Nikolas Leforestier, France | Jason Seels, United Kingdom | Marco Riva, Italy | France |
| 2007 | Recetto, Italy | Anais Amade, France | Clementine Lucine, France | June Fladborg, Denmark | Clementine Lucine, France | France |
| 2008 | Fagersta, Sweden | Will Asher, United Kingdom | Aliaksei Zharnasek, Belarus | Jason Seels, United Kingdom | Jason Seels, United Kingdom | Belarus |
| 2008 | Fagersta, Sweden | Sarah Green, United Kingdom | Natallia Berdnikava, Belarus | Natallia Berdnikava, Belarus | Natallia Berdnikava, Belarus | Belarus |
| 2009 | Vallensbæk, Copenhagen, Denmark | Thomas Degasperi, Italy | Herman Beliakou, Belarus | Damien Sharman, United Kingdom | Adam Sedlmajer, Czech Republic | France |
| 2009 | Vallensbæk, Copenhagen, Denmark | Anais Amade, France | Natallia Berdnikava, Belarus | Maj Lund Jepsen, Denmark | Clementine Lucine, France | France |
| 2010 | Thorpe, London, United Kingdom | Will Asher, United Kingdom | Nikolas Leforestier, France | Jason Seels, United Kingdom | Jason Seels, United Kingdom | France |
| 2010 | Thorpe, London, United Kingdom | Clementine Lucine, France | Marion Aynaud, France | June Fladborg, Denmark | Natallia Berdnikava, Belarus | France |
| 2011 | Skarnes, Norway | Adam Sedlmajer, Czech Republic | Aliaksei Zharnasek, Belarus | Stephen Critchley, United Kingdom | Adam Sedlmajer, Czech Republic | Belarus |
| 2011 | Skarnes, Norway | Marion Mathieu, France | Clementine Lucine, France | Natallia Berdnikava, Belarus | Natallia Berdnikava, Belarus | Belarus |
| 2012 | Recetto, Italy | Will Asher, United Kingdom | Poteau Alexandre, France | Efverström Daniel, Sweden | Adam Sedlmajer, Czech Republic | France |
| 2012 | Recetto, Italy | Claire Lise Welter, France | Clementine Lucine, France | Marion Mathieu, France | Clementine Lucine, France | France |
| 2013 | Ioanina, Greece | Daniel Odvarko, Czech Republic | Pierre Ballon, France | Bojan Schipner, Germany | Dailland Thibaut, France | France |
| 2013 | Ioanina, Greece | Clementine Lucine, France | Natallia Berdnikava, Belarus | Natallia Berdnikava, Belarus | Natallia Berdnikava, Belarus | France |
| 2014 | Přelouč, Czech Republic | Frederick Winter, United Kingdom | Aliaksei Zharnasek, Belarus | Igor Morozov, Russia | Martin Kolman, Czech Republic | Belarus |
| 2014 | Přelouč, Czech Republic | Claire Lise Welter, France | Natallia Berdnikava, Belarus | Marion Mathieu, France | Natallia Berdnikava, Belarus | Belarus |
| 2015 | Choisy-Le-Roi (Paris), France | Daniel Odvarko, Czech Republic | Olivier Fortamps, Belgium | Vladimir Ryanzin, Russia | Adam Sedlmajer, Czech Republic | France |
| 2015 | Choisy-Le-Roi (Paris), France | Manon Costard, France | Natallia Berdnikava, Belarus | Marie Vympranietsova, Greece | Natallia Berdnikava, Belarus | France |
| 2016 | Lleida, Spain | Thomas Degasperi, Italy | Aliaksei Zharnasek, Belarus | Vladimir Ryanzin, Russia | Dailland Thibaut, France | Belarus |
| 2016 | Lleida, Spain | Manon Costard, France | Natallia Berdnikava, Belarus | Natallia Berdnikava, Belarus | Natallia Berdnikava, Belarus | Belarus |
| 2017 | Fischlham, Gmunden, Austria, Italy | Frederick Winter, United Kingdom | Aliaksei Zharnasek, Belarus | Igor Morozov, Russia | Adam Sedlmajer, Czech Republic | Belarus |
| 2017 | Fischlham, Gmunden, Austria, Italy | Clementine Lucine, France | Natallia Berdnikava, Belarus | Natallia Berdnikava, Belarus | Natallia Berdnikava, Belarus | Belarus |
| 2018 | Ioannina, Greece | Sacha Descuns, France | Aliaksei Zharnasek, Belarus | Igor Morozov, Russia | Thibaut Dailland, France | Belarus |
| 2018 | Ioannina, Greece | Hanna Edeback, Sweden | Natallia Berdnikava, Belarus | Natallia Berdnikava, Belarus | Natallia Berdnikava, Belarus | Belarus |
| 2019 | Seseña, Spain | Thomas Degasperi, Italy | Aliaksei Zharnasek, Belarus | Igor Morozov, Russia | Thibaut Dailland, France | France |
| 2019 | Seseña, Spain | Manon Costard, France | Giannina Bonnemann, Germany | Marie Vympranietsova, Greece | Giannina Bonnemann, Germany | France |
| 2020 | Not held | | | | | |
| 2021 | Stratos Lake, Greece | Thomas Degasperi, Italy | Martin Kolman, Czech Republic | Danylo Filchenko, Ukraine | Martin Kolman, Czech Republic | Belarus |
| 2021 | Stratos Lake, Greece | Manon Costard, France | Giannina Bonnemann, Germany | Hanna Straltsova, Belarus | Giannina Bonnemann, Germany | Belarus |
| 2022 | Recetto, Italy | Thomas Degasperi, Italy | Louis Duplan-Fribourg, France | Danylo Filchenko, Ukraine | Louis Duplan-Fribourg, France | France |
| 2022 | Recetto, Italy | Manon Costard, France | Alice Bagnoli, Italy | Marie Vympranietsova, Greece | Alice Bagnoli, Italy | France |
| 2023 | Not held | | | | | |
| 2024 | Baurech, France | Brando Caruso, Italy | Louis Duplan-Fribourg, France | Luca Rauchenwald, Austria | Louis Duplan-Fribourg, France | France |
| 2024 | Baurech, France | Manon Costard, France | Mariya Beliakova, IWF | Marie Vympranietsova, Greece | Alena Parkhomenka, IWF | France |
| 2025 | Steyregg, Austria | Thomas Degasperi, Italy | Danylo Filchenko, Ukraine | Luca Rauchenwald, Austria | Danylo Filchenko, Ukraine | France |
| 2025 | Steyregg, Austria | Kateřina Vrabcová, Czech Republic | Giannina Bonnemann, Germany | Jutta Menestrina, Finland | Giannina Bonnemann, Germany | France |
| 2026 | Poti, Georgia | Sacha Descuns, France | Danylo Filchenko, Ukraine | Luca Rauchenwald, Austria | Danylo Filchenko, Ukraine | Belarus |
| 2026 | Poti, Georgia | Alice Bagnoli, Italy | Alena Parkhomenka, Belarus | Iryna Turets, Belarus | Sofya Hvozdzeva, Belarus | Belarus |

== See also ==
- Water skiing
- Masters Tournament (water ski)
- List of Water Ski World Championships champions
- List of Water Skiing Under-21 European Champions
- List of Water Skiing Under-17 European Champions
