= Robert Goffin =

Belgian author, lawyer, poet

- Robert Goffin with Benny Carter, Louis Armstrong and Leonard Feather in 1942
- Born: 21 May 1898; Ohain, Belgium
- Died: 27 June 1984 (aged 86); Genval, Belgium

Robert Goffin (21 May 1898 – 27 June 1984) was a Belgian lawyer, author, and poet, credited with writing the first "serious" book on jazz, Aux Frontières du Jazz in 1932.

== Life ==
Robert Goffin was born in Ohain, Brabant Province in Belgium in 1898. His mother was unmarried, and his pharmacist grandfather supported them. In 1916, Goffin completed his humanities study at the Athenaeum of Saint-Gilles where he was a classmate of the future artist Paul Delvaux. Two years later, Goffin published his first collection of poetry, Rosaire des soirs (lit. 'Evening Rosary') while he was studying law at the Free University of Brussels.

By 1923, he was a lawyer at the Court of Appeal of Brussels, and in 1928, he married Suzanne Lagrange. During this period, his focus shifted to the new American art form, jazz, and in 1932 he published what is considered the first serious book on the new genre, Aux Frontières du Jazz (lit. 'On the Frontiers of Jazz').

He was active in denouncing the Nazi Germany in Belgium and predicted the German invasion twelve months in advance, creating in 1939 the magazine Alert, which argued for the abandonment of the Belgian neutrality for an alliance with France. He left Belgium for the United States at the outset during World War II, supporting himself through lectures and writing, including essays such as Jazz: from the Congo to the Metropolitan, and novels set in German-occupied Belgium, including La colombe de la Gestapo (lit. 'The Dove of the Gestapo') and The White Brigade (published in French as Passeports pour l'Audelà). In 1942, he collaborated with Leonard Feather to teach what is considered the first course ever on jazz history and analysis, held at the New School for Social Research in New York City.

After the war, he returned to Belgium to again take up his legal activities at the Court of Appeal of Brussels. In 1952, he joined the Royal Academy of French Language and Literature, becoming director in 1971, and director of the Belgian Pen Club in 1956. His wife Suzanne died in 1965 and in the late 1970s, Goffin began a life of semi-retirement on the shores of Lake Genval, dying in 1984.

== Selected works ==
- "The Best Negro Jazz Orchestra", 1934, printed in Negro, Nancy Cunard, ed.
- Was Leopold a traitor?: The story of Belgium's eighteen tragic days, 1941.
- The White Brigade, 1944.
- Patrie de la poésie, 1945.
- Histoire du jazz, 1945.
- La Nouvelle-orleans, Capitale Du Jazz, 1945.
- Jazz from the Congo to the Metropolitan, 1943.
- Horn of Plenty: The Story of Louis Armstrong, originally published as Louis Armstrong, le roi du jazz ("the king of jazz"), 1947.
- Le roi du Colorado ("The king of Colorado"), 1958.
