= Andrew Cooney =

Andrew Cooney may refer to:

- Andrew Cooney (explorer), youngest man (as of 2013) to walk to the South Pole
- Andrew Cooney (Irish republican) (1897–1968), Irish republican who emigrated to the US in the 1940s
