= European Water Skiing Youth Championships =

This is a list of Water Skiing European Championships Champions Under-17 since 1964 and U14.

== Results ==
Year	Place	Slalom	Trick	Jump	Overall	Team
1975	Pusiano Italy	Mike Hazelwood United Kingdom	Mike Hazelwood United Kingdom	Mike Hazelwood United Kingdom	Mike Hazelwood United Kingdom	United Kingdom
1975	Pusiano Italy	Ann Pitt United Kingdom	Paola Franchi Italy	Ann Pitt United Kingdom	Ann Pitt United Kingdom	United Kingdom
1976	Vilvoorde Belgium	Mike Hazelwood United Kingdom	Mike Hazelwood United Kingdom	Mike Hazelwood United Kingdom	Mike Hazelwood United Kingdom	United Kingdom
1976	Vilvoorde Belgium	Kathy Hulme United Kingdom	Anita Carlman Sweden	Lisbeth Lindbladh Sweden	Anita Carlman Sweden	United Kingdom
1977	Princes United Kingdom	Mario Savoini Italy	Mario Savoini Italy	Moshe Ganzi Israel	Mario Savoini Italy	United Kingdom
1977	Princes United Kingdom	Philippa Roberts United Kingdom	Philippa Roberts United Kingdom	Kathy Hulme United Kingdom	Philippa Roberts United Kingdom	United Kingdom
1978	Jyvaskyla Finland	John West United Kingdom	Mario Savoini Italy	Mario Savoini Italy	Pierre Carmin France	United Kingdom
1978	Jyvaskyla Finland	Fanny Meijer Netherlands	Corinne Meunier France	Philippa Roberts United Kingdom	Philippa Roberts United Kingdom	United Kingdom
1979	Yugoslavia Yugoslavia	Andy Mapple United Kingdom	Tanguy Benet France	B. Jung Germany	Pierre Carmin France	France France
1979	Yugoslavia Yugoslavia	Fanny Meyer Netherlands	Galina Vorobeva Soviet Union	G. Pusch	Fanny Meyer Netherlands	France France
1980	Ricardo Sans United Kingdom	Andy Mapple United Kingdom	Alexander Minenok Soviet Union	Pedro Tunsch Spain	Andy Mapple United Kingdom	France France
1980	Ricardo Sans United Kingdom	Olga Goubarenko Soviet Union	Corinne Meunier France	Sonia Truzzi Italy	Corinne Meunier France	France France
1981	Lago Arancio Italy	Mike Kiellander Sweden	Mike Kiellander Sweden	Dan Ohayon Switzerland	Mike Kiellander Sweden	Sweden
1981	Lago Arancio Italy	Olga Goubarenko Soviet Union	Marie Pierre Seigneur France	Andrea Husiak Yugoslavia	Marie Pierre Seigneur France	Sweden
1982	Södertalje France	Pål Mortensen Sweden	Gennadi Vazhnik Soviet Union	Mike Kiellander Sweden	Gennadi Vazhnik Soviet Union	Soviet Union
1982	Södertalje France	Marie Pierre Seigneur France	Elena Mazovka Soviet Union	Jane Bubear United Kingdom	Jane Bubear United Kingdom	Soviet Union
1983	Giovani Italy	Emmanuel Ruggenberg Belgium	Andrea Alessi Italy	Andrea Alessi Italy	N/a	N/a
1983	Giovani Italy	Ingela Fundin Sweden	Nicola Rasey United Kingdom	Nicola Rasey United Kingdom	N/a	N/a
1984	Banyoles Spain	Massimo Sonzogni Italy	Stanislav Kornev Soviet Union	Andrea Alessi Italy	Shawn Bronson United Kingdom	France
1984	Banyoles Spain	Helena Kiellander Sweden	Helena Kiellander Sweden	Nicola Rasey United Kingdom	Helena Kiellander Sweden	France
1985	Eau d’Heure Belgium	Neil Staples United Kingdom	Luc Seigneur France	Dimitri Yaskevitch Soviet Union	Dimitri Yaskevitch Soviet Union	France
1985	Eau d’Heure Belgium	Claudia Gusenbauer Austria	Natalie Besombes France	Claudia Gusenbauer Austria	Odile Flubacker France	France
1986	Lago Arancio Italy	Brett Hodgkins United Kingdom	Dimitri Ivanov Soviet Union	Brett Hodgkins United Kingdom	Brett Hodgkins United Kingdom	France
1986	Lago Arancio Italy	Olga Pavlova Soviet Union	Barbara Gattone Italy	Olga Pavlova Soviet Union	Barbara Gattone Italy	France
1987	Hazelwood, Lincoln United Kingdom	Richard Kjellander Sweden	Patrizio Buzzotta Italy	Brett Hodgkins United Kingdom	Brett Hodgkins United Kingdom	United Kingdom
1987	Hazelwood, Lincoln United Kingdom	Zdena Samohylova Czechoslovakia	Svetlana Kobialko Soviet Union	Anahi Arbaizar Spain	Svetlana Kobialko Soviet Union	United Kingdom
1988	Enebakk Norway	Mirko Tognala Italy	Aymeric Benet France	Christopher Duverger France	Danny Budd United Kingdom	Soviet Union
1988	Enebakk Norway	Sonia Vilella Spain	Natalia Ivanova Soviet Union	Julia Gromyko Soviet Union	Natalia Ivanova Soviet Union	Soviet Union
1989	Ioannina Greece	Christian Rampanelli Italy	Vladislav Dotchev Bulgaria	Marc Grinhaff United Kingdom	Florian Pemler Germany	N/a
1989	Ioannina Greece	Pascale Dureux France	Lada Tumova Czechoslovakia	Khatuna Korkelia Soviet Union	Lada Tumova Czechoslovakia	N/a
1990	Handel Netherlands	Ivan Morros Spain	Nicolas Leforestier France	Stefan Tunsch Spain	Oleg Devijatovskij Soviet Union	Soviet Union
1990	Handel Netherlands	Nataly Anisimova Soviet Union	Corinna Williams United Kingdom	Sophie Chapiron France	Nataly Anisimova Soviet Union	Soviet Union
1991	Roquebrune France	Stefan Tunsch Spain	Warren Morgan United Kingdom	Stefan Tunsch Spain	Warren Morgan United Kingdom	France
1991	Roquebrune France	Geraldine Jamin France	Marina Mosti Italy	Laurence Venet France	Marina Mosti Italy	France
1992	Krenek Czech Republic	Glen Campbell United Kingdom	Dennis Van Oye Netherlands	Alexandr Michailenko Ukraine	Jason Seels United Kingdom	United Kingdom
1992	Krenek Czech Republic	Sarah Gatty Saunt United Kingdom	Angeliki Andriopoulou Greece	Nicola Huntridge United Kingdom	Angeliki Andriopoulou France	United Kingdom
1993	Sperlonga Italy	Jason Seels United Kingdom	Eric Dureux France	Jason Seels United Kingdom	Jason Seels United Kingdom	Greece
1993	Sperlonga Italy	Angeliki Andriopoulou Greece	Angeliki Andriopoulou Greece	Angeliki Andriopoulou Greece	Angeliki Andriopoulou Greece	Greece
1994	Moissac France	Guillaume Pomes France	Julien Heaney United Kingdom	Jesper Cassoe Denmark	Paul Price United Kingdom	France
1994	Moissac France	Marie Toms United Kingdom	Petra Stehnova Czech Republic	Elodie Vermeil France	Marie Toms United Kingdom	France
1995	Krenek Czech Republic	Jan Danihelka Czech Republic	Olivier Fortamps Belgium	Marco Brambilla Italy	George Hatzis Greece	United Kingdom
1995	Krenek Czech Republic	Sharon Van Oye Netherlands	Marie Toms United Kingdom	Karine Jacquier France	Sharon Van Oye Netherlands	United Kingdom
1996	Vilvoorde Belgium	Luca Mazza Italy	Marco Riva Italy	Damien Sharman United Kingdom	Tom Asher United Kingdom	United Kingdom
1996	Vilvoorde Belgium	Rachel Crosland United Kingdom	Marie Toms United Kingdom	Svetlana Urban Belarus	Rachel Crosland United Kingdom	United Kingdom
1997	Ravenna Italy	Marco Riva Italy	Marco Riva Italy	Aurelien Serrault France	Marco Riva Italy	France
1997	Ravenna Italy	Clementine Lucine France	Federica Primatesta Italy	Karine Jacquier France	Clementine Lucine France	France
1998	Moissac France	Patrick Julien Esnard France	Erast Kirilov Belarus	Aurelien Serrault France	Patrick Julien Esnard France	France
1998	Moissac France	Rachel Crosland United Kingdom	Clementine Lucine France	Clementine Lucine France	Clementine Lucine France	France
1999	Lake Stratos Greece	Sean Bezuidenhout South Africa	Christopher Sumner United Kingdom	William Asher United Kingdom	William Asher United Kingdom	France
1999	Lake Stratos Greece	Flora Liakou Greece	Celine Sadrant France	Tatiana Niebuhr United Arab Emirates	Flora Liakou Greece	France
2000	Krenek Czech Republic	Joffrey Malaquin France	Eric Marberg Sweden	Joffrey Malaquin France	Eric Marberg Sweden	France
2000	Krenek Czech Republic	Julie Laure Coassin France	Tatiana Niebuhr United Arab Emirates	Floriane Noel France	Tatiana Niebuhr United Arab Emirates	France
2001	Lendorf Austria	Carlo Allais Italy	Florent Reyre France	Eric Marberg Sweden	Eric Marberg Sweden	France
2001	Lendorf Austria	Marion Mathieu France	Marion Mathieu France	Marion Mathieu France	Marion Mathieu France	France
2002	Vilvoorde Belgium	Matteo Ianni Italy	Florent Reyre France	Florent Reyre France	Quentin Lafosse France	France
2002	Vilvoorde Belgium	Marion Mathieu France	Maryia Veramchuk Belarus	Marion Mathieu France	Marion Mathieu France	France
2003	Feldberg Germany	Matteo Ianni Italy	Kolman Zdenek Czech Republic	Sam Haslam United Kingdom	Daniel Odvarko Czech Republic	France
2003	Feldberg Germany	Maryia Veramchuk Belarus	Maryia Veramchuk Belarus	Nancy Chardin France	Maryia Veramchuk Belarus	France
2004	Krenek Czech Republic	Loic Ricaud France	Zdenek Kolman Czech Republic	Stephen Critchley United Kingdom	Adam Sedlmajer Czech Republic	France
2004	Krenek Czech Republic	Nicole Arthur United Kingdom	Nancy Chardin France	Nancy Chardin France	Nancy Chardin France	France
2005	Linköping Sweden	Stelio Merolla Italy	Herman Beliakou Belarus	Stephen Critchley United Kingdom	Herman Beliakou Belarus	France
2005	Linköping Sweden	Nancy Chardin France	Marion Aynaud France	Nancy Chardin France	Nancy Chardin France	France
2006	Mechelen Belgium	Alexander Anthony United Kingdom	Herman Beliakou Belarus	Bojan Schipner Germany	Herman Beliakou Belarus	France
2006	Mechelen Belgium	Irena Rohrer Austria	Manon Costard France	Tina Rauchenwald Austria	Karina Sergeeva Italy	France
2007	Meuzak France	Sacha Descuns France	Alexandre Poteau France	Thibaut Dailland France	Thibaut Dailland France	France
2007	Meuzak France	Ambre Franc Germany	Marion Aynaud France	Tina Rauchenwald Austria	Marion Aynaud France	France
2008	Segrate Italy	Sacha Descuns France	Martin Kolman Czech Republic	Stavros Lambrou Greece	Martin Kolman Czech Republic	France
2008	Segrate Italy	Silvia Caruso Italy	Iris Cambray France	Manon Costard France	Manon Costard France	France
2009	Orthez France	Sacha Descuns France	Martin Kolman Czech Republic	Matthias Swoboda Austria	Martin Kolman Czech Republic	France
2009	Orthez France	Camille Poulain-Ferarios France	Iris Cambray France	Hanna Straltsova Belarus	Iris Cambray France	France
2010	Fischlham Austria	Berio Edoardo Italy	Ilya Labkovich Belarus	Christopher Wharton United Kingdom	Ilya Labkovich Belarus	Belarus
2010	Fischlham Austria	Charlotte Wharton United Kingdom	Giannina Bonnemann Germany	Camille Poulain-Ferarios France	Giannina Bonnemann Germany	Belarus
2011	Dnipropetrovsk Ukraine	Brando Caruso Italy	Ilya Labkovich Belarus	Andreas Weichhart Austria	Dorien Llewellyn Austria	Belarus
2011	Dnipropetrovsk Ukraine	Camille Poulain-Ferarios France	Hanna Straltsova Belarus	Hanna Straltsova Belarus	Camille Poulain-Ferarios France	Belarus
2012	Maurik Netherlands	Eamon Van Der Merwe South Africa	Gianmarco Pajni Italy	Borysewicz Kamil / Dorien Llewellyn PolandAustria	Dorien Llewellyn Austria	Belarus
2012	Maurik Netherlands	Marta Simoes Portugal	Alice Bagnoli Italy	Orlitsch Lisa Austria	Chiara Bonnemann Germany	Belarus
2013	Nemours France	Brando Caruso Italy	Gianmarco Pajni Italy	Jack Critchley United Kingdom	Dorien Llewellyn Austria	Italy
2013	Nemours France	Alice Bagnoli Italy	Alice Bagnoli Italy	Mara Salmina Austria	Alice Bagnoli Italy	Italy
2014	Sesena Spain	Jakob Bogne Sweden	Danylo Filchenko Ukraine	Leo Anguenot France	Leo Anguenot France	United Kingdom
2014	Sesena Spain	Alice Bagnoli Italy	Anna Pirozhenko Ukraine	Aliaksandra Danisheuskaya Belarus	Aliaksandra Danisheuskaya Belarus	United Kingdom
2015	Roma Italy	Joel Poland United Kingdom	Leo Anguenot France	Felix Blomqvist Sweden	Leo Anguenot France	France
2015	Roma Italy	Maryia Leshchanka Belarus	Olga Ivlyushkina Ukraine	Ginevra Buonopane Italy	Olga Ivlyushkina Ukraine	France
2016	Recetto Italy	Louis Duplan-Fribourg France	Louis Duplan-Fribourg France	Joel Poland United Kingdom	Louis Duplan-Fribourg France	France
2016	Recetto Italy	Lea Miermont France	Pirri Beatrice Italy	Ginevra Buonopane Italy	Sofia Maksimenkova Ukraine	France
2017	Sesena Spain	Louis Duplan-Fribourg France	Edoardo Marenzi Italy	Louis Duplan-Fribourg France	Louis Duplan-Fribourg France	Ukraine
2017	Sesena Spain	Valeryia Trubskaya Belarus	Stanislava Prosvetova Ukraine	Sofia Maksimenkova Ukraine	Stanislava Prosvetova Ukraine	Ukraine
2018	Dnipro Ukraine	Nicolas Rousselot France	Pol Duplan-Fribourg France	Pol Duplan-Fribourg France	Pol Duplan-Fribourg France	Belarus
2018	Dnipro Ukraine	Valeryia Trubskaya Belarus	Alena Parkhomenka Belarus	Inès Anguenot France	Stanislava Prosvetova Ukraine	Belarus
2019	Roquebrune-sur-Argens France	Dani Teixidor Spain	Alexander Samoilov Ukraine	Alexander Samoilov Ukraine	Alexander Samoilov Ukraine	Belarus
2019	Roquebrune-sur-Argens France	Inès Anguenot France	Ibe Beckers Belgium	Stanislava Prosvetova Ukraine	Alena Parkhomenka Belarus	Belarus
2020	Seseña Spain	Kamil Belmrah Morocco	Pol Duplan-Fribourg France	Pol Duplan-Fribourg France	Pol Duplan-Fribourg France	Italy
2020	Seseña Spain	Florentia Loizidou Cyprus	Ibe Beckers Belgium	Pia Mattersdorfer Austria	Maryia Belskaya Belarus	Italy
2021	Seseña Spain	Kamil Belmrah Morocco	Vincenzo Marino Italy	Florian Parth Italy	Damir Filaretov Ukraine	Belarus
2021	Seseña Spain	Florentia Loizidou Cyprus	Maryia Kazelskaya Belarus	Pia Mattersdorfer Austria	Maryia Kazelskaya Belarus	Belarus
2022	Ioannina Greece	Damir Filaretov Ukraine	Damir Filaretov Ukraine	Damir Filaretov Ukraine	Damir Filaretov Ukraine	Italy
2022	Ioannina Greece	Philippa Attensam Austria	Nina Maria Mezzetti Italy	Nina Maria Mezzetti Italy	Nina Maria Mezzetti Italy	Italy
2023	Seseña Spain	Tim Wild Germany	Tristan Duplan-Fribourg France	Tristan Duplan-Fribourg France	Tim Wild Germany	Germany
2023	Seseña Spain	Lisa Gusenbauer Austria	Marie-Lou Duverger France	Maise Jacobsen Denmark	Marie-Lou Duverger France	Germany
2024	Recetto Italy	Matteo Georges France	Axel Garcia France	Tim Wild Germany	Tim Wild Germany	France
2024	Recetto Italy	Ines Solé Belgium	Klaudie Kmentová Czech Republic	Maise Jacobsen Denmark	Marie-Lou Duverger France	France
2025	Seseña Spain	Matteo Georges France	Axel Garcia France	Ivan Zelentsov Ukraine	Mykhailo Mykhailichenko Ukraine	Ukraine
2025	Seseña Spain	Ines Solé Belgium	Mariia Popova Ukraine	Maise Jacobsen Denmark	Mariia Popova Ukraine	Ukraine
2026	Stratos Lake Greece	Mykhailo Mykhailichenko Ukraine	Mykhailo Mykhailichenko Ukraine	Ivan Zelentsov Ukraine	Mykhailo Mykhailichenko Ukraine	Ukraine
2026	Stratos Lake Greece	Kseniya Revotska Belarus	Mariia Popova Ukraine	Scarlett Graham Italy	Mariia Popova Ukraine	Ukraine

== See also ==
- Water skiing
- Masters Tournament (water ski)
- World water skiing champions
- List of Water Skiing European Champions
- List of Water Skiing Under-21 European Champions
