= European Water Skiing U21 Championships =

This is a list of Water Ski European Championships champions Under-21 since 1990.

== Results ==
Year	Place	Slalom	Trick	Jump	Overall	Team
1990	Bourg-en-Bresse France	Steffen Wild Germany	Nicolas LeForestier France	Steffen Wild Germany	Steffen Wild Germany	United Kingdom
1990	Bourg-en-Bresse France	Frederique Savin France	Frederique Savin France	Anahi Arbaizar Spain	Frederique Savin France	United Kingdom
1991	Milano Italy	Jodi Fisher United Kingdom	Nikolas Leforestier France	Danny Budd United Kingdom	Patrizio Buzzotta Italy	Italy
1991	Milano Italy	Frederique Savin France	Frederique Savin France	Marina Mosti Italy	Frederique Savin France	Italy
1992	Bourg-en-Bresse France	Ivan Morros Spain	Aymeric Benet France	Stefan Tunch Spain	Christian Rampanelli Italy	United Kingdom
1992	Bourg-en-Bresse France	Sarah Gatty-Saunt United Kingdom	Frederique Savin France	Corinna Williams United Kingdom	Corinna Williams United Kingdom	United Kingdom
1993	Casteldefels Spain	Stefan Tunsch Spain	Jason Seels United Kingdom	Fabian Raidel Austria	Florian Pemler Germany	United Kingdom
1993	Casteldefels Spain	Christina Muggiasca Switzerland	Elena Milakova Russia	Nicola Huntridge United Kingdom	Elena Milakova Russia	United Kingdom
1994	Avigliana Italy	Dimitri Gamzukoff France	Oleg Deviatrovski Belarus	Jason Seels United Kingdom	Jason Seels United Kingdom	United Kingdom
1994	Avigliana Italy	Nicola Huntridge United Kingdom	Elena Milakova Russia	Nicola Huntridge United Kingdom	Marina Mosti Italy	United Kingdom
1995	Thorpe, London United Kingdom	Ivan Morros Spain	Sebastian Cans France	Paul Price United Kingdom	Jason Seels United Kingdom	United Kingdom
1995	Thorpe, London United Kingdom	Sarah Gatty-Saunt United Kingdom	Marina Mosti Italy	Nicola Huntridge United Kingdom	Marina Mosti Italy	United Kingdom
1996	Thorpe, London United Kingdom	Tom Asher United Kingdom	Marco Riva Italy	Jason Seels United Kingdom	Jason Seels United Kingdom	United Kingdom
1996	Thorpe, London United Kingdom	Geraldine Jamin France	Sarah Gatty Saunt United Kingdom	Angeliki Andriopoulou Greece	Sarah Gatty Saunt United Kingdom	United Kingdom
1997	Krenek Czech Republic	Mathias Lundberg Sweden	Oliver Fortamps Belgium	Thomas Fenzl Austria	Thomas Fenzl Austria	United Kingdom
1997	Krenek Czech Republic	Sarah Gatty- Saunt United Kingdom	Angeliki Andriopoulou Greece	Angeliki Andriopoulou Greece	Angeliki Andriopoulou Greece	United Kingdom
1998	Kamenz Germany	Mathias Lundberg Sweden	Olivier Fortramps Belgium	Jesper Cassoe Denmark	Thomas Asher United Kingdom	Italy
1998	Kamenz Germany	Marjolein Jongepier Netherlands	Frederica Primatesta Italy	June Fladborg Denmark	Marjolein Jongepier Netherlands	Italy
1999	Lac du Der France	Patrick Julien-Esnard France	Olivier Fortramps Belgium	Thomas Asher United Kingdom	Thomas Asher United Kingdom	France
1999	Lac du Der France	Clementine Lucine France	Clementine Lucine France	Maria Vibranietsova Greece	Clementine Lucine France	France
2000	Recetto Italy	William Asher United Kingdom	Marco Riva Italy	Patrick Julien Esnard France	Marco Riva Italy	United Kingdom
2000	Recetto Italy	Clementine Lucine France	Natalia Berndikova Belarus	Marie Toms United Kingdom	Anais Amade France	United Kingdom
2001	Quinta Grande Portugal	Thomas Degasperi Italy	Aliaksei Zharnasek Belarus	Thomas Asher United Kingdom	Marco Riva Italy	France
2001	Quinta Grande Portugal	Clementine Lucine France	Clementine Lucine France	Clementine Lucine France	Clementine Lucine France	France
2002	Agrinio Greece	Thomas Degasperi Italy	Joffrey Malaquin France	Aurelien Serrault France	William Asher United Kingdom	United Kingdom
2002	Agrinio Greece	Julie-Laure Coassin France	Julie-Laure Coassin France	Luisa Zettining Austria	Julie-Laure Coassin France	United Kingdom
2003	Thorpe, London United Kingdom	William Asher United Kingdom	Florent Reyre France	Aurelien Serrault France	William Asher United Kingdom	France
2003	Thorpe, London United Kingdom	Nicole Arthur United Kingdom	Marion Mathieu France	Stinne Sondergaard Denmark	Marion Mathieu France	France
2004	Fagersta Sweden	Matteo Ianni Italy	Daniel Odvarko Czech Republic	Paul Fourastier France	Joffrey Malaquin France	France
2004	Fagersta Sweden	Nicole Arthur United Kingdom	Marion Mathieu France	Luisa Zettining Austria	Marion Mathieu France	France
2005	Orthez France	Matteo Ianni Italy	Frank Desboyaux France	Steven Critcley United Kingdom	Frank Desboyaux France	France
2005	Orthez France	Claire Lise Welter France	Maria Veramchuk Belarus	Nancy Chardin France	Nancy Chardin France	France
2006	Vilvoorde Belgium	Adam Sedlmajer Czech Republic	Loris Lambrigger Switzerland	Steven Critcley United Kingdom	Adam Sedlmajer Czech Republic	France
2006	Vilvoorde Belgium	Nicole Arthur United Kingdom	Maria Veramchuk Belarus	Nancy Chardin France	Nancy Chardin France	France
2007	Brescia Italy	Matteo Luzzeri Italy	Herman Beliakou Belarus	Steven Critcley United Kingdom	Adam Sedlmajer Czech Republic	France
2007	Brescia Italy	Nicole Arthur United Kingdom	Marion Aynaud France	Nancy Chardin Denmark	Nancy Chardin France	France
2008	Tampere Finland	Martin Bartalsky Slovakia	Herman Beliakou Belarus	Claudio Köstenberger Austria	Martin Bartalsky Slovakia	France
2008	Tampere Finland	Nicole Arthur United Kingdom	Marion Aynaud France	Jutta Lammi Finland	Marion Aynaud France	France
2009	Skarnes Norway	Fred Winter United Kingdom	Alexandre Poteau France	Claudio Köstenberger Austria	Martin Kolman Czech Republic	France
2009	Skarnes Norway	Manon Costard France	Nancy Chardin France	Nancy Chardin France	Nancy Chardin France	France
2010	Meuzac France	Sacha Descuns France	Pierre Ballon France	Bojan Schipner Germany	Martin Kolman Czech Republic	Italy
2010	Meuzac France	Ambre Franc France	Cambray Iris France	Lisa Francke Sweden	Maria Luisa Pajni Italy	Italy
2011	Sesena Spain	Fred Winter United Kingdom	Martin Kolman Czech Republic	Efverström Daniel Sweden	Martin Kolman Czech Republic	France
2011	Sesena Spain	Manon Costard France	Marion Mathieu France	Manon Costard France	Manon Costard France	France
2012	Lake Grappa South Africa	Luca Spinelli Italy	Martin Kolman Czech Republic	Efverström Daniel Sweden	Martin Kolman Czech Republic	Italy
2012	Lake Grappa South Africa	Pamela Fox United Kingdom	Maria Luisa Pajni Italy	Danielle Shorten United Kingdom	Maria Luisa Pajni Italy	Italy
2013	Linköping Sweden	Daniel Efverström Sweden	Martin Kolman Czech Republic	Daniel Efverström Sweden	Martin Kolman Czech Republic	Belarus
2013	Linköping Sweden	Marta Simoes Portugal	Giannina Bonnemann Germany	Giannina Bonnemann Germany	Giannina Bonnemann Germany	Belarus
2014	Recetto Italy	Brando Caruso Italy	Gianmarco Pajni Italy	Aliaksandr Isayeu Belarus	Aliaksandr Isayeu Belarus	Belarus
2014	Recetto Italy	Chiara Bonnemann Germany	Iris Cambray France	Giannina Bonnemann Germany	Giannina Bonnemann Germany	Belarus
2015	Llieda Spain	Brando Caruso Italy	Gianmarco Pajni Italy	Jack Critcley United Kingdom	Tanguy Dailland France	France
2015	Llieda Spain	Chiara Bonnemann Germany	Giannina Bonnemann Germany	Giannina Bonnemann Germany	Giannina Bonnemann Germany	France
2016	Scarnes Norway	Brando Caruso Italy	Danylo Filchenko Ukraine	Jack Critcley United Kingdom	Tanguy Dailland France	Belarus
2016	Scarnes Norway	Alice Bagnoli Italy	Ekaterina Kisialeva Belarus	Charlotte Warton Belarus	Aliaksandra Danisheuskaya Belarus	Belarus
2017	Seseña Spain	Brando Caruso Italy	Danylo Filchenko Ukraine	Jack Critchley United Kingdom	Danylo Filchenko Ukraine	Belarus
2017	Seseña Spain	Alice Bagnoli Italy	Aliaksandra Danisheuskaya Belarus	Aliaksandra Danisheuskaya Belarus	Aliaksandra Danisheuskaya Belarus	Belarus
2018	Roquebrune-sur-Argens France	Jakob Bogne Sweden	Lindsay Bordier France	Joel Poland United Kingdom	Joel Poland United Kingdom	United Kingdom
2018	Roquebrune-sur-Argens France	Alice Bagnoli Italy	Aliaksandra Danisheuskaya Belarus	Aliaksandra Danisheuskaya Belarus	Aliaksandra Danisheuskaya Belarus	United Kingdom
2019	Dnipro Ukraine	Jakob Bogne Sweden	Danylo Filchenko Ukraine	Danylo Filchenko Ukraine	Danylo Filchenko Ukraine	Ukraine
2019	Dnipro Ukraine	Lea Miermont France	Stanislava Prosvetova Ukraine	Marie-Lou Moulanier France	Stanislava Prosvetova Ukraine	Ukraine
2020	Seseña Spain	Tim Törnquist Sweden	Lindsay Bordier France	Alexander Samoilov Ukraine	Alexander Samoilov Ukraine	Ukraine
2020	Seseña Spain	Inès Anguenot France	Nicola Kuhn Austria	Stanislava Prosvetova Ukraine	Stanislava Prosvetova Ukraine	Ukraine
2021	Seseña Spain	Tim Törnquist Sweden	Lindsay Bordier France	Alexander Samoilov Ukraine	Alexander Samoilov Ukraine	Ukraine
2021	Seseña Spain	Inès Anguenot France	Stanislava Prosvetova Ukraine	Stanislava Prosvetova Ukraine	Stanislava Prosvetova Ukraine	Ukraine
2022	Fischlham Austria	Tim Törnquist Sweden	Pol Duplan-Fribourg France	Florian Parth Italy	Pol Duplan-Fribourg France	France
2022	Fischlham Austria	Inès Anguenot France	Inès Anguenot France	Inès Anguenot France	Inès Anguenot France	France
2023	Baurech France	Nikolaus Attensam Austria	Dominic Kuhn Austria	Antoine Morin France	Damir Filaretov Ukraine	France
2023	Baurech France	Julie Fah Switzerland	Inès Anguenot France	Lili Steiner Austria	Inès Anguenot France	France
2024	Lacanau France	Florian Parth Italy	Axel Garcia France	Florian Parth Italy	Damir Filaretov Ukraine	Austria
2024	Lacanau France	Arianna Sacco Italy	Marie-Lou Duverger France	Maise Jacobsen Denmark	Sofya Hvozdzeva	Austria
2025	Groß-Enzersdorf Austria	Benjamin Souci France	Tim Wild Germany	Tim Wild Germany	Tim Wild Germany	Austria
2025	Groß-Enzersdorf Austria	Vittoria Saracco Italy	Sofya Hvozdzeva	Maise Jacobsen Denmark	Sofya Hvozdzeva	Austria
2026	Bremerhaven Germany	Benjamin Souci France	Axel Garcia France	Tim Wild Germany	Tim Wild Germany	Germany
2026	Bremerhaven Germany	Ines Solé Belgium	Klaudie Kmentová Czech Republic	Katharina Hafner Austria	Leny Wenzel Germany	Germany

== See also ==
- Water skiing
- Masters Tournament (water ski)
- World water skiing champions
- List of Water Skiing European Champions
- List of Water Skiing Under-17 European Champions

== Results ==
- "History Of Results – IWWF Waterski Europe". Archived from the original on 2024-03-03.
