= List of protected heritage sites in Rixensart =

This table shows an overview of the protected heritage sites in the Walloon town Rixensart. This list is part of Belgium's national heritage.

Object	Year/architect	Town/section	Address	Coordinates	Number^{?}	Image
Castle and its outbuildings ^{(nl)} ^{(fr)}		Rixensart		50.715587°N 4.536109°E	25091-CLT-0001-01 Info	Kasteel en zijn dependances
Castle and surrounding area ^{(nl)} ^{(fr)}		Rixensart		50.723997°N 4.544990°E	25091-CLT-0002-01 Info	Kasteel en omliggende terreinen
Chapel and the surrounding trees at the intersection of the rue de Bruxelles and rue du Tilleul ^{(nl)} ^{(fr)}		Rixensart		50.738439°N 4.552773°E	25091-CLT-0003-01 Info	
La Grande Bruyère ^{(nl)} ^{(fr)}		Rixensart		50.718601°N 4.511416°E	25091-CLT-0005-01 Info	
Valley of the Lasne ^{(nl)} ^{(fr)}		Rixensart		50.724005°N 4.545026°E	25091-CLT-0006-01 Info	
Marais de Genval, located at the confluence of the Lasne and the Argentine ^{(nl)} ^{(fr)}		Rixensart		50.726056°N 4.528009°E	25091-CLT-0007-01 Info	
Protection of the left bank of the Lasne, triangular plot of the confluence of the Lasne and Argentina and a buffer zone between the waterway and the rue de Limalsart ^{(nl)} ^{(fr)}		Rixensart		50.726056°N 4.528009°E	25091-CLT-0008-01 Info	
Parts of the building "Villa Beau Site", avenue des Combattants n ° 17, namely: the roof, four walls including the access steps at the side, the roof of the porch and the balustrade at the front of the facade at street level, ceilings, walls and floor of the lobby on the ground floor including doors and brass work, the wallpaper, bathroom, hall, doors, Pich-pin on the second floor including the sink. ^{(nl)} ^{(fr)}		Rixensart		50.716791°N 4.501603°E	25091-CLT-0009-01 Info	
The facades and roofs of the castle of the Princes of Merode, excluding the outbuildings and the church of Sainte-Croix (1937) ^{(nl)} ^{(fr)}		Rixensart		50.715587°N 4.536109°E	25091-PEX-0001-01 Info	De gevels en daken van het kasteel van de Prinsen van Mérode, uitgesloten de bijgebouwen en de kerk Sainte-Croix (1937)

== See also ==
- Lists of protected heritage sites in Walloon Brabant
- Rixensart
