= Jean-Dominique Burton =

Belgian photographer

Jean-Dominique Burton, born on 13 October 1952 in Huy (Belgium), is a Belgian photographer and filmmaker, author of several books of photographs focusing on Europe, Asia and Africa. Since 1978, numerous exhibitions have been dedicated to his work, in Europe (in galleries and in the Paris metro), Africa (notably on the occasion of the Francophonie Summit, OIF, in November 2014), North America (San Francisco and Stanford University) and Asia. Many of his works have also been included in public and private collections.

== Biography ==
For more than twenty years, he travelled from the Atlas Mountains to the Himalayas where he produced numerous photographic works. Since the early 2000s, he has been working on African civilisations, building a trilogy on Porto-Novo, Abomey and Ouidah, three cities in Benin that played an active part in the history of the Slave Trade and of which the island of Gorée (Senegal) has become the symbol.

Since 2010, he has also been making short documentaries and/or contemplative films, as animated and audio complements to his photographic approach.

Since its creation in 2005, he has been linked to the Fondation Zinsou (Cotonou-Benin) with which he has held three exhibitions and three publications. He is also present in the permanent collection of the Museum of Contemporary Art in Ouidah (Villa Ajavon), inaugurated by the Foundation in 2013.

In Africa, Jean-Dominique Burton has produced photographic works dedicated to the traditional chiefs of Burkina Faso, Beninese Voodoo, the Nago hunters of Bantè, Benin, the Matonge neighbourhoods of Kinshasa and Brussels, the city of Porto-Novo and the island of Gorée.

When he is not travelling, Jean-Dominique Burton lives in Belgium, in Rixensart, a small municipality in Walloon Brabant.

== Bibliography ==
- Sans Papiers Photographiques – Prisme éditions, 2019
- Île de Gorée Island, – Prisme éditions, 2014
- Chasseurs Nagô du Royaume de Bantè, Fondation George Arthur Forrest / Fondation Zinsou. 2012
- Porto-Novo, cité rouge esprit de lagune, Fondation Zinsou, 2011
- Matonge / Matonge, éditions Lannoo, 2010
- Porto-Novo, édition digitale limitée, PMR, 2009
- Souvenirs d’Afrique – Herinneringen uit Africa, 5 Continents – Musée de l’Afrique centrale, 2008
- Vaudou /Voodoo/ Vudu, 5 Continents – Fondation Zinsou, 2007
- Naabas: Traditional Chiefs of Burkina Faso, Snoeck, Gand, 2006
- L’Allée des Rois, Ed. Altitude – Snoeck, 2004
- The Rebirth of the Budapest Gresham Palace – CBR – Altitude – 2004
- Hong-Kong Vision, Bruxelles, Hong-Kong Economic and Trade – Office, 2001
- Masques et Traces, Bruxelles, Soleil noir, 1999
- Wallonie/Kent, Charleroi, musée de la Photographie, 1999–2000
- Hong-Kong Transit, en collaboration avec France Borel, Bruxelles, ZB 22, 1997
- Viêt-View, Bruxelles, Glénat – Benelux, 1996
- Semois: les derniers planteurs, Bruxelles, éditions de l’Octogone, 1995
- Écorces, Bruxelles, éditions de l’Octogone, 1994
- Épreuves d’artistes, Namur, Remo Zandona, 1990
- Double Portrait, un Sculpteur / un Photographe – Formes et Lumières – Portfolio 5 exemplaires – 1989
- Collectionneurs – Portfolio 5 exemplaires – 1988
- Portraits d’Hier Aujourd’hui – Portfolio 5 exemplaires – 1985
