= Francisco Hernando Contreras =

Spanish builder (1945–2020)

- Born: 2 June 1945; Madrid
- Died: 3 April 2020 (aged 74); Madrid

Francisco Hernando Contreras (2 June 1945 – 3 April 2020), known as Paco el Pocero, was a Spanish businessman in the construction industry.

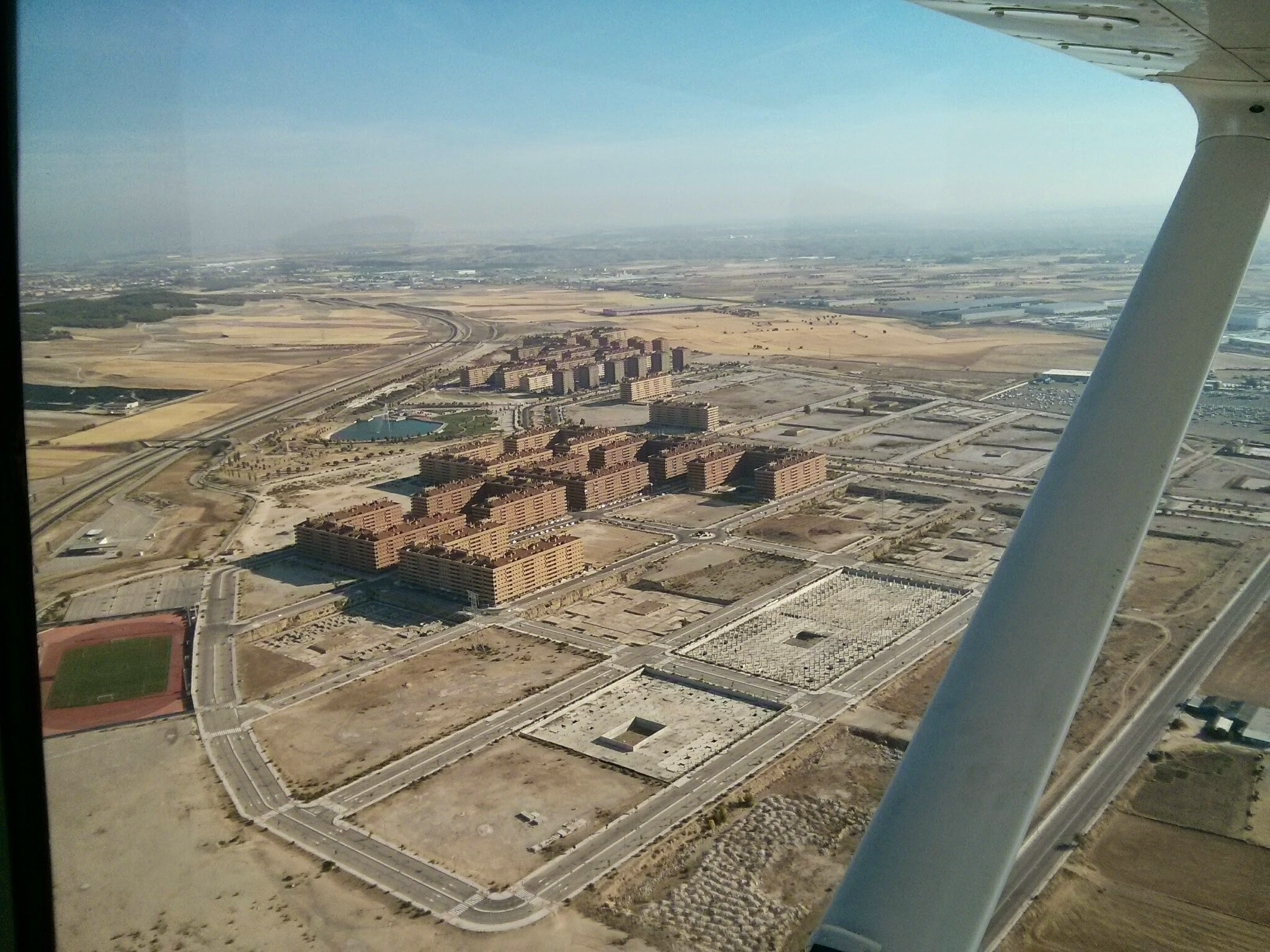
Seseña

From a humble background, Hernando became a prominent builder in the Madrid area. His most famous project is probably Seseña near Madrid, where he promised to build 13,500 residences. Following the collapse of the Spanish property bubble, he went to Equatorial Guinea leaving Spanish projects unfinished.

He died on 3 April 2020 of coronavirus disease 2019.
