= Marie Toms =

British waterskier (born 1979)

Marie Louise Toms (born 8 December 1979) is a British waterskier. She was a member of the British Waterski Team from 1991 to 2004, after which she took a break from the sport, returning in 2007 to win the British National Slalom Championship in the 25–35 age group. She was the European under-21 champion in 2000.

Toms was born in Nottingham, England and grew up in Bleasby, Nottinghamshire, attending Southwell Minster School. At the time of modelling for a swimwear fashion feature in a local newspaper during 2003, she was working as a fitness instructor in Bingham, Nottinghamshire.

Toms later moved to the Isle of Dogs in East London.
