= The Minster School, Southwell =

The Minster School

Location
- Nottingham Road; Southwell, Nottinghamshire, NG25 0LG; England; 53°04′21″N 0°57′28″W

Information
- Type: Cathedral school Academy
- Religious affiliation: Church of England
- Established: 1976 (but the two merged schools dated from 956 and 1957)
- Local authority: Nottinghamshire
- Department for Education URN: 145643 Tables
- Ofsted: Reports
- Headteacher: Ben Chaloner
- Gender: Coeducational
- Age: 7 to 18
- Enrolment: 1684
- Alumni: Old Southwellians
- Website: minsterschool.org.uk

The Minster School is a Church of England secondary school with sixth form in Southwell, Nottinghamshire, England, for children aged 7 to 18. There are just under 1700 students on roll. It has a small selective junior section for boys and girls aged 7 to 11, including the choristers of Southwell Minster and other children chosen for their musical ability.

The school was formed in 1976 by a merger of the ancient Southwell Minster Grammar School, with about 250 pupils, and the larger Edward Cludd Secondary Modern School, a recently created secondary modern with about 500. It occupies the former Edward Cludd school site.

In December 2011, Ofsted graded the School as Outstanding in 30 out of 31 areas. Its campus is on Nottingham Road, next to the Southwell Leisure Centre.

== Admissions ==
The total number of pupils on the school roll is around 1700. There are roughly 1240 pupils in the secondary school (Key Stage 3, Years 7, 8, 9, 10 and 11) and some 400 pupils in the Sixth form. The attached Minster Junior School provides free education for some forty pupils spanning Key Stage 2, Years 3, 4, 5 and 6. Some of these children are the choristers of Southwell Minster, while others are also musically gifted. Children from the junior school are automatically allocated a place in the secondary school at Year 7.

The school has a lower than average proportion of pupils on free school meals, of ethnic minority origin, and with a Statement of Special Educational Needs.

== History ==
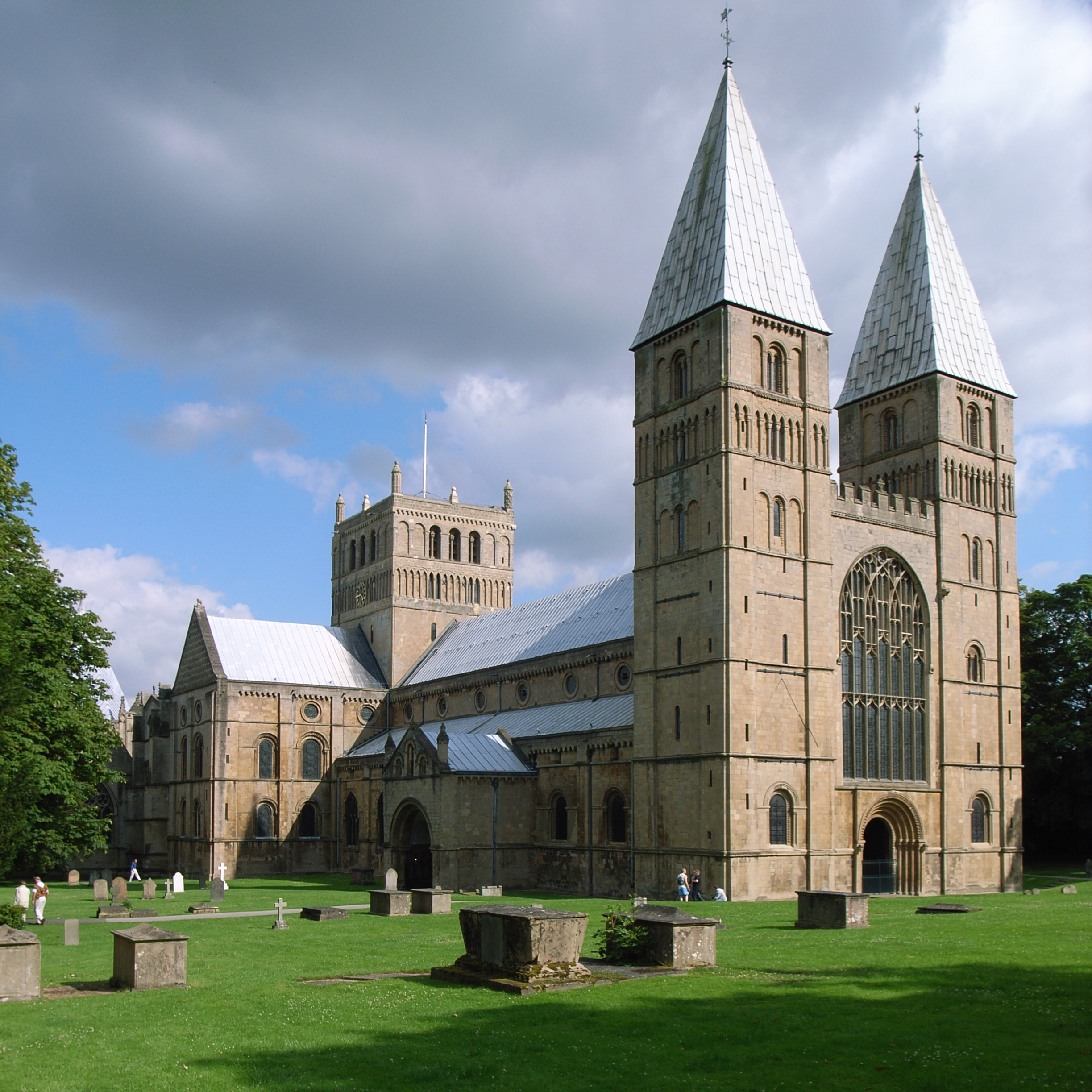
Southwell Minster

The former grammar school was founded in 956 and was one of the oldest schools in England, and the 19th oldest school in the world. From a gift of land by King Edwy to Oscytel, Archbishop of York, about 958, a Chapter, a Church, and a school to teach the singing boys Latin were created. The earliest named schoolmaster, in 1313, was Henry de Hykeling.

A visitation of the grammar school in 1484 noted disapprovingly "They do not speak Latin in school, but English".

In 1547 the churchwardens petitioned Edward VI "that our Grammar School may also stand with such stipend as appertains the like, wherein our poor youth may be instructed" – his Commissioners replied "that the school is very meet and necessary to continue". In 1580 Hugh Baskafield, the Master, was discharged by the Chapter as "he had notoriously slacked and neglected his duties" while William Neep in 1716 ordered the school's rules to be written in English after abolishing the Latin version.

The selective school was known in the early 20th century as Southwell Minster Collegiate Grammar School. The Education Act 1944 gave the school governors the opportunity to seek aided status, and the fund-raising at that time suggested that the grammar school's life would run from 956 A.D. to 2956 A.D. By 1970, this school was called Southwell Minster Grammar School. At the end of that year, Nottinghamshire County Council LEA was proposing to create two comprehensive schools in Southwell, one from the Grammar School and the other from the Edward Cludd School, but local residents petitioned for a single merged school, and Margaret Thatcher, then the Education Secretary, said in parliament that she would take the petitioners' views into account when considering the LEA's and the school governors' proposals.

The Edward Cludd Secondary Modern School (named after Edward Cludd, a local supporter of Oliver Cromwell) was a mixed voluntary controlled school with places for 510 children, which had been established as a new school in January 1957.

In the early 1960s, the grammar school had an intake of only about 35 children each year and was then in Minster Chambers, Church Street, but in 1964 this school site was replaced by another one further down Church Street on the south-eastern side of the Minster, on the site of a Roman Villa. Upon amalgamation, this site, a long way from the Edward Cludd site on Nottingham Road, was difficult to integrate into the life of the much bigger school. The decision was taken to concentrate redevelopment at Nottingham Road, and the Church Street site was sold. This created the opportunity to investigate the Roman villa. After the amalgamation, the new school obtained specialist status in two of the former grammar school's traditional strengths, music and humanities.

An educational charity called Southwell Minster Grammar School was established in 1909 and still exists, now renamed as Southwell Minster School, with the former head teacher Matthew Parris and Moira Hepworth as its trustees.

Previously a privately instituted school, in December 2018 the school converted to academy status.

== Buildings ==
In April 2006, work began on a new £34m school building. On 16 July 2008, Prince Edward, Earl of Wessex officially opened the new school building, in operation since September 2007. The Minster School won the 2009 RIBA Sorrell Foundation Schools Award due to the highly functional design of the school. It no longer has boarding facilities.

== Head teachers ==
- Canon Philip Blinston was executive headteacher of the school for twenty years, also serving as Head of the Magnus School in Newark.
- Mrs White was head teacher until December 2013.
- Mr C. Stevens was acting head teacher between December 2013 and September 2014
- Matthew Parris was head teacher from September 2014 to 2020
- Ben Chaloner, since 2020

== Notable alumni ==
=== Minster School ===
- Andrew Cooney (born 1979), Scout leader and explorer.
- Paul Franks (born 1979), cricketer
- Charles Harrison (born 1974), organist
- Mathew Horne (born 1978), actor and comedian
- William Ivory (born 1964), screenwriter, playwright and actor.
- Tom Ryder (born 1985), rugby player
- Marie Toms (born 1979), former British Waterski champion
- Hayley Turner (born 1983), jockey
- Sian Welby (born 1986), televisiok presenter and columnist

=== Edward Cludd Secondary Modern School ===
- Nigel Savage (born 1950), academic lawyer

=== Southwell Minster Grammar School ===
- Frederick Hutton (1836–1905), scientist
- Philip Brett (1937–2002), musicologist
- Henry Fynes Clinton (1781–1852), classical scholar
- Alvin Stardust (1942–2014), singer
- William Hodgson Barrow (1784–1876), Member of Parliament for South Nottinghamshire
- The Rev. William Williams (1800–1878), bishop
- Vaughan Grylls (born 1943), artist and educationalist
- Harold Cottam (1891–1984), wireless operator for RMS Carpathia on the night of the Titanic disaster

== See also ==
- List of the oldest schools in the United Kingdom
