= Andrew Cooney (explorer) =

British Army officer and youngest person to walk to the South Pole

Captain Andrew Cooney FRGS AFRIN (born 1979), is a British explorer and was the youngest man to walk to the South Pole.

== Early life ==
Born in April 1979 in Buckinghamshire, Cooney grew up at Thurgarton. He joined the Scouts and earned the highest scouting award (the Queen's Scout), later completing the Bronze, Silver and Gold stages of the Duke of Edinburgh's Award Scheme. He was educated at Southwell Minster School, then from the age of sixteen at Southampton Institute, where he studied electronic and computer engineering. He earned a BA (Hons) degree in Maritime Leisure Management.

== Career ==
Cooney became a Scout Leader, and on 3 January 2003, aged 23, he became the youngest person ever to walk to the South Pole. He was commissioned into the British Army's Royal Logistic Corps, Territorial Army, and by February 2007 had been promoted to Captain and was fund-raising in the hope of leading an expedition to the North Pole in March 2008.

Cooney now runs his own business, delivering presentations, workshops, and university lectures around Britain.

== Affiliations ==
- Fellow, Royal Geographical Society
- Associate Fellow, Royal Institute of Navigation
