= Lake Genval =

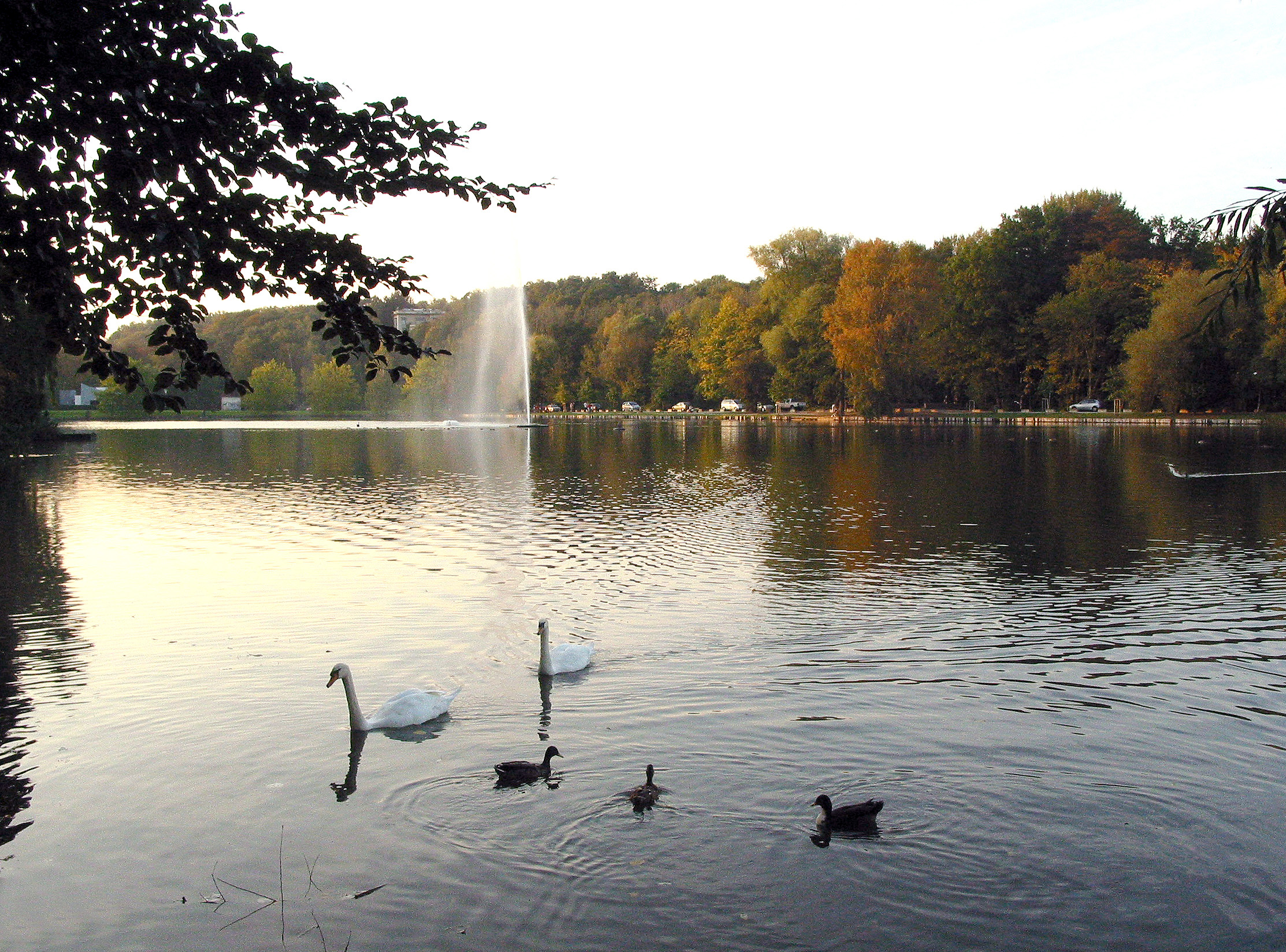

- Location within Belgium
- Coordinates: 50°43′44″N 04°31′10″E
- Type: Freshwater artificial lake
- Basin countries: Belgium
- Max. length: 1 km (0.62 mi)
- Max. width: 0.25 km (0.16 mi)
- Surface area: 18 ha (44 acres)
- Surface elevation: 55 m (180 ft)
- Islands: 1
- Settlements: Rixensart, Overijse

Lake Genval (Dutch: Meer van Genval, French: Lac de Genval) is an artificial lake located in Belgium on the border between Flanders and Wallonia, southeast of Brussels near the Sonian Forest, which is a part of the municipalities of Rixensart, Walloon Brabant and Overijse, Flemish Brabant. A popular vacation and holiday destination, the lake is surrounded by turn-of-the-century homes built during the Belle Époque. Situated on the lake's south is the Château du Lac, a five-star hotel, restaurant, and bar.
