= Rixensart =

Municipality in Walloon Brabant province, Wallonia, Belgium

- Municipality
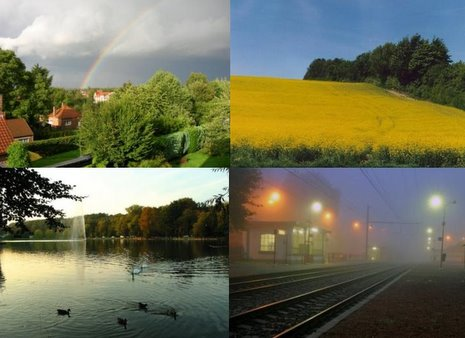

- Flag Coat of arms

- The municipality of Rixensart in Walloon Brabant
- Interactive map of Rixensart
- Location in Belgium
- Coordinates: 50°43′N 04°32′E
- Country: Belgium
- Community: French Community
- Region: Wallonia
- Province: Walloon Brabant
- Arrondissement: Nivelles

Government
  - Mayor: Patricia Lebon (NAP-MR)
  - Governing party: NAP-MR - Solidarix

Area
  - Total: 17.56 km^{2} (6.78 sq mi)

Population (2018-01-01)
  - Total: 22,401
  - Density: 1,276/km^{2} (3,304/sq mi)
- Postal codes: 1330-1332
- NIS code: 25091
- Area codes: 02
- Website: www.rixensart.be

Rixensart (French pronunciation: [ʁiksɑ̃saʁ]; Walloon: Ricsinsåt) is a municipality of Wallonia located in the Belgian province of Walloon Brabant. On January 1, 2018, Rixensart had a total population of 22,401. The total area is 17.54 km^{2} which gives a population density of 1,277 inhabitants per km^{2}.

The municipality consists of the following former municipalities, now districts: Rixensart, Rosières and Genval. Genval-les-Bains is a local beauty spot, a 100-year-old lake with a fountain, and framed by trees, houses and restaurants. Rixensart is home to the beautiful private-owned Château de Rixensart.

Rixensart is served by two railway stations (at Rixensart and at Genval), connecting it with Brussels to the north and Louvain-la-Neuve to the south. The new arrival of the Brussels RER, will improve both train stations and upgrade the number of trains going from Brussels to Namur to 4 per hour. This will also bring more people to the municipality to live. The municipality is now classified as a commuter town due to its proximity to Brussels, the RER and the E411 Motorway.

== Localities ==
- Lake Genval
- Bourgeois is a village located above the valley of the Lasne. It has a church and several small schools.
- Maubroux is a village has a number of small shops, a church and is located near Genval railway station.
- Le Patch
- Froidmont is an old farmhouse, which was until 2010 was a Dominican convent and was garrisoned during the Battle of Waterloo
- Le Glain is a village with a grammar school and a library.
- Genval is a village

== Sports ==
Rixensart is home to Royale Union Rixensartoise football club, founded in 2008 from the merger of three teams. Swimming Club Rixensart is a swimming club. Since September 2017, Rixensart also has his Ultimate Frisbee Team which shows great results in national divisions, trusting the first division in the last years.

== Twin towns ==
Rixensart is twinned with:

- Birstall, Leicestershire, England
- Le Touquet, France
- Winterberg, Germany

== Gallery ==
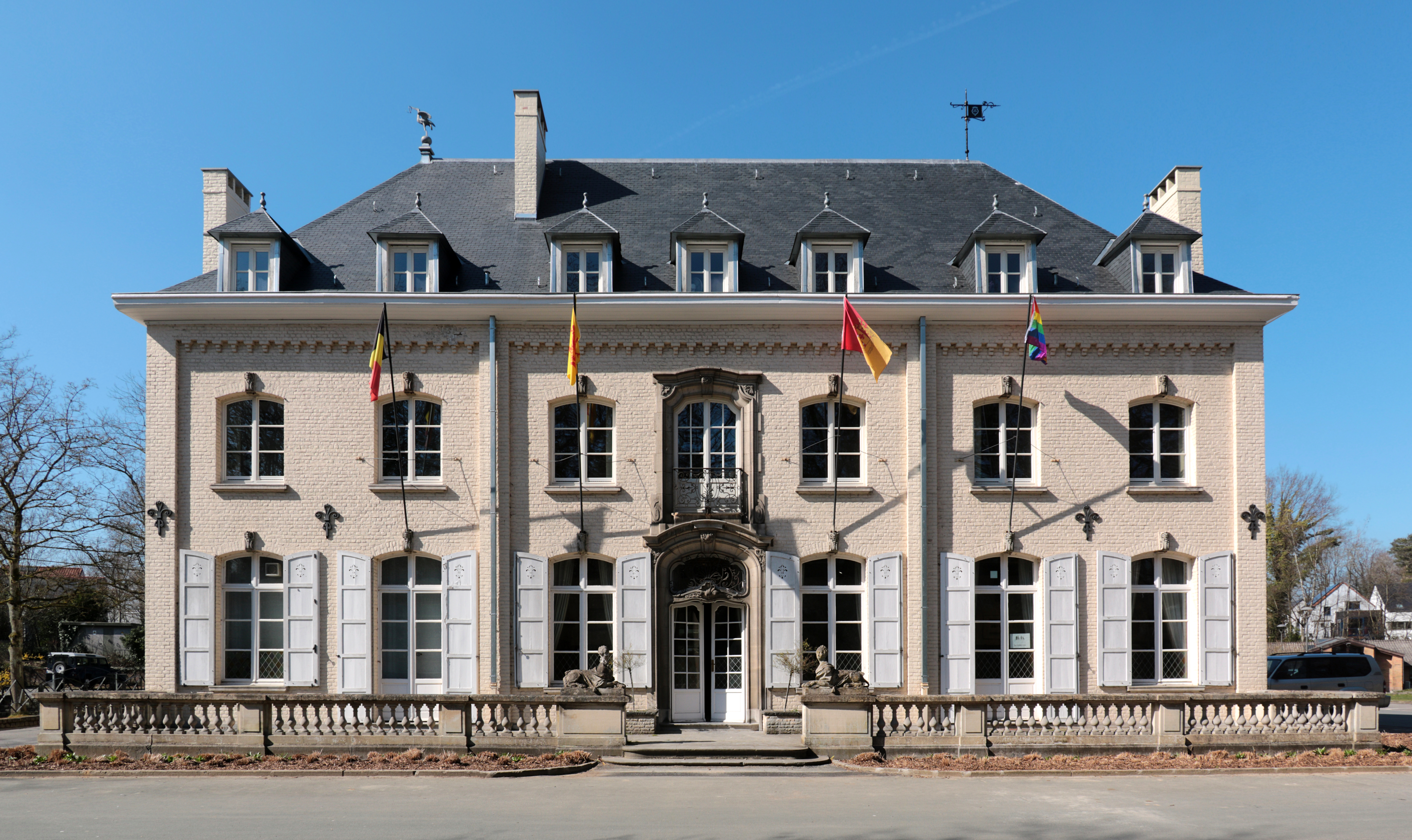
Château du Héron, town hall since 1977

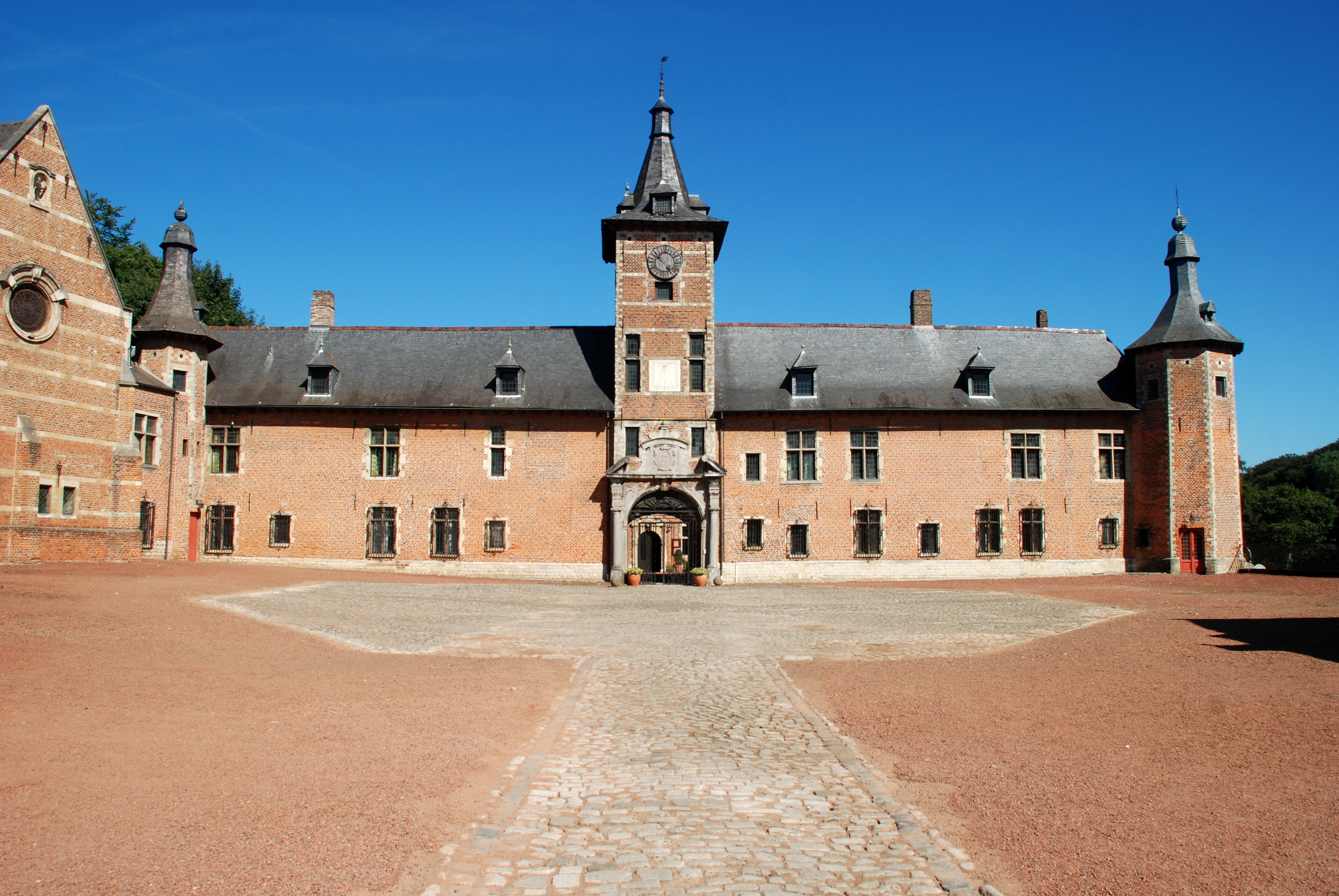
Château de Rixensart

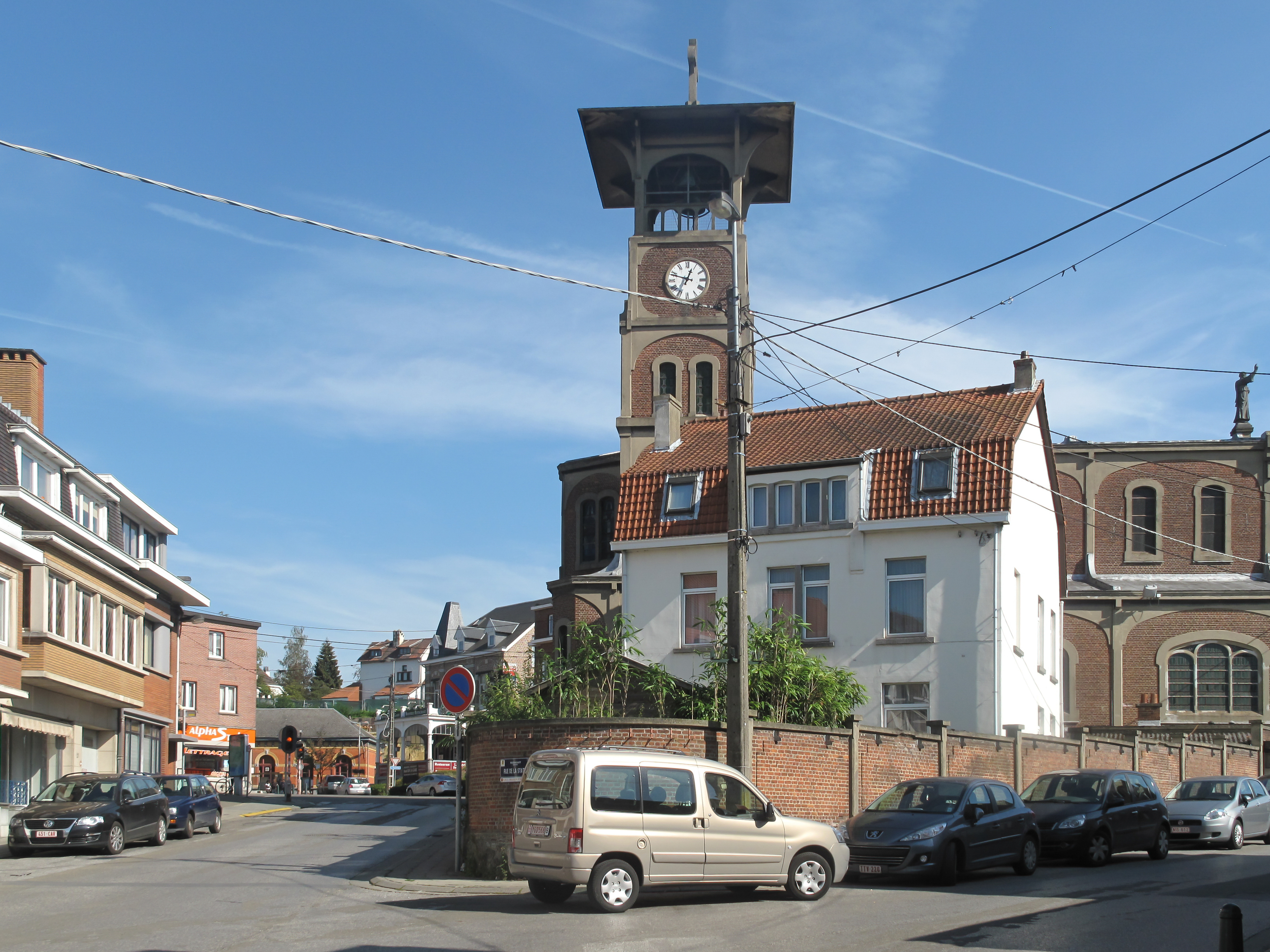
Genval

== See also ==
- Recherche et Industrie Thérapeutiques (RIT)
