= Seseña =

- Municipality
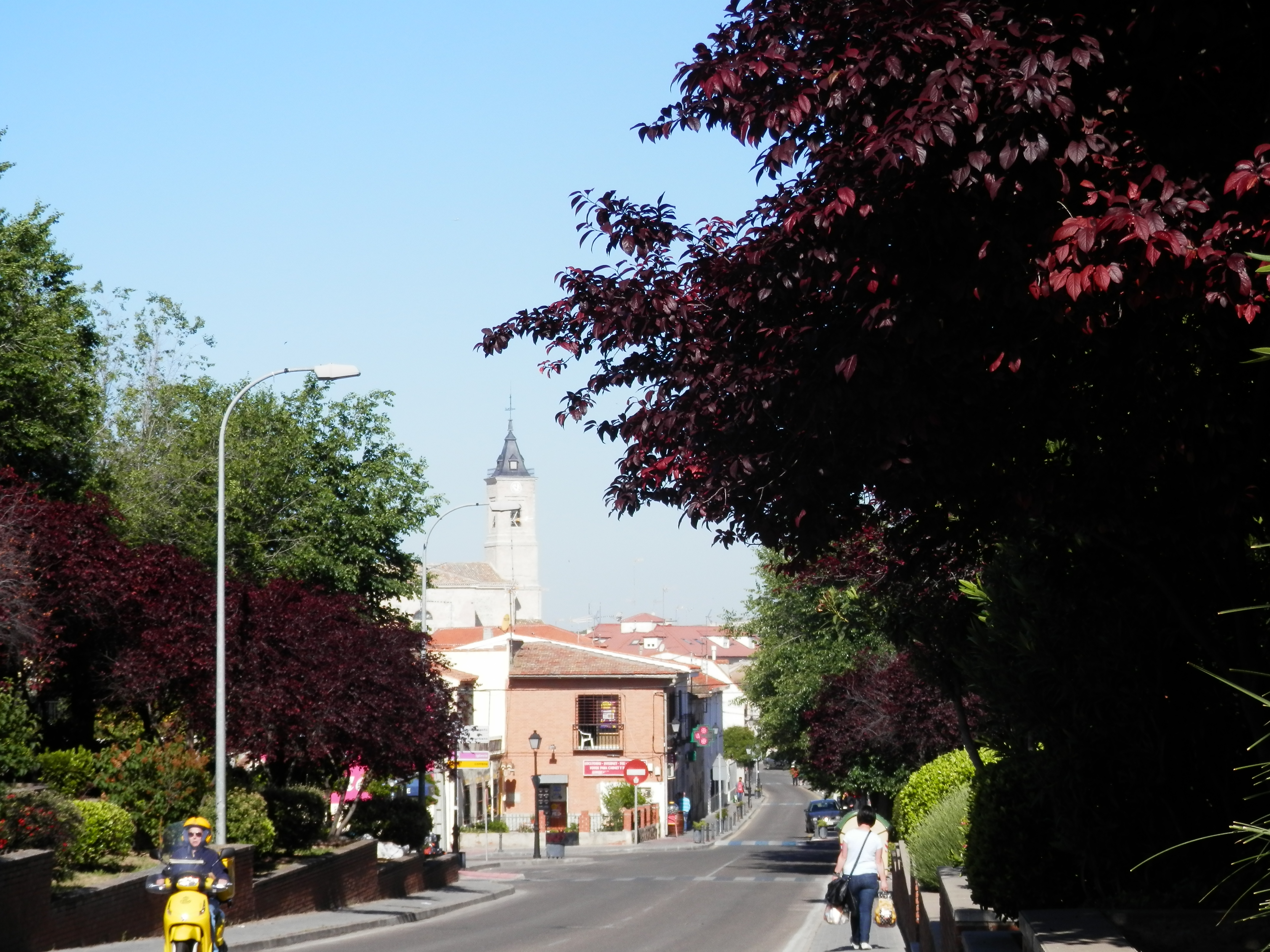

- Flag Coat of arms

- Location in Spain Seseña (Spain)
- Coordinates: 40°6′13″N 3°41′53″W
- Country: Spain
- Autonomous community: Castilla–La Mancha
- Province: Toledo

Government
  - Mayor: Silvia Fernández (PSOE)

Area
  - Total: 71.41 km^{2} (27.57 sq mi)
- Elevation: 598 m (1,962 ft)

Population (2025-01-01)
  - Total: 30,907
  - Density: 432.8/km^{2} (1,121/sq mi)
- Demonym: Seseñero/a
- Time zone: UTC+1 (CET)
  - Summer (DST): UTC+2 (CEST)

Seseña is a municipality of Spain located in the province of Toledo, Castilla–La Mancha. It is part of La Sagra comarca. As of 1 January 2020, the municipality has a population of 27,066.

Seseña gained visibility as a result of controversial speculative development projects in Vallegrande and El Quiñón during the Spanish property bubble. The municipality is nowadays composed of four sectors that are far away from each other and have no footpath connecting them, as is usual in Spanish towns.

== Geography ==
The municipality spans across a total area of 71.41 km^{2}. To the north, the municipality borders the Madrid region. The northern part of Seseña reaches the highest altitude in the municipality, at around 684 metres above mean sea level, while the southern end close to the Jarama and Tagus rivers lies at around 500 metres.

== History ==
The Battle of Seseña was an ill-fated Republican assault on the Nationalist stronghold of Seseña in October 1936 during the Spanish Civil War. The battle is notable for being the first time that tank warfare was seen in the Spanish war and for the use of Molotov cocktails against loyalist Soviet T-26 tanks by Francoist rebel troops.

In May 2016, 9,000 residents of Seseña were ordered to evacuate after a tire fire at a dump produced a toxic cloud.

== Francisco Hernando ==
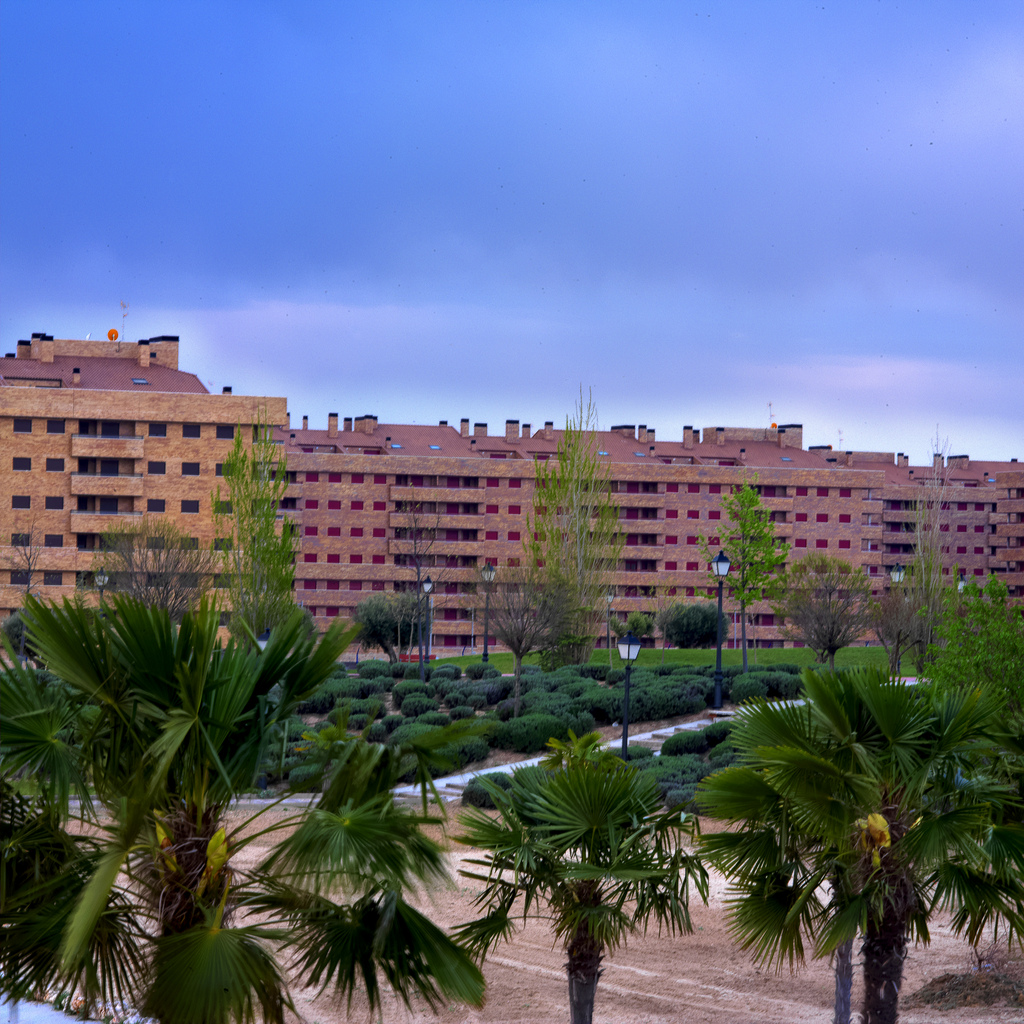
The Residencial Francisco Hernando

The Residencial Francisco Hernando development was built in the El Quiñón area of Seseña by property developer Onde 2000 belonging to the Grupo Francisco Hernando. Begun during the construction boom of the 2000s (decade), due to the municipality's location within commuting distance of Madrid, it was to be one of the largest such developments in Spain, with an original plan of 13,500 units costing over 9 billion euros to build. However, the massive project raised eyebrows. Since utilities such as water and gas lines were not included in the plans, the completed units risked being uninhabitable. Also the project had been approved unusually quickly: it turned out that the authorities had been bribed, and the former local Mayor José Luis Martín was soon arrested, but never brought to trial.

Following scandal and the economic crisis related to the Spanish property bubble, the developer ran into trouble sustaining demand and financing for the project. By mid-2008 fewer than 3000 of the completed apartments had been sold and fewer than a third of the sold apartments were occupied, leaving the development a "ghost town" reminder of Spain's economic woes.

The developer, Francisco Hernando Contreras aka El Pocero, was never criminally charged with wrongdoing and moved his business to Equatorial Guinea. He died on 3 April 2020 of coronavirus disease 2019.

In the context of the boom of logistics experienced in La Sagra (and the spread of the mobile home phenomena in nearby locations such as Carranque, Yeles, Numancia, Illescas, and Yuncos), most of the dwellings in the Residencial Francisco Hernando were inhabited by the early 2020s, and the municipal government thereby unblocked a plan for the construction of more buildings, with the municipality laying out a project in 2022 seeking to build "up until 13,825 dwellings", even more than those 'El Pocero' dreamed of.

Residencial Francisco Hernando is the inspiration and setting for the 2022 novel Lejos by Rosa Ribas, published in English as Far.
