= Trinity Health =

American health system

- Type: Private
- Industry: Health care
- Founded: 2000; 26 years ago
- Headquarters: Livonia, Michigan, U.S.
- Area served: 22 U.S. states
- Key people: Michael Slubowski (president/CEO); James Bentley, Ph.D. (chair, board of directors)
- Services: Hospital management outpatient centers senior living communities home health agencies
- Revenue: US$21.6 billion (2023)
- Operating income: $401.3 million (FY 2018)
- Number of employees: 120,000+
- Website: www.trinity-health.org

Trinity Health is an American not-for-profit Catholic health system operating 92 hospitals in 22 states, including 120 continuing care locations encompassing home care, hospice, PACE and senior living facilities. Based in Livonia, Michigan, Trinity Health employs more than 120,000 people including 5,300 physicians.

Sponsored by Catholic Health Ministries, Trinity Health operates facilities in the US states of Alabama, California, Connecticut, Delaware, Florida, Georgia, Idaho, Illinois, Indiana, Iowa, Maine, Maryland, Massachusetts, Michigan, Nebraska, New Jersey, New York, North Carolina, Ohio, Oregon, Pennsylvania, and South Dakota.

Trinity Health Chicopee is a comprehensive healthcare system that offers a wide range of services to patients in the Chicopee, Massachusetts area. The system includes a hospital, a network of outpatient clinics, and a variety of support services.

== History ==
In May 2000, Trinity Health was formed through a merger between Holy Cross Health System in South Bend, Indiana, and Mercy Health Services in Farmington Hills, Michigan. The new organization initially comprised 25 health ministries across seven states—California, Idaho, Indiana, Iowa, Maryland, Michigan, and Ohio—with 45,000 employees and 7,000 physicians. Trinity Health's headquarters were established first in Farmington Hills, Michigan, and later in Novi, Michigan. At the time, Trinity Health was the 10th largest health system in the nation and the fourth largest Catholic health care system in the country, by total number of hospitals and total bed count, respectively. It operated 47 acute-care hospitals, 432 outpatient facilities, 32 long-term care facilities, and numerous home health offices and hospice programs in 10 states.

In 2013, Trinity Health and Catholic Health East merged into a single organization.

It acquired St. Mary's Hospital in Waterbury, Connecticut in 2015.

For 2018, revenue increased to $18.3 billion. Total assets of $26.2 billion were recorded, with operating income of $401.3 million. As of June 30, 2018, it had 94 acute care hospitals, and reached 22 states. In September 2018, Trinity Health formed Trinity Health Mid-Atlantic with three other hospitals.

Trinity Health held a 50.4% stake in BayCare Health System, until June 27, 2024, when a Definitive Agreement signed between the two transferred $4.0 billion in cash from BayCare and disaffiliated Trinity Health as a corporate member. BayCare assumed full ownership of member hospitals and other facilities previously owned by Trinity Health, St. Anthony's Hospital and the five St. Joseph's hospitals in Tampa, and stated they would maintain their Catholic identity.

== Divisions ==
Trinity Health's divisions are:

- Allegany Franciscan Ministries, Palm Harbor, Florida (foundation)
- Catholic Health, Buffalo, New York
- Holy Cross Health, Silver Spring, Maryland
  - Holy Cross Germantown Hospital, Germantown, Maryland
  - Holy Cross Hospital, Silver Spring, Maryland
- Holy Cross Hospital, Fort Lauderdale, Florida
- Loyola Medicine, Maywood, Illinois
  - Gottlieb Memorial Hospital, Melrose Park, Illinois
  - Loyola University Medical Center, Maywood, Illinois
  - MacNeal Hospital, Berwyn, Illinois
- The Mercy Community, West Hartford, Connecticut (senior community)
- Mercy Medical, Daphne, Alabama
  - Mercy LIFE (Program of All-Inclusive Care for the Elderly)
- MercyOne, Iowa/Nebraska/South Dakota
- Mount Carmel Health System, Columbus, Ohio
- Pittsburgh Mercy, Pittsburgh, Pennsylvania (behavioral health)
- Saint Agnes Medical Center, Fresno, California
- Saint Alphonsus Health System, Boise, Idaho
  - Saint Alphonsus Medical Center - Baker City, Baker City, Oregon
  - Saint Alphonsus Medical Center - Nampa, Nampa, Idaho
  - Saint Alphonsus Medical Center - Ontario, Ontario, Oregon
  - Saint Alphonsus Regional Medical Center, Boise, Idaho
- St. Francis Medical Center, Trenton, New Jersey
- Saint Joseph Health System, Mishawaka, Indiana
  - Mishawaka Medical Center, Mishawaka, Indiana
  - Plymouth Medical Center, Plymouth, Indiana
- St. Joseph of the Pines, Southern Pines, North Carolina (senior community)
- St. Joseph's Health, Syracuse, New York
- Saint Joseph's Health System, Atlanta, Georgia
  - Emory Saint Joseph's Hospital, Sandy Springs, Georgia (operated by Emory Healthcare)
  - Mercy Care
- St. Mary's Health Care System, Inc., Athens, Georgia
  - St. Mary's Good Samaritan Hospital, Greensboro, Georgia
  - St. Mary's Hospital, Athens, Georgia
  - St. Mary's Sacred Heart Hospital, Lavonia, Georgia
- St. Peter's Health Partners, Albany, New York
  - Samaritain Hospital, Troy, New York
  - Samaritain Hospital - St. Mary’s Campus, Troy, New York
  - Sunnyview Rehabilitation Hospital, Schenectady, New York
  - Samaritan Hospital - Albany Memorial Campus, Albany, New York
- Trinity Health Michigan, Ann Arbor, Grand Rapids, Muskegon, and Lakeshore, Michigan
- Trinity Health Mid-Atlantic, Pennsylvania
- Trinity Health of New England, Connecticut and Massachusetts
  - Johnson Memorial Hospital, Stafford Springs, Connecticut
  - Mount Sinai Rehabilitation Hospital, Hartford, Connecticut
  - Mercy Medical Center, Springfield, Massachusetts
  - Saint Francis Hospital & Medical Center, Hartford, Connecticut
  - Saint Mary's Hospital, Waterbury, Connecticut

== Divestitures ==
In 2015, Trinity divested three of their financially struggling facilities to for-profit Prime Healthcare Services. This included St. Joseph Mercy Port Huron Hospital in Port Huron, Michigan, which sold September 2015 in a $37.5 million transaction. Mercy Suburban Hospital, East Norriton Township, Pennsylvania, was sold in March 2015 in a $35 million transaction, and Saint Michael's Medical Center, Newark, New Jersey, was sold to Prime Healthcare in a $62 million bankruptcy sale.

== Ethical and religious directives ==
As a Catholic health care provider, Trinity Health hospitals follow the Ethical and Religious Directives for Catholic Health Care Services issued by the United States Conference of Catholic Bishops. The directives guide health care facilities in making decisions about care and services in a way that is consistent with Catholic beliefs.

The following religious communities provide healthcare through Trinity Health:

- Sisters of the Holy Cross
- Sisters of Mercy of the Americas
  - Mid-Atlantic Community
  - New York Pennsylvania West Community
  - Northeast Community
  - South Central Community
  - West Midwest Community
- Franciscan Sisters of Allegany
- Sisters of Providence of Holyoke
- Sisters of St. Joseph of St. Augustine, Florida
