= Holy Cross Hospital =

Holy Cross Hospital may refer to:

Canada

- Holy Cross Hospital, Calgary, Alberta

United Kingdom

- Holy Cross Hospital, Haslemere, Surrey, England

United States

- Holy Cross Hospital, Nogales, Arizona
- Holy Cross Hospital (Fort Lauderdale), Florida
- Holy Cross Hospital (Chicago), Illinois
- Holy Cross Hospital (Silver Spring), Maryland
- Holy Cross Hospital, Taos, New Mexico
- Holy Cross Hospital (Salt Lake City, Utah), now Salt Lake Regional Medical Center

== See also ==
- Providence Holy Cross Medical Center, Burbank, California
