= William Anderson House =

- U.S. National Register of Historic Places
- Michigan State Historic Site
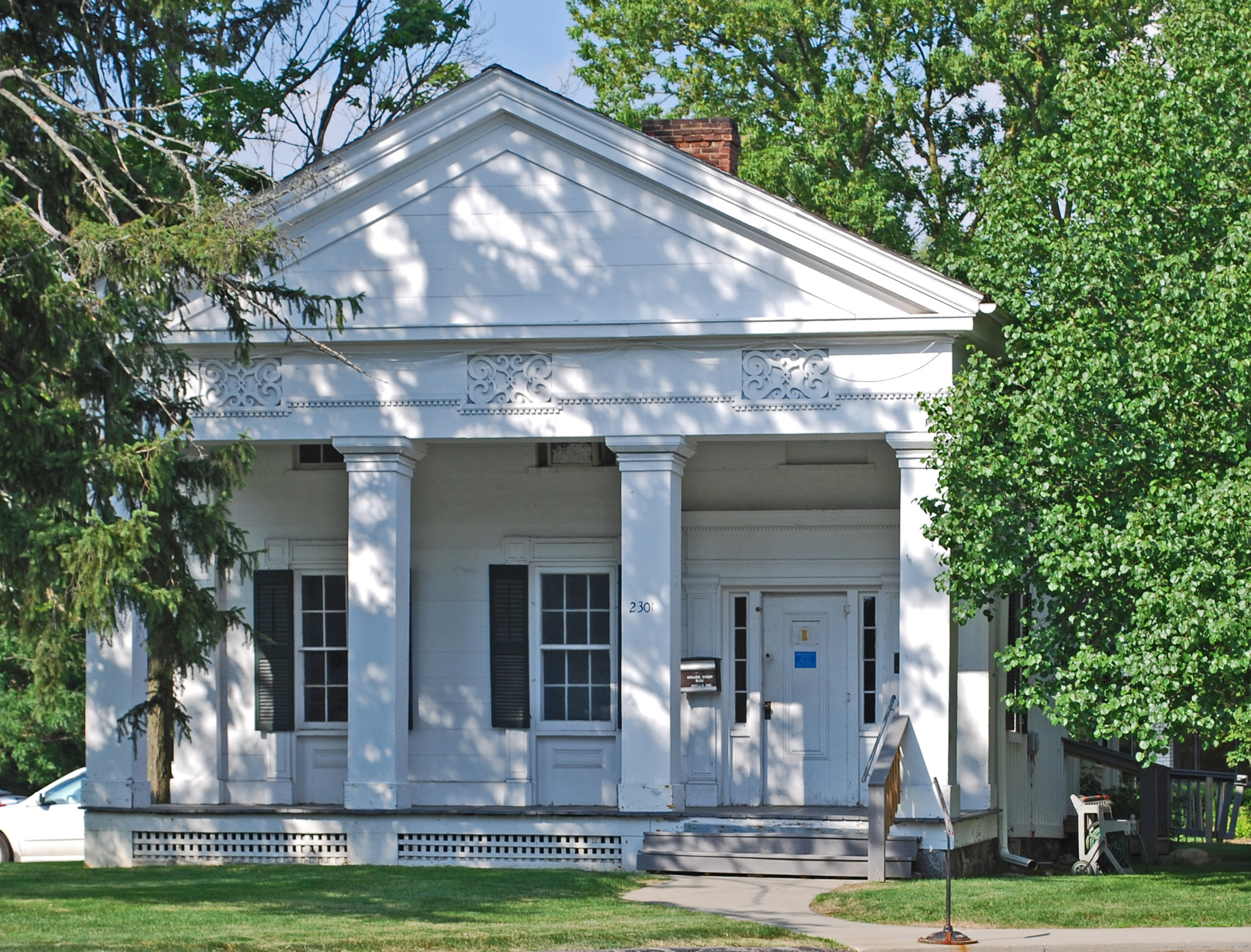
- Front view of the house, 2010
- Interactive map of William Anderson House
- Location: 2301 Packard St., Ann Arbor, Michigan
- Coordinates: 42°15′16″N 83°43′30″W
- Area: 1.3 acres (0.53 ha)
- Built: 1853
- Architectural style: Greek Revival
- NRHP reference No.: 82002884
- Added to NRHP: August 19, 1982

The William Anderson House is a single-family house located at 2301 Packard Street in Ann Arbor, Michigan. It was listed on the National Register of Historic Places in 1983. Built around 1853 for William Anderson, the first Washtenaw County Sheriff, the house is a well-preserved surviving example of Greek Revival architecture in Southeast Michigan. The house is owned by Genesis of Ann Arbor, a joint Jewish-Christian house of worship that has used the Anderson House for its food bank program since 2007.

William Anderson and his descendants lived in the house until the 1930s, when it was foreclosed upon. Dr. Inez R. Wisdom, a graduate of the University of Michigan Medical School, purchased the house in 1937. Wisdom lived in the house with her longtime partner Gertrude L. Griffith, and also operated her medical office there. Wisdom constructed a small chapel on the property in 1941, which expanded into the St. Clare of Assisi Episcopal Church.

The church built a larger building on the grounds in the 1950s, and entered into a unique joint venture with Reform Jewish congregation Temple Beth Emeth in 1974, forming Genesis of Ann Arbor. The Anderson House was then operated as commercial office space from the 1980s until the 2000s, when it became the location of the Back Door Food Pantry, a food bank operated by Genesis of Ann Arbor.

== History ==
=== William Anderson ===
John Anderson was an early settler in Washtenaw County, who may have been associated with Orange County, New York. He purchased two parcels of land on Packard Road in 1831, which was at the time outside the Ann Arbor city limits in Pittsfield Township. His son William Anderson was appointed as the first sheriff of Washtenaw County in 1835. As county sheriff, Anderson developed a rivalry with county probate judge Robert S. Wilson, who he derided in 1838 as "a real sack of wind, a perfect humbug, and a bullying bragadocio." Wilson was similarly unfond of Anderson, who he called "a dastardly coward" the same year. Wilson constructed a grand Greek Revival-style house in downtown Ann Arbor in 1839, the same year that Anderson's term as sheriff ended. Wilson sold his house and moved to Chicago in 1850.

Anderson built the present house on the property around 1853. The house is a similarly grand structure, in Greek Revival style, built on a fieldstone foundation. Its construction used techniques that were common in New York and New England in its era, but rare in Michigan, such as board-and-batten siding. In 1858, Anderson deeded the house and surrounding land to his son, William E. Anderson, who owned the house until his death in 1873. The house passed to his wife Cornelia Foster Anderson (1827-1902), and to their children after her death. In 1932, the house was foreclosed upon, and left the Anderson family.

=== Inez Wisdom ===
Inez Wisdom
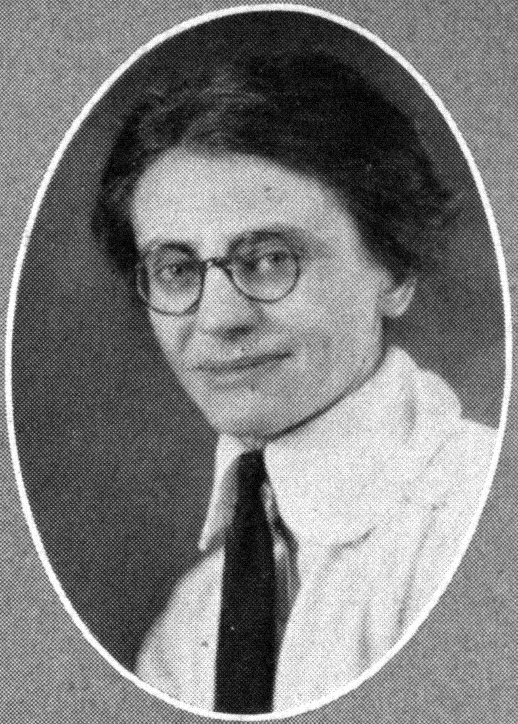
- Wisdom in 1922
- Born: Inez Ruth Wisdom; July 21, 1884; Saline, Michigan
- Died: December 21, 1965 (aged 81); Ann Arbor, Michigan
- Education: Michigan State Normal College; University of Michigan Medical School
- Occupation: Physician

Dr. Inez Ruth Wisdom purchased the house in 1937 for use as a residence and medical office. Wisdom was born in 1884 in Saline, and studied education at Michigan State Normal College, working as a physical education teacher to save money to attend medical school. Wisdom attended the University of Michigan Medical School, graduating in 1923, and interning at the Women's Homeopathic Hospital in Philadelphia. In Philadelphia, Wisdom entered into a relationship with Gertrude Griffith, a registered nurse who had served with the Army Nurse Corps during World War I.

At the conclusion of Wisdom's internship, she and Griffith moved to Sturgis, Michigan, where they opened a private medical practice. Wisdom also joined the medical staff of the new Sturgis Memorial Hospital, which opened in 1925. Wisdom was the only woman of the nine doctors at the hospital, and was elected president of the St. Joseph County Medical Society.

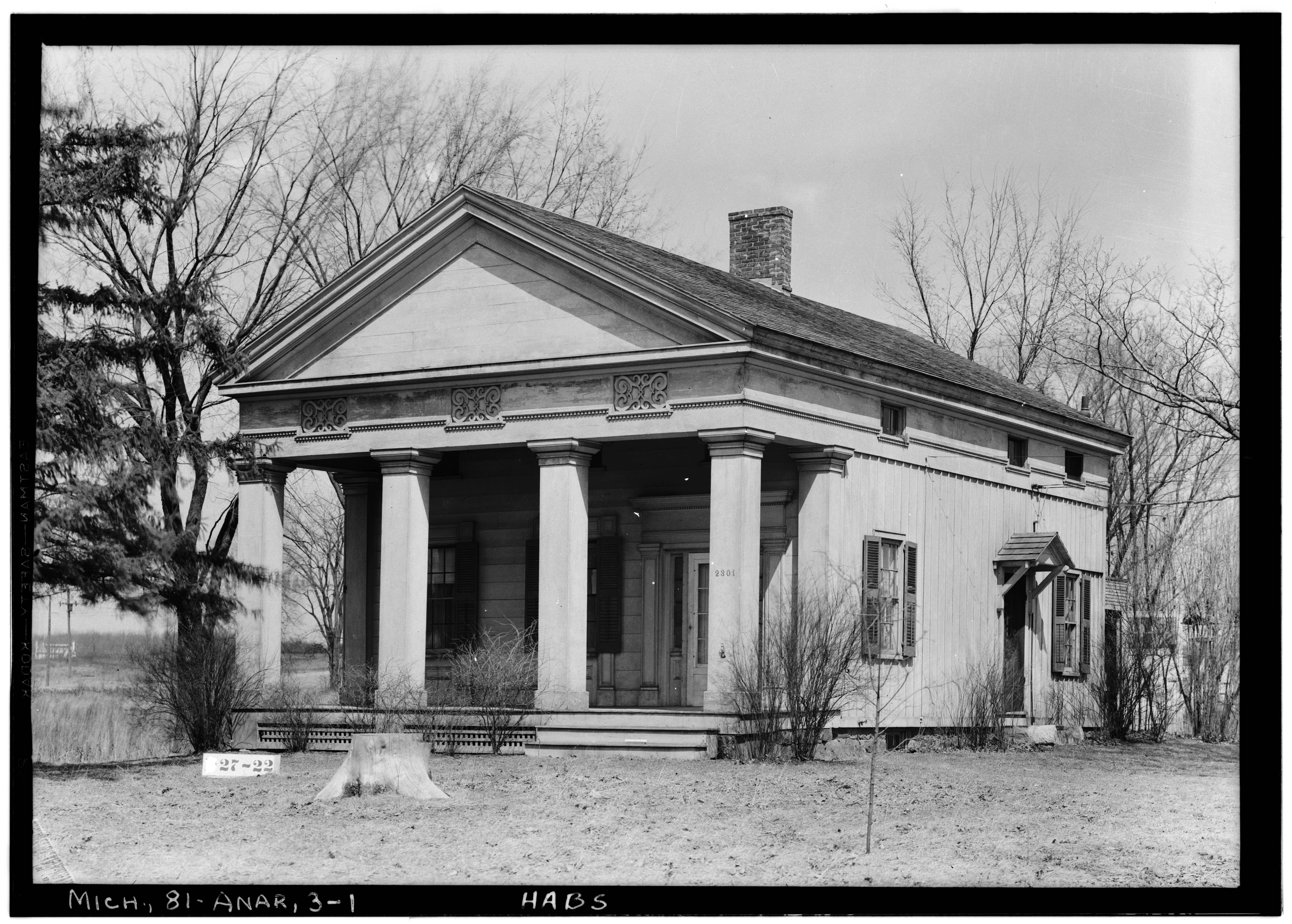
Front view of the house, 1934

Wisdom and Griffith left Sturgis in 1929 following the death of Wisdom's mother, moving back to Saline and later to Ann Arbor, and turning over her private practice in Sturgis to Dr. Nina C. Wilkerson of Springfield, Missouri. Wisdom became the executive director of the Ann Arbor Maternal Health Clinic on North Main Street in 1935, and purchased the Anderson House in 1937 for her residence and medical practice. Wisdom was one of very few doctors in Ann Arbor that dispensed birth control.

In addition to her private practice at the Anderson House, Wisdom also practiced at St. Joseph Mercy Hospital, where she was elected as the president of the St. Joseph Mercy Hospital Medical Society. She later served as the president of the Washtenaw County Medical Society, and was elected a life member of the Michigan State Medical Society in 1955.

Wisdom lived in the Anderson House with her longtime partner Gertrude Griffith, who was made joint tenant of the property in 1945. Wisdom's father Eugene also lived at the house until his death.

Wisdom and Griffith were active members of the Episcopal Church, and traveled widely. During her travels to Europe, Wisdom was inspired to build a small chapel for her personal use in the back garden of her home. The construction of the 10-seat chapel was funded by Wisdom, who accepted construction services in lieu of payment from her patients. Construction of the chapel began in 1940, and it was dedicated in 1941.

=== St. Clare of Assisi Episcopal Church ===
In addition to private worship, Wisdom opened the chapel for weddings and christenings, and a community quickly grew around it. The southern half of the property, including the chapel, was donated to the Episcopal Church in 1953. The 10-seat chapel quickly proved to be too small, and the newly formed St. Clare of Assisi Episcopal Church worshipped in temporary space at the nearby Stone School until 1956, when a larger building was constructed adjacent to the chapel.

Wisdom died in 1965 at the age of 80, and her ashes were interred in the chapel. Griffith inherited the house, and gave it to the church that year. Griffith died in 1987 in New Oxford, Pennsylvania.

=== Genesis of Ann Arbor ===
St. Clare of Assisi Episcopal Church began leasing space to Temple Beth Emeth, a newly formed Reform Jewish congregation, in 1970. The lease grew into an equal partnership of two congregations sharing a house of worship, and Genesis of Ann Arbor was formed as a separate entity to manage the property and facilitate dialogue. St. Clare's 1969-built addition was remodeled to accommodate the needs of two congregations, each with their distinct structures and symbols. The chapel built by Wisdom continued in use exclusively for St. Clare's. A 1994 addition to the Genesis of Ann Arbor building added a similar small chapel for the exclusive use of Temple Beth Emeth.

The Anderson House was not used by either congregation, and by the 1980s it posed a financial burden to Genesis. The house was leased out as commercial office space beginning in 1982, and was occupied by multiple organizations, including a real estate firm and a youth soccer league.

Since 2007, the house has hosted the Back Door Food Pantry, a food bank sponsored by multiple local houses of worship. The Back Door Food Pantry began as a program of St. Clare, and since 2010, has also been supported by Temple Beth Emeth and the Ann Arbor Muslim community.

== Description ==
Front and back elevation of the house

The William Anderson House is a one-and-a-half-story, end gable, Greek Revival house with a gabled rear wing and a later rear shed-roof addition. The house sits on a fieldstone foundation. The front facade has a portico of four square pillars supporting a classical pediment and an entablature. The frieze above is pierced with decorative grilled panels. The house is clad with vertical, board-and-batten siding. The first-floor windows are six-over-six, double-hung units with triple-light eyebrow windows above in the frieze on the sides of the house.
