= Dundee Road =

Dundee Road may refer to:

- Dundee Road (Florida), State Road 542
- Dundee Road (Illinois), Illinois Route 68
