= Genesis of Ann Arbor =

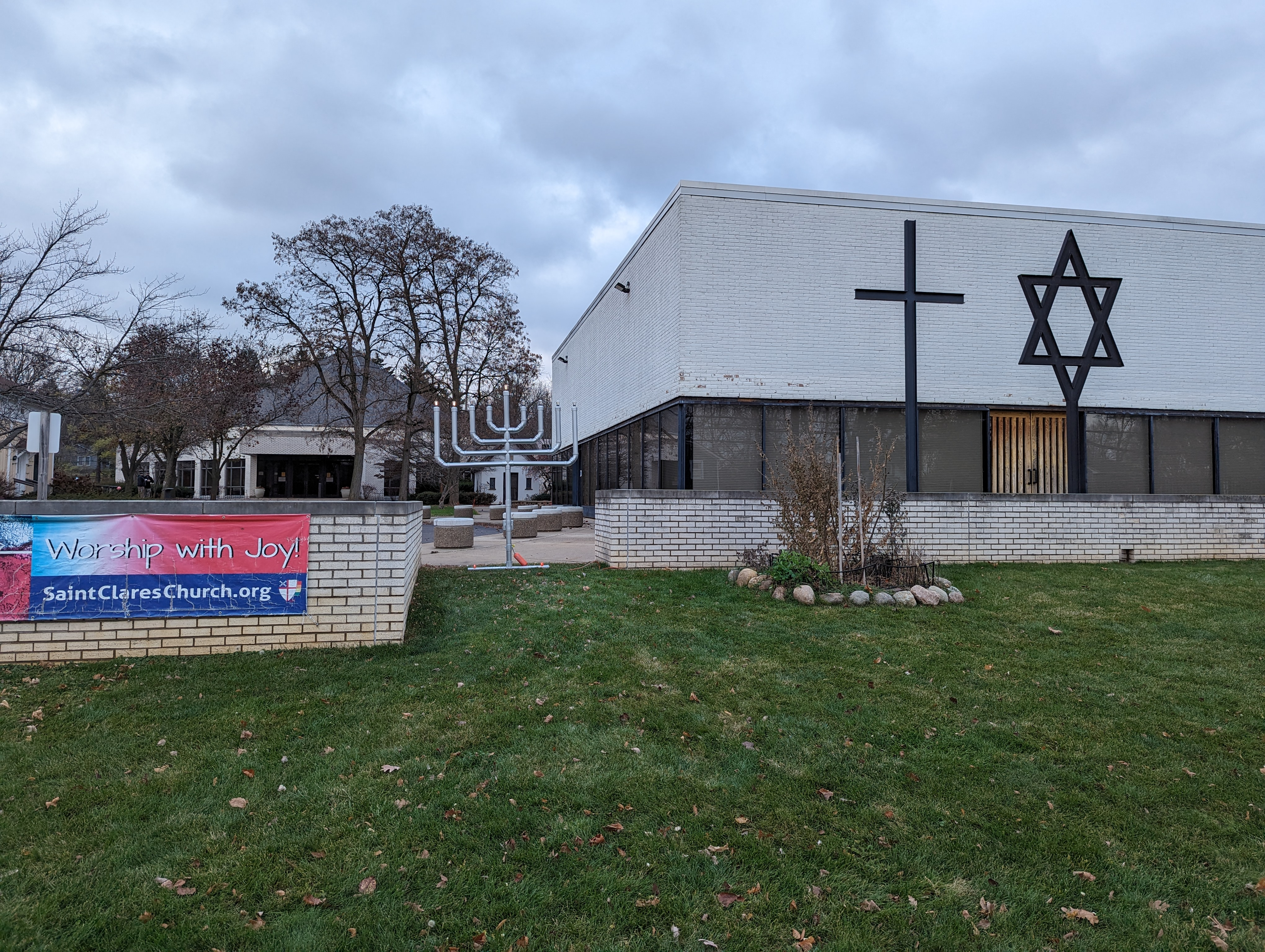

Religion
- Affiliation: Reform Judaism; Episcopal Church

Location
- Location: 2309 Packard St, Ann Arbor, Michigan, United States
- Interactive map of Genesis of Ann Arbor
- Coordinates: 42.2547°N 83.7243°W

Website
- genesisa2.org

Genesis of Ann Arbor is a house of worship in Ann Arbor, Michigan, home to two congregations: an Episcopal church and a Reform Jewish synagogue. Genesis of Ann Arbor was formed in 1974 as an equal partnership of the St. Clare of Assisi Episcopal Church and Temple Beth Emeth, which were founded in 1953 and 1970 respectively. At its founding, the leaders of Genesis of Ann Arbor believed that it was the only equal Jewish-Christian space-sharing arrangement in the world.

Genesis of Ann Arbor was the first such partnership between Christian and Jewish congregations in the United States, and was covered in national media upon its founding as an example of contemporary interfaith dialogue. The two congregations each own half of Genesis of Ann Arbor, a nonprofit organization which owns and maintains the property and facilitates dialogue between the two congregations. St. Clare of Assisi and Temple Beth Emeth each have their own administration, clergy, and worship services, and coordinate some activities, including an annual pulpit exchange between the two congregations' clergy and a joint service for Thanksgiving.

The Genesis of Ann Arbor campus includes a shared sanctuary, which can be configured with the symbols of either faith, or in a neutral configuration. Each congregation also maintains a chapel for its exclusive use. The campus includes the historic William Anderson House, which was built in 1853 and is listed on the National Register of Historic Places. The Anderson House has housed the Back Door Food Pantry, a weekly food bank program, since 2007.

== Organization and campus ==
Genesis of Ann Arbor is a 501(c)(3) nonprofit organization, which owns the shared building. The present-day main sanctuary is shared by both congregations, and can be converted to show the symbols of either religion. Each congregation maintains its own small chapel on the property, and each has its own offices and library in the building. A shared social hall, kitchen, and banquet space support the two congregations' events.

=== St. Clare of Assisi Episcopal Church ===
St. Clare of Asissi Episcopal Church is a parish of the Episcopal Diocese of Michigan. Since 2021, it has been led by the Rev. Anne Clarke.

=== Temple Beth Emeth ===
Temple Beth Emeth is a Reform congregation and a member of the Union for Reform Judaism. Since 2016, it has been led by Rabbi Josh Whinston.

== History ==
=== William Anderson House and Inez Wisdom ===
The oldest building on the Genesis of Ann Arbor campus is the historic William Anderson House, built in the 1850s for Washtenaw County's first sheriff. Anderson's family lost the house in bankruptcy in the 1930s, and it was purchased by Dr. Inez Wisdom in 1937. Wisdom, a 1923 graduate of the University of Michigan Medical School, lived in the house with her partner Gertrude Griffith until Wisdom's death in 1965.

Wisdom constructed a small chapel on her property, modeled after the personal chapels she saw in her travels in Europe. The 10-seat Chapel of St. Francis, built from stucco and measuring only 11 by 22 ft (3.4 by 6.7 m), was dedicated in 1941. In addition to her personal use, Wisdom opened the chapel for weddings and christenings, and a community formed around it. Wisdom donated the chapel and part of her property to the Episcopal Diocese of Michigan in 1953, for the establishment of a new church.

=== Founding of St. Clare's ===
Following Wisdom's donation of the chapel and its property, the Episcopal Diocese of Michigan established a mission church, affiliated with St. Andrew's Episcopal Church in downtown Ann Arbor, and led by the Rev. Philip Schenk. The congregation quickly outgrew the 10-seat chapel, and held services in the garden outside the chapel before moving to leased space at the nearby Stone School. A new church building was built on the Wisdom property, adjacent to the chapel, and opened in 1956. The church gained parish status in 1967, and constructed an addition to the building in 1969.

=== Founding of Temple Beth Emeth ===
Since its founding in 1915, the Ann Arbor Jewish community had been centered on the Beth Israel Congregation, a Conservative synagogue. In early 1966, a group of Beth Israel members, led by University of Michigan professor Ronald Tikofsky, began studying the possibility of establishing a Reform congregation in Ann Arbor. The group settled on the name "Temple Beth Emeth," which translates to "house of truth."

Temple Beth Emeth's first services in August 1966 were led by Rabbi Dr. Richard Hertz of Temple Beth El, Detroit, at the First Congregational Church on William Street. For the next two years, services were led by congregation members and itinerant rabbinical students. In the 1968, Hebrew Union College – Jewish Institute of Religion rabbinical student Bruce Warshal began traveling to Ann Arbor regularly to lead services, and Warshal became the congregation's first rabbi when he was ordained in the summer of 1969.

Temple Beth Emeth's membership grew from 30 families in 1966 to 100 in 1970. In its early years, TBE moved from the First Congregational Church to the First Unitarian Universalist Church, and later to St. Clare's Episcopal Church. The leaders of Temple Beth Emeth intended to eventually build a permanent building for their congregation.

=== Partnership ===
Temple Beth Emeth began renting space from St. Clare's in 1970. The Rev. Doug Evett, rector of St. Clare's from 1972 to 2001, believed that the partnership worked especially well due to the modern design of St Clare's new sanctuary, which was built of brick and glass and featured little Christian symbolism. The partnership grew in the early 1970s, with the establishment of interfaith educational programs and an annual peace-themed Passover Seder.

In 1974, the leadership of St. Clare's formally offered Temple Beth Emeth the opportunity to become partners in a shared building. Genesis of Ann Arbor, the jointly-operated nonprofit handling the building, was incorporated that year. As a condition of the joint operating agreement, Temple Beth Emeth took on some of the financial obligations of the existing building, and agreed to fund a new addition with classrooms and a kitchen. At a dedication ceremony in May 1975, a Star of David was installed next to the existing cross on the outside of the building. The St. Clare's sanctuary was converted for the use of both congregations, with the addition of an ark and the modification of the cross to swing upwards and out of view.

=== New sanctuary and contemporary era ===
Both congregations grew steadily in the late 20th century, and as the 20th anniversary of the partnership neared, Temple Beth Emeth found that it had too little space in the sanctuary for its well-attended High Holy Days services. In the planning process for the expansion, St. Clare's and Temple Beth Emeth developed disagreements about the purpose of a new space. Temple Beth Emeth considered it crucial that the expansion feature a larger social hall, serving the congregation's role as a center of the broader Jewish community.

Ultimately, a major addition to the original building was commissioned, featuring a 450-seat octagonal sanctuary. The new sanctuary continues the concept of shared use and convertible symbols: at the front of the new sanctuary, a series of four doors close open to reveal the ark or the cross, or to conceal both. The new sanctuary was dedicated in time for Temple Beth Emeth's High Holy Days services in the fall of 1994. The original sanctuary was converted to an expanded social hall, for the use of both congregations' events. Temple Beth Emeth's membership was approximately double that of St. Clare's at the time, and the two congregations bore the cost of the expansion proportional to their membership.

St. Clare's maintained the William Anderson House as its own space until the 1980s, when it leased the house as commercial office space to raise funds. The house was home to multiple tenants, including a real estate firm and a youth soccer league, until 2007. St. Clare's began a food bank program in the house in 2007, and the Back Door Food Pantry expanded into a multi-faith initiative in 2010, sponsored jointly by the two Genesis congregations and the Ann Arbor Muslim community.

The two congregations reviewed the agreement between them in 2016, revisiting issues that had grown to cause conflict. Religious pluralism scholar Paul Numrich of the Methodist Theological School in Ohio analyzed the renegotiated agreement in a 2019 paper, and found that members of both congregations found a variety of reasons for the partnership. Numrich argued that despite a sizable minority focused on theological matters, "three-fourths of [his] interviewees (15 of 20) listed practical considerations first, such as finances and facility usage, when asked about the reasons for the Genesis partnership." Genesis of Ann Arbor celebrated its 50th anniversary in 2024.

== Joint programming ==
The two congregations hold their regular worship services separately. Every August, St. Clare's and TBE invite the other's clergy to speak at their regular services in a pulpit exchange, and the two congregations host an annual joint service on the day before Thanksgiving. The congregations jointly sponsor a food bank, the Back Door Food Pantry, which operates out of the William Anderson House.

== See also ==
- History of the Jews in Metro Detroit
