= LUMC =

LUMC may refer to:

- Leiden University Medical Center, in the Netherlands
- Loyola University Medical Center, in Chicago, United States
