= Bond Clinic =

Bond Clinic, P.A.

Geography
- Location: Main campus at 500 East Central Avenue, Winter Haven, Florida 33880, southeast United States, Florida, United States
- Coordinates: Main clinic 28.0219°N 81.7197°W

Organization
- Type: Private, For-profit

History
- Founded: 1948

Links
- Website: www.bondclinic.com

Bond Clinic, P.A. is the largest outpatient clinic system in Winter Haven, Florida. It is one of two large clinic systems in the city, the other being Gessler Clinic, P.A. Bond Clinic has six locations in Winter Haven and one each in Davenport, Lakeland and Sebring, Florida. Patients from a large area use the services of Bond Clinic.

== History ==
Bond Clinic was founded in 1948 by four physicians, one being Dr. Benjamin Bond. The first office was established in June 1949 at the corner of Avenue A N.W. and 3rd Street. On the first floor was a local drugstore and Bond's office was on the second floor. By 1954 the clinic expanded from four to six physicians. At that time a new building was constructed for Bond Clinic on First Street, across from Winter Haven Hospital.

== Expansion ==
In 1978 Bond moved to its current main campus location, which was expanded over the years. The building now there runs the length of the block. In 2007, the clinic opened a satellite location at 199 Avenue B, NW, in downtown Winter Haven. Many services are now housed at that location. Bond opened clinics in several other locations through the years.

== Services ==
Bond Clinic has the following medical providers:

- Doctors of Medicine (M.D.) - 40
- Doctors of Osteopathic Medicine (D.O.) - 2
- Doctor of Physical Therapy - 1
- Nurse practitioners - 7 ARNPs

Bond Clinic offers a large range of outpatient services, including primary care, various radiology services, urgent care and a full-service medical laboratory.

== Clinic locations ==
Bond Clinic lists five locations in its website. These are located at these addresses and geographical coordinates:

- Main Campus - 500 E. Central Avenue, Winter Haven, FL 33880 28.0219°N 81.7197°W
- Pediatrics - 45 Lake Elbert Drive, Winter Haven, FL 33880 28.0216°N 81.7168°W
- Ophthalmology and Vision Center - 506 Avenue A, SE, Winter Haven, FL 33880 28.0208°N 81.7194°W
- Downtown Satellite Office - 199 Avenue B, NW, Winter Haven, FL 33881 28.0244°N 81.7285°W
- First Street Campus & Urgent Care, 325 First Street N, Winter Haven, FL 33881 28.0254°N 81.7273°W
- Lake Wales Office - 1342 State Route 60 East (in the Orange Grove Plaza), Lake Wales, FL 33853 27.8915°N 81.5625°W

The pediatrics and ophthalmology units are adjacent to the main campus, as is the purchasing center, next to the ophthalmology unit. The purchasing center has the following coordinates: 28.0209°N 81.7201°W. The downtown satellite locations contains an anti-coagulation clinic, a diabetes clinic, a satellite laboratory, a physician's practice, an accounting office and the Women's Health Center. The Lake Wales location provides some of the services that are at the Winter Haven locations.

== Ratings ==
The Healthgrades website provides very little information on Bond Clinic. However, the Vitals website provides patient reviews of physicians and wait times for physician visits. Bond Clinic as a whole is not rated by patient reviews. The patient reviews numbered 107 completed surveys as of August 2012. The reviews gave the doctors at the Clinic three of four possible stars. The overall wait time to see a physician at the Clinic, as provided by the patient reviews as of August 2012, was seventeen minutes. The national average wait time was twenty-one minutes.
