= John Couris =

Healthcare Professional

John Couris is a healthcare professional who has served as the president and chief executive officer of Tampa General Hospital since September 2017.

== Education and career ==
Couris is a graduate of Boston University and Lesley University in Cambridge, Massachusetts, where he obtained a Master of Science Management. In January 2019, John began his Doctor of Business Administration at the University of South Florida Muma College of Business. He went on to hold positions at Massachusetts General Hospital and Morton Plant North Bay Hospital, part of the BayCare Health System in Tampa Bay, Florida. Couris serves on the boards of the Florida Hospital Association, the Safety Net Hospital Alliance of Florida, the Tampa Bay Partnership, the Valspar PGA Tournament, Loggerhead Marinelife Center and The Honda Classic.

== Tampa General Hospital ==
Couris joined Tampa General Hospital in September 2017. Tampa General Hospital (TGH) is a 1,010-bed teaching hospital in downtown Tampa Florida. It is located on Davis Islands. Tampa General Hospital has about 8,000 team members, works in partnership with the USF Health Morsani College of Medicine, and has one of three burn centers in Florida. Tampa General Hospital is a level one trauma center, with a five-helicopter fleet, serving 23 counties.

== Jupiter Medical Center ==
Couris joined Jupiter Medical Center in May 2010. Jupiter Medical Center is a not-for-profit, 327-bed regional medical center consisting of 207 private acute-care hospital beds and 120 long-term care, sub-acute rehabilitation and Hospice beds. Founded in 1979, the hospital has approximately 1,500 team members, 575 physicians and 640 volunteers. During Couris' tenure, Jupiter Medical Center opened a $46 million expansion, established a new pediatric wing and forged a partnership with Mount Sinai New York.

== Awards ==
Couris has received several accolades for his work in the healthcare sector, including Top 10 "Ultimate CEO" in Palm Beach County, "Power Leader in Healthcare" in 2014, 2015, and 2016 and Healthcare Professional of the Year in 2014.

== Personal life ==
Couris was born and raised in Boston, Massachusetts, and now resides Tampa, Florida, with his wife and two children.
