= Lake Silver (Winter Haven) =

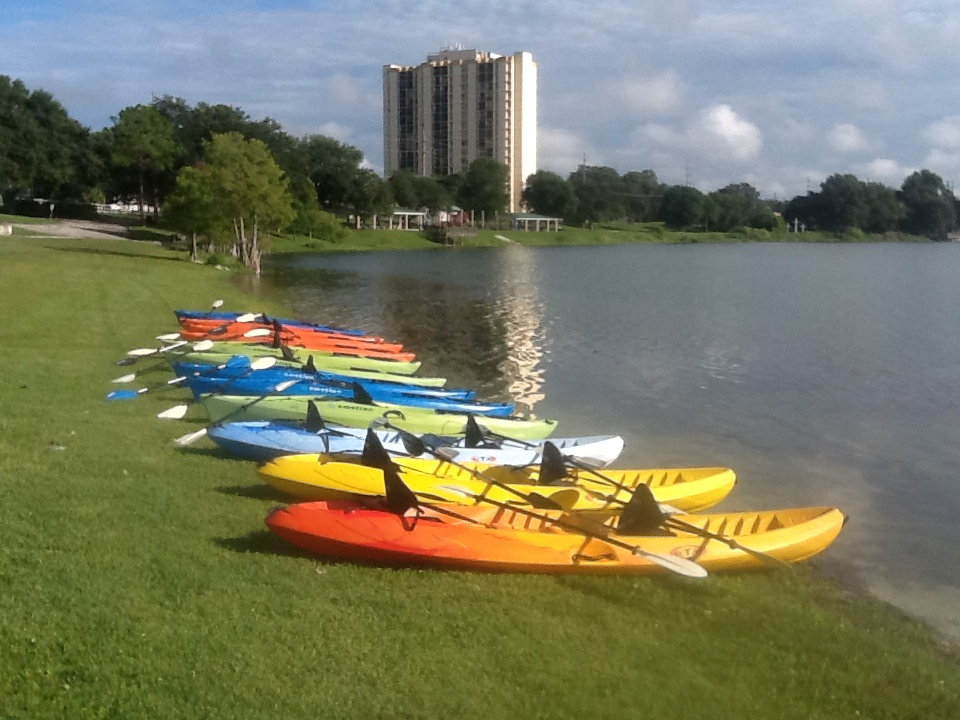
- A row of kayaks on the coast of Lake Silver

- Location within Florida
- Location: Polk County, Florida
- Coordinates: 28.0320°N 81.7287°W
- Type: natural freshwater lake
- Basin countries: United States
- Max. length: 1,920 feet (590 m)
- Max. width: 1,660 feet (510 m)
- Surface area: 51.73 acres (21 ha)
- Surface elevation: 144 feet (44 m)
- Settlements: Winter Haven, Florida

Lake Silver is a natural freshwater lake located in central Winter Haven, Florida. This lake has a 51.73-acre (209,300 m^{2}) surface area and is completely surrounded by offices, clinics, and residential areas. The lake, almost circular in shape, is surrounded on three sides by North and South Lake Silver Drive. Lake Silver Drive on the east side is also part of 1st Street North (SR 549). Lake Silver is surrounded by public land on all but its south and northwest shores. On the east side, 1st Street is only about 10 feet (3.0 m) away. On the north, North Lake Silver Drive is about 20 feet (6.1 m) away. On the entire west and southwest sides is parkland. Directly across 1st Street, to the southeast, is the Winter Haven Hospital campus. Beyond the housing to the south and across South Lake Silver Drive is the main campus of Gessler Clinic.

Lake Silver has one public boat ramp directly next to the Lake Silver Amphitheater. It has no public swimming areas, but since it is surrounded by so much land, fishing may be done there. The parkland on the west and southwest shores of the lake has its own attractions that enhance the recreational value of the lake. The park has shelterhouses for picnics. On the west side a combination paved golf cart, bicycle, and walking trail skirts the lake. This trail travels a considerable distance north and south of Lake Silver.

Lake Silver is one of the deepest natural lakes in all of Central Florida. Despite its rather small size compared to neighboring lakes, such as Lake Howard, which get approximately 11–12 feet (3.4–3.7 m) deep, Lake Silver measures a deep 45 feet (14 m) in some areas of the lake.
