= St. Joseph's Hospital (Tampa, Florida) =

- BayCare Health System

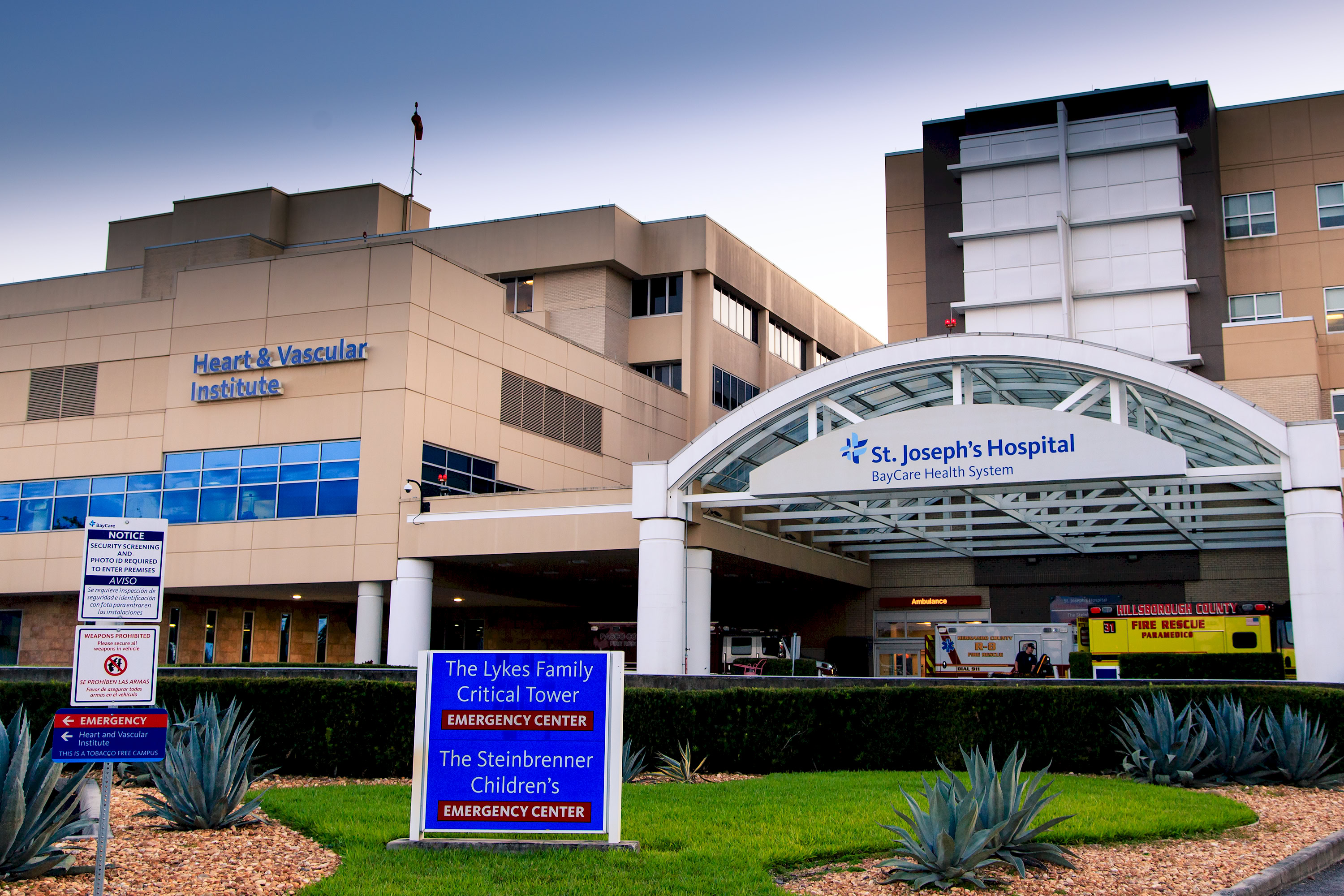
- Entrance to the Emergency Center at St. Joseph's Hospital

Geography
- Location: 3001 W. Dr. Martin Luther King Jr. Blvd., Tampa, Florida, United States
- Coordinates: 27°58′55.24″N 82°29′29.80″W

Organization
- Care system: Private
- Type: Community
- Religious affiliation: Roman Catholic
- Affiliated university: None

Services
- Emergency department: Level II Adult Trauma Center / Level II Pediatric Trauma Center
- Beds: 615

Helipads
- Helipad: FAA LID: FL38
Number	Length		Surface
Number	ft	m	Surface
H1	80	24	Concrete
H2	40	12	Concrete

History
- Constructed: 1963
- Opened: 1934

Links
- Website: stjosephstampa.org
- Lists: Hospitals in Florida

St. Joseph's Hospital is a private, not-for-profit 615-bed community hospital in Tampa, Florida. It was founded by the Franciscan Sisters of Allegany in 1934, and was part of the Franciscan Sisters of Allegany Health System alongside St. Anthony's Hospital in neighboring St. Petersburg. Both became part of the BayCare Health System in July 1997.

The St. Joseph's Emergency Center claims to be the busiest in Tampa Bay, with 74,790 ER visits in 2023, and is a Level II trauma center.

== History ==
Tampa Heights Hospital, March 1933, prior to acquisition by the Sisters

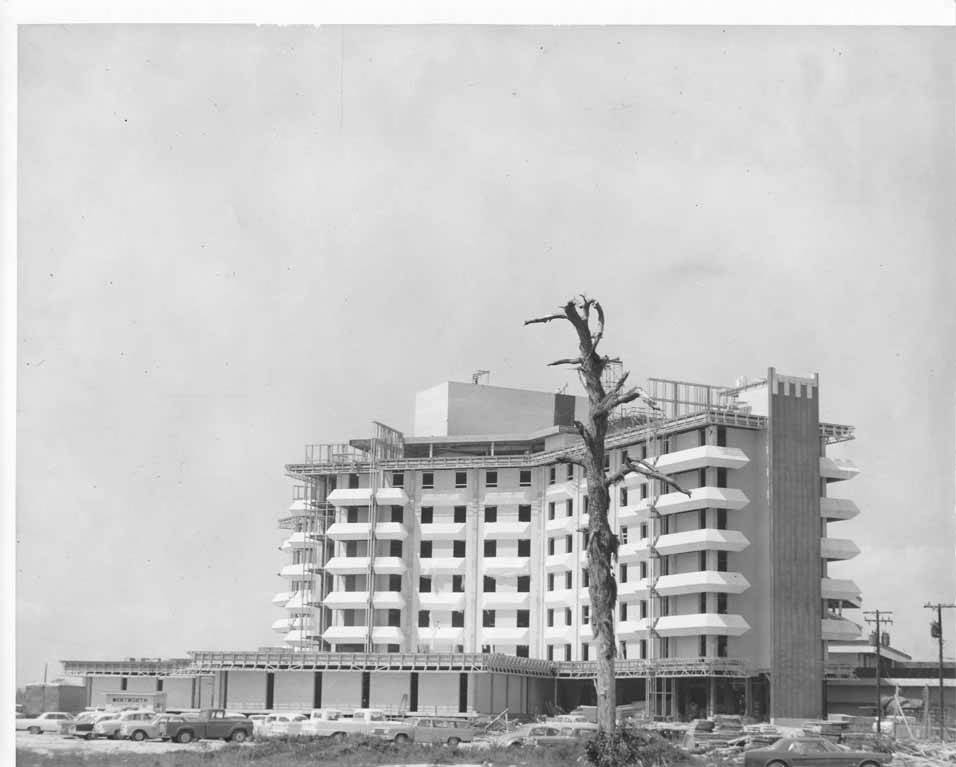
St. Joseph's Hospital, under construction, undated

The hospital was originally opened in July 1932 by Dr. W. H. Dyer as Tampa Heights Hospital who operated the 1st and 2nd floors as a clinic.

It was acquired by the Franciscan Sisters in the Fall of 1933. A $150,000 renovation followed, with a modern fourth floor suite of operating rooms, x-ray rooms, a pharmacy, morgue, and doctors’ quarters added, with the finished facility said to be capable of accommodating 100 patients. The refurbished hospital, located at the corner of Morgan Street and 7th Avenue, was relaunched as St. Joseph's Hospital on October 1, 1934.

The current location opened on March 19, 1967, on what was then known as Buffalo Avenue.
