= Winter Haven Hospital =

- BayCare Health System

Geography
- Location: Winter Haven, Polk County, Florida, United States
- Coordinates: 28.0287°N 81.7254°W

Organization
- Type: non-profit hospital
- Affiliated university: None

Services
- Beds: 527

History
- Founded: 1926

Links
- Website: http://www.winterhavenhospital.org
- Lists: Hospitals in Florida

Winter Haven Hospital is a hospital and health service system based in Winter Haven, Florida. The hospital is managed and supported by the Winter Haven Hospital Foundation—a 501(c)3 nonprofit organization—and is owned by BayCare Health System, a group of 16 not-for-profit hospitals in the Tampa Bay Area. The Winter Haven Hospital system includes the hospital proper, the Community Blood Center, the Winter Haven Women's Hospital, the Winter Haven Ambulatory Surgery and Diagnostic Center, the Center for Behavioral Health, and seven Family Health Centers in Winter Haven and surrounding communities.

== History ==
Winter Haven Hospital was founded in 1926. The original building was located on Avenue C NE. A new building at 223 7th Street was dedicated in September 1928 by hospital physicians and community leaders and opened in 1930.

A new hospital facility was constructed at the location of the current main campus in 1937. The facility has undergone many expansions and remodelling projects over the years. These include the building of the nine-story "Swann" building in 1967, the "Street" building in 1972, and the "Arnold" building in 1975. A$40 million, 60,000-square-foot addition to the front of the Swann building was opened in 2008, adding new surgical facilities, a new cardiac step-down unit and a cardiac rehabilitation center to the Bostick Heart Center as well as a new lobby and improved access to the Cassidy Cancer Center. The 2008 addition followed the completion of a 112,000-square-foot, 300-space parking garage in November 2006; the foundation of the garage was built to support two additional levels (for a total of 5 levels) which may be added in the future.

Winter Haven hospital has also expanded into specialty centers at its main campus. A cancer treatment center opened in 1978 and hospital's Cassidy Cancer Center—in affiliation with the University of Florida College of Medicine—began seeing patients in 2009. In 1999, the $13 million Winter Haven Ambulatory Surgery & Diagnostic Center opened above the emergency department to streamline serviced to patients coming to the hospital for ambulatory (outpatient) surgeries and procedures. The Bostick Heart Center was established in 2005 to provide emergency, elective, and rehabilitative heart care and is the only facility in eastern Polk County capable of performing open-heart surgery. A Stroke Center was established at the hospital to provide critical care and rehabilitative services to persons who suffer a stroke, in which outcome is very time-sensitive; the Stroke Center was certified by the Joint Commission as an Advanced Primary Stroke Center in 2006—the first such facility in the Polk, Highlands, and Hardee County area.

The hospital system also expanded to facilities outside the main campus. Winter Haven Women's Hospital was completed in 1987 at 101 Avenue O, S.E., roughly 1 mile (1.6 km) south of the main campus along 1st Street. The Women's Hospital is a 61-bed specialty hospital providing maternity and maternity related, surgical care for women and infants. In 1995 the hospital acquired space at the Gil Jones complex, which is currently used for business/administrative operations. The hospital branched out into providing primary care service at seven Family Health Centers established in Winter Haven and surrounding communities. The hospital opened the Center for Behavioral Health—in the "Sweet Centre"—in 1990 to provide outpatient psychiatric and counseling services. The hospital also provided mental health services in Sebring at the Marge Brewster Center until the facility was transferred to the Peace River Center in 2010.

Winter Haven Hospital became the eleventh hospital to join the not-for-profit BayCare Health System effective 30 August 2013. The hospital had sought for years to find a not-for-profit new owner as it struggled financially.

According to Enterprise Florida, Winter Haven Hospital is the fourth-largest private sector employer in Polk County, with 2,500 employees. In 2003 the hospital had 527 licensed beds and it maintained this number as of 2012.

== Main campus ==
The main campus of Winter Haven Hospital is dominated by the main hospital building oriented north–south along property wedged between 1st Street North and Lake Martha. The hospital address is 200 Avenue F N.E., although the campus fronts and is primarily accessed from 1st Street North (State Road 549). The main campus provides services typical of a large hospital, such as intensive care units, emergency services, general and specialized patient floors, various types of outpatient services, and educational and conference facilities. In front of the hospital is a large parking garage and lot parking is in front of part of the hospital, as well as across 1st Street (to the west of the hospital). An outpatient center is just north of the main building and a helipad is on top of the northeast section of the main building. Various other parking lots and service and administrative buildings complete the makeup of the campus.

The Community Blood Center's main center is just south and across the street from the main hospital building.

For many years the hospital had a pediatrics unit, but it was finally closed about 2011.

Lake Martha borders the campus to the east and 1st Street is on the west. Various physician offices and medical clinics are in the vicinity of Winter Haven Hospital. Gessler Clinic is the largest of these and is across 1st Street from the hospital. Lake Silver is to the hospital's northwest.

== Services elsewhere ==
Winter Haven Hospital has a number of operations outside the main campus. One is the Gill Jones campus. The Gill Jones campus is a very large office complex (40,000 square feet (3,700 m^{2})) that was obtained in 1995. The street address of Gill Jones is 3425 Old Lake Alfred Road, Winter Haven. Gill Jones was once home to an insurance company headquarters. Since Winter Haven Hospital obtained it, it has served as a warehouse for hospital equipment and supplies. Other entities other than the hospital have had offices there. As of 2012, Gill Jones also houses a Polk County circuit court. Gill Jones is in north Winter Haven, at geographical coordinates 28.0577°N 81.7344°W .

Winter Haven Women's Hospital is about 1 mile (1.6 km) south of the main hospital at the intersection of 1st Street South and Avenue O SE. The street address of Regency is 101 Avenue O SE, Winter Haven. It is at geographical coordinates 28.0087°N 81.7262°W . With sixty-one inpatient beds, this is the system's women's and infant's hospital. Its construction was completed in 1987. It is where expecting mothers go to deliver, since the main hospital has not had a maternity ward for many years.

The Community Blood Center, which has its main center on the main campus, has a satellite location at Room 128, Deeley Hunt Building, Lake Wale Medical Center, Lake Wales, Florida.

Winter Haven Hospital has seven Family Health Centers, which are hospital affiliated primary care physician offices. Two of these centers are located in Winter Haven. The others are located in area towns: Auburndale, Bartow, Dundee, Haines City and Lake Wales. All these locations are inside Polk County, Florida.

Winter Haven Hospital and University of Florida began their robotics and urology program in 2010. The Robotics Institute and Center for Urology moved to their new location in the former Verizon building on Avenue B in downtown Winter Haven on 17 September 2012. Dr. Sijo Parekattil is director of the Institute and specializes in robotic microsurgery, chronic testicular pain, and infertility. His partners include Dr. Kevin Lee and Dr. Matt Oommen and robotic surgery fellow Dr. Jamin Brahmbhatt.

== Ratings ==
Two websites provide rating data for Winter Haven Hospital. Both websites use data from publicly available sources. The Hospital-Data.Com website provides summary data from more than 300 completed patient surveys. In this survey patients were asked whether they would recommend the hospital to family or friends. The results are:

- Definitely – 70%
- Probably – 24%
- No – 6%

The Health Grades website provides data on eleven patient safety indicators. This website provides various types of data from public sources for hospitals throughout the United States. For this hospital the rating of patient safety indicators found four indicators worse than average, seven average and one better than average.
