= Saint Joseph Mercy Health System =

- Trinity Health

Organisation
- Network: St. Joseph Mercy Health System

History
- Founded: 1911

Links
- Website: stjoeshealth.org

Saint Joseph Mercy Health System (SJMHS) was one of the largest health care networks based in southeast Michigan, United States. It was founded in 1911 and existed until 2022, when it merged with Mercy Health to form Trinity Health Michigan.

Prior to the merger, St. Joseph Mercy Health System consisted of five prime hospitals, nine urgent care centers, and five health centers spread around metro Detroit, providing health care in six counties that include Livingston, Macomb, Oakland, St. Clair, Washtenaw, and Wayne.

== Foundation ==
In 1911, four Sisters of Mercy arrived in Ann Arbor from Dubuque, Iowa. They came at the invitation of local medical and religious leaders who dreamed of founding a community hospital to serve area residents. That dream became a reality on November 21, 1911, when the Sisters opened St. Joseph's Sanitarium, a small hospital located in a former student rooming house at the corner of State and Kingsley streets.

The little hospital had a nine-member medical staff and 17 beds on the second and third floors, including eight private rooms. Surgeons operated on the first floor, then carried their patients up the stairs to their rooms above. In its first year, 243 patients were admitted.

By 1914, St. Joe's had moved to a new facility on Ingalls Street. In 1977, the hospital relocated to its present location on East Huron River Drive in Superior Township.

== Hospitals ==
Hospital	City, County	Trauma Center Classification	Number of Beds
Trinity Health Ann Arbor	Washtenaw	Adult: Level I Peds: N/A	537
Trinity Health Oakland	Pontiac, Oakland	Adult: Level II Peds: N/A	443
Trinity Health Livonia	Livonia, Wayne	Adult: Level II Peds: N/A	304
Trinity Health Livingston	Howell, Livingston	Adult: Level IV Peds: N/A	136
Chelsea Hospital	Chelsea, Washtenaw	Adult: Level IV Peds: N/A	113

== IHA Health Services ==
Merging in 2010, IHA Health Services is a wholly owned subsidiary of St. Joseph Health System. IHA is the largest, fully integrated physician group practice in southeast Michigan, with approximately 70 practice locations and 650 providers.
