= Mease Dunedin Hospital =

- BayCare Health System

Geography
- Location: 601 Main Street, Dunedin, Florida, United States
- Coordinates: 28.013402°N 82.783007°W

Organization
- Care system: Private
- Affiliated university: None

Services
- Beds: 120

Helipads
- Helipad: FAA LID: FA04; Aeronautical chart and airport information for FA04 at SkyVector
| Number | Length | | Surface |
| Number | ft | m | Surface |
|---|---|---|---|
| H1 | 45 | 14 | Concrete |

History
- Constructed: 1933
- Opened: 1937

Links
- Website: baycare.org/mdh
- Lists: Hospitals in Florida

Mease Dunedin Hospital is a 120-bed hospital in Dunedin, Florida. It features an ER department, a Psychological Department under the Florida Mental Health Act, and has four floors.

== History ==
=== Early history ===
Dr. Jack Mease purchased a 10-acre plot of land at Milwaukee Avenue and Virginia Street from the Dunedin City Commission at the behest of Dunedin's residents who requested he build a hospital in their town during the Great Depression. Construction on Mease Dunedin Hospital began in 1933 and was completed on April 18, 1937. Most of the construction workers were Mease's own patients who worked on the hospital in order to pay off their debts.

I was 35 then, and I wasn't afraid of anything. We had saved a little money, and I had some insurance and I borrowed some money. Somehow, we came up with $7,500 and, in 1933, we started to build.

We started the hospital by excavating the basement. We had a driver, a team of mules and a slip pan. Businessmen in Clearwater predicted we wouldn't even finish the basement...

— Dr. John Andrew Mease, "Mease Hospital product of a dream" (FEB 24, 1969), according to Theresa Blackwell's Pinellas History column in the St. Petersburg Times

=== Present day ===
Mease Dunedin underwent a significant expansion project from 2008 to 2012. In 2009, a new Critical Care Unit was opened at the hospital, and in 2010, the new ambulatory care unit and sterile processing department were opened. In May 2012, the surgical operating rooms were renovated to better fit the equipment required for "complex orthopedic and spine procedures." The new operating rooms were more than twice as large after the expansion.

== BayCare Alliant Hospital ==
On March 11, 2008, the first floor of Mease Dunedin Hospital became BayCare Alliant Hospital, a 48-bed long-term acute care hospital-within-a-hospital.
