= Morton Plant Hospital =

Coordinates: 27.9527538°N 82.8034223°W

- BayCare Health System

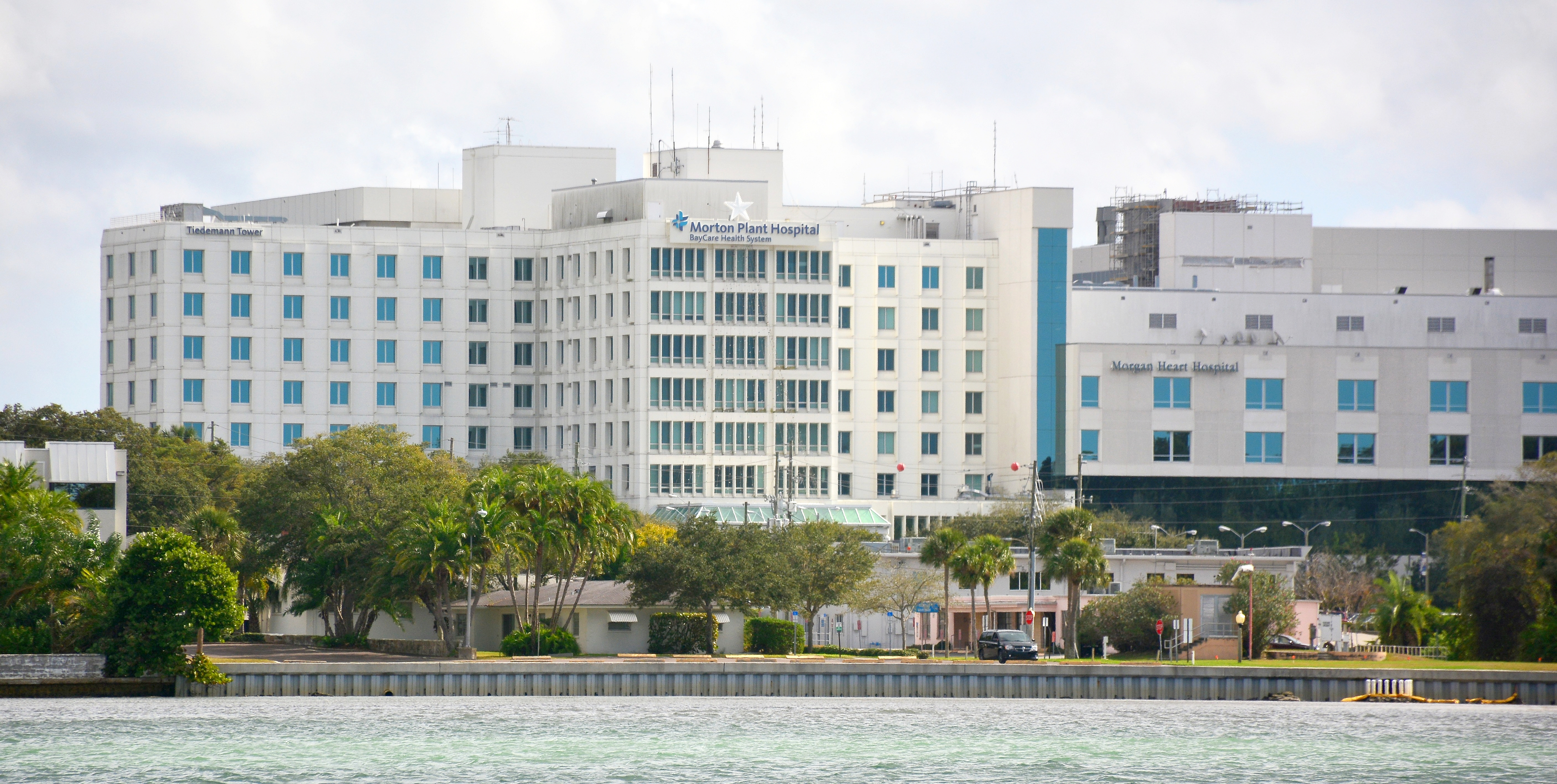

Geography
- Location: 300 Pinellas Street, Clearwater, Florida, United States

Services
- Emergency department: Yes
- Beds: 687

History
- Founded: 1916

Links
- Website: http://www.mortonplant.org
- Lists: Hospitals in Florida

Morton Plant Hospital is a 687-bed hospital in Clearwater, Florida. Established in 1916, Morton Plant Hospital provides services in more than fifty specialty areas. It is part of the greater BayCare Health System.

== History ==
Morton Freeman Plant was the son of Henry Bradley Plant, founder of the Plant System of railroads, steamships, and associated hotels. In 1905, Morton F. Plant built a second home in the then-small town of Clearwater, near the Belleview Biltmore hotel established by his father. He maintained a mansion in New York City at the corner of Fifth Avenue and 52nd Street. In 1912, while on vacation, Plant's son was injured in a car accident and required medical attention. However, there was not a hospital in Clearwater and to get the help, Plant used his railroad connections to have a surgical team brought down by rail from Chicago along with a special surgical car. Afterwards, Plant pledged money for the building of a hospital in Clearwater, with the city coming up with the other half.

The site chosen was one of the high bluffs, unique in peninsular Florida, overlooking Clearwater Bay. The main hospital building faces west toward the Intracoastal Waterway, the barrier islands, and the Gulf of Mexico.

The current main building, known as the Witt Pavilion, was constructed in 1966. Other facilities include the 1941 Pavilion, the Barnard Pavilion, the Adler Pavilion, the Sarah Walker Women's Center, the Morgan Heart Hospital, the Cantonis building which houses the emergency room, the Day Surgery Pavilion, the Ptak Orthopaedic and Neuroscience Pavilion, the Madonna Ptak Rehabilitation Center, the Axelrod Pavilion, the Cheek-Powell Heart and Vascular Pavilion, the Powell Cancer Center, and the Lykes Pavilion. The Morgan Heart Hospital replaced the Roebling building, which was demolished in 2005. The new Axelrod Pavilion incorporated the former Carlisle Imaging facility.

== See also ==
- List of hospitals in Florida
