= Saint Mary's Hospital (Waterbury) =

Coordinates: 41.5531°N 73.0368°W

- Trinity Health of New England

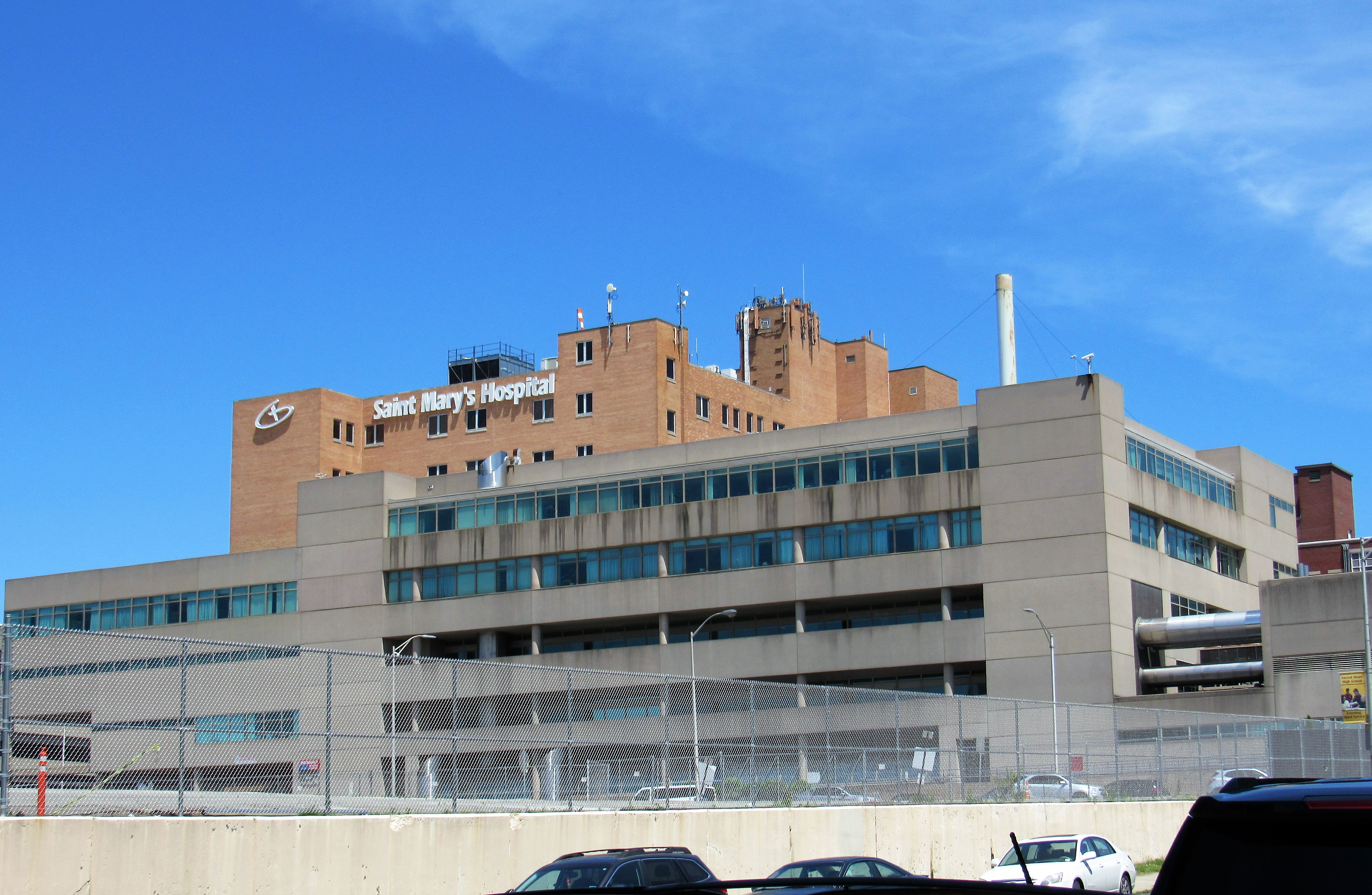

Geography
- Location: 56 Franklin Street, Waterbury, Connecticut, United States

Organization
- Type: General
- Affiliated university: Yale School of Medicine

Services
- Beds: 347

Helipads
- Helipad: FAA LID: 1CT3
Number	Length		Surface
Number	ft	m	Surface
H1	65	20	Asphalt

History
- Founded: 1907

Links
- Website: www.trinityhealthofne.org/location/saint-marys-hospital
- Lists: Hospitals in Connecticut

Saint Mary's Hospital (abbreviated STMH) is a Yale-affiliated urban hospital located at 56 Franklin Street, Waterbury, Connecticut. Operated by Trinity Health, it was founded in 1907 by the Sisters of Saint Joseph of Chambéry and is designated as a Level II trauma center. Saint Mary's has been a teaching hospital for the Yale University School of Medicine for over 40 years.

== History ==
In 2011, Waterbury Hospital and Saint Mary's Hospital said they planned on merging. The merger between Saint Mary's Hospital and Waterbury Hospital was called off in 2012.

In July 2014 Tenet Healthcare announced that the hospital would be acquired by a Tenet subsidiary, with the hospital's religious directives and uncompensated care policies remaining intact. Tenet was chosen by the hospital after a four-year selection process. The Tenet deal unraveled in 2015 when Tenet expressed concern with the conditions on the sale set by the state of Connecticut.

In September 2015, Saint Mary's Hospital was acquired by Livonia, Michigan-based Trinity Health, who had recently acquired Saint Francis Hospital & Medical Center in Hartford. In 2018, Trinity Health opened a center for multiple sclerosis treatment and research at the hospital.

== Hospital rating data ==
The HealthGrades website contains quality data for Saint Mary's Hospital as of 2016. For this rating section three different types of data from HealthGrades, 9 or 10 are the two highest possible ratings. Percentage of patients rating this hospital as a 9 or 10 - 67%.
