= BayCare Health System =

American health system in Florida

BayCare
- Type: Nonprofit organization
- Industry: Healthcare
- Founded: July 1, 1997
- Headquarters: Clearwater, Florida, United States
- Number of locations: 15 hospitals (2024)
- Area served: Florida
- Key people: Stephanie Connors (President/CEO):2022-present
- Revenue: ▲US$5.5 billion (2023)
- Total assets: 7,895,171,196 United States dollar (2022)
- Website: www.baycarepharmacyresidency.com

BayCare Health System is a nonprofit organization headquartered in Clearwater, Florida, that operates 15 hospitals across Florida. In 2023, it was the third largest hospital network in Florida.

== History ==
=== Early history ===
BayCare can trace its roots to the CareFirst Health Network, a PPO network formed in 1995 by seven not-for-profit hospitals in Tampa Bay, with contracts with four others, which replaced SunHealth Care Plans-Gulf Coast:

- Bayfront Medical Center
- St. Anthony's Hospital
- All Children's Hospital
- St. Joseph's Hospital
- St. Joseph's Women's Hospital
- University Community Hospital
- University Community Hospital-Carrollwood
- Mease Countryside Hospital
- Mease Dunedin Hospital
- Morton Plant Hospital
- South Florida Baptist Hospital

By August of that year, it had been renamed BayCare Health Network Inc. due to trademark issues, and several member hospitals began withdrawing from other competing PPOs. In 1996, the 14-hospital BayCare Health Network hired The Hunter Group in the face of increasing competition with Columbia/HCA's 14-hospital Tampa Bay Health System. William Anderson, president and CEO of South Florida Baptist Hospital at the time, expressed the possibility of a merger, and unnamed sources at BayCare "said the options range from forming a holding company with the hospitals retaining individual assets and partial autonomy to a full merger among some or all of the facilities." Membership in either managed-care network was not necessarily exclusive, as All Children's Hospital was a member of both. The Hunter Group presented BayCare with a 700-page report proposing a merger between 17 not-for-profit hospitals.

In July 1997, acting on The Hunter Group's report, BayCare Health System was formed as a 50-year pact and joint operating agreement. Bayfront-St. Anthony's Health Care in St. Petersburg, Morton Plant Mease Health Care in Dunedin, and St. Joseph's-Baptist Health Care in Tampa formed BayCare as a seven hospital network, with Mease's two hospitals initially excluded due to a 1994 antitrust settlement regarding parent Morton Plant Mease. The corporate parties to the JOA included Allegany Health System, owner of St. Anthony's and St. Joseph's, Morton Plant Mease, Bayfront, and South Florida Baptist Hospital.

- Bayfront Medical Center
- St. Anthony's Hospital
- St. Joseph's Hospital
- St. Joseph's Children's Hospital
- St. Joseph's Women's Hospital
- Morton Plant Hospital
- South Florida Baptist Hospital

In March 1998, Morton Plant Mease Health Care Inc. began to manage North Bay Hospital in New Port Richey, before acquiring it entirely from Tenet Healthcare in a June 1999 transaction.

=== 2000–2009 ===
On October 23, 2000, over a controversy with the City of St. Petersburg regarding abortions, BayCare members voted 3–1 to remove Bayfront from the alliance, with South Florida Baptist Hospital, Morton Plant Health Care, and Catholic Health East voting to remove Bayfront. Bayfront was the only vote against. St. Anthony's Hospital had previously consolidated its obstetrics department with its long time partner Bayfront in May 1999, with Bayfront-St. Anthony's CEO Sue Brody stating at the time that no changes would come to Bayfront's willingness to perform sterilization or "medically necessary" abortion procedures. Shortly thereafter in July, BayCare head Frank Murphy announced that roughly 10 abortions per year that were allowed at Bayfront in the past were now considered disallowed due to Catholic restrictions. This prompted inquiry from the St. Petersburg City Council in September, as Bayfront leased much of its property from the city, as well as a federal lawsuit filed by the City of St. Petersburg against Bayfront and BayCare on March 30, 2000. Bayfront filed its own lawsuit against the City of St. Petersburg the following day, and a second lawsuit was filed against BayCare, Bayfront, and the City of St. Petersburg by the ACLU and other civil rights groups on August 16, 2000. The partnership between Bayfront and St. Anthony's was formally dissolved on December 31, 2000.

In November 2000, BayCare signed a letter of intent with All Children's Hospital to "create and jointly operate a not-for-profit children's healthcare system", amidst rumors the hospital may join BayCare. The All Children's Health System would've provided healthcare to children at BayCare's hospitals, including Tampa Children's Hospital at St. Joseph's but the deal was scrapped less than one year later citing cost issues.

In April 2005, Morton Plant and Mease announced plans to finalize the merger they originally attempted in 1994, which the United States Department of Justice had initially blocked before limiting it in scope, and then reinvestigated in 1998. The Department of Justice eventually allowed the Morton Plant Mease merger to close later that year by filing no objections, fully combining the boards of Morton Plant Mease Health Care, Mease Health Care and the Morton Plant Hospital Association. This allowed Mease Countryside Hospital and Mease Dunedin Hospital to fully combine their operations with Morton Plant's two hospitals after their ten-year partnership allowed them to share certain aspects of their planning and staffing. Mease's two hospitals joined BayCare's network, bringing their total number of hospitals up to 9.

Mease's two hospitals agreed to stop performing elective abortions at their facilities after joining BayCare. This left former BayCare member Bayfront Medical Center as the only hospital in Pinellas County that would, less than five years after they themselves broke ties with BayCare due to their conflict with the City of St. Petersburg over abortions.

=== 2010–2019 ===
The groundbreaking event for St. Joseph's Hospital-South was held in Riverview, Florida on October 17, 2012. The hospital opened on February 2, 2015.

=== 2020–present ===
BayCare broke ground on a $246 million, 86-bed, 318,000-square foot hospital in Pasco County in December 2020. On March 7, 2023, it opened as its 16th hospital, BayCare Hospital Wesley Chapel. BayCare revealed construction plans for BayCare Hospital Manatee in northern Manatee County on April 3, 2024, with construction scheduled to begin in October and plans to open by 2027. BayCare's 17th hospital will be Manatee's first non-profit hospital, as its other three hospitals are owned by for-profit corporations.

On June 30, 2024, the original 50-year joint operating agreement that created BayCare was superseded by a permanent and "simplified corporate legal structure" with no intended changes to BayCare's current operations. Allegany Health System, the Catholic owner of both St. Joseph's and St. Anthony's, announced plans to merge with Providence Health Systems and Eastern Mercy Health System to form Catholic Health East shortly before BayCare Health System was formed in 1997, with that merger taking place in 1998. Catholic Health East itself merged with and became part of Trinity Health in 2012, as a result Trinity Health held a 50.4% stake in BayCare, until June 27, 2024, when a Definitive Agreement signed between the two transferred $4.0 billion in cash from BayCare and disaffiliated Trinity Health as a corporate member. By restructuring, BayCare assumed full ownership of hospitals and other facilities previously owned by its members, including Morton Plant Mease's hospitals as well as South Florida Baptist Hospital. BayCare stated that the former Trinity Health hospitals in their network, St. Anthony's and the five St. Joseph's hospitals, would maintain their Catholic identity.

== Hospitals ==
BayCare Hospitals
Photo	Hospital	Beds	Location	Opened	Joined	Helipad	Notes
	Bartow Regional Medical Center	72	Bartow, Florida	1925	2015	Aeronautical chart and airport information for 1FL7 at SkyVector	
	BayCare Alliant Hospital	48	Dunedin, Florida	2008	2008		Long-term acute care hospital-within-a-hospital at Mease Dunedin
	BayCare Hospital Wesley Chapel	86	Wesley Chapel, Florida	2023	2023	Aeronautical chart and airport information for 7FL2 at SkyVector	
	Mease Countryside Hospital	387	Safety Harbor, Florida	1985	2005	Aeronautical chart and airport information for 36FL at SkyVector	
	Mease Dunedin Hospital	120	Dunedin, Florida	1937	2005	Aeronautical chart and airport information for FA04 at SkyVector	
	Morton Plant Hospital	599	Clearwater, Florida	1916	1997	Aeronautical chart and airport information for 06FL at SkyVector	
	Morton Plant North Bay Hospital	222	New Port Richey, Florida	1965	1999	Aeronautical chart and airport information for 6FA6 at SkyVector	
	South Florida Baptist Hospital	147	Plant City, Florida	1953	1997	Aeronautical chart and airport information for 02FL at SkyVector	
	St. Anthony's Hospital	448	St. Petersburg, Florida	1931	1997		
	St. Joseph's Children's Hospital	219	Tampa, Florida	1990	1997		Formerly Tampa Children's Hospital
	St. Joseph's Hospital	615	Tampa, Florida	1934	1997	Aeronautical chart and airport information for FL38 at SkyVector	
	St. Joseph's Hospital-North	210	Lutz, Florida	2010	2010	Aeronautical chart and airport information for FA70 at SkyVector	
	St. Joseph's Hospital-South	223	Riverview, Florida	2015	2015	Aeronautical chart and airport information for 58FA at SkyVector	
	St. Joseph's Women's Hospital	100	Tampa, Florida	1974	1997		
	Winter Haven Hospital	447	Winter Haven, Florida	1926	2013	Aeronautical chart and airport information for 60FD at SkyVector	
	Winter Haven Women's Hospital	61	Winter Haven, Florida	1987	2013		

== Awards and recognitions ==
BayCare has been recognized on the Tampa Bay Times Top Workplaces list for ten consecutive years as of 2024, and USA Today ranked them 59 on their Top Workplaces USA 2024 list. Both lists were "solely based on employee feedback gathered through the Energage employee engagement survey."

== See also ==
- AdventHealth
- Orlando Health
- Tampa General Hospital
