= Mease Countryside Hospital =

- BayCare Health System

Geography
- Location: 3231 McMullen Booth Rd., Safety Harbor, Florida, United States
- Coordinates: 28.03891°N 82.70806°W

Services
- Beds: 387

History
- Founded: 1986

Links
- Website: baycare.org/mch
- Lists: Hospitals in Florida

Mease Countryside Hospital is a hospital in Safety Harbor, Florida.
