= Saint Clare's Hospital (Manhattan) =

Former Catholic hospital in New York City, US

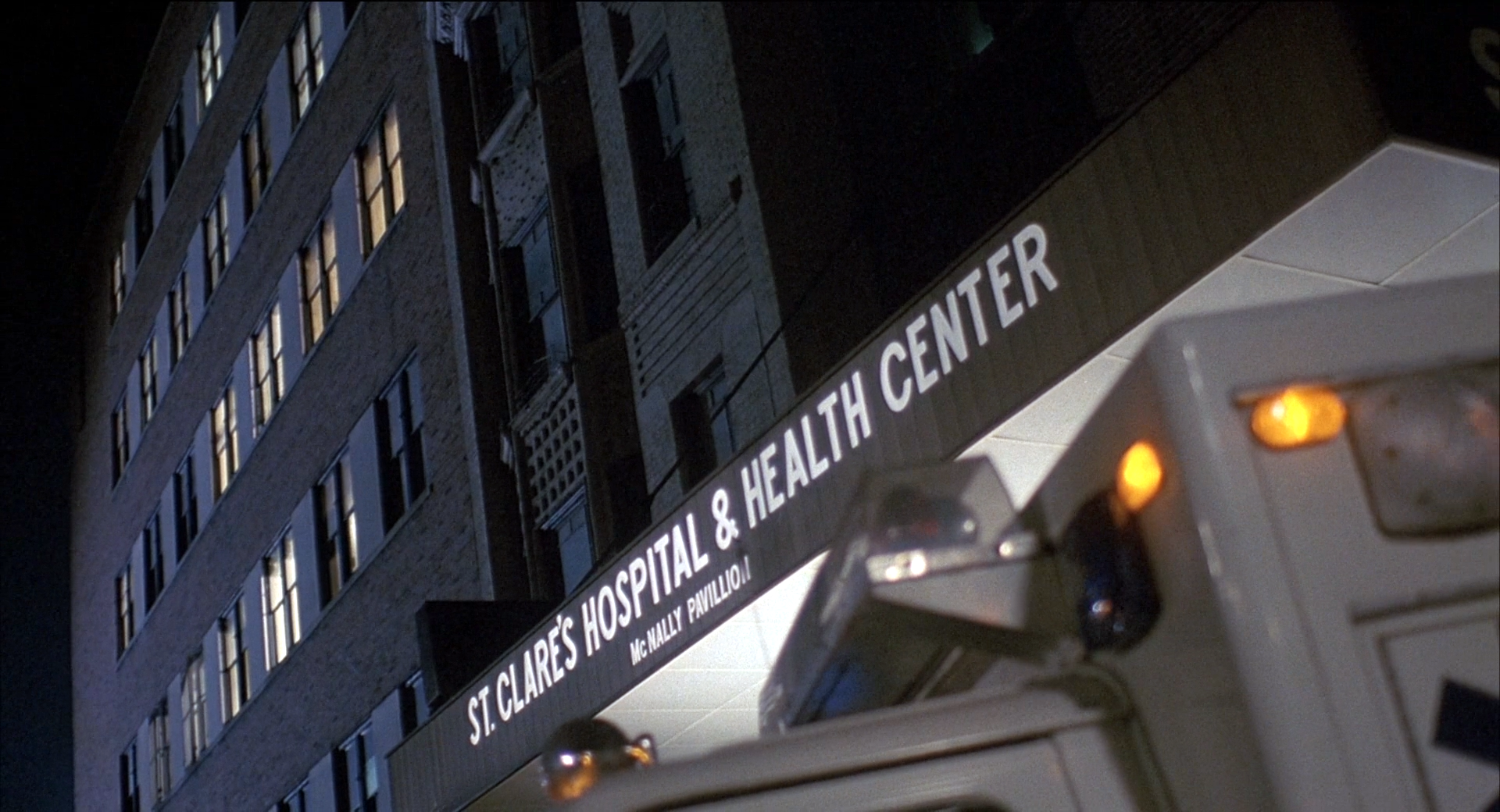
Entrance to St. Clare's Hospital c. 1986

Saint Clare's Hospital is a former Catholic hospital, located in the Hell's Kitchen neighborhood of Manhattan, New York City. It operated from 1934 to 2007.

The hospital was located at 415 W 51st St, Manhattan.

== History ==
The hospital was founded in 1934 by the Franciscan Sisters of Allegany, based in upstate New York, to serve a working-class Manhattan neighborhood, composed largely of Italian and Irish immigrants to the United States. It provided basic nursing care; to help with this, a school of nursing was founded.

In an effort to respond better to the changing needs of the neighborhood, the hospital expanded from basic medical care to provide a wide range of services, especially in the field of social service. One example was the founding in 1977 of a small shelter solely for homeless women, called The Dwelling Place. It was established by a small group of Franciscan Sisters who took over an abandoned brownstone near the hospital in order to house these women, who often refused to stay in public shelters because they did not feel safe in them.

By the early 1980s, the hospital had become St. Clare's Hospital and Health Center, and was operated by the Missionary Sisters of the Sacred Heart of Jesus. It had a capacity of 250 beds, as well as a small psychiatric unit of 12 beds.

=== Services provided ===
- Acute Renal Dialysis Services
- Alcohol And/Or Drug Services
- Ambulance (Owned) Services
- Anatomical Laboratory Services
- Anesthesia Services
- Blood Bank Services
- CT Scanner Services
- Cardio-Thoracic Surgery Services
- Clinical Laboratory Services
- Dedicated Emergency Department Services
- Dental Services
- Diagnostic Radiology Services
- Dietary Services
- Emergency Services
- ICU – Medical/Surgical Services
- Inpatient Surgical Services
- Magnetic Resonance Imaging (MRI) Services
- Maternity Services
- Neurology Inpatient, Outpatient and Electrophysiology Lab
- Nuclear Medicine Services
- Operating Room Services
- Outpatient Rehabilitation Services
- Outpatient Services
- Outpatient Surgery Unit Services
- Pharmacy Services
- Physical Therapy Services
- Podiatric Services
- Postoperative Recovery Room Services
- Psychiatric Services
- Respiratory Care Services
- Social Services

=== AIDS care ===
When AIDS began to emerge in the United States during the early 1980s, New York was one of the hardest-hit cities but had no specialized facility to address the patients' multiple needs. Despite his disagreements otherwise with the gay community, Archbishop John J. O'Connor approved the opening of such a facility at St. Clare's. It was the first hospital in New York to care for HIV/AIDS patients. Cardinal John O'Connor used to come in the evening and volunteered in the care of patients afflicted with AIDS. St. Clare's had a prison unit to care for prisoners with AIDS.

=== St. Vincent's Midtown Hospital ===
In 2003, the Franciscan Sisters came to the conclusion that they could no longer operate the hospital, due as much to the diminishing membership of the congregation as to finances. Arrangements were made to transfer the hospital to the auspices of Saint Vincent's Catholic Medical Center, the oldest Catholic hospital in the city, located in the Greenwich Village neighborhood. The transfer was accomplished and the hospital was renamed St. Vincent's Midtown Hospital.

=== Closing ===
In 2005, the Governor of New York, George Pataki, established the Commission on Health Care Facilities in the 21st Century. Its goal was to evaluate the services and capacities of the hospitals in the state, in order to find ways of streamlining medical care and avoiding the duplication of services. Chaired by Stephen Berger, it was commonly referred to as the "Berger Commission".

The Commission determined that St. Vincent's Midtown Hospital was superfluous to the needs of the local community and ordered its closure. This took place on August 31, 2007.

=== In media ===
St. Clare's Hospital and Health Center (address 408 West 52nd Street) was featured in the 1985 motion picture Remo Williams: The Adventure Begins. Scenes were shot in some interior rooms and the front entrance, visible at approximately 12 minutes 35 seconds into the film.
