= Florida State Road 549 =

State highway in Florida, United States

State Road 549
- 1st Street N

Route information
- Maintained by FDOT
- Length: 1.531 mi (2.464 km)

Major junctions
- South end: SR 542 in Winter Haven
- North end: SR 544 in Winter Haven

Location
- Country: United States
- State: Florida
- Counties: Polk

Highway system
- Florida State Highway System; Interstate; US; State; Former; Pre‑1945; Toll; Scenic
← SR 548	→ SR 551

State Road 549 (SR 549) is a north–south state road in the U.S. state of Florida. It runs 1.5 miles (2.4 km) through the downtown of Winter Haven as 1st Street N, the north–south axis of the city's grid plan.

== Route description ==
The signage of SR 549 begins at its intersection with SR 542 (Central Avenue) in the heart of downtown Winter Haven, near the main post office. 1st Street continues southward to SR 540 (Cypress Gardens Boulevard) but is not signed as SR 549. From Central Avenue, 1st Street heads northward, bypassing the Winter Haven Hospital, skirting Lake Silver, and paralleling U.S. Route 17. SR 549 terminates at the intersection where SR 544 jogs over; from this intersection, SR 544 heads west as Avenue T NW and eventually Havendale Blvd; and north as Lucerne Park Road.

== Major intersections ==
The entire route is in Winter Haven, Polk County.

mi	km	Destinations	Notes
0.000	0.000	SR 542 east (Central Avenue) – Downtown Winter Haven	
1.531	2.464	SR 544 (Avenue T North / First Street North)	
1.000 mi = 1.609 km; 1.000 km = 0.621 mi
