= Trinity Health Michigan =

Health care organization based in West Michigan

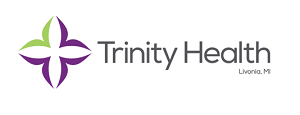
- Company type: Private (Not-for-profit)
- Industry: Healthcare
- Headquarters: Michigan, USA
- Area served: Michigan
- Parent: Trinity Health
- Website: www.trinityhealthmichigan.org

Trinity Health Michigan, formerly Mercy Health, is a not-for-profit, integrated, managed care health care organization based in West Michigan. Facilities include hospitals, treatment facilities, urgent-care facilities, as well as physician practices that serve the western Michigan area. Trinity Health Michigan is a member of the Catholic Trinity Health system.

== History ==
Mercy Health was formed in 2011 with the combining of Saint Mary's Health Care of Grand Rapids and Mercy Health Partners of Muskegon. Mercy Hospital in Cadillac and Mercy Hospital in Grayling were also incorporated into the group. The hospitals in Cadillac and Grayling were purchased by the Munson Healthcare system in February, 2015.

On April 12, 2022, Mercy Health announced it was merging with Saint Joseph Mercy Health system under the new name Trinity Health Michigan.

== Services ==
Trinity Health provides inpatient and outpatient services at a variety of locations throughout Michigan.

=== Hospitals ===
- Trinity Health Shelby Hospital, Shelby, Oceana County
- Trinity Health Muskegon Hospital, Muskegon
- Trinity Health Grand Rapids Hospital, Grand Rapids

== Awards ==
- 2023 CareerSTAT Frontline Healthcare Worker Champion
- CHIME Digital Health “Most Wired”
