= Holy Cross Hospital (Silver Spring) =

- Trinity Health

Geography
- Location: 1500 Forest Glen Road, Silver Spring, Maryland, U.S.
- Coordinates: 39.0146944°N 77.0350556°W

Organisation
- Care system: Private
- Type: Teaching
- Religious affiliation: Catholic
- Affiliated university: Trinity Health

Services
- Standards: JCAHO
- Emergency department: Level I Pediatric Trauma Center; Level II Seniors Trauma Center; Level III Primary Stroke Center
- Beds: 529

History
- Former name: Silver Spring Hospital (pre–1963)
- Founded: January 10, 1963; 63 years ago

Links
- Website: www.holycrosshealth.org
- Lists: Hospitals in U.S.
- Other links: MyChart

Holy Cross Hospital is a Catholic teaching hospital in Silver Spring, Maryland. It is the second-largest hospital in Maryland and was founded in 1963 by the Sisters of the Holy Cross. The hospital is part of Holy Cross Health, which is a member of Trinity Health of Livonia, Michigan, one of the largest health care systems in the country.

== By the Numbers (Fiscal Year 2018) ==
- Revenue: $611 million
- Licensed Hospital Beds: 529 (adult, pediatric & neonatal services)
- Employees: 4,100
- Physicians: 1,575
- Total Patient Visits: 240,371 (excludes healthy newborns)
- Inpatient Discharges: 36,146 (excludes healthy newborns)
- Outpatient Visits: 191,680
- Emergency Center Visits: 104,719
- Births: 10,779
- Surgeries: 12,966
- Health Center and Primary Care Visits: 49,195
- Net Community Benefit: $60 million
- Community Benefit Encounters: 338,518

== History ==
In 1944, a group of people, including Joseph Hayes, Fred L. Lutes, Lee H. Robinson, Genevieve Wells, and I.C. Whitaker, incorporated the Silver Spring Hospital Association in order to build a hospital in Silver Spring, Maryland. On July 22, 1959, plans to build and establish a hospital, named Holy Cross Hospital, in Silver Spring, Maryland, were released to the public. Montgomery County gave 25 acres of land on Forest Glen Road, but 14 of the acres were later given up in order to build the Capital Beltway. The Silver Spring Hospital Association had wanted to build a hospital on the remaining land, but it could not raise sufficient funding to do so until the Sisters of the Holy Cross congregation agreed to a large financial contribution. Additional funding came from a federal grant and from individual donors. The Silver Spring Hospital Association gave its land to the future Holy Cross Hospital. Montgomery County approved a special exception zoning permit to build the hospital on ten acres of land on Forest Glen Road in Silver Spring. A ground-breaking ceremony was held on May 8, 1960. Holy Cross Hospital was dedicated on January 6, 1963. Mrs. Robert K. Duckett was the first patient admitted to Holy Cross Hospital, and her daughter Dora Jean Duckett was the first baby born at the hospital. Since its opening, Holy Cross Hospital had a policy of treating patients regardless of their race or religion.

The hospital is a member of Trinity Health, as is Holy Cross Germantown. The hospital was the first in Maryland to have an MRI machine. In 2008, the hospital created an emergency center specifically designed to treat seniors who had acute health problems that were not life-threatening.

In 2015, the hospital concluded an expansion on the same footprint in Silver Spring.

== Transportation ==
Holy Cross Hospital is serviced by Ride On bus number 8. Washington Metro service on the Red Line is also available at the nearby Forest Glen station.

== See also ==
- List of hospitals in Maryland
