= Holy Cross Hospital (Fort Lauderdale) =

Holy Cross Health
- Trinity Health

Geography
- Location: Fort Lauderdale, Florida, United States
- Coordinates: 26°11′13″N 80°07′12″W

Services
- Beds: 557

History
- Opened: 1955

Links
- Website: www.holy-cross.com
- Lists: Hospitals in Florida

Holy Cross Health, formerly known as Holy Cross Hospital, is a Catholic hospital located in Fort Lauderdale, Florida. It is a member of Trinity Health.

== History ==
Founded in 1955 by the Sisters of Mercy, Holy Cross has received honors for its patient safety, orthopedics, urology, gynecology, women's health, geriatric, stroke care, heart failure, chronic obstructive pulmonary disease (COPD) and heart bypass surgery.

A full-service, acute care hospital, Holy Cross is home to the Jim Moran Heart and Vascular Center, Jim Moran Heart and Vascular Research Institute, Michael & Dianne Bienes Comprehensive Cancer Center, Rehabilitation Institute, Harry T. Mangurian, Jr. Diagnostic Imaging Center, Zachariah Family Wellness Pavilion and the Feldman Center for Optimal Health. Its satellite locations include the Orthopedic Institute, Orthopedic Research Institute Dorothy Mangurian Comprehensive Women's Center, Urgent Care and Imaging Centers, HealthPlex, Holy Cross Medical Group offices and outpatient rehabilitation services.

The hospital is currently a non-profit, 557-bed Catholic hospital. It is a member of Trinity Health.
