= Loyola University Medical Center =

Loyola Medicine
- Trinity Health
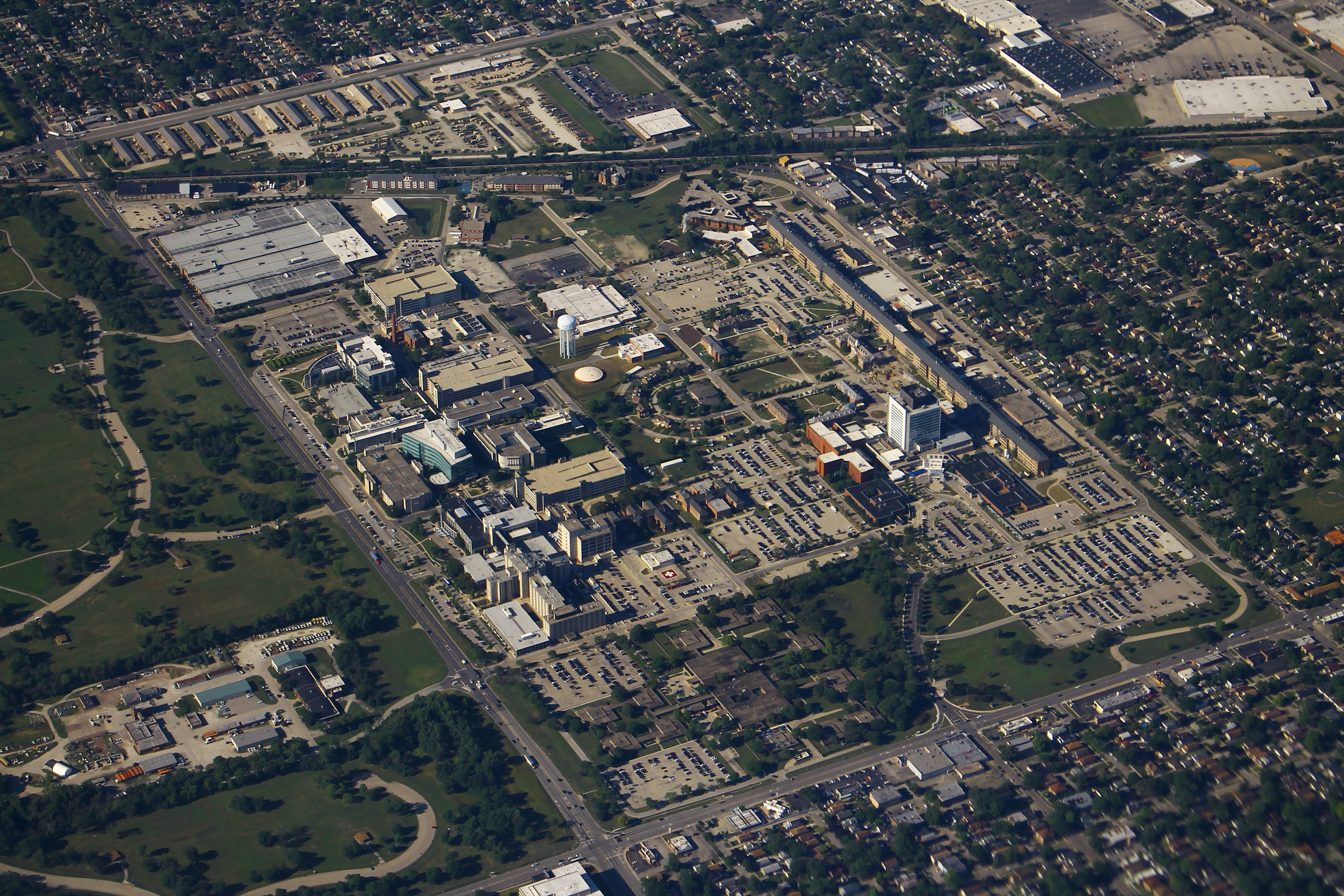
- Aerial view of the hospital

Geography
- Location: Maywood, Illinois, United States
- Coordinates: 41°51′31″N 87°50′7″W

Organization
- Care system: Private, Medicaid, Medicare
- Type: Teaching
- Affiliated university: Loyola University Chicago

Services
- Emergency department: Level I trauma center
- Beds: 547

History
- Founded: 1969

Links
- Website: www.loyolamedicine.org
- Lists: Hospitals in Illinois

Loyola Medicine, also known as Loyola University Health System, is a quaternary-care system with a main medical center campus located in Maywood, Illinois, a western suburb of Chicago. The heart of the medical center campus is the Loyola University Medical Center. Also on campus are the Joseph Cardinal Bernardin Cancer Center (now named for the late Cardinal Joseph Louis Bernardin, Archbishop of Chicago, who was a patient at the Cancer Center when he died in November 1996 from metastatic pancreatic cancer) Loyola Outpatient Center, Center for Heart & Vascular Medicine and Loyola Oral Health Center as well as the Loyola University Chicago Stritch School of Medicine, Loyola University Chicago Marcella Niehoff School of Nursing, Center for Translational Research and Education, and the Loyola Center for Fitness.

Loyola's Gottlieb campus in Melrose Park, Illinois, includes the 264-licensed-bed community hospital, the Gottlieb Health and Fitness Center and the Marjorie G. Weinberg Cancer Care Center. In 2018, Tenet Healthcare sold the formerly for-profit MacNeal Hospital, in Berwyn, Illinois, to Loyola Medicine. Loyola University Health System has been a member of Trinity Health since July 2011. The Neiswanger Institute for Bioethics and Health Policy is a part of the Stritch School of Medicine.

Loyola Medicine has made news for delivering two of the smallest babies to ever survive: one born 8 inches (20 cm) long and weighed 8.6 ounces (240 g), and another was born at 26 weeks weighing 9.9 ounces (280 g) and measuring 9.5 inches (24 cm).

== Programs ==
Loyola University Medical Center has 50 residency and fellowship training programs in the following medical and surgical specialties. Residency programs available are: anesthesia, combined medicine/pediatrics, dental medicine, dermatology, emergency medicine (starting in 2019), family medicine, general surgery, internal medicine, neurological surgery, neurology, nuclear medicine, obstetrics and gynecology, ophthalmology, oral/maxillofacial surgery, orthopaedic surgery, otolaryngology, pathology, pediatrics, physical medicine and rehabilitation, plastic and reconstructive surgery, podiatry, psychiatry and behavioral sciences, radiation oncology, radiology, thoracic and cardiovascular surgery, and urology. Fellowship opportunities include: addiction medicine, advanced heart failure and transplant cardiology, anesthesia (CV and thoracic), anesthesia (pain management), body imaging, cardiology (EP), cardiology (interventional), cardiology (imaging), cytopathology, endocrinology and metabolism, endourology and laparoscopic surgery, female pelvic medicine and reconstructive surgery, gastroenterology and nutrition, geriatric psychiatry, geriatric medicine, hand surgery, hematology and oncology, hematopathology, infectious disease, interventional radiology, neonatology, nephrology, neurology (clinical neurophysiology), neurology (headache medicine), neurology (vascular), neuroradiology, orthopaedic hand surgery, pulmonary and critical care medicine, rheumatology, surgical critical care, surgical pathology, and vascular surgery and endovascular therapy.
