= Florida State Road 542 =

State highway in Florida, United States

State Road 542
- SR 542 in red, CR 542 in blue

Route information
- Maintained by FDOT
- Length: 5.958 mi (9.588 km)

Major junctions
- West end: SR 549 in Winter Haven
- East end: US 27 in Dundee

Location
- Country: United States
- State: Florida
- Counties: Polk

Highway system
- Florida State Highway System; Interstate; US; State; Former; Pre‑1945; Toll; Scenic
| ← SR 540 | → SR 544 |

State Road 542 (SR 542) is a west–east route in Central Florida, serving Polk County. It runs 6 miles from downtown Winter Haven to west of downtown Dundee, Florida.

== Route description ==
State Road 542 starts in the heart of downtown Winter Haven, as Central Avenue, the west–east axis of the city's grid plan. Its western terminus is the intersection with 1st Street (SR 549), the city's north–south axis. As it heads eastward, it soon reaches Lake Elbert, whose southern shore it skirts as Lake Elbert Drive SE. Past Lake Elbert, it shoots due eastward as Dundee Road, passing Overlook Drive, a southwest–northeast access route to Cypress Gardens Blvd, and intersecting with US 27 at the Dundee Ridge Plaza shopping center. True to its name, Dundee Road leads from US 27 to the downtown of Dundee, where it intersects with SR 17, the Scenic Highway.

== Major intersections ==
The entire route is in Polk County.

| Location | mi | km | Destinations | Notes |
|---|---|---|---|---|
| Winter Haven | 0.000 | 0.000 | SR 549 north (1st Street North) – Chain of Lakes Baseball Stadium | |
| Winter Haven | 4.100 | 6.598 | CR 550 west (Overlook Drive) – Legoland | |
| Dundee | 5.958 | 9.588 | US 27 (SR 25) to I-4 | |
1.000 mi = 1.609 km; 1.000 km = 0.621 mi

== Related routes ==
=== County Road 542 ===
County Road 542
- Location: Winter Haven

County Road 542 exists in three separate places in Polk County:

- One segment, called Old Tampa Highway, traverses western Lakeland from County Line Road to Wabash Avenue.
- The middle segment has its western terminus at Gary Road in eastern Lakeland, where it is known as E Main Street and then K-Ville Avenue. It traverses eastward toward Winter Haven, where it is called Avenue G NW, conforming with the city's grid plan and ending at US 17 near where SR 542 picks up.
- The easternmost segment starts at SR 17 just south of Dundee, near the eastern terminus of SR 542. This segment, known as Lake Hatchineha Road, leads deep through rural Polk County all the way to Lake Hatchineha.

=== County Road 542A ===
County Road 542A
- Location: Winston-Galloway

County Road 542A is North Galloway Road from SR 572 & CR 542 in Winston, Florida to CR 35A in Galloway, Florida, though the route is not signed until north of the northern terminus of SR 572 at US 92. The route was formerly SR 542A.
