= Morton Plant North Bay Hospital =

- BayCare Health System

Geography
- Location: 6600 Madison St., New Port Richey, Florida, United States
- Coordinates: 28°15′15″N 82°42′52″W

Services
- Beds: 222

History
- Founded: 1965

Links
- Website: https://baycare.org/mpnb
- Lists: Hospitals in Florida

Morton Plant North Bay Hospital is a hospital in New Port Richey, Florida. In 2010, two brand new buildings opened: Starkey Tower and the Medical Arts Building. In addition to the new buildings, the hospital opened the Richard and Laura Bekesh Education and Conference Center which hosts community lectures, support groups, and health screenings. North Bay Hospital is also home to Mitchell Rehabilitation Hospital, a 30-bed acute rehab facility.
