= Dundee, Florida =

Town in the state of Florida, United States

- Town
- Town of Dundee
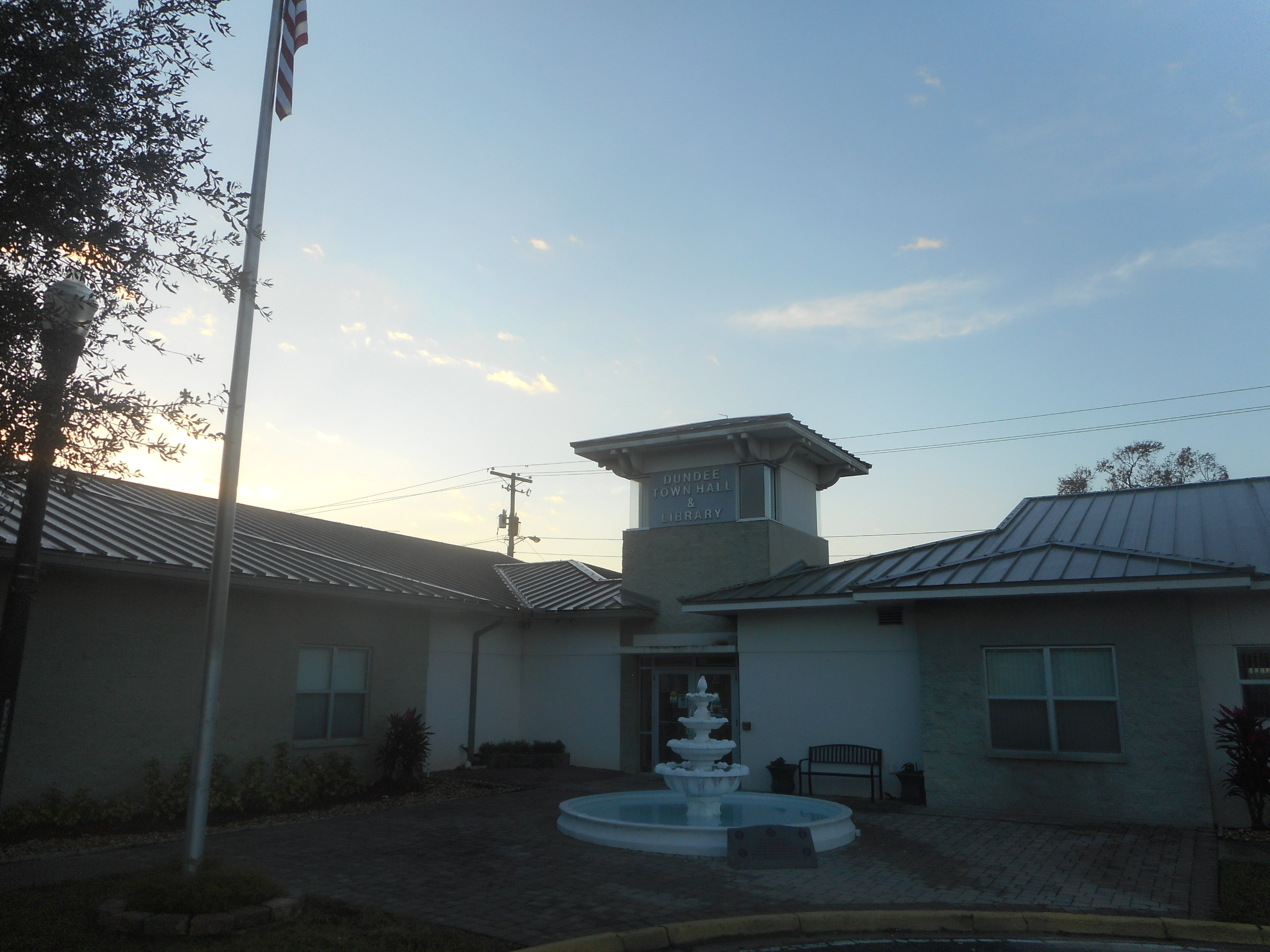
- The Dundee Town Hall and Library as seen in January 2022.

- Seal

- Location in Polk County and the state of Florida
- Coordinates: 28°00′41″N 81°35′58″W
- Country: United States
- State: Florida
- County: Polk
- Settled: 1911
- Incorporated: 1925
- Named after: Dundee, Scotland

Government
  - Type: Commission-Manager

Area
  - Total: 12.13 sq mi (31.41 km^{2})
  - Land: 10.78 sq mi (27.91 km^{2})
  - Water: 1.35 sq mi (3.50 km^{2})
- Elevation: 213 ft (65 m)

Population (2020)
  - Total: 5,235
  - Density: 485.8/sq mi (187.55/km^{2})
- Time zone: UTC-5 (Eastern (EST))
  - Summer (DST): UTC-4 (EDT)
- ZIP code: 33838
- Area code: 863
- FIPS code: 12-18550
- GNIS feature ID: 2406406
- Website: http://www.townofdundee.com

Dundee is a town in Polk County, Florida, United States. The population was 5,235 at the 2020 census. It is part of the Lakeland–Winter Haven Metropolitan Statistical Area.

== History ==
A post office called Dundee has been in operation since 1912. The town was named after Dundee, in Scotland. Dundee was first settled in 1911, and incorporated as a town in 1925. On April 2, 2024, the town held a referendum on whether it should adopt city status. 68% voted for Dundee to remain a town, compared to 32% voting in favour of being a city.

== Geography and climate ==
According to the United States Census Bureau, the town has a total area of 4.3 square miles (11 km^{2}), of which 3.9 square miles (10 km^{2}) is land and 0.4 square miles (1.0 km^{2}) (8.82%) is water.

Dundee is located in the humid subtropical climate zone under (Köppen climate classification: Cfa).

== Demographics ==
Historical population
Census	Pop.	Note	%±
1930	615		—
1940	694		12.8%
1950	1,152		66.0%
1960	1,554		34.9%
1970	1,660		6.8%
1980	2,227		34.2%
1990	2,335		4.8%
2000	2,912		24.7%
2010	3,717		27.6%
2020	5,235		40.8%
U.S. Decennial Census

=== Racial and ethnic composition ===
Dundee racial composition (Hispanics excluded from racial categories) (NH = Non-Hispanic)
Race	Pop 2010	Pop 2020	% 2010	% 2020
White (NH)	1,850	1,955	49.77%	37.34%
Black or African American (NH)	920	1,129	24.75%	21.57%
Native American or Alaska Native (NH)	5	13	0.13%	0.25%
Asian (NH)	61	93	1.64%	1.78%
Pacific Islander or Native Hawaiian (NH)	1	2	0.03%	0.04%
Some other race (NH)	18	64	0.48%	1.22%
Two or more races/Multiracial (NH)	70	171	1.88%	3.27%
Hispanic or Latino (any race)	792	1,808	21.31%	34.54%
Total	3,717	5,235		

=== 2020 census ===
As of the 2020 census, Dundee had a population of 5,235. The median age was 38.4 years. 24.6% of residents were under the age of 18 and 16.9% of residents were 65 years of age or older. For every 100 females there were 95.6 males, and for every 100 females age 18 and over there were 93.4 males age 18 and over.

92.3% of residents lived in urban areas, while 7.7% lived in rural areas.

There were 1,853 households in Dundee, of which 37.3% had children under the age of 18 living in them. Of all households, 48.6% were married-couple households, 18.3% were households with a male householder and no spouse or partner present, and 26.8% were households with a female householder and no spouse or partner present. About 22.4% of all households were made up of individuals and 10.4% had someone living alone who was 65 years of age or older.

There were 2,242 housing units, of which 17.4% were vacant. The homeowner vacancy rate was 4.2% and the rental vacancy rate was 14.5%.

According to the 2020 ACS 5-year estimates, there were 1,218 families residing in the town.

=== 2010 census ===
As of the 2010 United States census, there were 3,717 people, 1,602 households, and 1,047 families residing in the town.

=== 2000 census ===
At the 2000 census there were 2,912 people, 1,123 households, and 811 families in the town. The population density was 740.7 inhabitants per square mile (286.0/km^{2}). There were 1,457 housing units at an average density of 370.6 units per square mile (143.1 units/km^{2}). The racial makeup of the town was 69.92% White, 22.05% African American, 0.14% Native American, 0.93% Asian, 0.03% Pacific Islander, 5.56% from other races, and 1.37% from two or more races. Hispanic or Latino of any race were 11.37%.

Of the 1,123 households in 2000, 28.3% had children under the age of 18 living with them, 55.7% were married couples living together, 13.2% had a female householder with no husband present, and 27.7% were non-families. 24.1% of households were one person and 14.3% were one person aged 65 or older. The average household size was 2.57 and the average family size was 3.04.

In 2000, the age distribution was 26.0% under the age of 18, 6.9% from 18 to 24, 23.0% from 25 to 44, 20.9% from 45 to 64, and 23.2% 65 or older. The median age was 40 years. For every 100 females, there were 91.8 males. For every 100 females age 18 and over, there were 87.7 males.

In 2000, the median household income was $29,174 and the median family income was $33,831. Males had a median income of $30,218 versus $20,449 for females. The per capita income for the town was $14,411. About 11.8% of families and 12.8% of the population were below the poverty line, including 19.3% of those under age 18 and 11.8% of those age 65 or over.

== Transportation ==
The major roads running through Dundee are:

- US 27 – Located just west of town, this divided highway leads to Lake Wales and Haines City.
- SR 17 – This Scenic Highway goes through the center of town and provides an alternate route parallel to US 27 across eastern Polk County.
- SR 542 – Also called Dundee Road, it leads from downtown Dundee to US 27 and on westward, straight to downtown Winter Haven.
