= Gessler Clinic =

Gessler Clinic, P.A.

Geography
- Location: Main clinic at 635 First Street North, Winter Haven, Florida 33881-4191, southeast United States, Florida, United States
- Coordinates: Main clinic 28.0284°N 81.7273°W

Organization
- Type: privately owned for-profit medical clinic

History
- Founded: 1957

Links
- Website: gesslerclinic.com

Gessler Clinic, P.A., is one of two large outpatient clinic systems based in Winter Haven, Florida. The other is Bond Clinic, P.A. Gessler has six locations, all in Winter Haven. Residents of other area communities visit Gessler.

== History ==
Gessler Clinic was founded in January 1957 by three physicians, Ivan Gessler, Newell J. Griffith and Charles T. Parks. It purchased the building next to the main clinic in February 1997. The purchased building became Gessler Annex. Over the years Gessler expanded to other locations to become one of the larger clinic systems in central Florida.

== Services ==
Gessler Clinic has a number of medical providers. Its medical staff consists of the following:

- Doctors of Medicine (M.D.) - 34
- Doctors of Osteopathic Medicine (D.O.) - 5
- Doctor of Podiatric Medicine (DPM)- 2
- Nurse practitioners - 5 CFNP

Specialties include pain management, allergy/immunology, gynecology, podiatry, internal medicine, family practice and pulmonology. The various facilities of the clinic provide in-house laboratory services, various radiology services, holter monitoring and stress testing.

== Locations ==
Gessler Clinic offers services from six locations, all in Winter Haven. The addresses and coordinates for the individual locations are:

- Main clinic - 635 First Street North - 28.0284°N 81.7273°W
- Annex - 601 First Street North - 28.0279°N 81.7272°W
- Obstetrics center - 440 E. Central Avenue - 28.0220°N 81.7215°W
- Women's center - 450 E. Central Avenue - 28.0220°N 81.7212°W
- Orthopedic Division - 101 Avenue D, NW - 28.0262°N 81.7272°W

The main clinic and annex are next to each other, the buildings separated by only about 3 feet (0.91 m). The women's center and the Orthopedic Division are also next to each other. Also, on the block to the west of the main clinic is a building used for administrative purposes. It is on South Lake Silver Drive.

== Ratings ==
The Vitals website provides patient rating information related to Gessler Clinic. Patients fill out surveys through the Vitals website concerning their experiences with individual physicians and related medical providers at the Clinic. Gessler itself is not directly rated through this website. As of July 2012, 125 patients rated medical providers at Gessler. The overall patient rating of providers was three of a possible four stars. Also, the patient surveys address the amount of time the patient waits to see a provider once he/she enters the provider waiting area. The national average wait time is twenty-one minutes and the average time at Gessler is twenty-two minutes. The Healthgrades website provides basic information on Gessler, but almost no provider ratings are on its website.

In May 2012 documents with personal information from about 1,400 patients were stolen from Gessler Clinic. In response, Gessler offered a free year of credit monitoring services to patients affected by this theft.
