= Franciscan Sisters of Allegany =

Franciscan Sisters of Allegany, NY
- Abbreviation: FSA
- Formation: 1859; 167 years ago
- Type: Religious institute
- Headquarters: Allegany, New York, U.S.
- Region served: United States, Jamaica, Brazil, Bolivia, Mozambique
- Website: www.alleganyfranciscans.org

The congregation of the Franciscan Sisters of Allegany, with its motherhouse at St. Elizabeth's Motherhouse, Allegany, New York, was founded in 1859 by the Very Rev. Father Pamfilo of Magliano, O.F.M.

== History ==
Father Pamfilo had come to the United States at the invitation of Bishop John Timon, C.M., of the Diocese of Buffalo, in order to provide education for the young Catholics of Western New York. To this end, he founded the College of St. Bonaventure (now St. Bonaventure University).

The bishop had reservations about having mixed classes of boys and girls being taught by the friar. He therefore suggested that Father Pamfilo should establish a group of religious sisters for this work. In keeping with this, the friar accepted the request of Mary Jane Todd to commit herself to the consecrated life, and, on April 25, 1859, in the chapel of the new college he gave her the habit of the Franciscan Third Order Regular and the name of Sister Mary Joseph. She was joined by two other women by the end of the year, Sister Mary Bridget and Sister Mary Teresa, a native of New Jersey, who, at the age of 15, had been recruited for this vocation by Father Pamfilo. This allowed the formation of a new congregation.

The Sisters opened St. Elizabeth Academy in the town of Allegany in 1860, followed soon by a parochial school at the Sparish of St. Francis of Assisi in Manhattan, staffed by the friars.

The Sisters remained under the authority of Father Pamfilo until 1865, when he gave them a set of statutes to govern their life which he had adapted from the Franciscan Sisters of Glasgow, Scotland. At that time, the Sisters held their first Chapter and elected Reverend Mother Mary Teresa O'Neil as the first Superior General of the congregation. She served in that position for the next 55 years.

In 1866, at the request of Archbishop John McCloskey, Fr. Pamfilo sent friars to New York City, where they opened St. Anthony's Church on Sullivan Street to serve the Italian and Irish immigrants. Realizing they needed additional assistance, the friars called on the Franciscan Sisters of Allegany and St. Anthony's School was opened in 1874. Although the school closed in 2005, the sisters of St. Anthony Convent continue to serve in the parish.

In 1879, three Sisters were sent to Jamaica, British West Indies, to assist the Franciscan Sisters of Glasgow, who had established a boarding and day school for girls, which they named "The Immaculate Conception Academy".

They were the first congregation founded in the United States to send overseas missionaries. Missions in Latin America were established in the 20th century.

== Healthcare ==
The congregation expanded into health care in 1883, opening hospitals. They operated two hospitals in Manhattan, St. Elizabeth Hospital in Upper Manhattan, and St. Clare's Hospital in Hells Kitchen. St. Clare's was one of the first hospitals in the nation to focus on the care of AIDS patients. On completion of her term of office as leader of the Allegany Franciscan congregation, Sister Regina Catherine Kane, herself, went to St. Clare's to assist patient with AIDS, a service the Hospital rendered until its closing in 2007. Both are now closed.

== Florida ministry ==
In 1927 the sisters arrived in Miami, Florida to staff Allison Hospital, established by businessman James A. Allison. It was later renamed St. Francis Hospital and closed in 1992 after being purchased for real estate development. In 1931 the sisters acquired Faith Hospital in St. Petersburg, Florida, renaming it St. Anthony's Hospital. In 1934 they established St. Joseph's Hospital in Tampa. The last two Allegany Franciscans left Miami for their motherhouse in December 2019.

== See also ==
- Lourdes Health System (New Jersey, USA)
- St. Anthony's Hospital (St. Petersburg, Florida)
