= St. Anthony's Hospital (St. Petersburg, Florida) =

Geography
- Location: 1200 7th Ave. N., St. Petersburg, Florida, United States
- Coordinates: 27°46′42.41″N 82°38′51.61″W

Organization
- Religious affiliation: Roman Catholic

Services
- Beds: 393

History
- Founded: 1931

Links
- Website: baycare.org/sah
- Lists: Hospitals in Florida

St. Anthony's Hospital is a private 393-bed hospital in St. Petersburg, Florida. It was founded by the Franciscan Sisters of Allegany in 1931 and is part of BayCare Health System.

== History ==
The hospital opened in 1920 as Faith Hospital. The hospital faced financial troubles due to the Great Depression and closed in 1930. In June 1931, the Franciscan Sisters of Allegany bought Faith Hospital for $40,000 (equivalent to $847,000 in 2025). They renamed the hospital after the Franciscan saint, St. Anthony of Padua, because of his selfless dedication to God.
