= Stone School (Ann Arbor, Michigan) =

- U.S. National Register of Historic Places
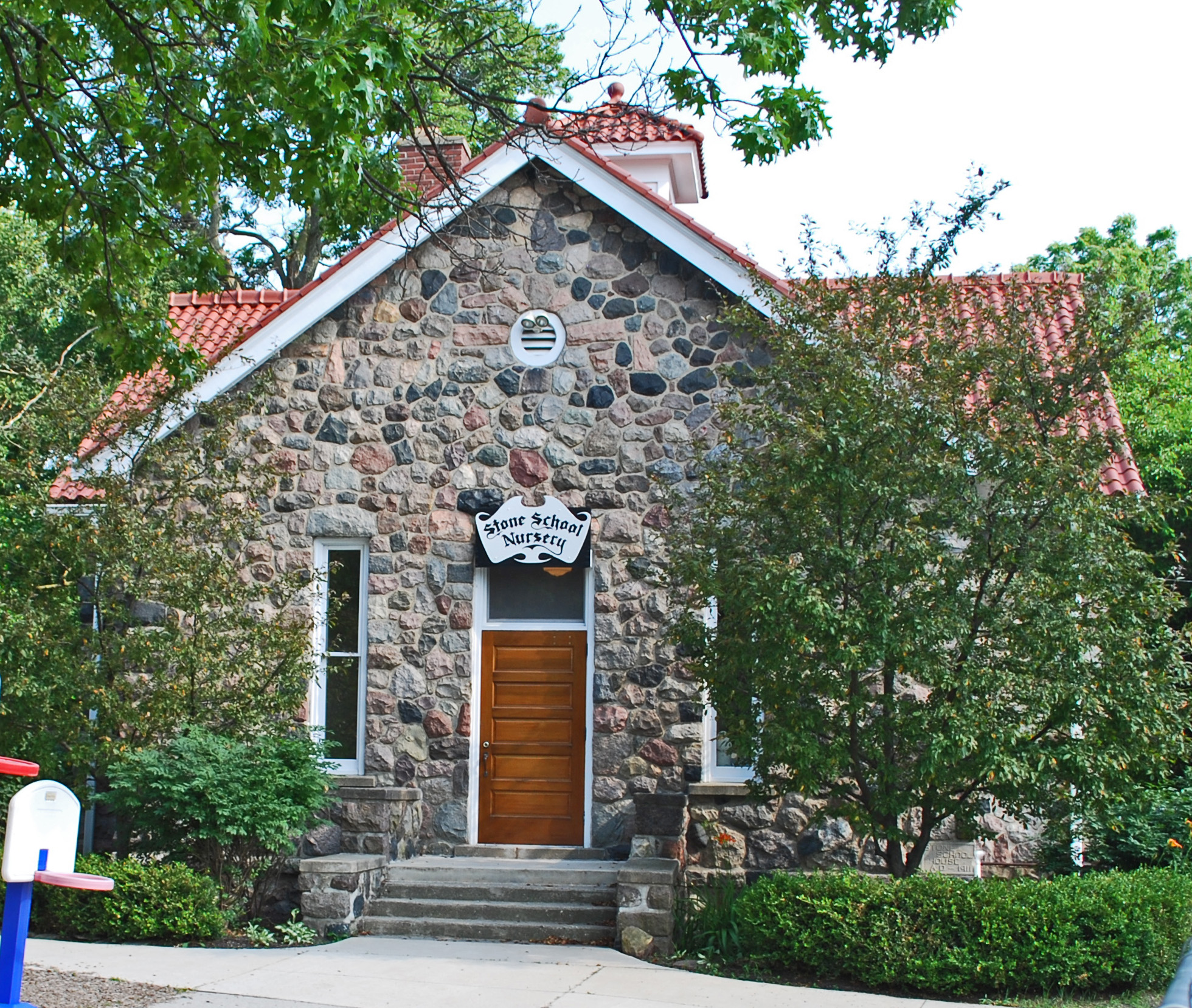
- Interactive map
- Location: 2600 Packard Rd., Ann Arbor, Michigan
- Coordinates: 42°14′49″N 83°43′10″W
- Area: less than one acre
- Built: 1911
- Architectural style: Bungalow/craftsman
- NRHP reference No.: 95001386
- Added to NRHP: November 29, 1995

The Stone School is a school building located at 2600 Packard Road in Ann Arbor, Michigan. It was listed on the National Register of Historic Places in 1995. Beginning in 1955, the building houses the Stone School Cooperative Nursery.

== History ==
In 1852, Dr. Benajah Ticknor leased this plot of land to the newly formed Pittsfield School District Number 2, for use as a school site. By 1853, the district parents had gathered fieldstones and constructed a small Greek Revival schoolhouse. In the following years, the surrounding area grew, so that by 1881 the school was serving Fractional District Number 7. By 1911, the district had outgrown its schoolhouse, so the parents demolished the old school and constructed this new one, using the old stones as well as new ones gathered for the purpose. The school gained recognition from the state Superintendent of Public Instruction Fred L. Keeler, who designated it a model "Standard School" in his 1914-1914 report.

The following year, the landowner, Aaron Sommers, sold the land the school is placed on to the Pittsfield Schools for $30. The district continued to grow, and a frame classroom was added to the lot. In 1949, a new concrete block school was built across the street, and in 1953 the stone school was renovated. The Ann Arbor Public Schools acquired the school in 1955, and a group of local parents formed the Stone School Cooperative Nursery, opening in the schoolhouse. In 1995, this group purchased the building from the school district.

== Description ==
Stone School is a single-story one-room schoolhouse located on a triangular plot of land, now fenced to protect the playground. It has fieldstone walls and a cross-gabled red tile roof. Larger fieldstones form a ground-level beltcourse, corner quoins, and shallow arches above the doors and windows. The main portion of the building holds the classroom, and contains broad, square-head window on each narrow side. A front-gable entry projects forward, ad contains a wooden door with a transom above, flanked by long, narrow, double-hung, one-over-one window units. The entry is reached via wide stone steps. There is a concrete block addition in the rear.

On the interior, the entry leads to a hall with an office on one side and an open coat area on the other. The coat area also contains an enclosed stair to the basement. The remainder of the interior is one large room with a high ceiling, plaster walls, and bead board wainscot.

== Gallery ==
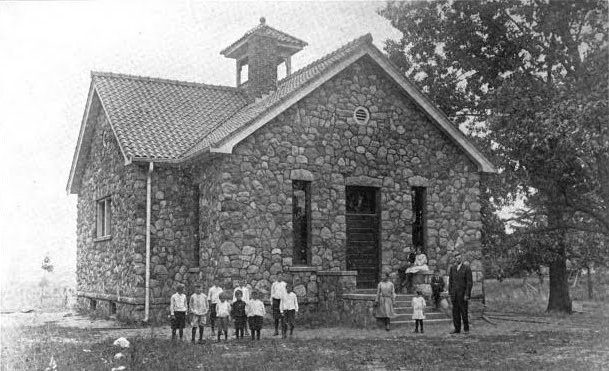
Stone School 1914

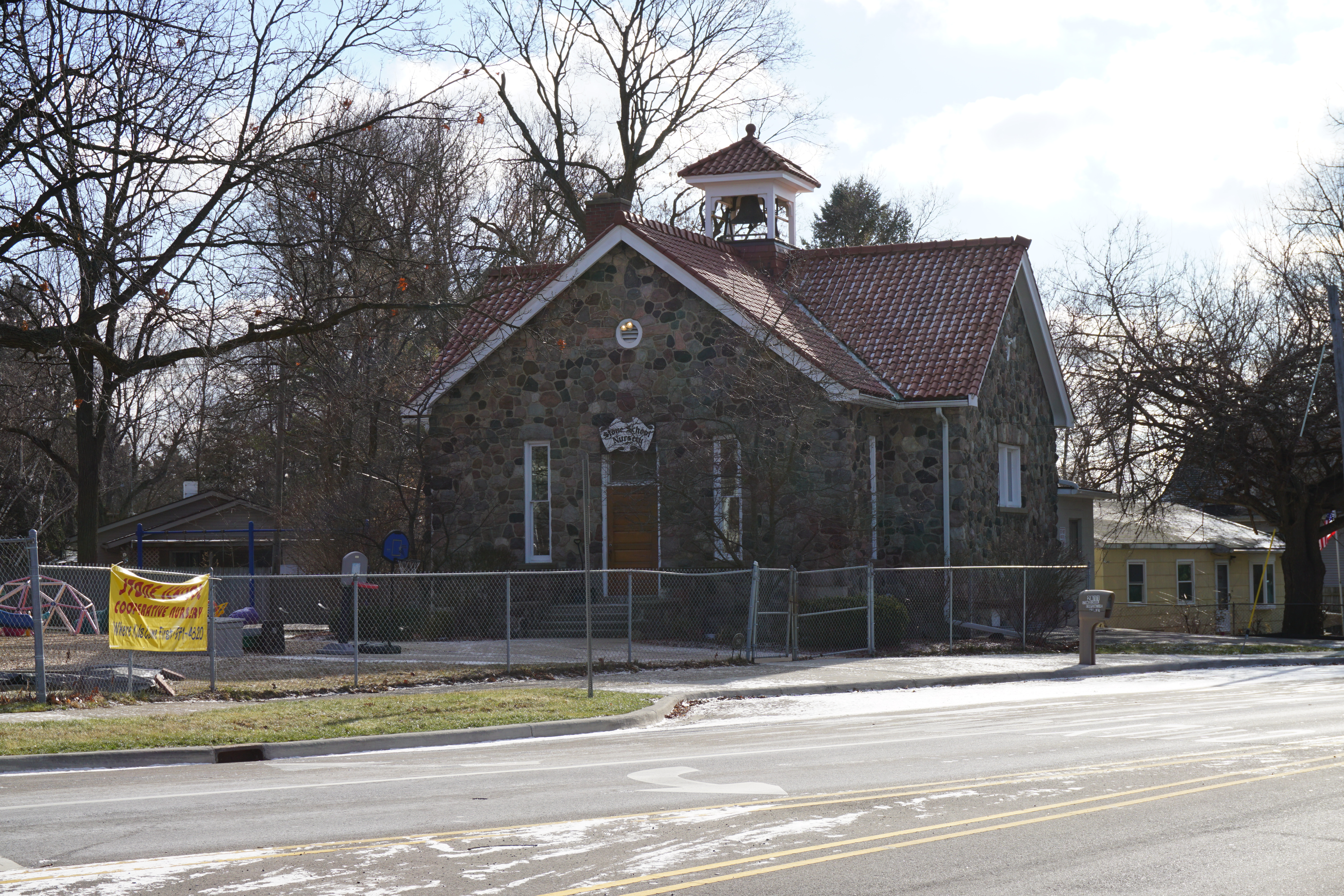
Stone School 2014
