= Winter Haven =

Winter Haven or Winterhaven may refer to:

- Winterhaven, California, in Imperial County
- Winterhaven Village, California, in El Dorado County
- Winter Haven, Florida
- Winter Haven High School
- Winter Haven Red Sox
- Winter Haven's Gilbert Airport
- Winter Haven Super Sox
- Winter Haven Area Transit
- Winter Haven (Amtrak station)
- Winter Haven Heights Historic Residential District
- "Winter Haven", the eighth track on the 2010 album Festival by Jon Oliva's Pain
