= List of people from Winter Haven, Florida =

The following is a list of notable people who were born in, lived in or are associated with the city of Winter Haven, Florida:

- Frank Attkisson, politician
- Andre Berto, professional welterweight boxer
- Otis Birdsong, former professional basketball player
- George A. "Banana George" Blair, professional barefoot skier
- Kenneth Brokenburr, gold medalist, 4x100 meter relay team at the 2000 Summer Olympics
- Lem Burnham, football player
- Chris Cameron, gymnast
- Stephen Christian, lead singer of Anberlin
- Tim Ford, Mississippi lawyer and legislator
- Rowdy Gaines, Olympic 3-time gold medal swimmer
- Michael Griffin, U.S. representative from Wisconsin
- Gloria Hendry, actress
- Ralph Houk, former manager of Major League Baseball's New York Yankees, Detroit Tigers, and Boston Red Sox
- Gene Leedy, modern architect
- Charlie Manuel, former manager of MLB's Philadelphia Phillies
- Cory Mills, U.S. representative
- Jake Owen, country singer
- Kathleen Parker, author and syndicated columnist
- Gram Parsons, country and rock musician
- James Lord Pierpont, songwriter of "Jingle Bells", uncle of J.P. Morgan
- Dick Pope, Sr., founder of Cypress Gardens and famed water-skier
- Dick Pope, Jr., former world champion water-skier and bare-foot water-skier
- Alex Ramirez, professional baseball player
- Lawrence Scarpa, architect
- Jordan Schafer, MLB player
- Burt Shotton, former manager of MLB's Philadelphia Phillies and Brooklyn Dodgers
- John A. Snively, pioneer citrus grower, developed extensive groves in the Winter Haven area
- Jim Stafford, country singer
- Dewey Tomko, professional poker player
- Kaylee Tuck, Florida state politician
- O.D. Wilson, powerlifter and professional strongman
- Michael Yon, journalist
