= Martha Lake =

Martha Lake or Lake Martha may be one of several places in the United States:

Populated place

- Martha Lake, Washington, a census-designated place

Lakes

- Martha Lake (California), a lake in Kings Canyon National Park
- Martha Lake (Colorado), a lake in Jackson County, Colorado
- Lake Martha (Florida)
- Lake Martha (Minnesota)
- Martha Lake (Montana), a lake in Flathead County, Montana
- Lake Martha (South Dakota)
- Lake Martha (Washington), a lake in Snohomish County, Washington
- Lake Martha (Utah), a lake near the Brighton Ski Resort area of Big Cottonwood Canyon
