= Georgia Groen =

New Zealand barefoot water-skier

Georgia Groen is a New Zealand barefoot water-skier. In 2016, she won the overall open women's title at the Barefoot Waterski World Championships held in Wisconsin, United States.

== Biography ==
Groen grew up in the North Island town of Ōtaki, where she attended Kāpiti College. In 2013, she moved to Christchurch to study at the University of Canterbury.

=== Competitions ===
Groen competed in her first event at the age of 8, and her first world championship event at the age of 12, in 2009. In 2013, she attended the Barefoot Waterski World Championships in Mulwala, Australia, and won silver in the overall open women's section.

In the 2016 championship, Groen won the overall open women's title, and also her third consecutive open world trick title, silver in open slalom, silver in open jump and a bronze in the open team overall event.

=== Awards ===
In 2011, Groen won the Kāpiti Emerging Sportsperson of the Year Award, and the Sportsperson of the Year in 2012.
