= Barefoot skiing =

Variant of water skiing where water skis are not used

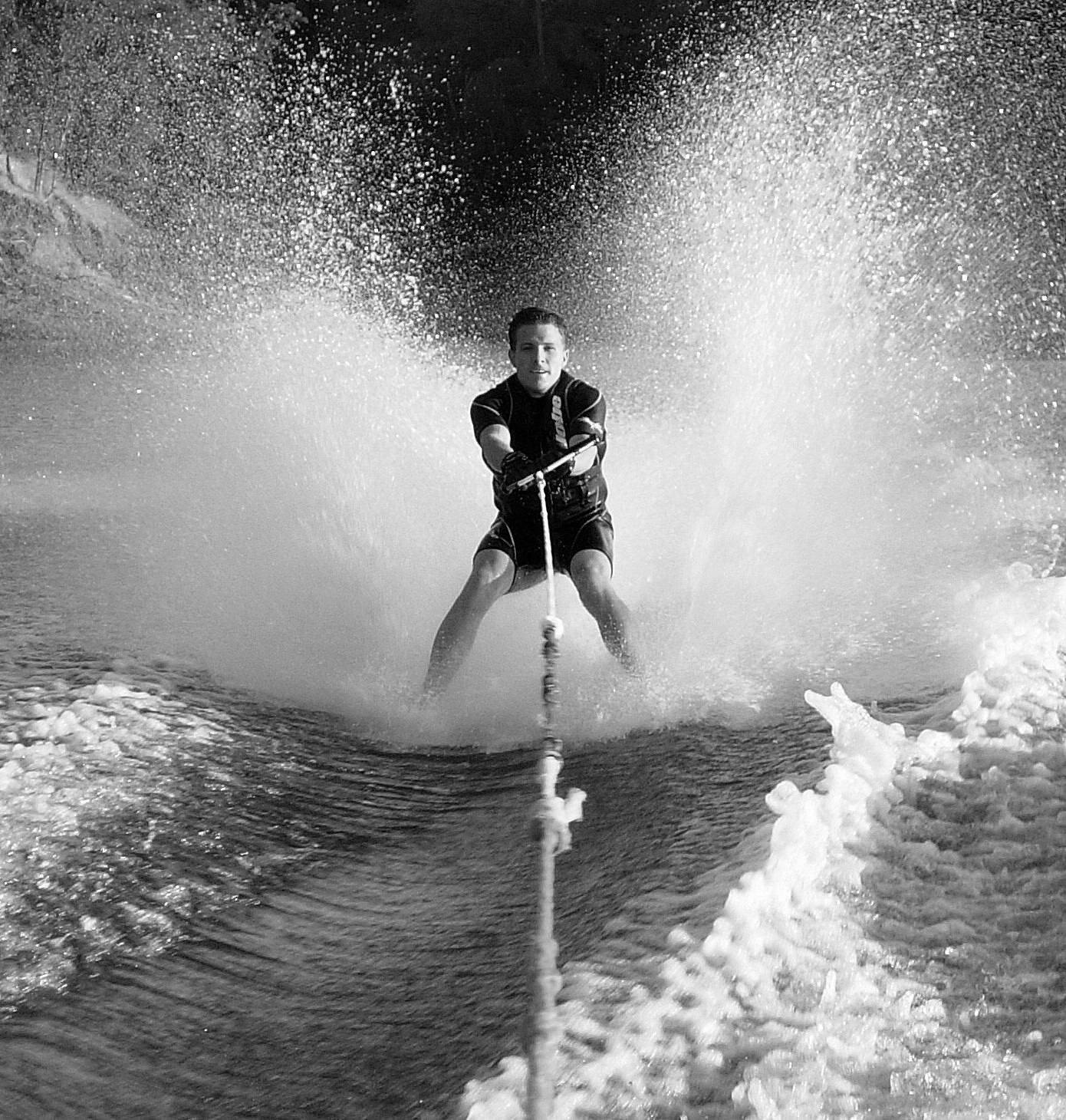
Barefoot skiing

Barefoot skiing is water skiing behind a motorboat without the use of water skis, commonly referred to as "barefooting". Barefooting requires the skier to travel at higher speeds (30–45 mph/48–72 km/h) than conventional water skiing (20–35 miles per hour/32–56 km/h). The necessary speed required to keep the skier upright varies by the weight of the barefooter and can be approximated by the following formula: (W / 10) + 20, where W is the skier's weight in pounds and the result is in miles per hour. It is an act performed in show skiing, and on its own.

== History of barefooting ==
Barefoot water skiing originated in Winter Haven, Florida. According to the Water Ski Hall of Fame, and witnesses of the event, 17-year-old A.G. Hancock became the first person to barefoot water ski in 1947. That same year, Richard Downing "Dick" Pope Jr., was the first person to be photographed barefooting, stepping off his skis on a training boom alongside the boat. In 1950, the first barefoot competition was held in Cypress Gardens, with Pope and Mexican competitor Emilio Zamudio as the only two known barefooters in the world at the time. The first woman to waterski barefoot was Charlene Zint in 1951.

Throughout the 1950s, additional barefoot starting techniques were invented including the two-ski jump out, the beach start (invented by Ken Tibado in 1955), and the deep water start (invented by Joe Cash in 1958). The tumble-turn maneuver was 'invented' by accident during a double barefoot routine in 1960 when Terry Vance fell onto his back during a step-off and partner Don Thomson (still on his skis) spun him around forward, enabling Vance to regain a standing posture. In 1961, Randy Rabe became the first backward barefooter by stepping off a trick ski backwards, a maneuver Dick Pope had first tried in 1950 but vowed never to try again after a painful fall. The early 1960s saw Don Thomson appear as the first "superstar" of the sport, developing both back-to-front and front-to-back turnarounds, and performing the first barefoot tandem ride in a show at Cypress Gardens.

During this time barefooting began developing in Australia as well. In April 1963, the first national competition was held in Australia, with 38 competitors. The Australians were the first to develop barefoot jumping, one of the three events in modern barefoot competition, as well as pioneer many new tricks. In November 1978, the first world championships were held in Canberra, Australia, where 54 skiers competed for a total of 10 different countries. Australians Brett Wing and Colleen Wilkinson captured the men's and women's titles. In 1976 Briton Keith Donnelly set the first (officially recognized) World Barefoot Jump record of 13.25 meters.

== Equipment ==
Equipment required for barefooting:

- Boat – Barefooting requires a boat or other towing object that can travel to a speed of 30-45 mph with a barefooter under tow. Some boats are made specifically for barefooting, as they have small wakes and can travel at fast speeds. ABC Boats maintains a current list of boats approved by the American Barefoot Club.
- Handles and ropes – Normally a handled rope is used but may be optionally replaced with a ski boom (see below). A safety release may be used with the rope so that it can be detached from the boat in the event the barefooter becomes tangled in the rope. Though it is possible to barefoot with a normal 75.00-foot nylon tow rope and handle, many skiers use special ropes made out of Poly-E or Spectra to reduce spring. Barefoot handles have plastic tubing around them, so the skier can wrap their feet around the rope without getting rope burn and can have small modifications for frontward and backward toe holds. Beginners may prefer to use a longer rope, ranging from 75-100 feet long, to help them find smoother water outside the boat's wake.
- Personal Flotation Device – It is recommended and in many locations required that skiers and barefooters wear a flotation device or padded wetsuit.
- Helmet - In many locations, it is only required for jump.

Optional equipment:

- Barefoot wetsuit – The skier wears a fitted, padded neoprene barefoot wetsuit which has built-in flotation so that the need of a life jacket is unnecessary. It is possible to ski with a Coast Guard approved Type III flotation vest though this does not pad the skier well and the skier will not be able to perform many tricks.
- Padded shorts – Though not necessary, many barefooters wear padded neoprene shorts. These help pad the skier's buttocks which is very helpful in performing the deep water start and tumble turns.
- Booms – Barefoot booms are used for learning barefooting and also, learning new barefoot tricks. The boom is a long pole that hangs over the edge of the boat and allows the barefooter to ski directly alongside the boat. Because the pole is fixed the barefooter may lean his or her body weight onto the pole and recover from falls more easily than on a rope.
- Shoe Skis – Shoe skis may be used for training. Shoe skis are small 'skis' put on the foot that are only a few inches longer and wider than the skier's foot. Shoe skiing is performed at a much lower speed (approx 18.00 mph) than barefooting because of the increased lift provided by the surface area of the ski. As an intermediate step to barefooting, flat soled street shoes may also be worn. This provides more lift than bare feet, but a more similar experience to barefooting than actual wooden 'shoe skis'.

== Competition ==
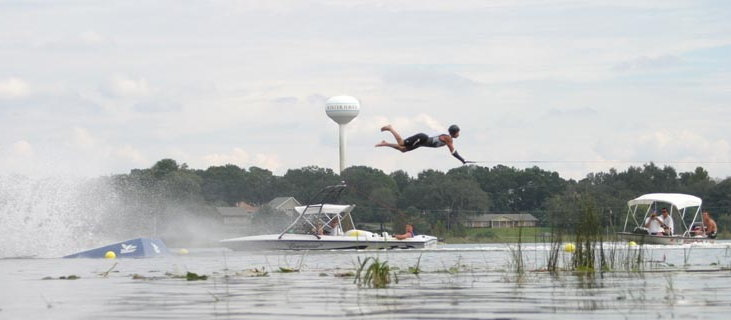
Barefoot Jumping

Barefoot water skiing has a competitive aspect which is very established. In traditional competition, there are three events:

- Tricks – The skier has two passes of 15 seconds to complete as many different tricks as possible. All tricks have specific point values depending on difficulty. The skier also is awarded points for the start trick they performed to get up. Mikey Caruso is the youngest barefoot water skier to ever compete longline in a tournament at the age of three at the 1988 Banana George Blairfoot Bananza, where he borrowed Parks Bonifay's wetsuit.

The current world record for Men's Open division is 13,350 points set by David Small on August 14, 2018,

For the Women's Open division the world record is 10,100 pts. set by Ashleigh Stebbeings on March 13, 2014.

In the Boy's division Jackson Gerard set a record of 12.850 points on July 28, 2018. It also counted as the Men's Open record until broken two weeks later by World Barefoot Center teammate David Small.

For the Girls division a record of 7400 points was set by Georgia Groen on April 1, 2013.

- Slalom – The skier has two passes of 15 seconds to cross the wake as many times as possible. The skier can cross the wake forwards or backwards and on two feet or one foot.

The world record for Men's Open division was set by Keith St. Onge on January 6, 2006 (20.6).

Ashleigh Stebbeings set the Women's Open division world record on October 8, 2014, with a score of 17.2 points.

The Boys division world record of 19.2 pts. was set on January 6, 2006, by Heinrich Sam. It was tied by Jackson Gerard on August 16, 2018.

Nadine De Villiers set the Girl's division world record of 16.1 pts. on April 5, 1997.

- Jump – The skier travels over a small, fiberglass jump ramp. They have three jumps and the longest one successfully landed counts. Professionals can jump as far as 90 feet (27 meters).

The current world record for Men's Open division of 29.9 meters (98 feet) was set by David Small on August 11, 2010.

With a jump of 23.4 meters (77 feet) Ashleigh Stebbeings set the Women's Open world record on February 19, 2017.

Tee-Jay Russo jumped 26.7 meters (88 feet) to set the Boy's division world record on December 29, 2018,

The Girl's division world record of 12.1 meters (40 feet) was set by Kim Rowswell on August 13, 2010.

Some other barefoot competitions feature endurance events. These include:

- Figure 8 – Two skiers on opposite sides of the wake ski while the boat drives in the pattern of a figure 8. The skier who is the last one standing wins.
- Team Endurance – This is a race between a variety of teams. Each team has a boat and the skiers take turns skiing. This generally takes place on a long river, where race distances can be up to about 45 miles. The first team to cross the finish line wins.

The newest form of Barefoot competition is an event which brings together all three events Tricks, Slalom and Jump into a single set.

== See also ==
- Cable skiing
- Hydrofoiling
- Wakeboarding
- Kneeboarding
