= Winter Haven Heights Historic Residential District =

Historic district in Florida, United States

- U.S. National Register of Historic Places
- U.S. Historic district
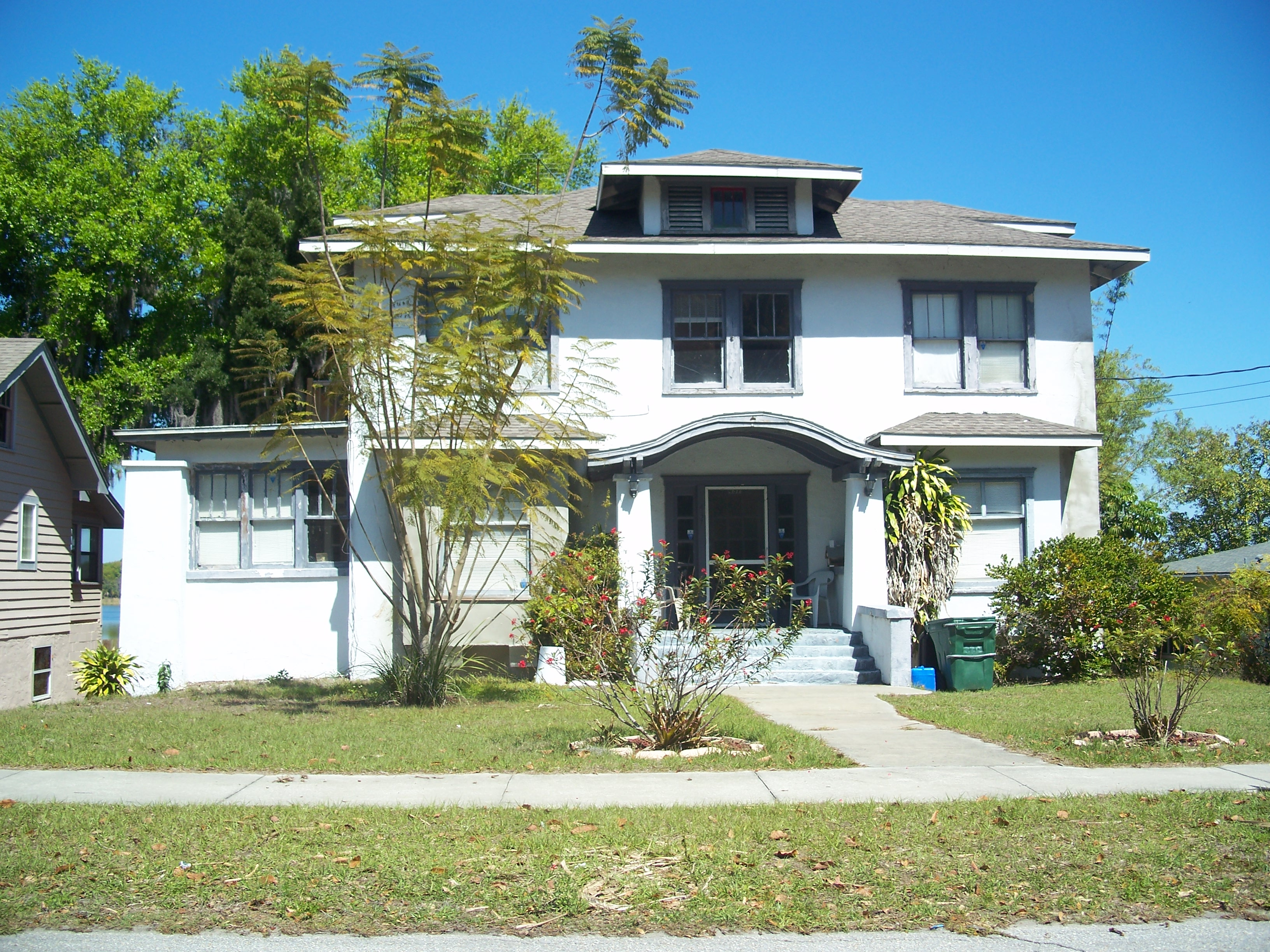

- Location within Florida Location within the United States
- Location: Winter Haven, Florida
- Coordinates: 28°1′27″N 81°43′22″W
- Area: 450 acres (1.8 km^{2})
- NRHP reference No.: 00000660
- Added to NRHP: June 15, 2000

The Winter Haven Heights Historic Residential District (also known as Winter Haven Heights Historic District) is a U.S. historic district in Winter Haven, Florida. It is roughly bounded by Lake Martha, 2nd Street Northeast, 5th Street Northeast, and Avenue A Northeast, encompasses approximately 450 acres (1.8 km^{2}), and contains 147 historic buildings. On June 15, 2000, it was added to the U.S. National Register of Historic Places.

== Gallery ==
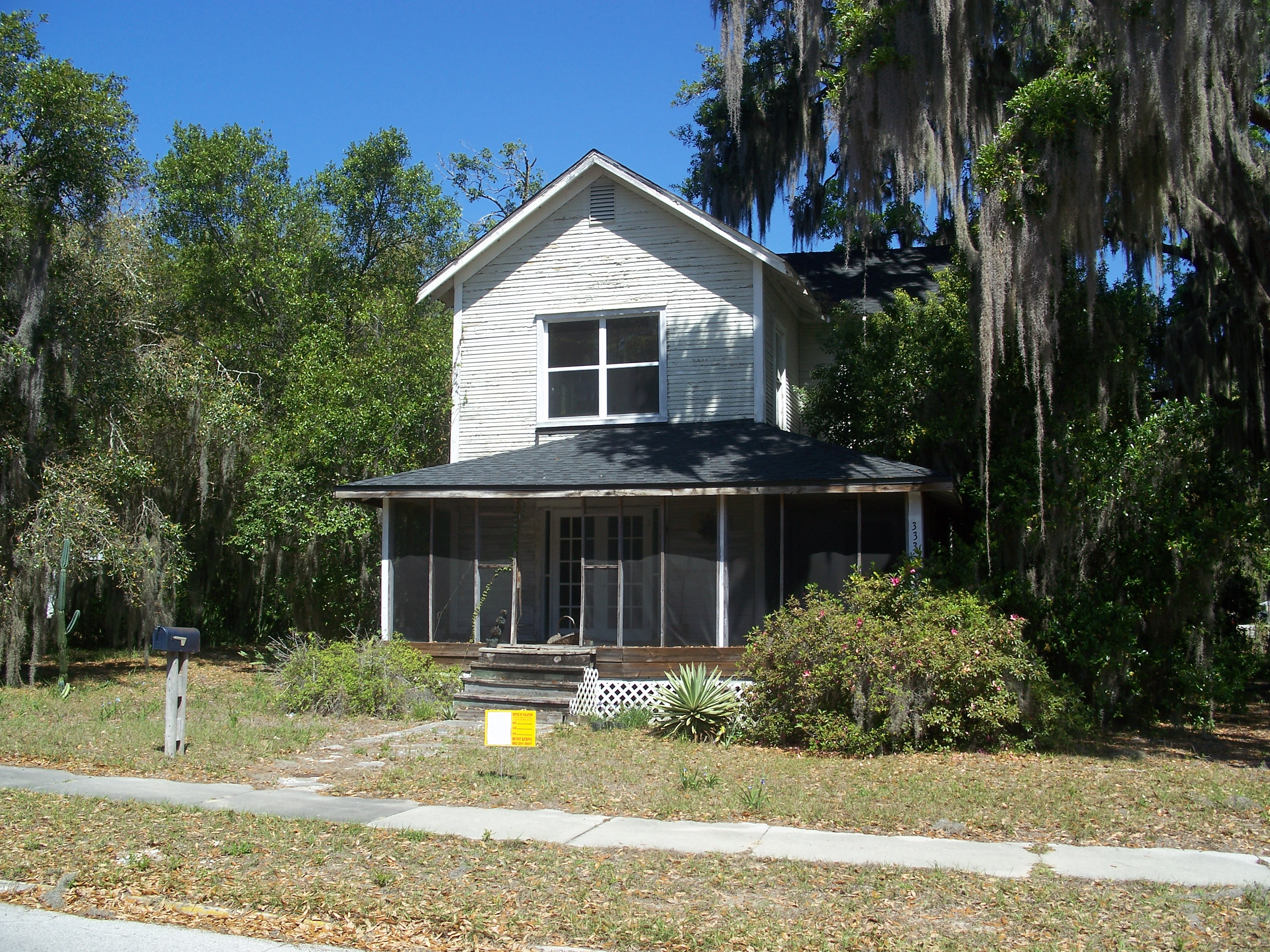

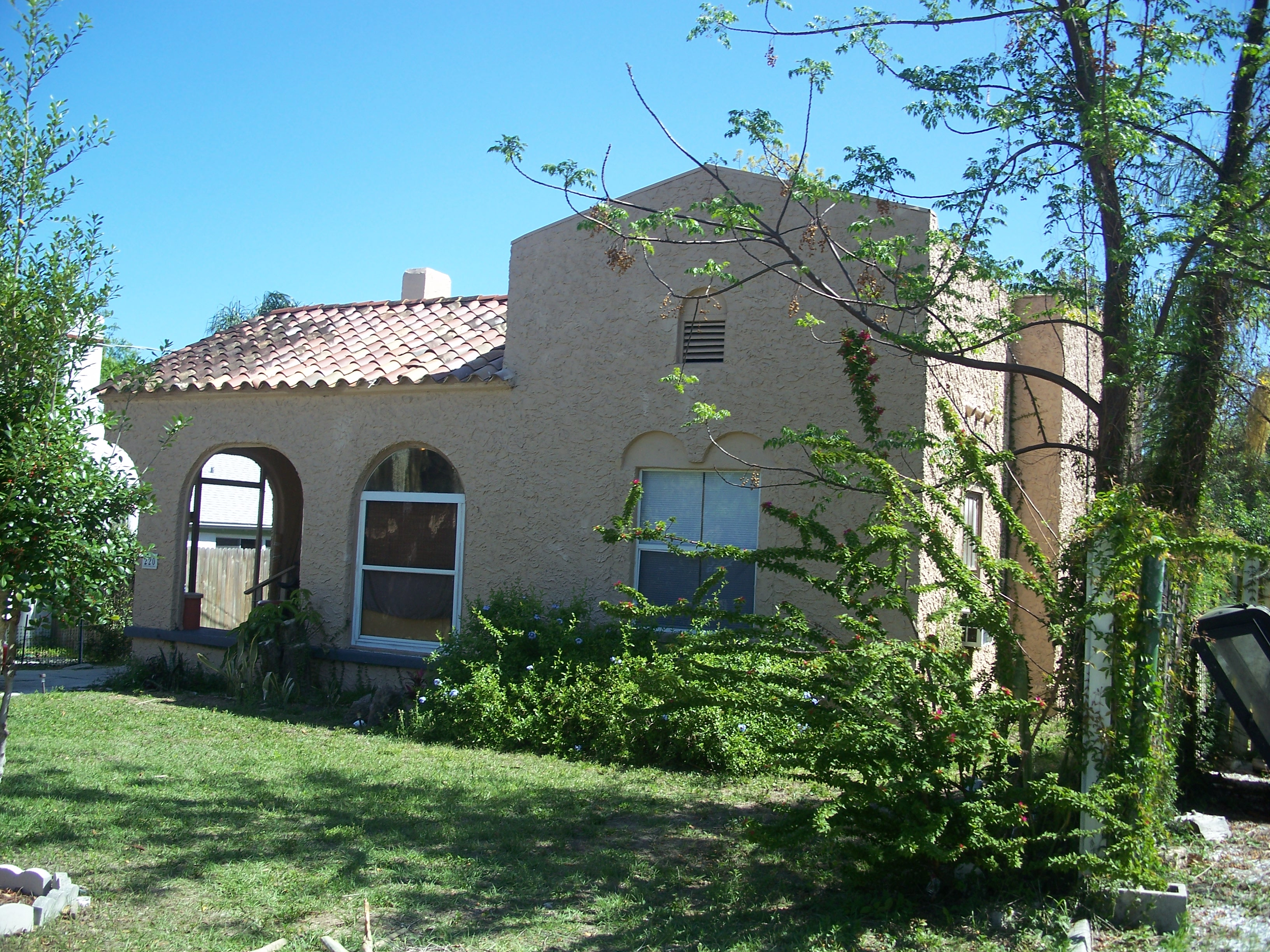

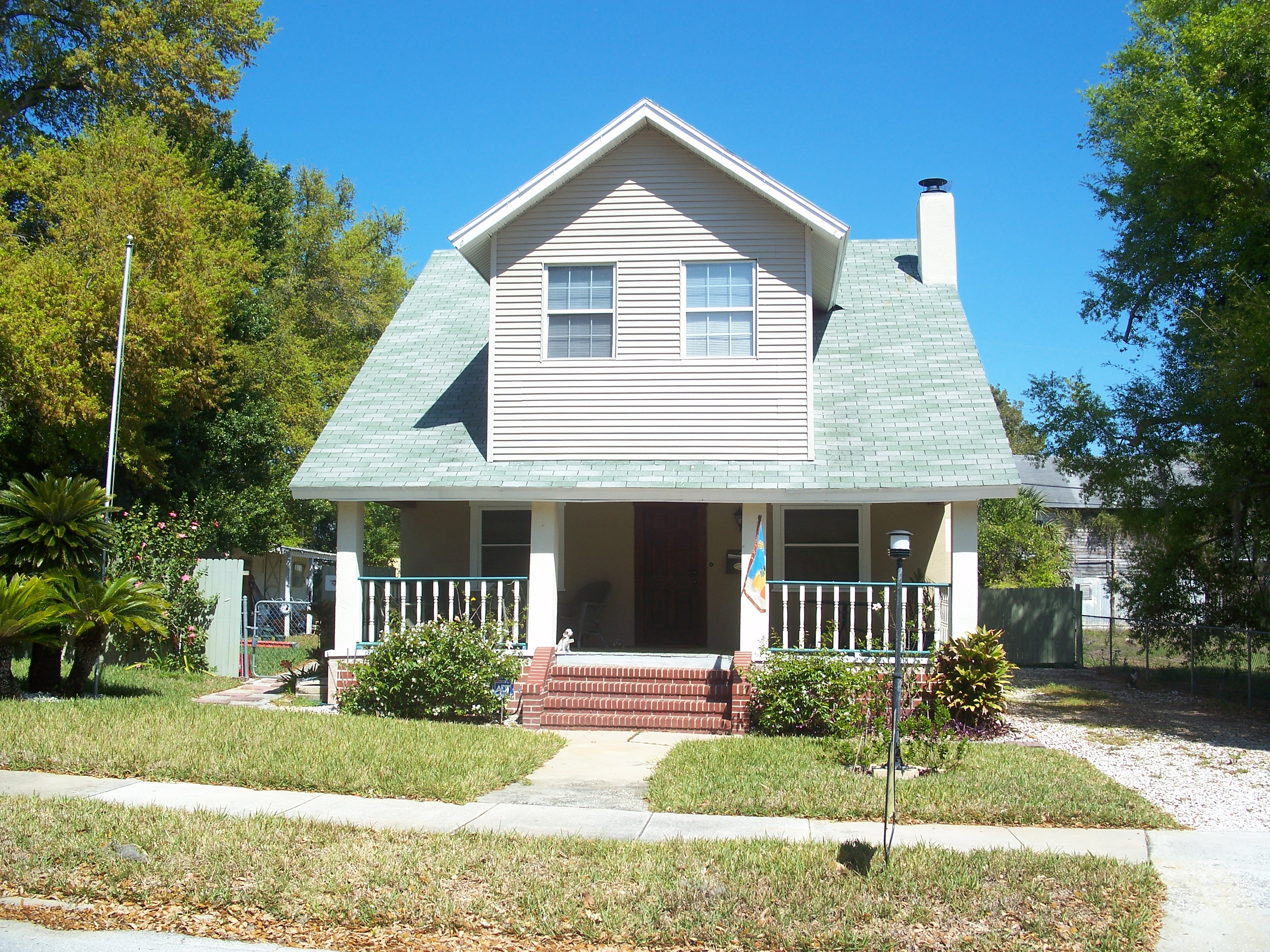

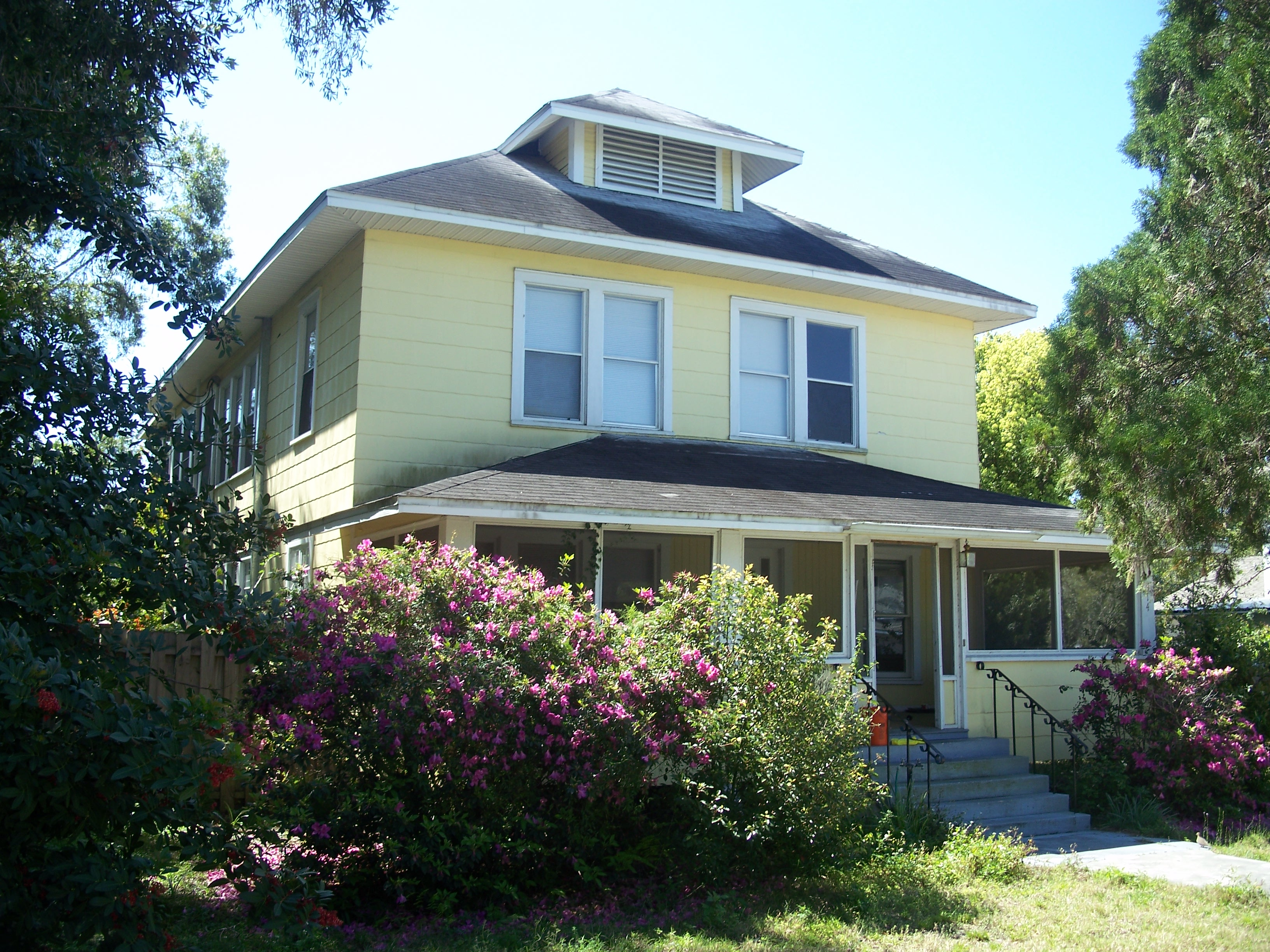

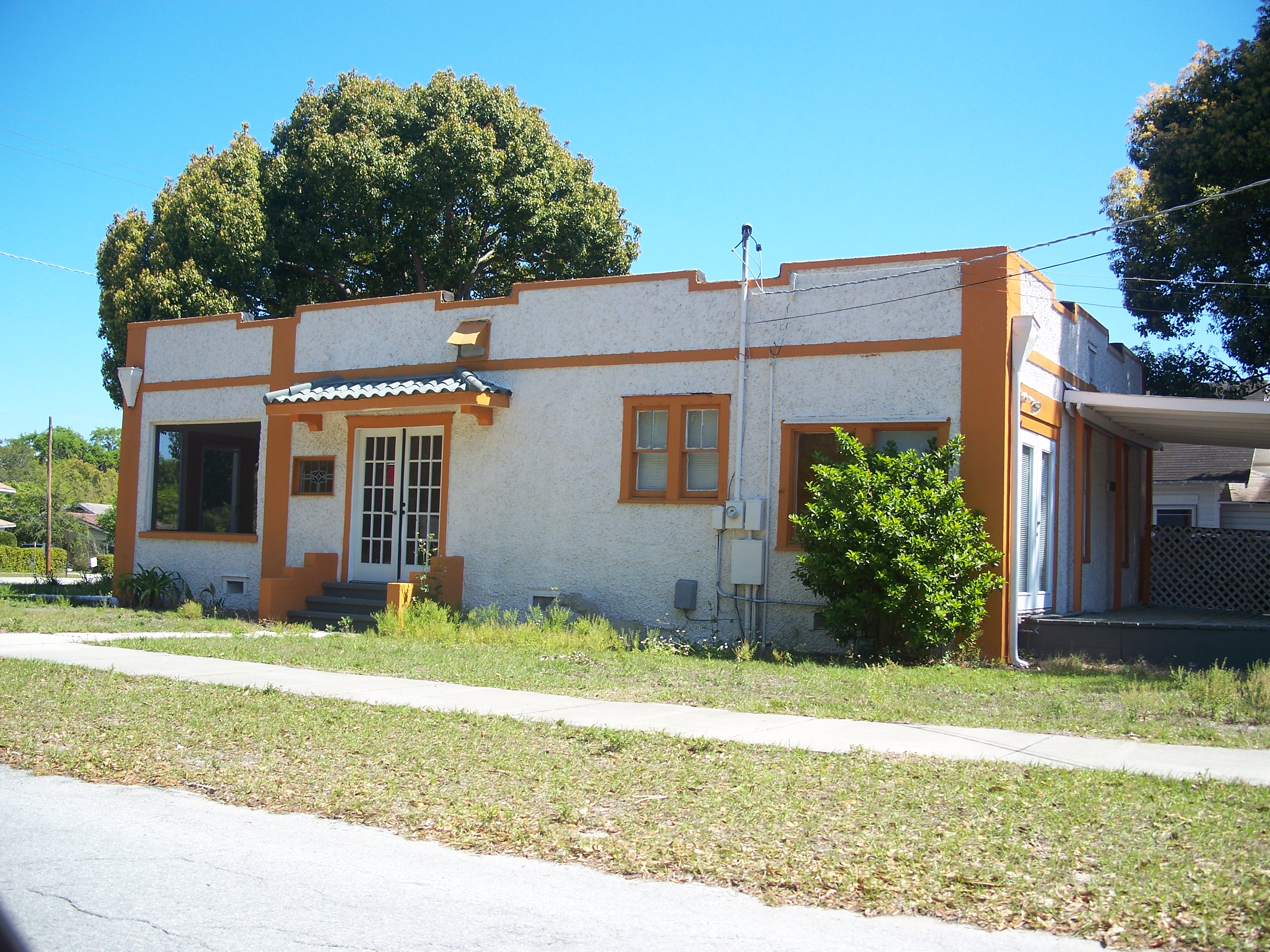

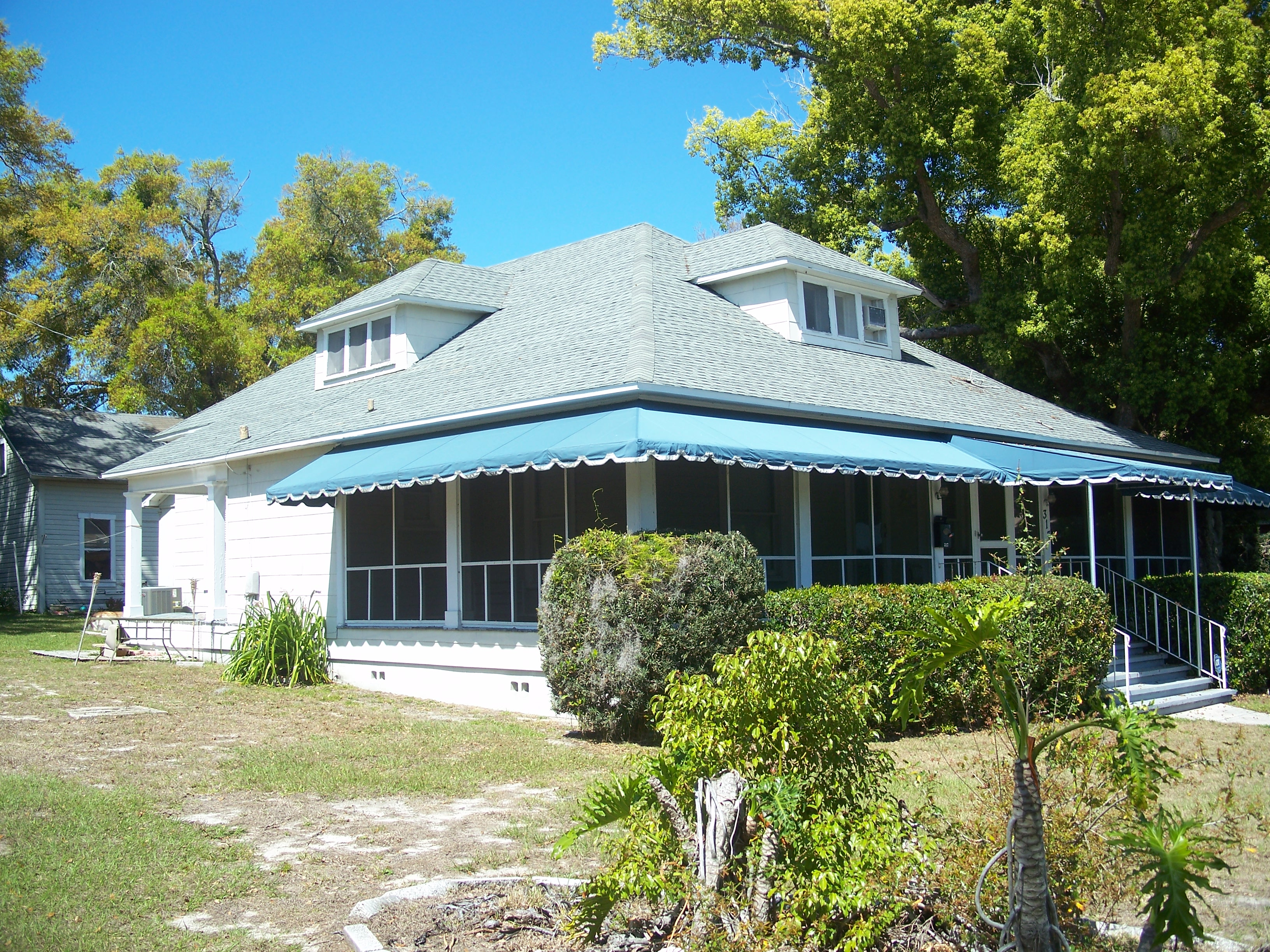
