= George A. Blair =

Personal information
- Nickname: "Banana" George
- Born: George Alfred Blair; January 22, 1915 Toledo, Ohio, U.S.
- Died: October 17, 2013 (aged 98) New York City, New York, U.S.
- Education: Miami University
- Spouses: Dorothy Spies (m. 1939) JoAnne White (m. 1973)

Sport
- Sport: Water Skiing
- Event: Barefoot skiing

George Alfred Blair (January 22, 1915 – October 17, 2013) was an American businessman, entrepreneur, and waterskier, known for his barefoot waterskiing and trademark yellow "banana"-like wetsuits.

== Biography ==
Blair was born on January 22, 1915, in Toledo, Ohio to Roy Robert and Georgia Gotshall Blair. He enrolled at Miami University, where he was a member of the Delta Upsilon fraternity. He graduated in 1937. With the Great Depression having taken its toll on the family finances, Blair often hopped a freight train to get back and forth to college. On one fateful trip aboard a freight train, Blair - guarding his food stash - was attacked by hobos, who tossed him off the moving train. "The fall exacerbated George's spinal condition, displacing his spine three-quarters of an inch and pinching a bundle of nerves. He lived with the injury and the resulting pain for years while resisting an operation to fuse his spine."

He was not exposed to water skiing until 1955. In Florida while recovering from a fusion operation on his back, Blair was inspired to try water skiing when he saw skiers at the Lyle Lee Ski School in Fort Lauderdale. It wasn't long before they convinced him to try waterskiing himself. He fell in love with it, and he and his family returned to New Jersey and opened two ski schools, which they successfully owned and operated for over 20 years.

Blair learned to ski on his bare feet when he was 46 years old. Since then, he won many awards and holds numerous records, including several entries in the Guinness World Records. Blair became the star of the Cypress Gardens daily water ski show - the longest running ski show in the world - in his hometown of Winter Haven, Florida. Upon his 91st birthday in 2006, Blair was named the Honorary Mayor of Cypress Gardens and was often seen thereafter donning the large yellow ribboned "Mayor" button he received. Blair continued his active lifestyle barefoot waterskiing and snowboarding until the age of 92. He then led a relatively quieter life at home in New York City, surrounded by family and following his passion for music by playing drums and attending jazz concerts. Blair died peacefully, at home, on October 17, 2013, at the age of 98.

== Personal life ==
In 1939, George married Dorothy Spies, of Detroit, and raised four daughters in Shrewsbury, New Jersey where he became a businessman and entrepreneur. In 1973, he married his second wife, JoAnne White, and the couple was married for over 40 years. One of water skiing's best-known couples, "Banana" George and JoAnne entertained and hosted countless national and international water skiing enthusiasts and champions in their homes in New Jersey, Florida, and New York City. Blair has four grandchildren, two great-granddaughters, and two great-grandsons.

== Scholarship ==
On October 18, 2013, the Banana George Blair family and the American Water Ski Educational Foundation (AWSEF) established the "George Blair Ambassador Scholarship" - an annual college scholarship, awarded to a young water skier who exhibits excellence on the water, in the classroom, and in serving as an ambassador for the sport. The scholarship continues Blair's well-established legacy as a generous supporter of the sport.

== Accolades ==
- 2003-2005—Guinness Book of World Records
- 2003—Named Water Ski Magazine Icon
- 2003—Order of Merit by the International Water Ski Federation
- 2003—Florida Sports Hall of Fame
- 2003—Polk County Sports Hall of Fame
- 1991—American Water Ski Hall of Fame
- 1989—Trustee for Life, American Water Ski Educational Foundation
- 1988-1989—Guinness Book of World Records
- 1982, 1986, 1987, 1992—Man of the Year & Ambassador, American Barefoot Club

== See also ==
- Cypress Gardens A special tribute was held at Cypress Gardens on March 30, 2008
