= Denison Field =

Baseball field in Winter Haven, Florida

Coordinates: 28°0′2″N 81°43′39″W

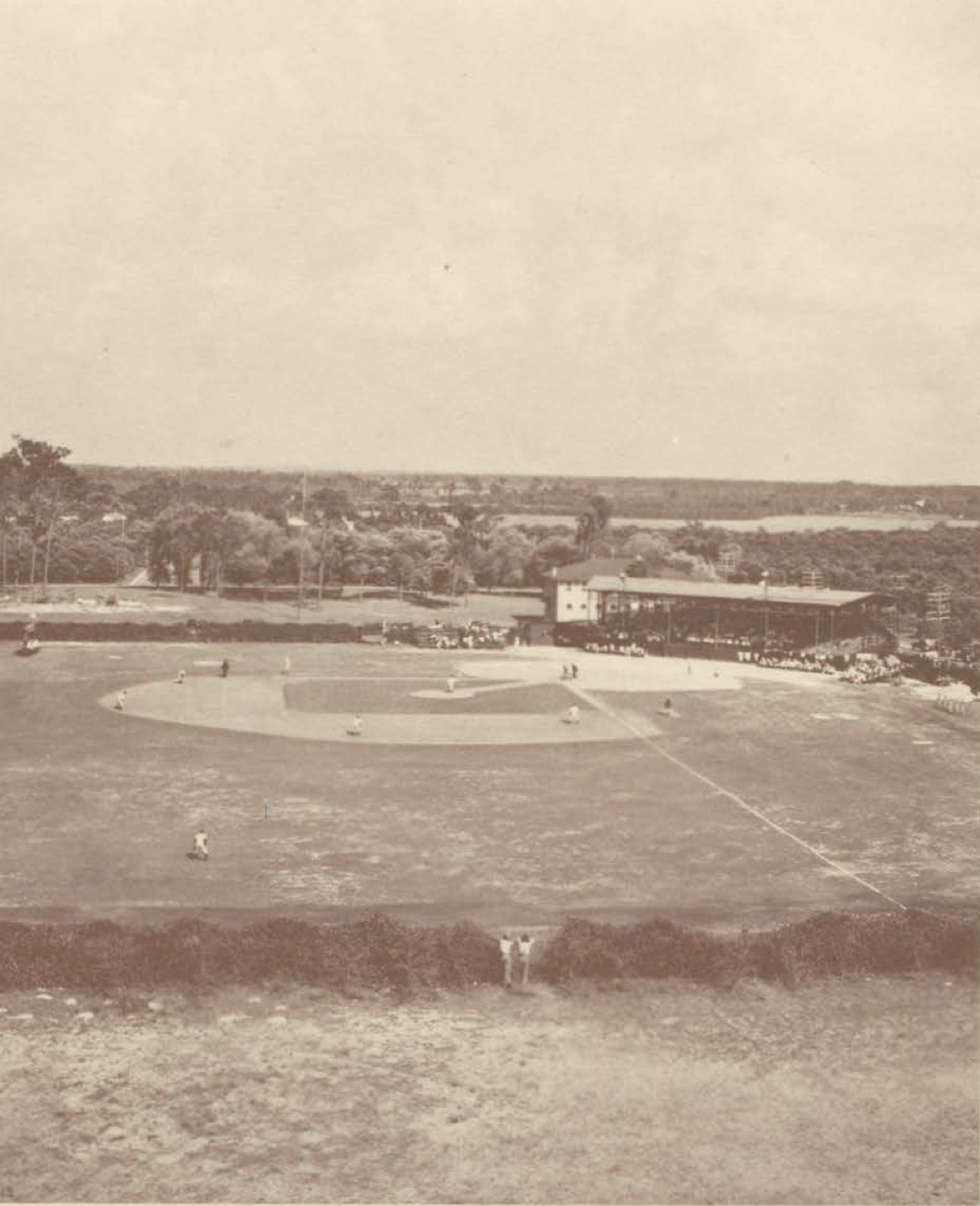
- Denison Field, Winter Haven, Florida in 1930s
- Interactive map of Denison Field
- Location: 400 Ave A SE; Winter Haven, Florida 33880
- Surface: Grass

Construction
- Opened: 1928
- Closed: 1940

Tenants
- Philadelphia Phillies (spring training) (1928–1937); New York Giants (spring training) (1940)

Denison Field was a baseball field in Winter Haven, Florida. The stadium was built in 1928 with a wooden grandstand. It was the spring training home of the Philadelphia Phillies from 1928 to 1937, and the New York Giants in 1940.

The field was located just west of the current site of the National Guard Armory at the intersection of Avenue C and Sixth St Southeast. The location is the current site of high school football field, Denison Stadium.

The distance from home plate to the right field fence was "over 400 feet", and the distances to center and left field even greater.

The Giants attracted 15,743 paying fans during sixteen games in 1940 and children were admitted free.

== Denison Stadium ==
Denison Field was replaced on the site by Denison Stadium, which was built for $40,000 and dedicated at a football game on October 17, 1947. The project originated in June 1947 under the direction of the local quarterback club, architect Jean Knox, funds chairman Harry E. King and building committee chairman C.N. McElbery.

The stadium has since been upgraded and continues in use.
