= Citrus Connection =

Public transit system of Lakeland, Florida, US

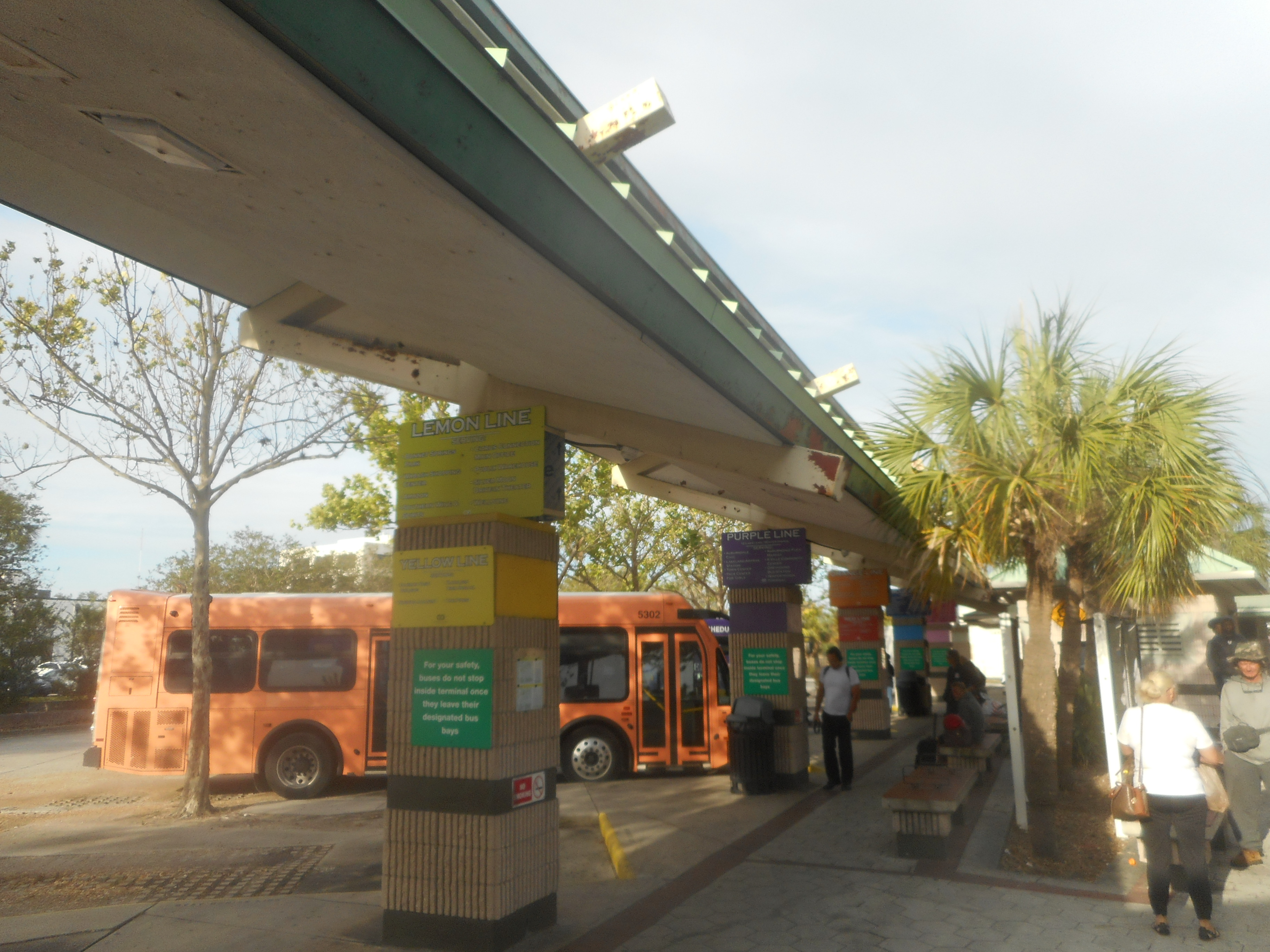
- Downtown Lakeland Bus Terminal
- Service area: Polk and Osceola Counties, Florida
- Service type: bus service, paratransit
- Website: www.ridecitrus.com

Citrus Connection is the public transit system of Lakeland, Florida, operated by the Lakeland Area Mass Transit District (LAMTD). The system operates a fleet of 33 buses on 14 routes in the Lakeland area, including service provided for Winter Haven Area Transit to the neighboring cities of Auburndale, Winter Haven and Bartow.

The system also operates paratransit service with 15 Handy buses.

Citrus Connection has operated since 1982. LAMTD is financed by a property tax and by funding from federal, state and city government.

In September 2008, the Polk Transit Authority was established with a view to the eventual consolidation of the LAMTD and Winter Haven Area Transit, and the extension of transit service throughout Polk County.

== Routes ==
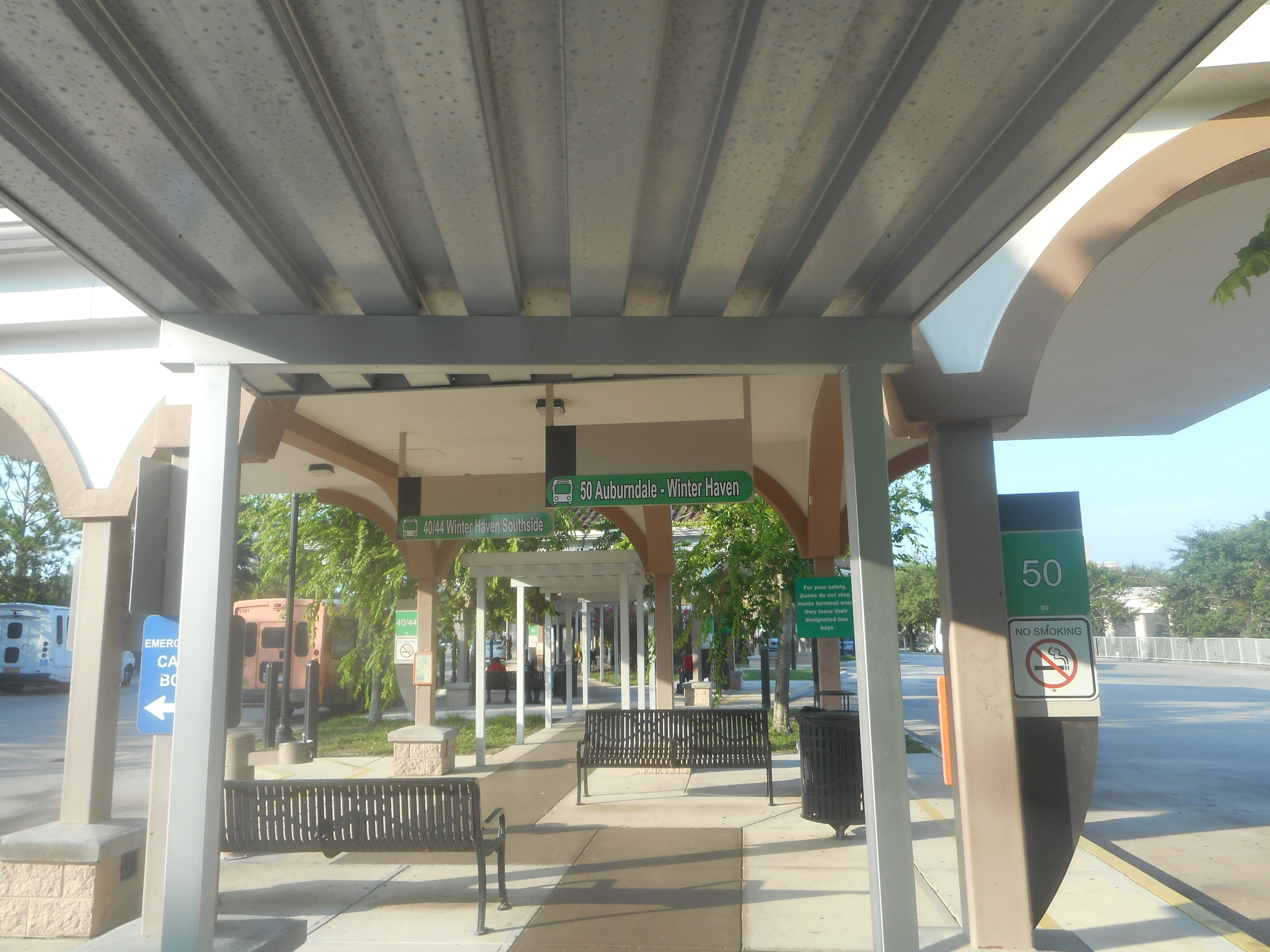
Winter Haven Transit Terminal at 555 Ave E NW, Winter Haven

West County Routes

- Pink Line
- Blue Line 1 & 2
- Circulator Eastside & Westside
- Coral Line
- Gold Line
- Green Line
- Lemon Line
- Lime Flex
- Route 21X West
- Orange Line
- Peach Line
- Purple Line
- Red Line
- Silver Line
- Yellow Line
- Squeeze Night Service
- Squeeze Day Service
- Lunch Squeeze

East County Routes

- Route 15 - Winter Haven/Haines City
- Route 16X - Haines City/Poinciana Express
- Route 17X - Lake Wales/Haines City Express
- Route 18X - Posner Park/Four Corners Express
- Route 19X - Posner Park/Poinciana Express
- Route 20X - Haines City/Davenport Express
- Route 21X E - Bartow/Lake Wales
- Route 21X W - Bartow/Mulberry/Ft. Meade
- Route 22X W - Winter Haven - Bartow
- Route 25 - Bartow/Fort Meade
- Route 27X - Dundee/Eagle Ridge Mall
- Route 30 - Legoland
- Lake Wales Circulator
- Route 40/44 - Winter Haven Southside
- Route 50 Auburndale
- Route 60 - Winter Haven Northeast
- Route 603 - Southwest Poinciana (on demand)
