= Downtown Winter Haven Historic District =

Historic district in Florida, United States

- U.S. National Register of Historic Places
- U.S. Historic district
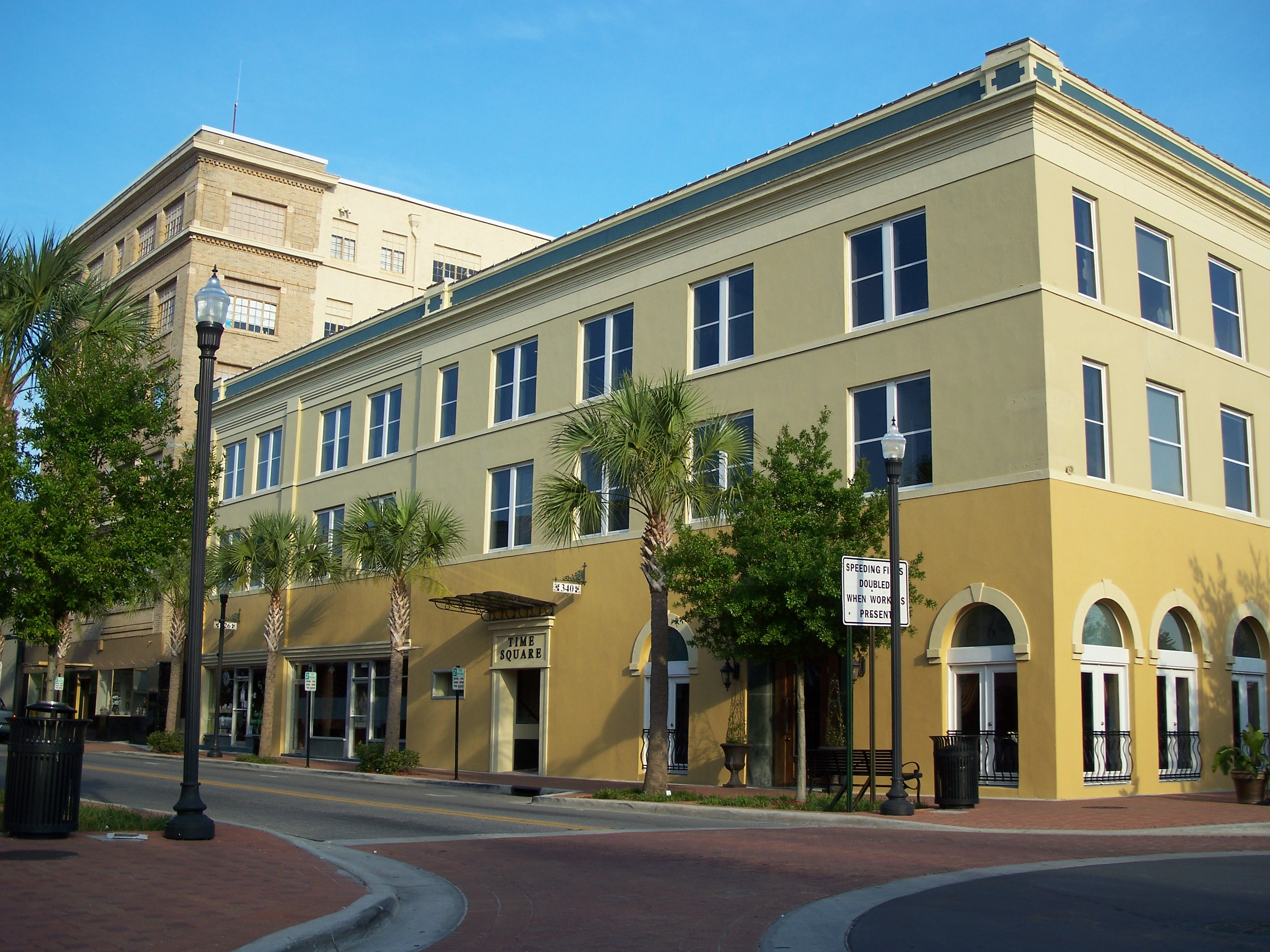

- Location within Florida Location within the United States
- Location: Winter Haven, Florida
- Coordinates: 28°1′18″N 81°43′49″W
- Area: 150 acres (0.61 km^{2})
- NRHP reference No.: 01001414
- Added to NRHP: February 4, 2002

The Downtown Winter Haven Historic District is a U.S. historic district (designated as such on February 4, 2002) located in Winter Haven, Florida. The district is bounded by roughly Avenue A Northwest, Avenue A Southwest, 3rd and 5th Streets. It contains 26 historic buildings.

== Gallery ==
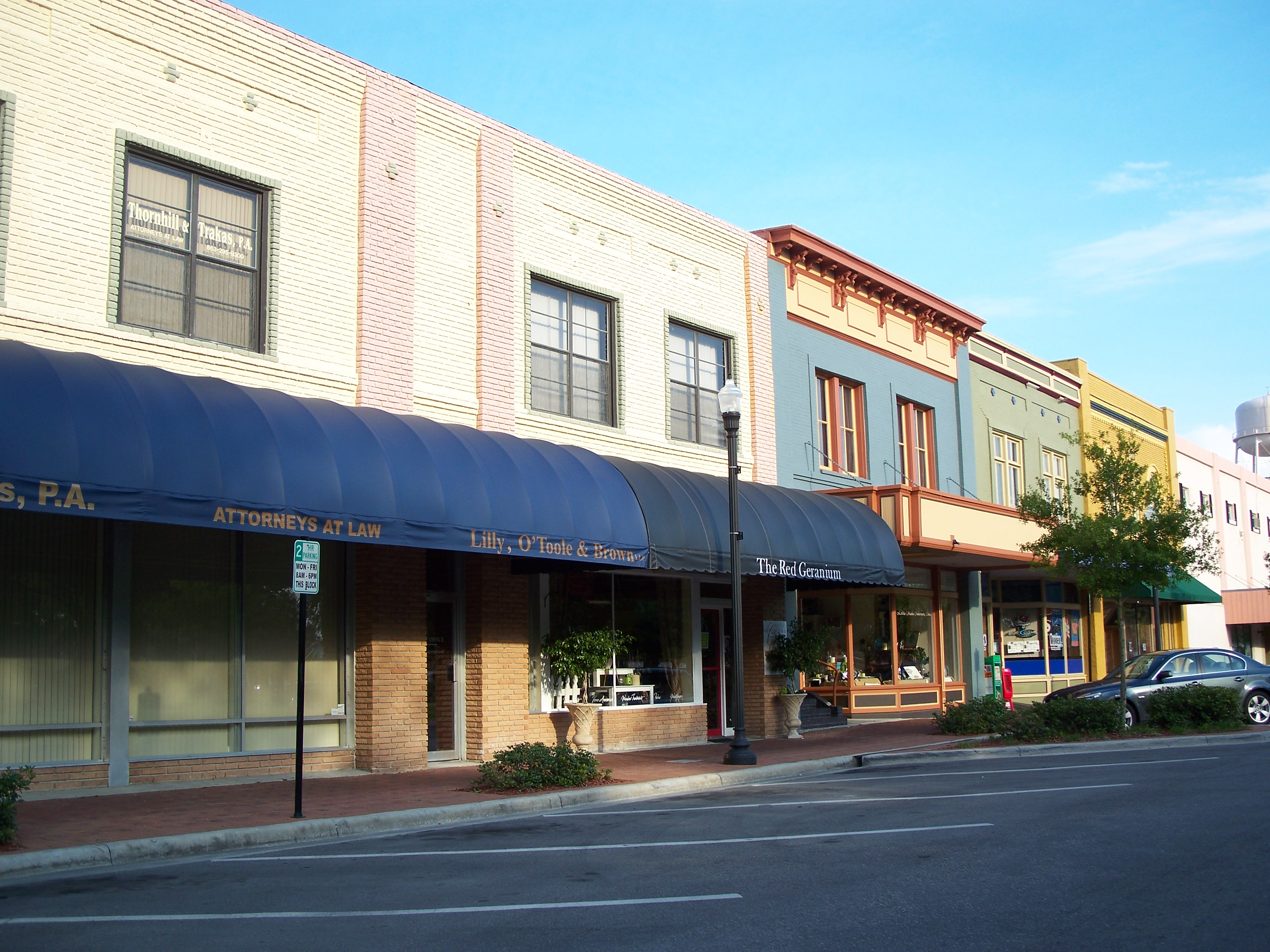

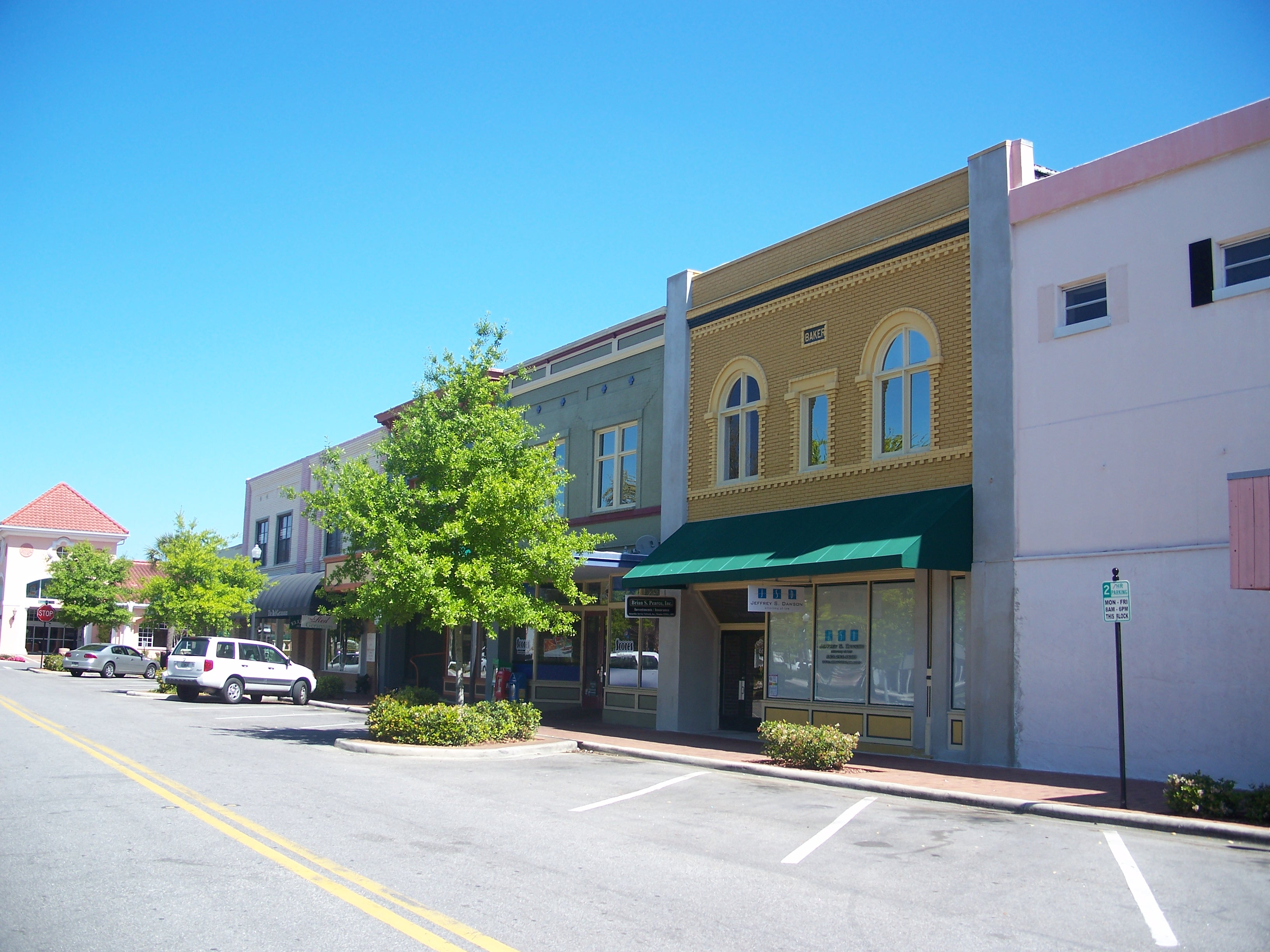

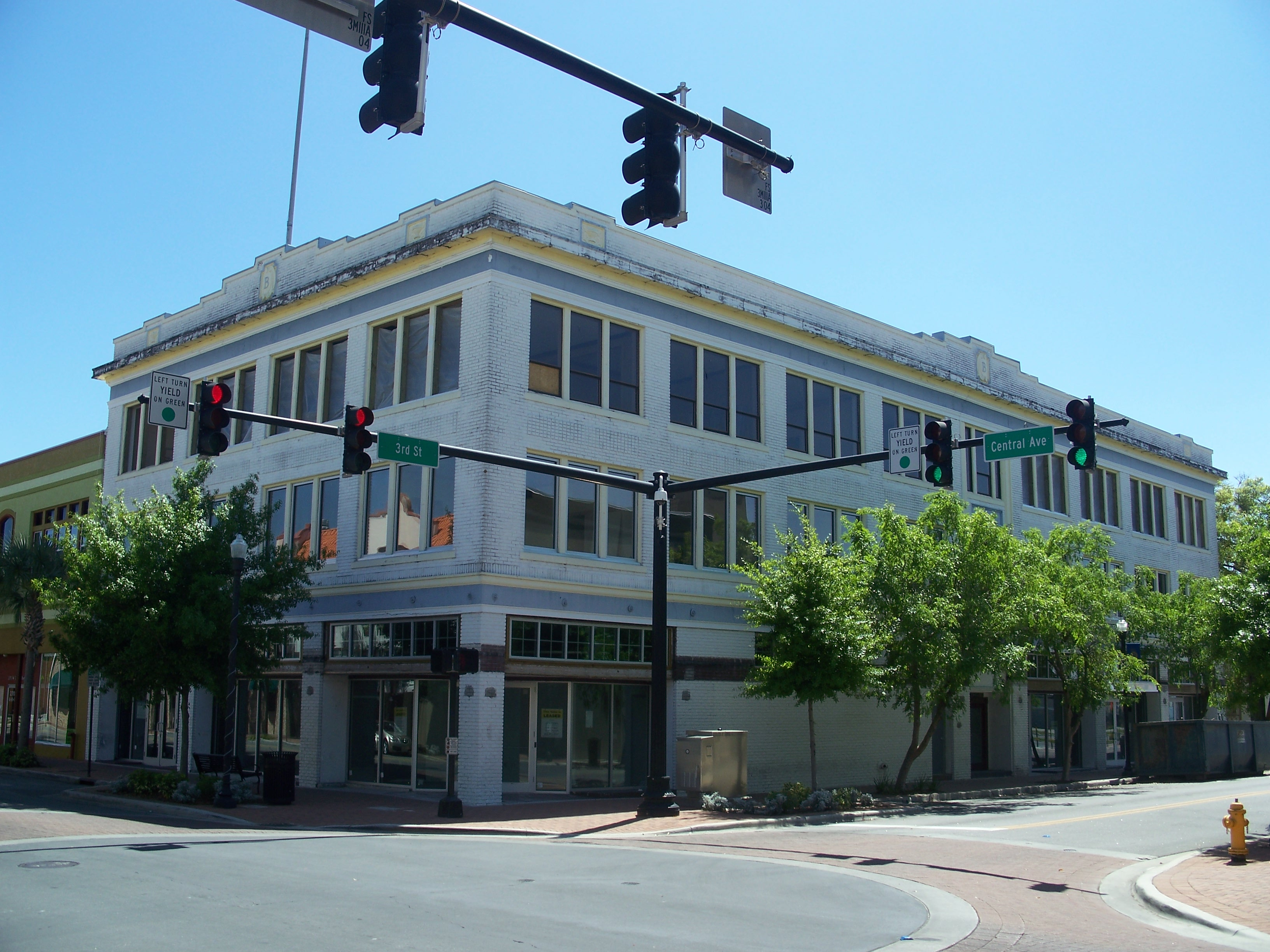

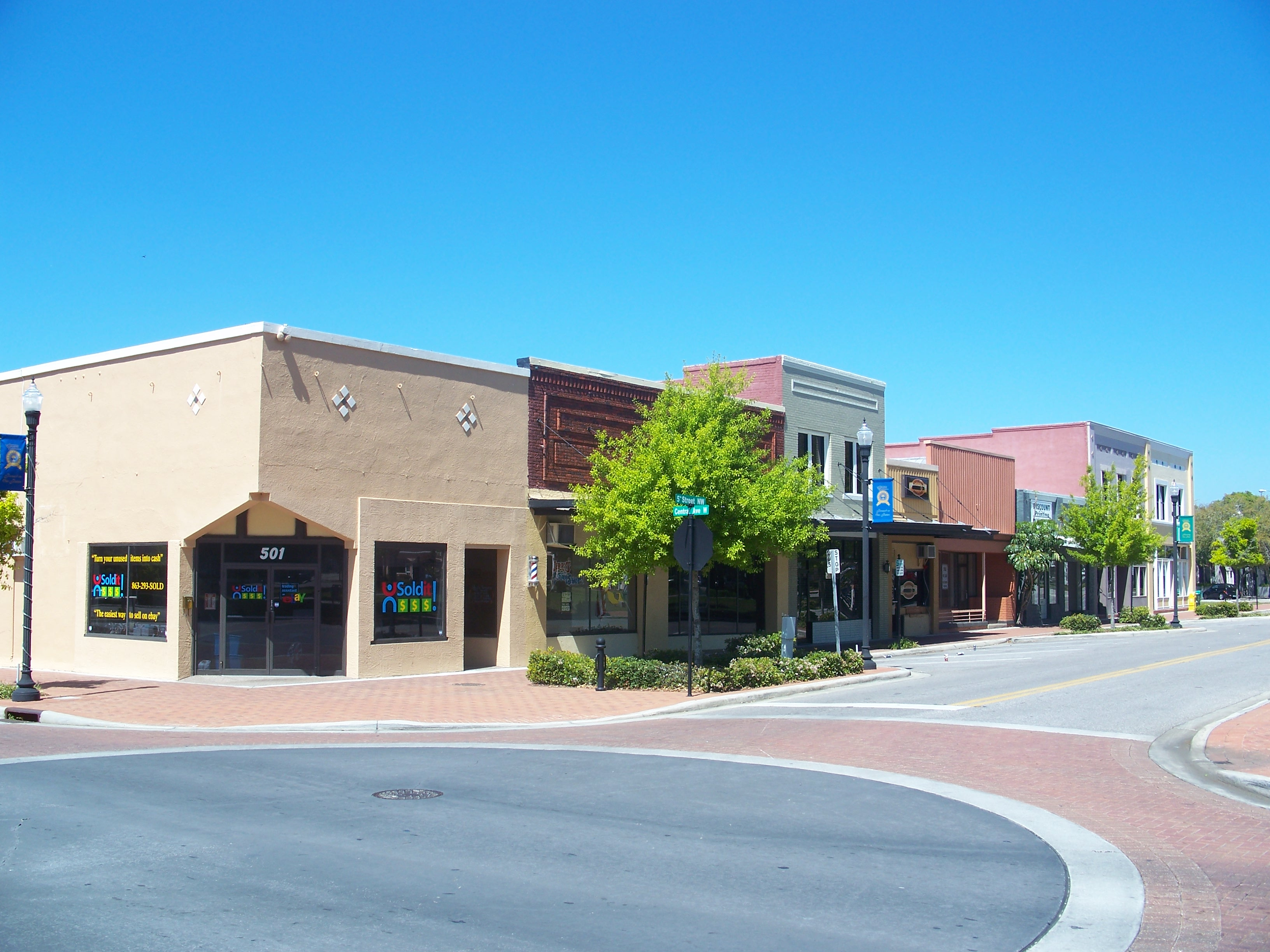
