= John A. Snively =

American businessman

John Snively
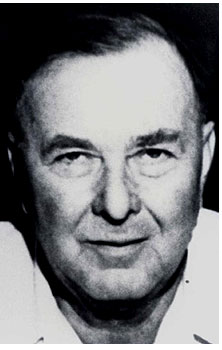
- Born: John Andrew Snively; 1889; Schellsburg, Pennsylvania, U.S.
- Died: January 22, 1958 (aged 68–69); Winter Haven, Florida, U.S.
- Occupation: Founder of Snively Groves Inc
- Spouse: Dorothy DeHaven Snively
- Children: 3

John Andrew Snively (1889 – January 22, 1958) was an American farmer, businessman, and citrus grower in Florida and Georgia who was an original inductee into the Florida Citrus Hall of Fame. At one point, his companies were responsible for one-third of the Florida citrus crop.

== Biography ==
Snively was born in 1889 in Schellsburg, Pennsylvania, the son of Frank B. Snively and Laura Irvin Snively. In 1910, at the age of twenty-one, he moved to Winter Haven, Florida, where he began working as a fertilizer salesman.

A few years later, just before the Florida land boom of the 1920s, Snively bought his first grove, a ten-acre site near Lake Eloise in Winter Haven.

In 1934, he established the Polk Packing Company, which later became Snively Groves Inc. Snively Groves was the largest fruit packing and canning company in the United States during the 1930s; with 1,500 employees, it was the largest business in Winter Haven.

With the outbreak of World War II, the citrus industry boomed. The demand for canned and packaged citrus fruit from the United States and other Allied Nations greatly exceeded growers ability to supply the fruit. The Allies were willing to purchase all of the canned fruit that could be produced at any price. Citrus prices skyrocketed, and Snively Groves experienced massive growth.

After World War II, the citrus industry began to experience wild fluctuations in market prices. At times, the price of citrus fruit fell below the cost of production. Snively recognized that citrus growers had to organize to stabilize market prices and create quality control standards and, under his leadership, growers created the Florida Citrus Mutual. Snively later served as President of the Florida Citrus Exchange.

Snively also served on the boards of the Tavares and Gulf Railroad and the Winter Haven Exchange National Bank. He served a three-year term as City Commissioner and built several housing sub-divisions on some of his grove land, including the Winter Haven communities of Inwood and Eloise Woods. John A. Snively Elementary School, on Snively Avenue, in Winter Haven, Florida is named after him.

Snively was married to Dorothy DeHaven Snively, and had one son and two daughters, one of whom, Avis, was the mother of musician Gram Parsons. He died of a heart attack at the age of 68.
