= Winter Haven Area Transit =

Bus transportation provider in Winter Haven, Florida

- Locale: Winter Haven, Florida
- Service type: bus service, paratransit
- Website: Winter Haven Area Transit

Winter Haven Area Transit is a bus system based in Winter Haven, Florida. The system operates 9 of its own buses, and another 4 buses are provided for WHAT by the Citrus Connection. There are 8 routes serving Winter Haven, Auburndale, Lakeland, Lake Alfred, Haines City, Lake Wales, Frostproof, Bartow, Dundee and Fort Meade.

Winter Haven Area Transit was started in 1999 by Lawrence Francis Murphy. It is a joint venture between the Board of County Commissioners of Polk County and the City of Winter Haven. In 2015 WHAT was merged with the Lakeland Area Mass Transit District by the Polk Transit Authority into a single countywide system operating as Citrus Connection.

== Route list ==
- 12 / Purple Line

Winter Haven to Lakeland

- 15 Winter Haven to Haines City
- 16x Haines City to Poinciana
- 17x Lake Wales to Haines City Express
- 18x Haines City to Davenport Express
- 19x Loughman Flex
- 22XW Bartow Express
- 25 Bartow/Fort Meade
- 27x Dundee/Eagle Ridge Mall
- 30 LegoLand
- 35 Frostproof/Eagle Ridge Mall
- 40/44 Southwest
- 50 Auburndale
- 60 Northeast Winter Haven
- 603 Southwest Poinciana

== Bus fleet ==
- 1056-1059 | 2002 Gillig Phantom 30'
- T96-T100 | 2010 Gillig BRT 30'
- T116 | 2014 Eldorado EZ Rider II 30'
