= Winter Haven High School =

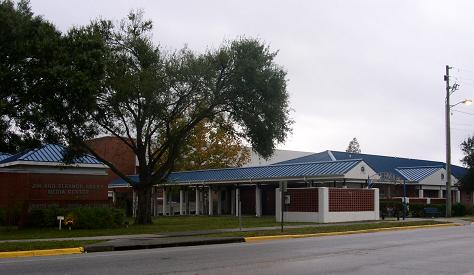

Location
- 600 Sixth Street, SE; Winter Haven, Polk County, Florida 33880; United States; 28.0136507°N 81.7182482°W

Information
- Funding type: Public
- Motto: Blue Devil
- Founded: 1886
- School district: Polk County Public Schools
- Principal: Ronda Cotter
- Teaching staff: 111.00 (FTE)
- Student to teacher ratio: 23.00
- Colors: Blue and Gold
- Slogan: "Blue Devils for life"
- Mascot: Blue Devils
- Rival: Auburndale High School
- Website: https://winterhavenhigh.polkschoolsfl.com/

Winter Haven High School is a four-year public high school located in Winter Haven, Florida, a city of 27,855 (2004 census).

== History ==
The school opened in 1886 on the second floor of Boyd's Hall, currently where City Hall stands. In 1890, a frame school building was built at the corner of Central Avenue and First Street.

When the student population reached 200 in 1912, more space was added onto the structure. Three years later a brick building replaced the wood-framed ones to make room for all elementary and high school students in 12 grades.

In 1922, an eight-room structure for the high school was built on Fourth Street, the present annex (demolished in Winter/Spring 1971) at Denison Junior High School. In 1925 a large stucco building (also now demolished) was built on the adjacent lot for the high school, and the smaller building became a junior high department.

The current structure was built on Sixth Street in 1955 on a 32-acre (130,000 m^{2}) tract of land. The late 1980s and 1990s saw a tremendous expansion of the campus, including a new gymnasium, which opened in the spring of 1986, along with he music building and administrative offices.

The full reconstruction of the school commenced in the fall of 2009. Most of the original campus (not including the auditorium, which was the original gymnasium, buildings 1, 5, 6, 21, 25) was demolished and replaced with a total of four new buildings (33, 34, 35, 36). An estimated 24 million dollars was spent on the construction and the new building boast two stories, new laboratories, kitchens, and art rooms.

Most recently, it was announced on January 4, 2012, that Winter Haven High School became a "B" school. This was a major achievement and showed that school was and still is making progress as it continues to be a "B" school.

The School also offers the Cambridge Program from the university of Cambridge in England. It is a great program that offers students an opportunity for worldwide leading universities.

The school held a “Celebrate Blue and Gold” event Sept. 15, 2006 to mark the school's 120th anniversary.

== Athletics ==
The girls basketball team won the state championship in 2005, 2007, 2016, 2017, 2018, and recently in 2025. In 2015 the school made their first ever girls weightlifting team.

== Pride of Winter Haven ==
The WHHS band program, which dates from 1936, consists of the "Pride of Winter Haven" Marching Band, including the Devilettes Dance Team and Colorguard, the Symphonic and Wind Ensemble, "Messengers" Jazz Band, Percussion Ensemble and many student-led ensembles.

The Winter Haven High School Marching Band, also known as "The Pride of Winter Haven," performs at football games, marching band competitions, community events and local and national parades. It has performed in many national events, including the Washington DC National Cherry Blossom Parade in the 1960s, the 1979 Tournament of Roses Parade, the Macy's Thanksgiving Day Parade in 1993 and then later in 1998 St. Patrick's Day Parade in New York City. In 2011 they received their 12th consecutive FBA "Straight Superiors" at the District 12 marching competition.

The Symphonic Band performed at Carnegie Hall in New York City on May 24, 2008, with two other ensembles, The Caltech-Occidental Concert Band from California and Jackson High School Wind Ensemble from Washington.

== Notable people ==
- James H. Ammons, former president of Florida A&M University
- Andre Berto, boxer
- Otis Birdsong, NBA basketball player
- Kenneth Brokenburr, Olympic sprinter
- Stephen Christian, vocalist for rock band Anberlin
- John Covington, football player
- Rowdy Gaines, swimmer, Olympic gold medalist, TV analyst
- John Michael Harrison, student 1979–1982, entrepreneur
- Tiffany Hayes, basketball player, class of 2008
- Scott Helvenston, former Navy SEAL
- Kent LaVoie, musician, songwriter, performed as Lobo in band with Gram Parsons and Jim Stafford titled The Rumours
- Trey Mancini, MLB baseball player for Baltimore Orioles
- Charlie Manning, professional baseball player (Washington Nationals)
- Joseph Milligan, guitarist for rock band Anberlin
- Tobias Myers, MLB Pitcher for Milwaukee Brewers
- Kathleen Parker, nationally syndicated columnist, class of 1969
- Gram Parsons, student in 1961–63, singer/songwriter and member of The Byrds, founder of The Flying Burrito Brothers, discoverer of Emmylou Harris
- Fred Ridley, golfer, U.S. Amateur and Walker Cup champion
- Jordan Schafer, major league outfielder for St. Louis Cardinals
- Jim Stafford, musician, songwriter, in band with Gram Parsons and Kent LaVoie titled The Rumours
- Max Strang, architect
- Sally Wheeler, actress
- Gary Wright, actor, singer, arts education presenter
