= Kenny Brokenburr =

American sprinter (born 1968)

Personal information
- Nationality: American
- Born: 29 October 1968 (age 57) Winter Haven, Florida, U.S.
- Height: 1.79 m (5 ft 10 1/2 in)
- Weight: 77 kg (170 lb; 12.1 st)

Sport
- Sport: Running
- Club: Nike

Achievements and titles
- Personal bests: 100 m: 10.04 s 200 m: 20.04 s
Medal record
Men's athletics
Representing United States
Olympic Games
Gold medal – first place	2000 Sydney	4 × 100 m relay
Pan American Games
Gold medal – first place	2003 Santo Domingo	200 m

Kenneth Brokenburr is an American former sprinter. He won an Olympic gold medal as part of the 4 × 100 meter relay team at the 2000 Summer Olympics in Sydney, Australia.

== Early life ==
Brokenburr was born on October 29, 1968, in Winter Haven, Florida. He grew up there and graduated from Winter Haven High School in 1987. After high school, Brokenburr matriculated to Wayland Baptist College in Plainview, Texas. There, as a sophomore in 1989, he became the NCAA Division II champion in the 200 meter dash. In 1991, this time as a senior for St. Augustine's College in Raleigh, North Carolina, Brokenburr became the NCAA Division II champion in the 100 meter dash.

After trying out for the 1992 Summer Olympics in Barcelona, Spain, Brokenburr took a hiatus from running that lasted from 1993 to 1995.

== Professional career ==
In 1996, Brokenburr returned to track and field as a professional runner. He acted as his own agent, used George Williams as his coach, and was sponsored by Nike.

By 1997, Brokenburr reduced his personal best time in the 100 meter dash to 10.04 seconds. For this, he achieved his first national ranking (#10) among U.S. runners in the 100. Three years later, in 2000, Brokenburr moved up to #5 among U.S. runners in the 100 meter dash and #7 in the 200 meter dash. During this time, he set another personal best by running the 200 in 20.04 seconds.

On July 15, 2000, while qualifying for the 2000 Summer Olympics in Sydney, Australia, Brokenburr finished fifth out of eight runners in the final Olympic trial for the 4 × 100 meter relay. This earned him a spot to run on the U.S. national track and field team for the first time in his career, but he only ran a few trial heats in preparation of the 4 × 100 meter final in that year's Olympics while in Sydney. However, the team that did run finished in first place, and Brokenburr received a gold medal from the team's effort. It was his sole Olympic medal.

== Post-Olympic Career ==
Brokenburr currently resides in Auburndale, Florida, a small town adjacent to his hometown of Winter Haven.
