= Lake Martha (Minnesota) =

Lake in the state of Minnesota, United States

- Location within Minnesota
- Location: Chisago County, Minnesota
- Coordinates: 45°22′25″N 92°53′46″W
- Type: lake

Lake Martha is a lake in Chisago County, Minnesota, in the United States.

Lake Martha was named for an early settler.

== See also ==
- List of lakes in Minnesota
