= Don Thomson =

Barefoot skiing pioneer

- Born: October 14, 1941 (age 84)
- Citizenship: United States, Canada
- Organization: Cypress Gardens
- Known for: back to front turns, tumbleturns, back barefooting

Don Thomson

Military service
- Branch/service: United States Army, United States Navy
- Rank: Commander

Don Cameron Thomson (born October 14, 1941) is an American water skier and a pioneer in the sport of barefoot skiing. He expanded early barefoot endurance records from 5 to over 30 minutes and introduced new maneuvers to the sport such as doubles barefooting, front to back and back to front turns, and participated in the development of the tumble turn with Terry Vance. Thomson was also a Master's rated 3 event skier, a proponent of water ski technology and of professional show skiing in the United States and Japan. He introduced backward barefooting to show skiing at Cypress Gardens in 1962, and was instrumental in the introduction of carbon fiber in molded skis, and the slalom fin.

During the Vietnam war, where Thomson served as a Navy helicopter pilot with HA(L)-3, he was noted for water skiing and teaching other soldiers to water ski in river combat zones of Vietnam, and behind LST vessels in the Gulf of Thailand.

A life size photograph of Thomson barefooting is featured in the Water Ski Hall of Fame and Museum where he was presented the Don-Thomson Award of Distinction in 2012.
