= Lake Martha (Florida) =

Lake in the United States

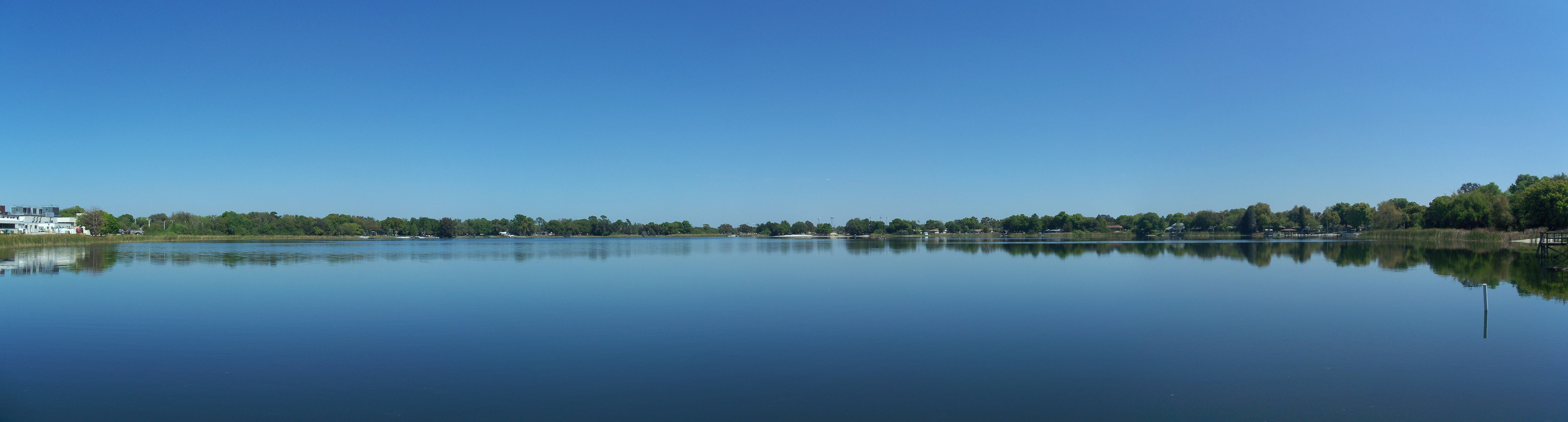
- Panoramic view of Lake Martha in March 2011.

- Location within Florida Location within the United States
- Location: Winter Haven, Florida
- Coordinates: 28.0292°N 81.7215°W
- Type: natural freshwater lake
- Basin countries: United States
- Max. length: 2,420 feet (740 m)
- Max. width: 2,025 feet (617 m)
- Surface area: 84.38 acres (34 ha)
- Surface elevation: 141 feet (43 m)

Lake Martha, oval in shape, is in the west-central part of Winter Haven, Florida. Lake Martha Drive surrounds two-thirds of the lake's perimeter. Lake Martha has a 84.38-acre (341,500 m^{2}) surface area. On the northeast is a public park and boat ramp and across the street from this park is the Winter Haven campus of Polk State College. Winter Haven Hospital is on the lake's west side and a public park is at the southwest side of the lake. Residential housing surrounds the rest of the lake.

This lake has no public swimming beaches, but it has one public boat ramp. Fishing may be done by boat or from the shores of the two public parks on the lake. The park on the southwest side of the lake has a public fishing dock, as well as two picnic shelterhouses and a playground. The Hook and Bullet website says Lake Martha contains largemouth bass, rainbow trout and yellow perch. One person commented on the Fishing Works website that the fishing at the lake was good and that in four hours he caught seventeen largemouth bass.
