= Winter Haven, Florida =

- City
- City of Winter Haven
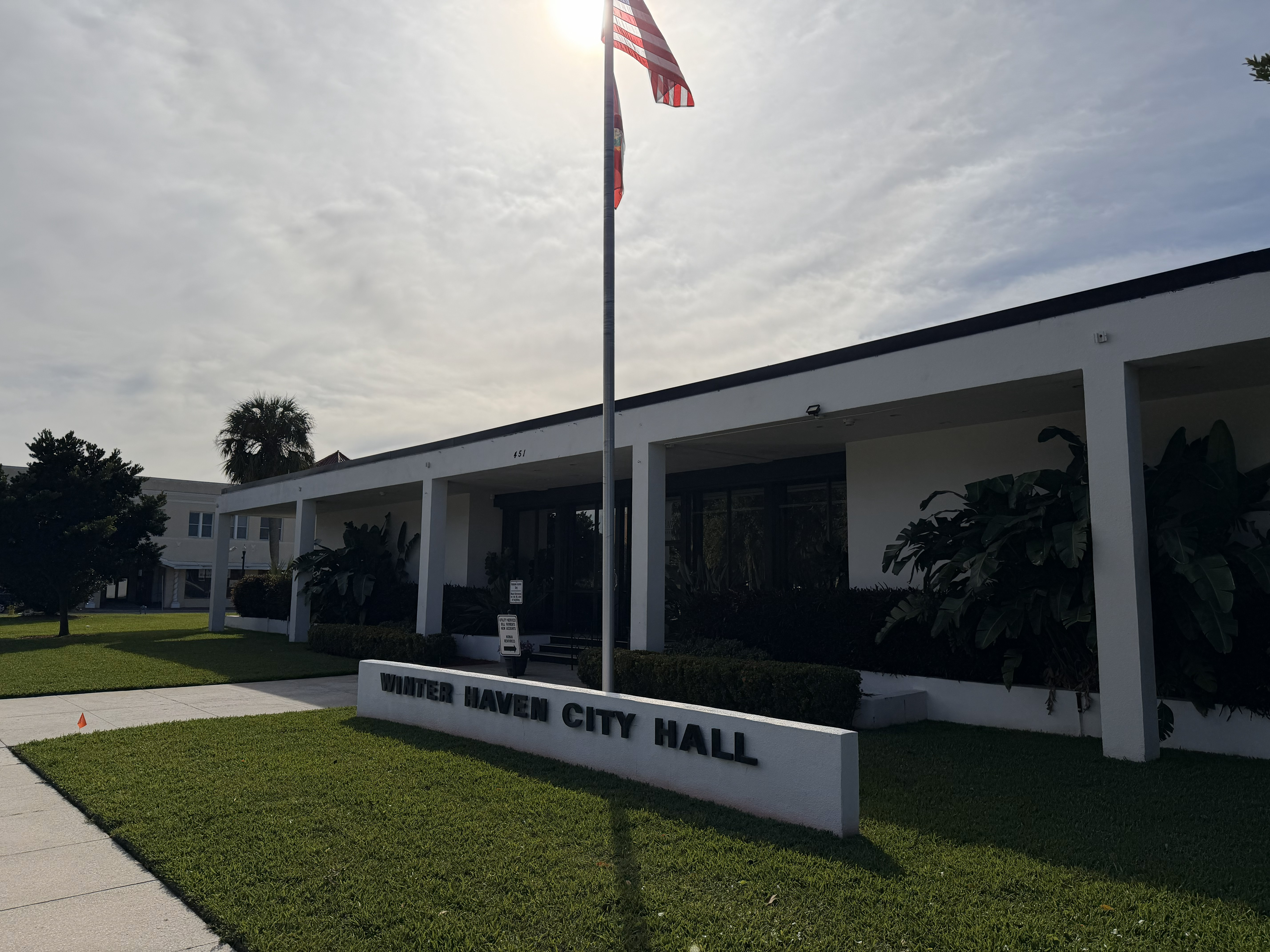
- Winter Haven City Hall

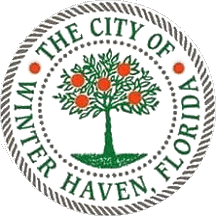
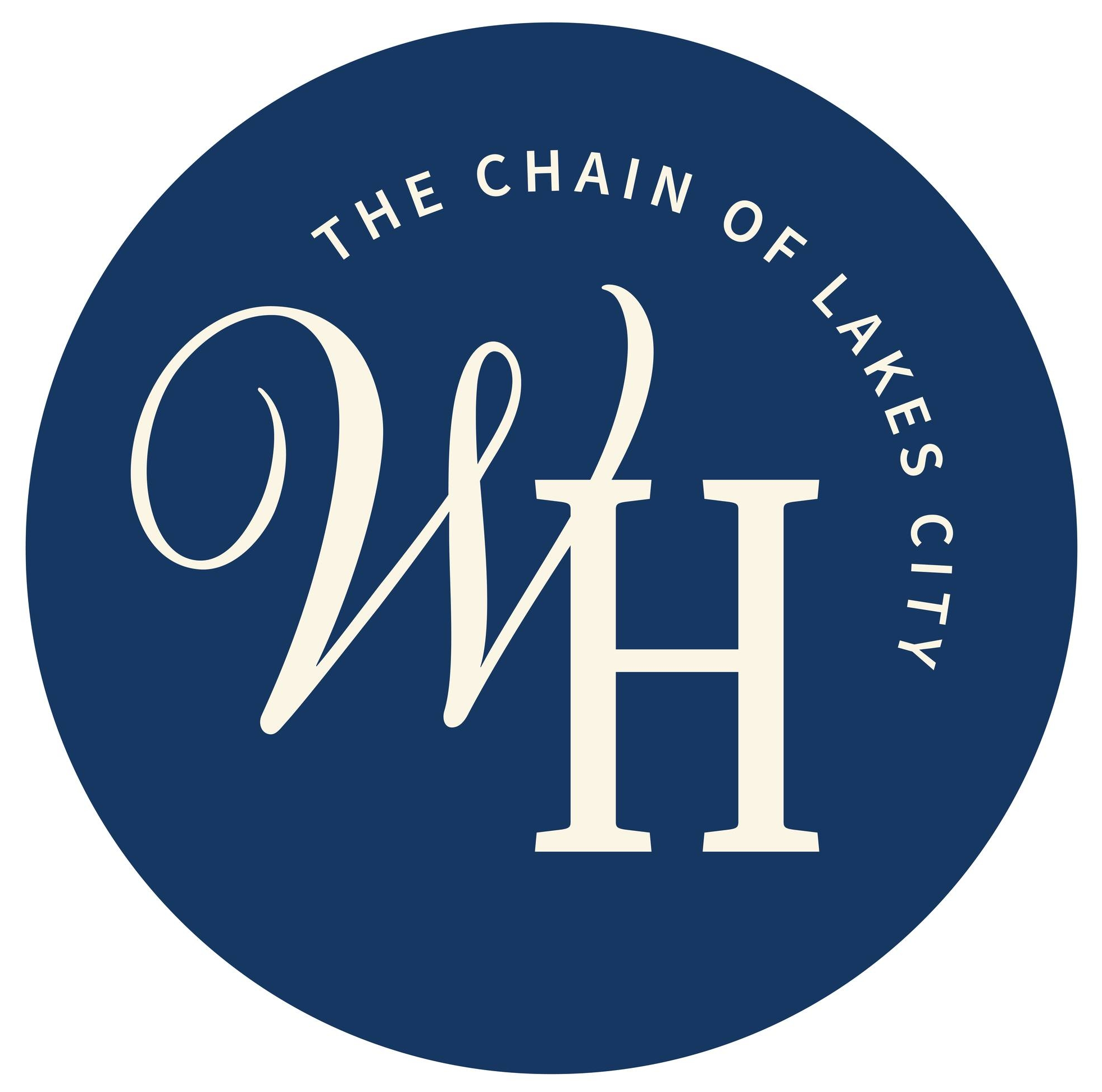
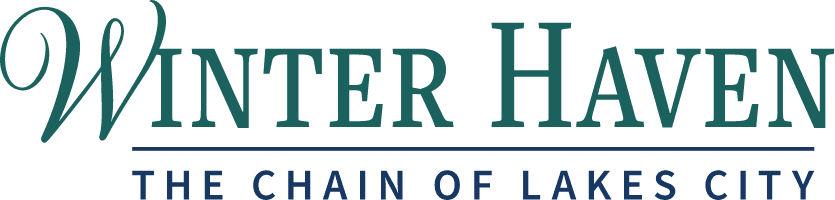
- Seal Coat of arms Wordmark
- Nickname: "The Chain of Lakes City"
- Location in Polk County and the state of Florida
- Coordinates: 28°01′23″N 81°44′04″W
- Country: United States
- State: Florida
- County: Polk
- Platted (Harris Corners): 1884-1885
- Incorporated (town): June 22, 1911
- Incorporated (city): November 27, 1923

Government
  - Type: Commission–Manager

Area
  - City: 41.52 sq mi (107.53 km^{2})
  - Land: 32.84 sq mi (85.05 km^{2})
  - Water: 8.68 sq mi (22.47 km^{2})
- Elevation: 161 ft (49 m)

Population (2020)
  - City: 49,219
  - Estimate (2025): 62,313
  - Density: 1,498.8/sq mi (578.68/km^{2})
  - Urban: 253,251 (US: 161st)
  - Urban density: 1,774.5/sq mi (685.1/km^{2})
  - Metro: 725,046 (US: 80th)
- Time zone: UTC-5 (Eastern (EST))
  - Summer (DST): UTC-4 (EDT)
- Area code: 863
- FIPS code: 12-78275
- GNIS feature ID: 2405773
- Website: www.mywinterhaven.com

Winter Haven is a city in Polk County, Florida, United States. It is located about 51 miles (82 km) east of Tampa and about 47 miles (76 km) southwest of Orlando, with neighboring Lakeland located to its west. The city's population was 49,219 at the 2020 census, making it the second most populous city in Polk County after Lakeland. It is a principal city of the Lakeland-Winter Haven, Florida Metropolitan Statistical Area.

== History ==
=== Pre-history ===
The Timucua and the Calusa were the earliest known inhabitants of the Winter Haven area. Both of these groups were deeply affected by war and disease from the Spanish conquest of Florida in the early 1500s. The Timucua were particularly affected by the expedition of Hernando de Soto. By the 19th century, both these groups no longer existed. During these expeditions the Spanish explorers claimed the entire peninsula of Florida for the Spanish monarchy.

In the 19th century the Creek and the Seminole were known to live and hunt in this area. During the Seminole Wars the Seminole leader, Chipco, and his followers were known to live in the Winter Haven area. Several small skirmishes during the war were fought in and around Winter Haven.

=== 19th century ===
In 1819, after the signing of the Adams-Onís Treaty, the United States gained control of Florida. The first American or European settlers in the area were encouraged to settle there by the Armed Occupation Act of 1842.

During the 1840s and 1850s, the United States government conducted the first surveys of the area. Henry Washington conducted the first survey of the area in 1843. In 1849, Dr. John Westcott completed an extensive survey of the area, including mapping many of the local lakes. The first maps of the area were published by the United States government in 1854. In 1883, Henry Haines working for Henry Plant and the Plant System, successfully built the first railroad across Polk County, passing just north of Winter Haven. Lake Haines, in Winter Haven, was named after Haines, who served as a colonel in the Confederate States Army.

The arrival of the railroad created the first real growth in area. The area was platted from 1884 to 1885, and would first be known as Harris Corners. This name was in reference to F.A.K. Harris, who opened the first mercantile store in the area around this time. The name Winter Haven was later suggested, in reference to the area's pleasant climate.

=== Early 20th century ===
By the end of the century, the population grew to approximately 400 and on June 22, 1911, the City of Winter Haven was officially incorporated as a town. The Chain of Lakes canals were begun in 1915. The first Florida boom took place in the 1920s as towns sprang up all over the peninsula. Florida's potential as a place to live and a place to visit was first realized in the 1920s, but the Great Depression slowed growth until after World War II. On November 27, 1923, Winter Haven was officially reincorporated from a town to a city. Winter Haven Hospital was founded in 1926 and has been in the city ever since.

During this period, the population of Winter Haven began to grow substantially. Many beautiful single-family homes were built in Winter Haven at this time in the colonial revival style. Over 50 these homes are on the National Register of Historic Places today. They are noted for their architectural style and grace. Most of these historic homes are located in the Interlaken neighborhood. There are four historic districts in Winter Haven. They are Interlaken, Pope Avenue, Winter Haven Heights, and the downtown area.

=== Growth and development ===
In 1930, George W. Jenkins opened the first Publix supermarket in Winter Haven. His second store and the first stand-alone Publix store, was a 27 ft by 65 ft building at 199 West Central Avenue, opened in 1935, which exists today as the Regenerations thrift store. During the 1930s and 1940s, citrus magnate John A. Snively operated one of the largest fruit-packing plants in the world in Winter Haven.

Another defining event in Winter Haven was the opening of Cypress Gardens in 1936 by Dick Pope, Sr. and his wife, Julie Pope. They first got the idea for the park from a Good Housekeeping magazine that they were reading. By the 1950s, Cypress Gardens was nationally famous. It featured a beautiful botanical garden, water skiing shows, and a staff of southern belles. Many famous celebrities of that time visited the park, including Elvis Presley, Frank Sinatra, Betty Grable, and King Hussein of Jordan. In the 1980s, the Anheuser-Busch corporation purchased the park. They continued to operate the park until 1995. After that, the park struggled, finally closing for good in 2009. On January 21, 2010, the site of Cypress Gardens was formally announced as the selected location for the Legoland Florida theme park, which opened on October 15, 2011. Legoland Florida has successfully retained some of the tradition and history of the original site, including part of the original botanical garden and a water ski show.

Winter Haven features many buildings designed by the architect Gene Leedy, one of the founders of the Sarasota School of Architecture. Regency Medical Center, which is Winter Haven Hospital's women's hospital, was built in 1987. Some of Leedy's structures are part of the Downtown Winter Haven Historic District.

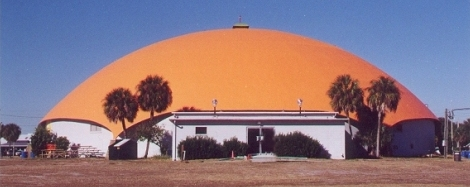
Old, undated photograph of the Winter Haven Orange Dome.

The Orange Dome, located near the corner of Cypress Gardens Blvd and US Hwy 17, was built in 1964. For 48 years, it hosted the annual Citrus Festival and other civic affairs. In February 2012, the Orange Dome was demolished to make way for The Landings, a proposed $150 million mixed-use development that was intended to include high-end retail stores, restaurants, hotels, apartments and a new movie theater to be built at the Chain of Lakes Complex. However, after the construction of three fast-food restaurants, the project collapsed. As of April 2013, the developer and the city were in negotiations to determine the future of the site.

=== Pughsville ===
Pughsville was a neighborhood of Winter Haven where African-Americans built a community after the Civil War. A historical marker on Highway 17 at Avenue O commemorates the community. According to the marker, Pughsville was one of Winter Haven's earliest neighborhoods and was settled by African-Americans who cleared the land in the southwest section of the city.

Pughsville was named for an early black pioneer, Reverend Charles Pugh, who was a founder of Zion Hill Missionary Baptist Church. Pughsville was also home to Bethel A.M.E., St. Paul Holiness, and Church of Christ. The community was most active from the 1900s until the 1950s and had a school, social halls, small grocery stores, and restaurants where some residents worked. Others worked in the citrus industry or in state or federal jobs. Pughsville produced Winter Haven's first African-American commissioner and mayor Lemuel Geathers, medical doctor, fire fighter and postal worker. The community declined in the late 1970s as larger commercial establishments began arriving in the area.

== Geography ==
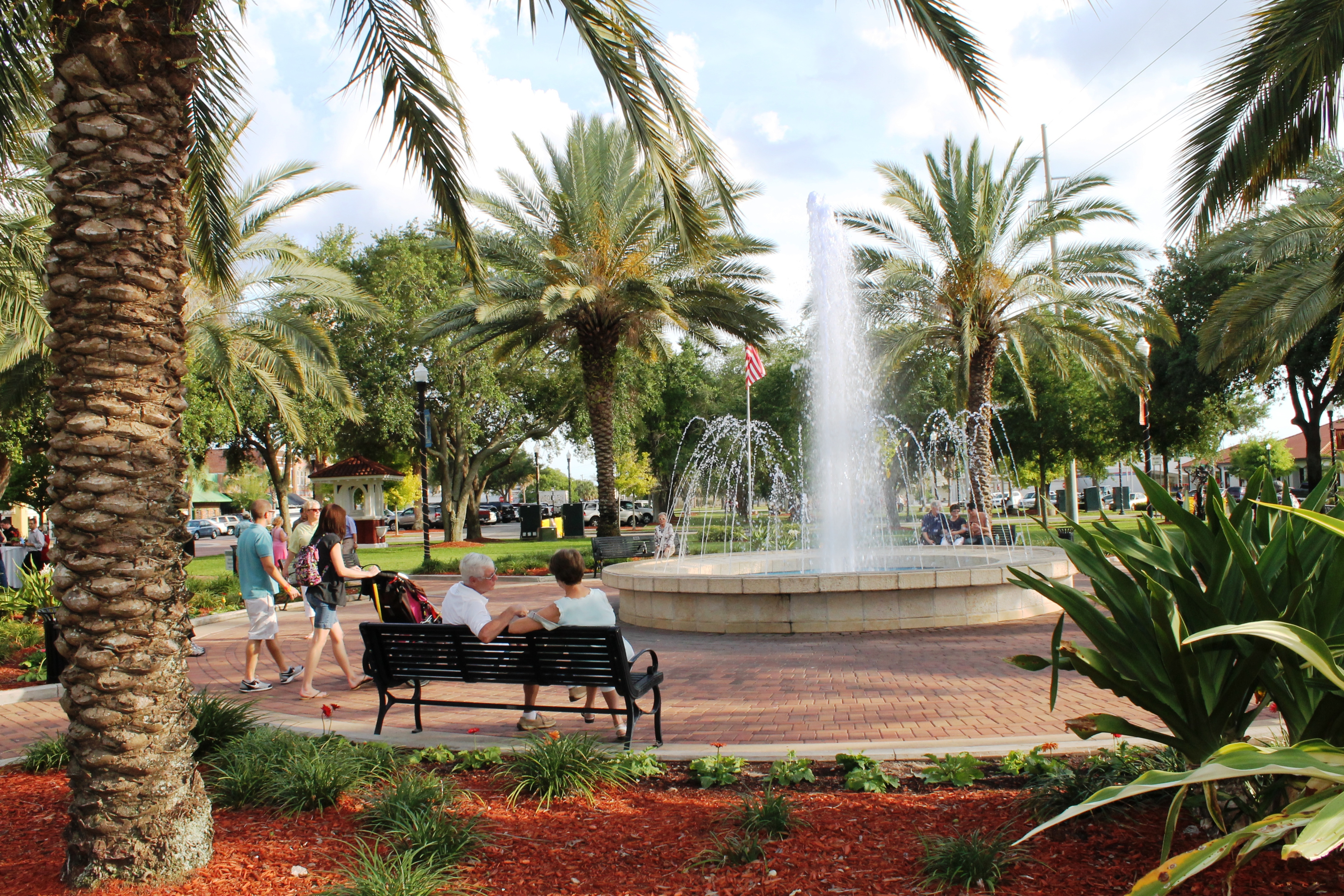
Fountain Walk in Downtown Winter Haven, Florida

According to the United States Census Bureau, the city has a total area of 25.4 square miles (66 km^{2}), of which 17.7 square miles (46 km^{2}) is land and 7.7 square miles (20 km^{2}) (30.45%) is water. Winter Haven is located within the Central Florida Highlands area of the Atlantic coastal plain with a terrain consisting of flatland interspersed with gently rolling hills. It has an average elevation of 146 feet (45 m) above sea-level. The city is located at the headwaters of the Peace River.

=== Lakes ===
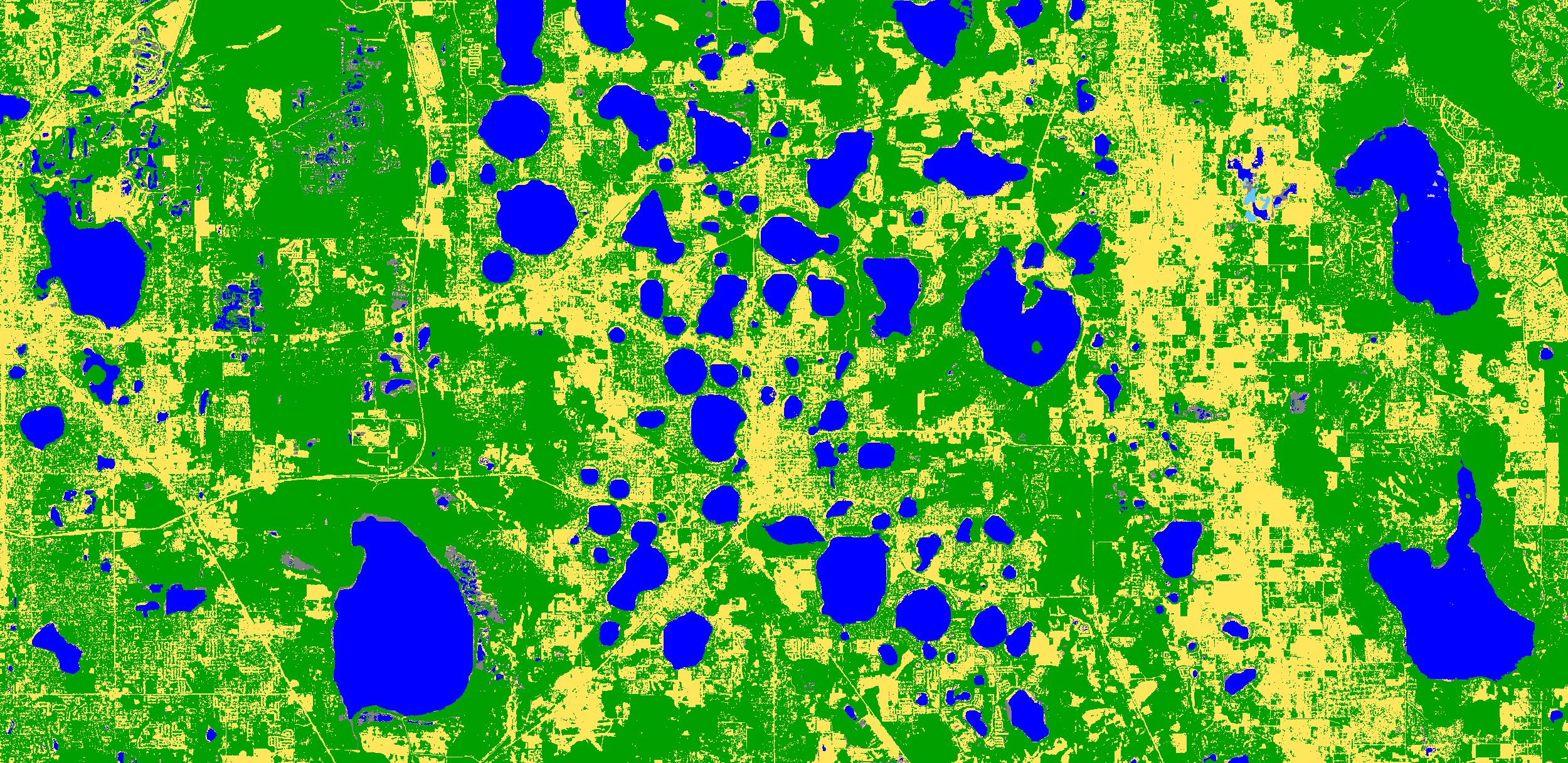
Color-altered satellite image showing water in blue around Winter Haven

Winter Haven has fifty lakes within its borders, including its famous Chain of Lakes. The lakes are by far the city's most distinctive feature. Winter Haven bills itself as "The Chain of Lakes City". The city has two prominent chains of lakes. The northern chain has nine lakes interconnected by a series of canals. The southern chain features sixteen lakes interconnected by a series of canals. The southern chain has several prominent lakes, including Lake Eloise, Lake Howard, and Lake Lulu. In 2011, after six years of construction and political infighting, Winter Haven opened a canal lock system connecting the two chains. Most of the lakes in Winter Haven formed in a similar fashion to sinkholes, through dissolving of the limestone ground. These types of lakes are called "solution lakes". The lakes in Winter Haven teem with life, including alligators, bald eagles, great blue herons, and more. The Winter Haven lakes are a world-renowned spot for bass fishing.

=== Climate ===
Winter Haven is located in the humid subtropical zone (Köppen climate classification: Cfa). The average temperature is 74.6 °F (24 °C). The city averages 46.12 inches (1,171 mm) of rain per year. The months of June, July, August, and September, which includes the height of the Atlantic hurricane season, are by far the rainiest time of the year. Those four months, which average 26.63 inches (67.6 cm) of rain, account for more than half of the annual rainfall. Winters in Winter Haven are dry and sunny, with high temperatures of 72–76 °F (22–24 °C) and lows of 51–55 °F (11–13 °C). Frost occurs about once per year on average.

Climate data for Winter Haven, Florida (Winter Haven's Gilbert Airport), 1991–2020 normals, extremes 1941–present
Month	Jan	Feb	Mar	Apr	May	Jun	Jul	Aug	Sep	Oct	Nov	Dec	Year
Record high °F (°C)	89 (32)	91 (33)	94 (34)	98 (37)	103 (39)	103 (39)	101 (38)	100 (38)	98 (37)	96 (36)	99 (37)	95 (35)	103 (39)
Mean maximum °F (°C)	83.0 (28.3)	84.9 (29.4)	87.8 (31.0)	91.0 (32.8)	95.1 (35.1)	96.3 (35.7)	96.7 (35.9)	96.2 (35.7)	94.5 (34.7)	91.4 (33.0)	87.4 (30.8)	83.9 (28.8)	97.7 (36.5)
Mean daily maximum °F (°C)	72.5 (22.5)	75.6 (24.2)	79.7 (26.5)	84.6 (29.2)	89.7 (32.1)	92.2 (33.4)	92.9 (33.8)	92.7 (33.7)	90.8 (32.7)	86.1 (30.1)	79.5 (26.4)	74.4 (23.6)	84.2 (29.0)
Daily mean °F (°C)	62.2 (16.8)	65.1 (18.4)	69.1 (20.6)	73.8 (23.2)	79.3 (26.3)	83.0 (28.3)	84.1 (28.9)	84.1 (28.9)	82.5 (28.1)	77.1 (25.1)	69.8 (21.0)	64.6 (18.1)	74.6 (23.7)
Mean daily minimum °F (°C)	51.9 (11.1)	54.6 (12.6)	58.5 (14.7)	63.1 (17.3)	69.0 (20.6)	73.8 (23.2)	75.4 (24.1)	75.6 (24.2)	74.1 (23.4)	68.0 (20.0)	60.0 (15.6)	54.8 (12.7)	64.9 (18.3)
Mean minimum °F (°C)	34.0 (1.1)	37.7 (3.2)	42.5 (5.8)	51.6 (10.9)	60.2 (15.7)	68.7 (20.4)	70.8 (21.6)	71.8 (22.1)	68.5 (20.3)	55.2 (12.9)	44.8 (7.1)	39.1 (3.9)	32.0 (0.0)
Record low °F (°C)	19 (−7)	23 (−5)	23 (−5)	32 (0)	46 (8)	50 (10)	59 (15)	62 (17)	59 (15)	41 (5)	26 (−3)	19 (−7)	19 (−7)
Average precipitation inches (mm)	2.49 (63)	2.44 (62)	3.04 (77)	2.50 (64)	2.67 (68)	7.36 (187)	7.44 (189)	6.52 (166)	5.31 (135)	2.22 (56)	1.45 (37)	2.68 (68)	46.12 (1,171)
Average precipitation days (≥ 0.01 in)	8.7	7.5	7.5	6.0	8.4	16.2	17.6	18.7	14.3	7.8	7.0	8.3	128.0
Source: NOAA all-time Feb low

== Demographics ==
Historical population
Census	Pop.	Note	%±
1920	1,597		—
1930	7,130		346.5%
1940	6,199		−13.1%
1950	8,605		38.8%
1960	16,277		89.2%
1970	16,136		−0.9%
1980	21,119		30.9%
1990	24,725		17.1%
2000	26,487		7.1%
2010	33,874		27.9%
2020	49,219		45.3%
2025 (est.)	62,313		26.6%
U.S. Decennial Census

=== Racial and ethnic composition ===
Winter Haven racial composition (Hispanics excluded from racial categories) (NH = Non-Hispanic)
Race	Pop 2010	Pop 2020	% 2010	% 2020
White (NH)	19,674	22,443	58.08%	45.60%
Black or African American (NH)	9,149	12,097	27.01%	24.58%
Native American or Alaska Native (NH)	65	112	0.19%	0.23%
Asian (NH)	667	1,218	1.97%	2.47%
Pacific Islander or Native Hawaiian (NH)	28	12	0.08%	0.02%
Some other race (NH)	61	292	0.18%	0.59%
Two or more races/Multiracial (NH)	493	1,515	1.46%	3.08%
Hispanic or Latino (any race)	3,737	11,530	11.03%	23.43%
Total	33,874	49,219	100.00%	100.00%

=== 2020 census ===
As of the 2020 census, Winter Haven had a population of 49,219. The median age was 41.8 years. 22.0% of residents were under the age of 18 and 22.7% of residents were 65 years of age or older. For every 100 females there were 86.9 males, and for every 100 females age 18 and over there were 83.9 males age 18 and over.

98.2% of residents lived in urban areas, while 1.8% lived in rural areas.

There were 19,528 households in Winter Haven, of which 29.2% had children under the age of 18 living in them. Of all households, 43.6% were married-couple households, 17.0% were households with a male householder and no spouse or partner present, and 32.1% were households with a female householder and no spouse or partner present. About 28.6% of all households were made up of individuals and 15.1% had someone living alone who was 65 years of age or older. According to the 2020 American Community Survey, there were 10,260 families residing in the city.

There were 21,902 housing units, of which 10.8% were vacant. The homeowner vacancy rate was 2.6% and the rental vacancy rate was 9.6%.

Racial composition as of the 2020 census
Race	Number	Percent
White	25,501	51.8%
Black or African American	12,471	25.3%
American Indian and Alaska Native	217	0.4%
Asian	1,238	2.5%
Native Hawaiian and Other Pacific Islander	18	0.0%
Some other race	4,268	8.7%
Two or more races	5,506	11.2%
Hispanic or Latino (of any race)	11,530	23.4%

=== 2010 census ===
As of the 2010 United States census, there were 33,874 people, 14,025 households, and 8,762 families residing in the city.

=== 2000 census ===
As of 2000, there were 11,833 households, out of which 21.6% had children under the age of 18 living with them, 42.1% were married couples living together, 12.8% had a female householder with no husband present, and 41.4% were non-families. 36.0% of all households were made up of individuals, and 18.9% had someone living alone who was 65 years of age or older. The average household size was 2.17 and the average family size was 2.81.

In 2000, in the city the population was spread out, with 20.9% under the age of 18, 6.8% from 18 to 24, 23.5% from 25 to 44, 21.4% from 45 to 64, and 27.4% who were 65 years of age or older. The median age was 44 years. For every 100 females, there were 85.1 males. For every 100 females age 18 and over, there were 81.2 males.

In 2000, the median income for a household in the city was $31,884, and the median income for a family was $39,657. Males had a median income of $30,943 versus $21,812 for females. The per capita income for the city was $20,383. About 10.5% of families and 15.0% of the population were below the poverty line, including 24.2% of those under age 18 and 7.9% of those age 65 or over.

== Sports ==
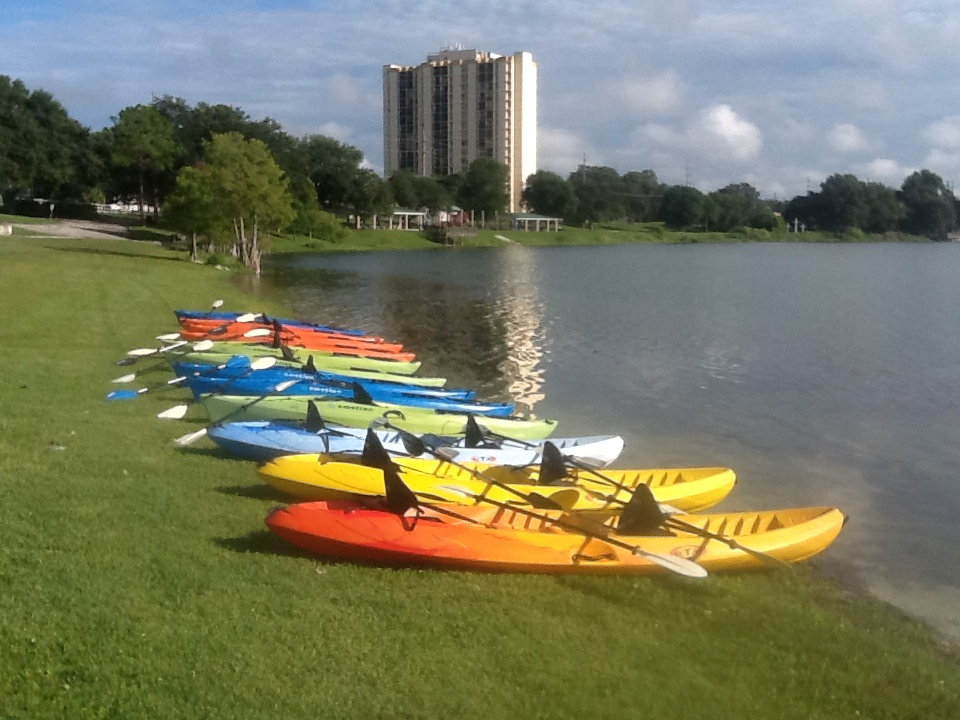
Kayaks at Lake Silver

Three-time Olympic gold medal swimmer, Rowdy Gaines, and Olympic gold medal sprinter, Kenneth Brokenburr both grew up in Winter Haven. Four-time NBA all-star and Olympic gold medalist guard Otis Birdsong also grew up in Winter Haven. Welterweight boxing champion Andre Berto is another famous athlete who grew up in Winter Haven.

Winter Haven has many successful sports programs, both recreational and competitive, serving the youth in the community. Winter Haven High School has won several state and district championships in various sports, including Girls Varsity Basketball State Championship in 2005, 2007, 2016, and 2017.

With so many lakes, Winter Haven is a location for fresh water fishing. The two sports for which Winter Haven is best known are water skiing and baseball.

=== Water skiing history ===
Winter Haven has played a major role in the development and growth of water skiing as a sport. Dick Pope Sr. used water skiing as a way to promote his Cypress Gardens theme park starting in the 1930s, and water ski shows soon became a staple of entertainment at the park. He was also the first person to complete a jump on water skis, jumping over a wooden ramp in 1928, for a distance of 25 feet (7.6 m). He pioneered a number of other water skiing tricks, including the water ski human pyramid, as part of an effort to develop his shows at Cypress Gardens. His son, Dick Pope Jr., popularized barefoot water skiing, bringing early pioneers such as Don Thomson to Cypress gardens to develop novel acts such as tumble turns, backwards barefooting, front-to-back and beach starts to please the theme park crowds.

Winter Haven is connected to ten members of the Water Ski Hall of Fame, more than any other city in the world. These include Dick Pope Sr., Dick Pope Jr., and Ricky McCormick. George A. "Banana George" Blair, who still holds several water ski world records, was first introduced to the sport while visiting Winter Haven in the 1950s. Winter Haven has many lakes, including its famous chain of lakes, that are used for water skiing.

=== Spring training baseball ===
Winter Haven was a Major League Baseball Spring Training site for many years, first at Denison Field and later at Chain of Lakes Park. Great baseball players who played spring training baseball in Winter Haven included Jimmie Foxx, Lou Gehrig, Willie Mays, Roberto Clemente, Johnny Bench, and Hank Aaron.

In 1928, the Philadelphia Phillies were the first Major League Baseball team to call Winter Haven their spring-home. The Phillies played at Denison Field, which featured a large, covered wooden grandstand. The Phillies played spring training games there until 1938. In 1940, the New York Giants did one season there. After baseball left Denison, the field was donated to the city for the benefit of youth athletics. The stadium was rebuilt in 1947 with a larger grandstand and in use today for college and high school football, soccer, track and field, and other events.

In 1966, the Boston Red Sox and spring training baseball returned to Winter Haven. The Red Sox played in the newly built Chain of Lakes Park, a state-of-the-art facility at that time. For twenty-six years, the Red Sox called Winter Haven their spring-home. When the Red Sox left for Fort Myers, Florida in 1992, the city of Winter Haven sought a new Major League Baseball team. Later that year, Hurricane Andrew devastated Homestead, Florida, including the spring training facilities of the Cleveland Indians, and the Indians moved to Winter Haven. In 2008, after failed negotiations with the city to renovate Chain of Lakes Park, the Indians moved into a brand-new stadium in Goodyear, Arizona after sixteen spring seasons at Chain of Lakes Park.

In December 2020, Winter Haven and Polk County agreed to demolish the stadium and replace it with baseball diamonds and general-purpose athletic fields.

== Education ==
=== Public and private schools ===
Public schools in Winter Haven are operated by Polk County Public Schools.

- All Saints' Academy
- Chain of Lakes Collegiate High School
- Chain of Lakes Elementary School
- Cypress Junction Montessori School
- Denison Middle School
- Eagle Lake Elementary School
- Elbert Elementary School
- Frank E. Brigham Academy Elementary School
- Garden Grove Elementary School
- Garner Elementary School
- Grace Lutheran School
- Inwood Elementary School
- Jewett Academy Middle School
- Jewett School of the Arts (K–8)
- John A. Snively Elementary School
- Lake Region High School
- Lake Shipp Elementary School
- Mark Wilcox Center
- Oasis Christian Academy
- Rachel's School for the Custodial Arts
- St. Joseph Catholic School
- St. Paul's Episcopal School
- Wahneta Elementary School
- Westwood Middle School
- Winter Haven Christian School
- Winter Haven High School

=== Colleges and universities ===
- Polk State College (PSC)
- Ridge Career Center

== Notable people ==
- Andre Berto, professional welterweight boxer
- Otis Birdsong, professional basketball player
- Kenny Brokenburr, Olympic gold medalist, sprinter
- Marcus Capers, professional basketball player
- Valerie Carter, singer
- Rowdy Gaines, Olympic swimmer
- Chase Johnsey, ballet dancer, Artistic Director of Ballet de Barcelona
- George Kalogridis, President of Walt Disney World Resort
- Gene Leedy, architect
- Lobo, musician
- Trey Mancini, baseball player and cancer survivor
- Jake Owen, musician, singer and songwriter
- Kathleen Parker, author and syndicated columnist
- Larry Parrish, professional baseball player
- Gram Parsons, musician
- Dick Pope Sr., founder of Cypress Gardens
- Dick Pope Jr., CEO of Cypress Gardens
- John A. Snively, citrus magnate
- Jim Stafford, entertainer
- Max Strang, architect
- Don Thomson, water skier and navy pilot
- Constance Weldon, tuba player and academic
- Sally Wheeler, actress
- Ryan Yarbrough, Tampa Bay Rays baseball pitcher
- Maryly Van Leer, President of Polk Community College, women's rights activist

== Media ==
Winter Haven is part of the Tampa/St. Pete television market, the 13th largest in the country and part of the local Lakeland/Winter Haven radio market, which is the 94th largest in the country.

Since 1911, the Winter Haven News Chief has served the community as the local newspaper. The News Chief also published the Polk County Shopper and ran the site polkonline.com. In 2008, News Chief was taken over by the Lakeland Ledger and operations were merged into that paper's Winter Haven branch.

== Transportation ==
=== Highways ===
Major routes through, to, and from Winter Haven include:

- US 17 – A major north/south route through Winter Haven, this highway leads northward to Lake Alfred where it joins US 92, and southward to Bartow.
- US 27 – This divided highway east of Winter Haven will be a key access road for Legoland Florida in its intersection with Interstate 4 to the north.
- SR 540 – This key road runs through southern Winter Haven as Cypress Gardens Boulevard, leading westward to Lakeland and the Polk Parkway, by Legoland Florida just east of town, and on eastward to US 27.
- SR 542 – It cuts through the heart of Winter Haven's downtown as Central Avenue, and leads eastward directly to Dundee at US 27.
- SR 544 – From northern Winter Haven, SR 544 connects westward to Auburndale, hence its name, Havendale Boulevard, and leads a scenic route eastward toward Haines City.

The streets of downtown Winter Haven are arranged in a grid plan. 1st Street (SR 549) is the north–south axis, with two sets of numbered streets running parallel – one to the east (e.g. 7th St. NE/SE), and one to the west (e.g. 6th St. NW/SW). Central Avenue (SR 542) is the west–east axis, with two sets of lettered avenues similarly running parallel on either side.

=== Public transit ===
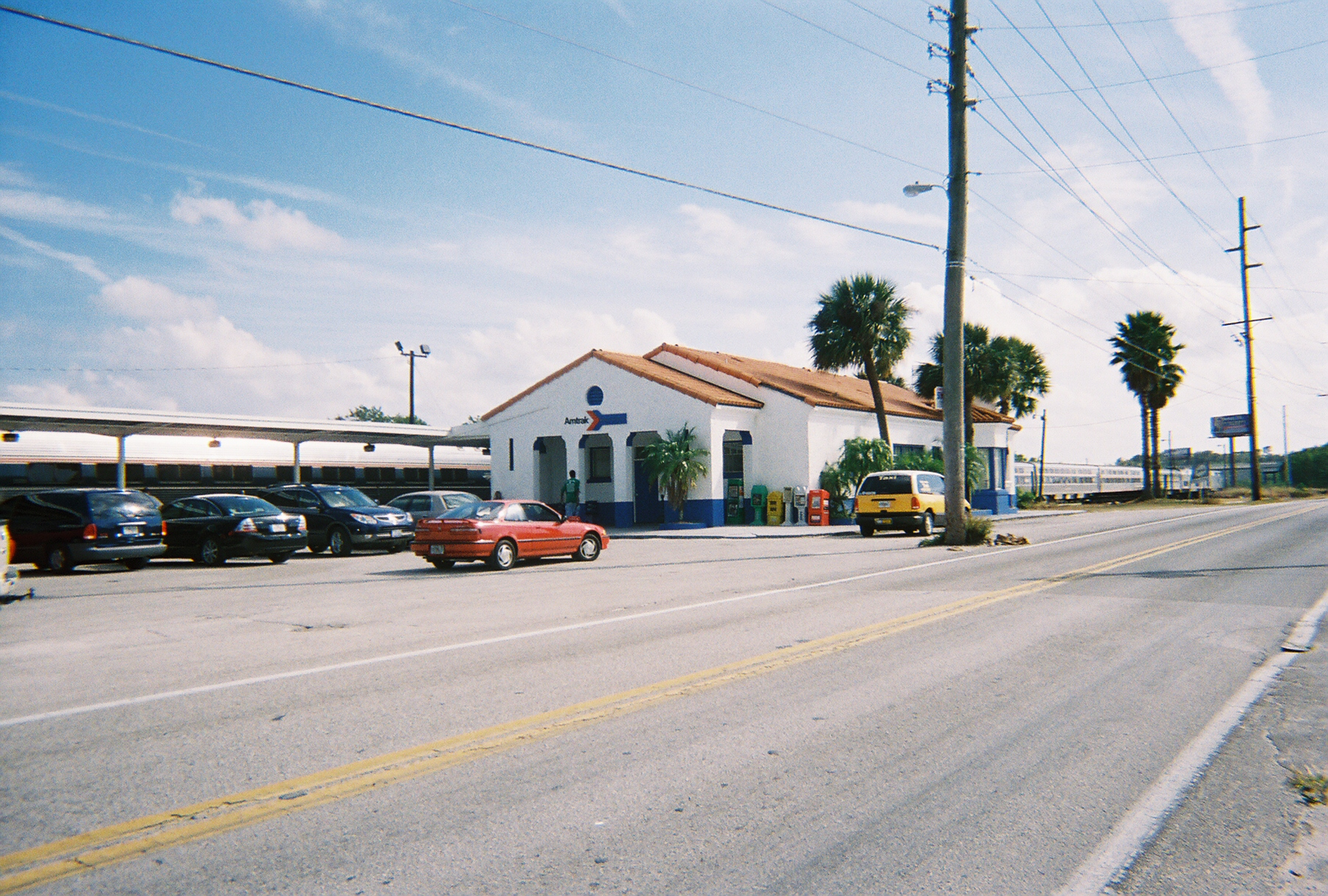
Winter Haven Amtrak Station

Local commuter bus service is provided by Winter Haven Area Transit and the Citrus Connection.

=== Air transport ===
Winter Haven's Gilbert Airport (KGIF) and the adjacent Jack Browns Seaplane Base (F57) are located 3 miles (4.8 km) northwest of the central business district.

=== Intercity rail ===
Winter Haven has an Amtrak train station served by the Floridian and Silver Meteor.

== Places of interest ==
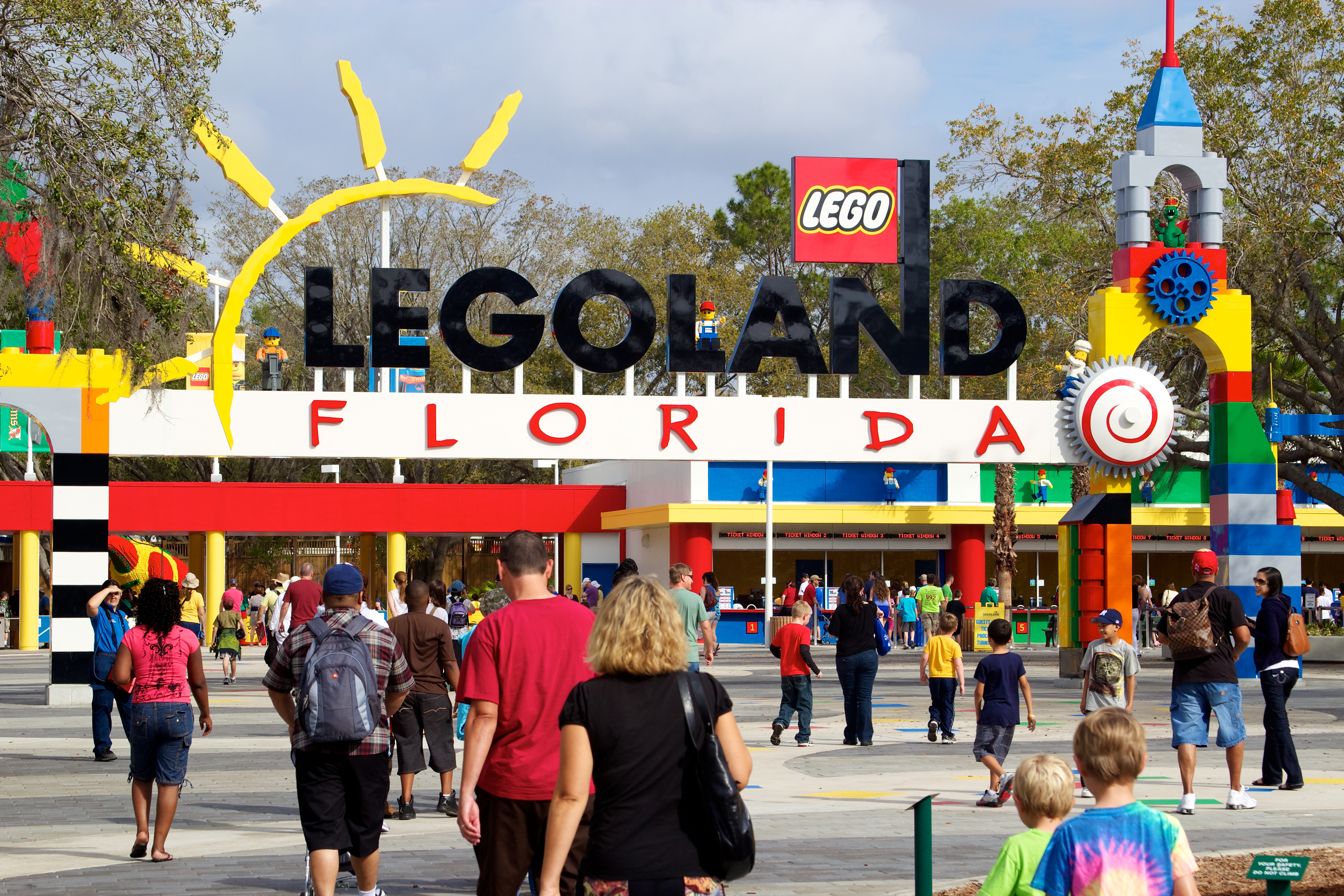
Entrance to Legoland Florida

=== Attractions ===
- Chain of Lakes
- Legoland Florida

=== Healthcare ===
- Winter Haven Hospital
- Winter Haven Women's Hospital
- Bond Clinic
- Gessler Clinic

== Sister city ==
- Sambuca di Sicilia, Italy (1984), on the occasion of the Water Ski World Cup performed on the lago Arancio, in Sambuca di Sicilia, Italy. The two cities share an association with water skiing.

== See also ==
- List of people from Winter Haven, Florida
- Lake Daisy (Florida)
- Camp Mack's River Resort
- River Ranch, Florida
- Winter Park, Florida
