= Rick Dantzler =

American politician (born 1956)

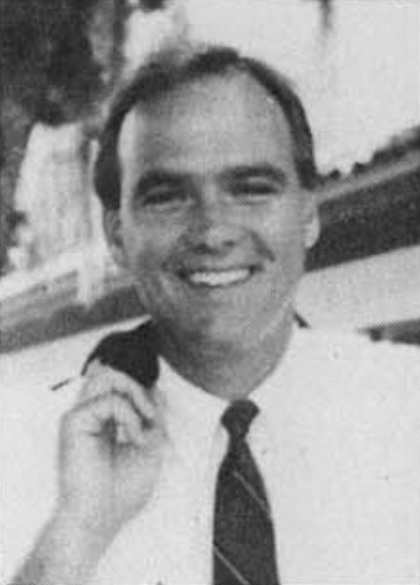
- Dantzler in 1992

Florida State Executive Director of the Farm Service Agency
- In office January 13, 2014 – January 20, 2017
- President: Barack Obama
- Preceded by: Debby Folsom

Member of the Florida Senate from the 13th & 17th district
- In office 1990 – January 6, 1998
- Preceded by: Bob Crawford

Member of the Florida House of Representatives from the 43rd district
- In office 1982–1990
- Preceded by: Bob Crawford

Personal details
- Born: January 1956 (age 70) Fort Leonard Wood, Missouri, United States
- Party: Democratic
- Spouse: Julie Pope (m. 1984)
- Children: 2
- Education: B.A. (1978) & JD (1981); University of Florida
- Occupation: Lawyer
- Salary: US$155,000 (2018) (eq. $198,731 in 2025)

Rick Dantzler (born January 1956) is an American lawyer, former Florida politician, and a member of the Democratic Party. From Winter Haven, Dantzler served in the Florida House of Representatives from 1982 to 1990, and in the Florida Senate from 1990 to 1998. He was Buddy MacKay's running mate in the 1998 Florida gubernatorial election; they lost to Jeb Bush and Frank Brogan. From 2014 to 2017, Dantzler was President Obama's appointed Florida State Executive Director of the Farm Service Agency.

Born into a family of politicians, Dantzler is a lawyer and writer. With his wife Julie (née Pope), Dantzler has two adult daughters. A member of the Florida Bar since 1983, Dantzler was specializing in agricultural law at the Victor Smith Law Group law firm by May 2018. That July, Dantzler was hired as chief operating officer of the Lake Alfred, Florida-based Citrus Research and Development Foundation.

== Personal life ==
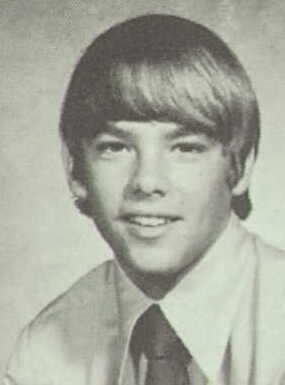
In his 1973 high-school yearbook, Wha Hwa Hta See

Born on Fort Leonard Wood on January 2 or 6, 1956, Dantzler was raised in Winter Haven, Florida as a third-generation Floridian. In 1973, he was a junior at Winter Haven High School. His father was mayor of Winter Haven while Dantzler was a child, an office to which his younger brother Brad was appointed in January 2016. Another brother—Todd Dantzler—has served as a Polk County, Florida commissioner.

Dantzler met Julie Pope in 1982 during his first run for the Florida House of Representatives. The daughter of water skier and Florida business leader Dick Pope Jr., Pope was described by the Sun-Sentinel as "a hometown girl, [and] the well-to-do granddaughter of the founder of Winter Haven's Cypress Gardens tourist attraction." Dantzler and Pope wed in 1984. They had two children: older daughter Elizabeth (born 1985/1986) and younger Margaret (born 1989/1990). According to his Florida House of Representatives biography, Dantzler is a Presbyterian.

Dantzler enjoys writing, having written articles for newspapers and magazines, as well as three historical fiction books. One of these, 2002's Under the Panther Moon, is a collection of short stories about Florida environmental issues. He joined the board of the Florida Sports Hall of Fame in 2006, and was the body's president as of September 2014. Dantzler stood at 6 feet 4 inches (1.93 m) in 1998, and in a June 1998 public disclosure of his health records, he revealed his diagnoses of Gilbert's syndrome and post-nasal drip, and that he was otherwise in good health.

== Education ==
At Winter Haven High School, Dantzler played quarterback on the school's American football team, and was the baseball team's "star shortstop".

Dantzler attended both the University of Puget Sound and the University of Florida. He received a Bachelor of Arts in political science from the latter in 1978, as well as his Juris Doctor in 1981. At the University of Florida, Dantzler was a member of Florida Blue Key and Alpha Tau Omega.

== Political career ==
=== Florida Legislature ===
==== House of Representatives ====
When Dantzler returned to Winter Haven in 1981, rumour was that the local state representative, Democrat Bob Crawford, was considering a run for the Florida Senate, but because he would not publicly commit, it was stopping other Democrats from running for his House seat. Dantzler instead approached Crawford in the representative's office, and plainly asked the man about his intentions. When Crawford admitted his senatorial plans, Dantzler ran for the 43rd District seat and beat Republican Bill Siegel in the 1982 election with 11364 votes (60.1% thereof). For his 1984 run to retain his seat from the 43rd District, Dantzler ran unopposed in both the Democratic primary and the general election. Dantzler was elected to the same seat four times, serving from 1982 to 1990.

==== Senate ====
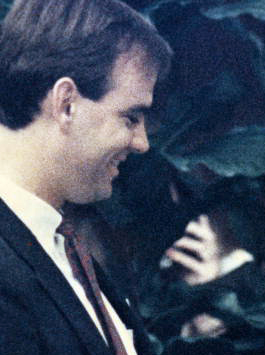
Dantzler in 1990

In 1990, Dantzler was elected to the Florida Senate seat from District 13, defeating Republican Ernie Caldwell with 51.1% of the vote. This vacancy was also Bob Crawford's doing, as the Democratic senator left his seat to run for Florida Commissioner of Agriculture. While in the Senate, Dantzler forged "landmark laws", and his proudest achievement was negotiating the Everglades Forever Act as chairman of the Senate Natural Resources Committee. Fellow Senate Democrat Howard Forman told the Sun-Sentinel in 1998 that Dantzler was known for his success at bringing together senatorial combatants. Eighty-nine percent of Dantzler's senate votes were found to have aligned with the interests of the conservative Christian Coalition of America. Dantzler served in the Senate until resigning from representing District 17 on January 6, 1998.

=== Run for governor ===
In 1998, Dantzler began his campaign for the Florida governorship. Dick Pope Jr., his father-in-law, held Dantzler's official campaign announcement at Cypress Gardens, the botanical garden and amusement park founded by Dick Pope Sr. in 1936.

Dantzler was a gubernatorial candidate in the Democratic Party's 1998 primary. When Dantzler resigned from the senate, he said it was to preempt campaign finance improprieties that could arise due to his influence in the March 3, 1998 legislative session. Fellow Democrat contender, Representative J. Keith Arnold, called this a smokescreen gesture that would allow Dantzler more time than his opponents to fundraise; while political historian Edmund Kallina said the move was probably equally calculated to grab headlines, it actually indicated Dantzler's fundraising weakness in the face of Florida Lieutenant Governor Buddy MacKay's superior capabilities. By May 30, 1998, Dantzler's polling numbers for the September primary were trailing behind those of Lieutenant Governor MacKay, the latter of whom had raised approximately US$2.2 million (equivalent to about $4M in 2025).

According to Florida Democratic Party insiders, it was late June when Dantzler—behind in polls and suffering fundraising difficulties—approached Lieutenant Governor MacKay about joining forces for the Democratic primary. Governor Lawton Chiles brokered the deal, and on June 30 in a downtown Tallahassee park, the two men announced a new joint ticket. Supporters of the new joint venture expected Dantzler would provide the aggressiveness, youth, and vitality that MacKay's campaign lacked in facing Jeb Bush. Meanwhile, Arnold said he would stay in the primary race, calling the MacKay–Dantzler ticket a political marriage that would not help either man's chances in the election.

Despite the political endorsement of the Sun-Sentinel, MacKay and Dantzler ultimately lost the November 3, 1998 election to Jeb Bush and Frank Brogan.

=== Farm Service Agency ===
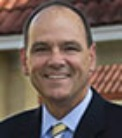
Dantzler's FSA photo (c. 2014)

In 2013, then-president of the United States Barack Obama asked Dantzler to serve as the Florida State Executive Director of the Farm Service Agency (FSA). When initially approached, Dantzler later admitted ignorance of the position, but became more interested the more he learned. The agency's responsibilities included the United States Department of Agriculture's programs concerned with Florida's environment, minority farmer outreach, and agriculture emergency response; these issues' importance to Florida are what Dantzler said compelled him to accept the appointment and take over the office from the outgoing Debby Folsom.

The 57-year-old lawyer accepted the president's appointment in 2013, and served from January 13, 2014 through President Obama's last three years in office. As the executive director's office was located in Gainesville, Florida, Dantzler's family stayed in Polk County, Florida while the new appointee moved to McIntosh, Florida: a town approximately 20 miles (32 km) from Gainesville. In his new position, Dantzler looked forward to working with the Florida Department of Agriculture and Consumer Services to combat citrus greening disease and to resolve labor issues.

Soon after his appointment, Dantzler worked with US Congressional Representative Ted Yoho to soften or delay the effects the Agricultural Act of 2014 would have on Floridian peanut farmers who could not secure crop insurance due to the federal Farm Security and Rural Investment Act of 2002.

=== Further political activity ===
After his run for the lieutenant-governorship, Dantzler made an aborted run for Florida Commissioner of Agriculture. The Ledger said in 2013 that he dropped from the race partly because of the pay-to-play requirements of urban county political parties.

In 2013, Dantzler spoke with The Ledger saying of politics, "I think about it every day. I miss it a lot." Dissatisfied with the products of Tallahassee, Florida and Washington, D.C. politics, the former state senator had crafted an agenda in case he returned to politics. Dantzler invoked Lawton Chiles' 1990 gubernatorial campaign, where the former US senator won the election having fund-raised with "$10 and $100 donations. If I ever thought I could do that, man I'd be off and running."

== Non-political work ==
Dantzler was admitted to The Florida Bar in 1983. Prior to accepting appointment to the FSA position, Dantzler led the Tampa/Winter Haven, Florida branch of Morgan & Morgan's Business Trial Group. As of May 2018, he worked for the Winter Haven law firm Victor Smith Law Group, specializing in agricultural law, representing property owners, mediation, environmental law, and general civil litigation.

On July 24, 2018, Dantzler was hired by the Citrus Research and Development Foundation (CRDF)—an agency overseeing scientific research against citrus greening—as their new chief operating officer, a position carrying an annual salary of $155,000 (equivalent to about $199,000 in 2025). In this role, Dantzler was to administer the CRDF's $16 million July 2018 – June 2019 budget (equivalent to about $24M in 2025), as well as educate Florida citrus growers about the CRDF. Dantzler was the CRDF board's second choice for the position after Elizabeth Stobierski withdrew from consideration. By February 2020, Dantzler was the CRDF's executive director.
