= Betty Skelton =

American aerobatic pilot, auto test driver, and advertising executive

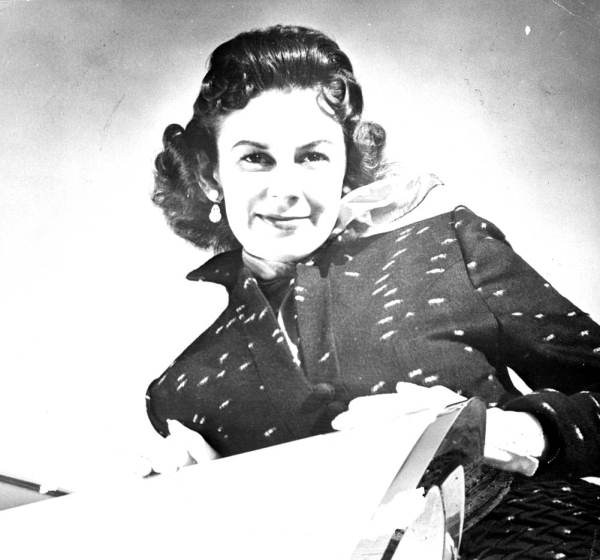
- Born: June 28, 1926; Pensacola, Florida, U.S.
- Died: August 31, 2011 (aged 85); The Villages, Florida, U.S.
- Occupations: Aerobatic pilot, test driver, advertising executive
- Spouses: Donald Frankman (m. 1965; died 2001) Dr. Allan Erde (m. 2005)
- Children: 3
- Parent(s): Myrtle and David Skelton

Betty Skelton Frankman Erde (June 28, 1926 – August 31, 2011) was an American aerobatics pilot, test driver, and advertising executive who set 17 aviation and automobile records. Known as "The First Lady of Firsts", she helped create opportunities for women in aviation, auto racing, astronautics, and advertising.

== Early years ==
She was born Betty Skelton in Pensacola, Florida on June 28, 1926. Her parents were teenagers and she was their only child. As a toddler, she was fascinated by the airplanes that flew over her home near the Naval Air Station and preferred model airplanes over dolls. When she turned eight, she started reading books on aviation and made her parents realize that she was serious about flying. Whenever they could, the family spent time at the municipal airport. She would talk pilots into letting her ride on local flights.

Kenneth Wright, a Navy ensign, took a special interest in the Skeltons and provided instruction to Betty and her parents. He allowed her to solo in his Taylorcraft airplane when she was 12 years old, which was not permitted. After receiving her Civil Aviation Authority private pilot's license at age 16, she qualified for the Women Airforce Service Pilots (WASP) program, but the minimum age was 18½, so she was forced to wait. WASP participants ferried Air Force pilots and aircraft to their duty stations, and it was the only flying program that accepted women. However, it was discontinued four months before Skelton reached the required age.

While she was a teenager, Skelton flew whenever she could. She graduated from high school in 1944 and wanted a career in aviation, so she claimed to be 18 to get a job with Eastern Airlines as a clerk, working at night. The job allowed her to rent planes and fly during the day. She earned ratings for single and multiengine on land and sea. At age 18, she received her commercial pilot licence and was certified as a flight instructor the following year, so she began teaching at Tampa's Peter O. Knight Airport. She joined the Civil Air Patrol a few years after it was formed in 1941.

== Aerobatics ==
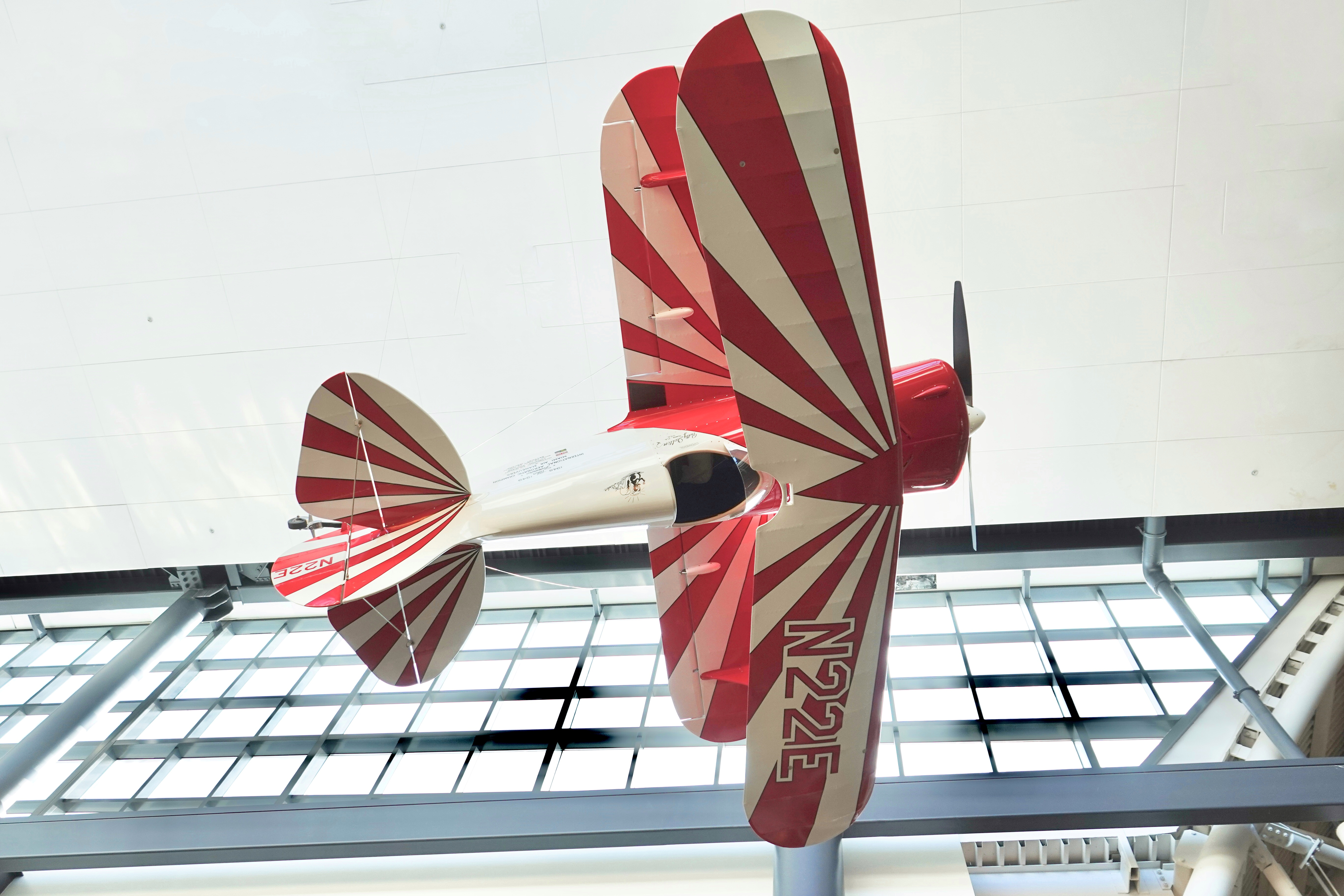
Little Stinker in the Smithsonian

Skelton's father, David, organized an amateur airshow in 1945 to raise funds for the local Jaycees. The airport manager in Tampa suggested that Skelton perform some basic stunts, but she had never done aerobatics. She borrowed a Fairchild PT-19 and Clem Whitteneck, a famous aerobatic pilot from the 1930s, taught her to loop and roll. Within two weeks, she had honed her skills and mastered simple aerobatic maneuvers, which she repeated for the air show. Because neither the military nor commercial airlines would accept a female pilot, air shows provided the only opportunity for her to work as a pilot, other than instructing. In 1946, she purchased a 1929 Great Lakes 2T-1A Sport Trainer biplane and performed at the Southeastern Air Exposition, held in Jacksonville, Florida. That was the start of her professional aerobatic career, and also that of the Blue Angels, a new US Navy precision-flying exhibition team. Skelton's repertoire included dozens of acrobatic tricks, but her most impressive maneuver involved cutting a ribbon strung between two fishing poles with her propeller, while flying upside down 10 feet (3.0 m) off the ground. She held the rank of major in the CAP and became a test pilot. Besides piston-driven airplanes, she also flew blimps, gliders, helicopters, and jets.

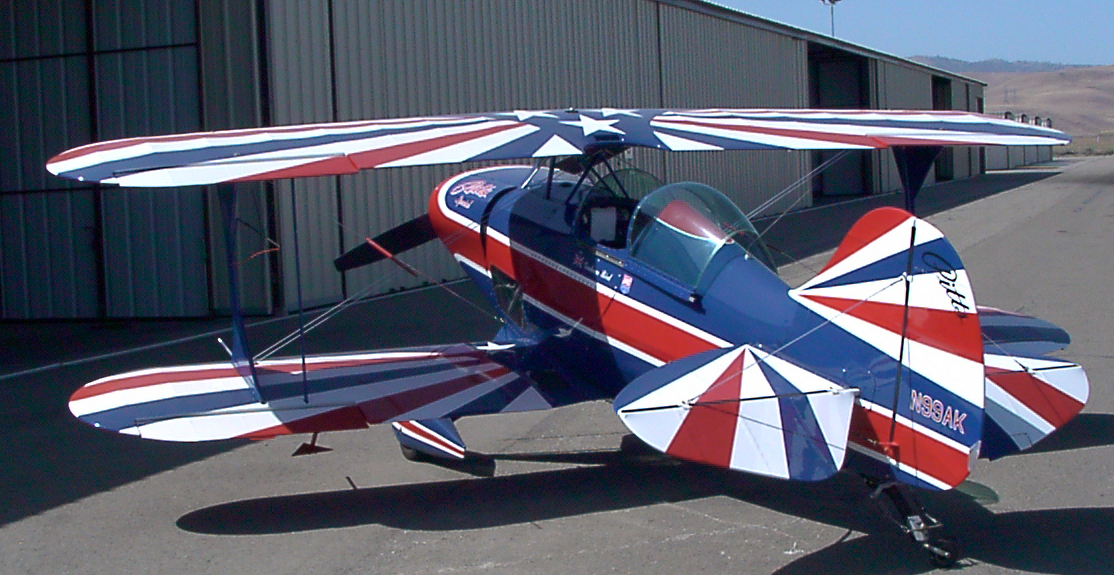
S-1S

After winning the championship in 1948, she bought a rare Pitts Special — a lightweight, open-cockpit (544 pounds (247 kg)) biplane designed and hand built by Curtis Pitts for aerobatics. The plane was repainted a dramatic red and white, and Skelton's Chihuahua, Little Tinker, outfitted with a custom-made working parachute, flew in her lap.

Skelton was US Female Aerobatic Champion in 1948, 1949, and 1950. Her last two championships made her and her plane, Little Stinker, famous. After her third championship, she was frustrated because no other challenges existed in aerobatics, and she was mentally and physically exhausted from the hectic, nonstop air-show circuit. She retired from aerobatics and sold the plane in 1951, but her first husband Don Frankman and she reacquired the airplane and donated it to the Smithsonian in 1985. Little Stinker is now on inverted display at the Steven F. Udvar-Hazy Center at Washington Dulles International Airport, part of the National Air and Space Museum.

In 1949, she set the world light-plane altitude record of 25,763 feet (7,853 m) in a Piper Cub. Two years later, she broke her own altitude record with a flight of 29,050 feet (8,850 m), also in a Piper Cub. She held the world speed record for piston-engined aircraft: 421.6 mph (678.5 km/h) over a 3-km course in a P-51 Mustang racing plane.

She became hostess of Van Wilson's Greeting Time, a radio show in 1950.

== Land racing ==
Skelton moved to Raleigh, North Carolina, in 1951 and piloted charter flights. In 1953, the founder of NASCAR asked her to fly some auto racers from Pennsylvania to North Carolina.

A friend, Bill France Sr., invited her to Daytona Beach, Florida, during speed week in February 1954. There, she drove the pace car at Daytona, then climbed into a Dodge sedan and was clocked at 105.88 mph (170.40 km/h) on the beach sand, setting a stock-car speed record for women. Skelton had discovered her second passion.

She was granted an Automobile Association of America auto race driver's license, as the first woman with that distinction. She became the first female test driver in the auto industry in 1954 with Chrysler's Dodge division. She drove the jump boat, L’il Miss Dodge, in a movie stunt above a 1955 Custom Royal Lancer at Cypress Gardens in Florida. During that time, she also tried skydiving.

The National Aviation Hall of Fame reports, "Betty earned a total of four Feminine World Land Speed Records and set a transcontinental speed record." She competed in races across the Andes mountains in South America and drove the length of the Baja Peninsula in Mexico. She set records at the Chelsea Proving Grounds and was the first woman to drive a jet car over 300 mph (480 km/h) at the Bonneville Salt Flats. She also set three women's land speed records at the Daytona Beach Road Course, the last one being 156.99 mph (252.65 km/h) in 1956. That same year, she broke Cannonball Baker's 40-year record for the Transcontinental Auto Race from New York to Los Angeles.

=== GM ===
In 1956, she became an advertising executive with Campbell-Ewald and worked with General Motors on and in their TV and print ads. She was GM's first woman technical narrator at major auto shows, where she would talk about and demonstrate automobile features, later becoming official spokeswoman for Chevrolet. While Skelton was working with Chevrolet, she set numerous records with Corvettes, and owned a total of 10 models. Between 1956 and 1957, Harley Earl and Bill Mitchell designed a special, translucent gold Corvette for her, which she drove to Daytona in 1957 to serve as the NASCAR pace car. She helped launch Corvette News, the company's internal employee magazine, and served as its editor for many years. The publication is now known as Corvette Quarterly. She became vice president of Campbell-Ewald's new Women's Market and Advertising department in 1969, then retired in 1976 after 20 years in advertising.

== Astronautics ==
In 1959, Skelton was the first woman to undergo NASA's physical and psychological tests, identical to those given to the Mercury Seven astronauts. NASA administered the tests at the request of Look for an article. She met and charmed the astronauts with her personality, then impressed them with her pilot skills. They nicknamed her "7½", and she was featured on the February 2, 1960 cover of Look. The United States Navy even awarded her honorary wings. However, nothing changed. "I complained that NASA wasn't giving more thought to women pilots... I wanted very much to fly in the Navy... But all they would do is laugh when I asked."

== Personal life ==
Skelton married Hollywood TV director/producer and Navy veteran Donald A. Frankman in 1965. They moved to Florida in 1976, where she kept a seaplane docked at their lakefront home in Winter Haven. She became a real estate agent in 1977 and published her book, Little Stinker. At the end of the century, Skelton was taking care of her ailing husband, who died in 2001, and she flew less often. "I just felt I wasn't as safe as I used to be," she said.

In 2005, she married Dr. Allan Erde, a retired naval surgeon, and they resided in The Villages, Florida. Both in their 80s, they lived in a retirement community where most residents used golf carts for transportation. Skelton drove a Corvette convertible with a color that nearly matched her red hair.

She died on August 31, 2011.

== Hall of Fame inductions ==
- Florida Sports Hall of Fame, 1977
- International Motorsports Hall of Fame
- NASCAR International Automotive Hall of Fame, 1983 - the 1st woman
- International Aerobatic Club Hall of Fame, 1988
- Florida Women's Hall of Fame, 1993
- Women in Aviation, Pioneer Hall of Fame, 1997
- Corvette Hall of Fame, 2001
- International Council of Air Shows Foundation Hall of Fame, 2003
- National Aviation Hall of Fame, 2005
- Motorsports Hall of Fame of America, 2008

Automotive Hall of Fame, 2025

== Honors ==
Bill France stated, "I would venture to say there is no other woman in the world with all the attributes of this woman. The most impressive of them all is her surprising and outstanding ever-present femininity, even when tackling a man's job".

In 1988, the International Aerobatic Club established the Betty Skelton First Lady of Aerobatics Trophy, awarded to the highest-scoring woman pilot at the United States National Aerobatic Championships.
