= 1998 Florida gubernatorial election =

- November 3, 1998
- Turnout: 49.5%
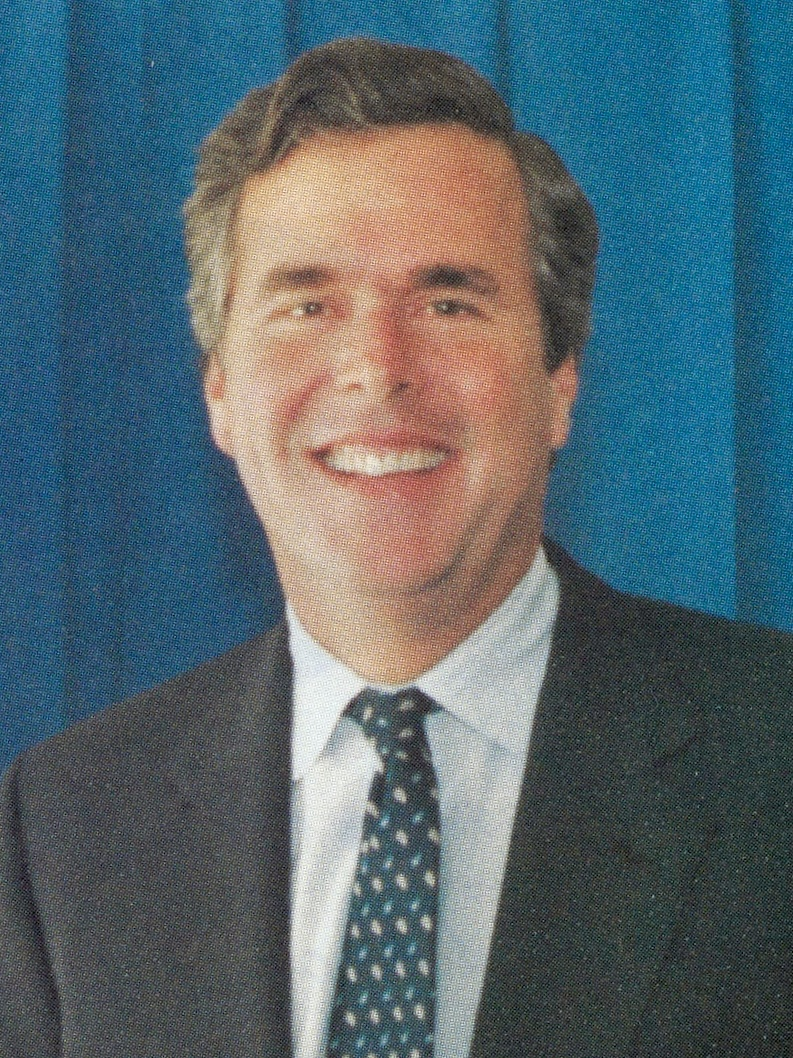

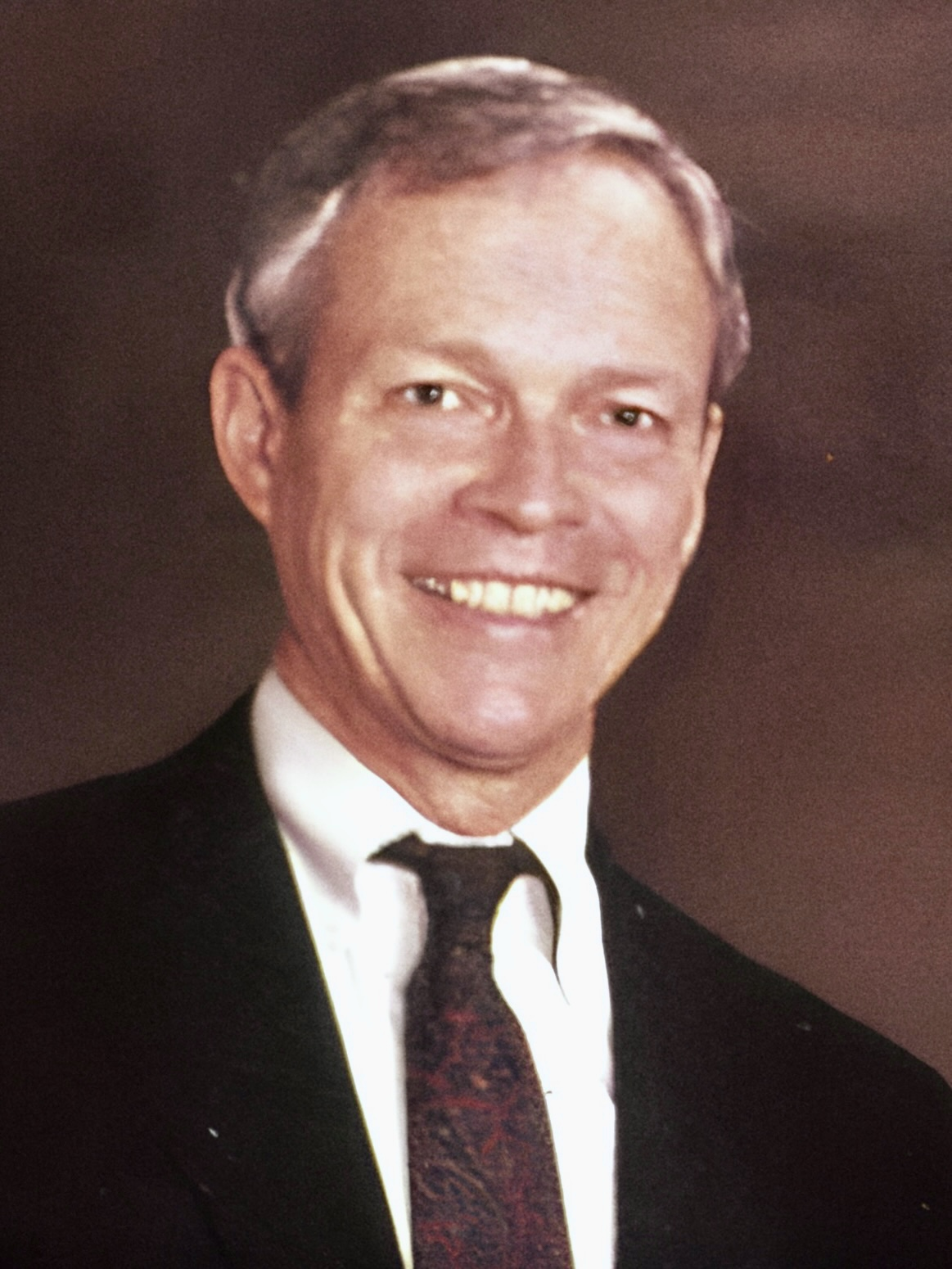
Nominee	Jeb Bush	Buddy MacKay
Party	Republican	Democratic
Running mate	Frank Brogan	Rick Dantzler
Popular vote	2,191,105	1,773,054
Percentage	55.27%	44.72%
- Bush: 50–60% 60–70% 70–80% 80–90% >90% MacKay: 50–60% 60–70% 70–80% 80–90% >90% Tie: 40–50% 50% No votes
Governor before election
Lawton Chiles
Democratic
Elected Governor
Jeb Bush
Republican

The 1998 Florida gubernatorial election was held on November 3, 1998, to determine the governor and lieutenant governor of Florida. Democratic incumbent Lawton Chiles was term-limited and could not run for re-election. Jeb Bush, who had run for governor in 1994, defeated lieutenant governor Buddy MacKay by nearly 11 percent of the vote.

Primary elections were held on September 1. The primary campaign was largely uneventful, as MacKay and Bush officially ran unopposed for their respective nominations. The lack of competitiveness saw a very low turnout of just 16.6% of voters for the primary.

Bush was one of four Republicans to gain a governorship for their party in the 1998 gubernatorial elections. With his win, Republicans won a trifecta in the state for the first time since 1875. This was the second election in which MacKay had unsuccessfully run to succeed Chiles, the first being the 1988 Senate race.

== Democratic primary ==
=== Candidates ===
- Buddy MacKay, incumbent lieutenant governor of Florida

==== Withdrew ====
- Rick Dantzler, state senator from Winter Haven (ran for lieutenant governor)
- J. Keith Arnold, state representative from Fort Myers (ran for education commissioner)

=== Campaign ===
Initially the Democratic primary saw a three-way race between MacKay, Rick Dantzler and J. Keith Arnold, but the latter two dropped out early. Dantzler became MacKay's running mate, and Arnold ran for Education Commissioner.

=== Results ===
Democratic primary results
Party	Candidate	Votes	%
Democratic	Buddy MacKay	1,244,044	100.00%

== Republican primary ==
=== Candidates ===
- Jeb Bush, businessman, 1994 nominee, and member of the Bush family

=== Results ===
Republican primary results
Party	Candidate	Votes	%
Republican	Jeb Bush	998,566	100.00%

== General election ==
=== Candidates ===
- Jeb Bush, businessman, 1994 nominee, and member of the Bush family (Republican)
  - Running mate: Frank Brogan, Florida education commissioner
- Buddy MacKay, incumbent lieutenant governor of Florida (Democratic)
  - Running mate: Rick Dantzler, state senator from Winter Haven

=== Campaign ===
Jeb Bush enjoyed double-digit leads in polling through most of the campaign, and had a large fundraising advantage over MacKay. Bush attempted to revamp his image after appearing too hard-right during the 1994 race. Internal struggles amongst key Democratic constituencies, particularly the African-American community, hurt MacKay. MacKay and the Florida Democratic party drew the ire of the black community after state representative Willie Logan, poised to become the first black speaker of the Florida House, was ousted by party leaders. Logan endorsed Bush in the general election.

Meanwhile, after receiving only 5% of the African-American vote in 1994, Bush sought to connect to minorities, a group he admittedly ignored in 1994. Setting a tone of compassionate conservatism, and portraying himself as a "consensus-building pragmatist," he met with African American leaders, and reached out to Jews and Hispanics. He introduced his Mexican-born wife Columba on the campaign trail, and demonstrated his fluent bi-lingual abilities, particularly in South Florida. MacKay ran from behind for the entire race, and barely managed closed to gap to ten points in the days leading up to the general election.

On election day, Bush won by almost 11%. He garnered 61% of the Hispanic vote and 14% of the African American vote, a surprising showing for a Republican seeking statewide office. With his brother George W. Bush winning re-election in Texas, the two brothers became the first siblings to govern two states at the same time since Nelson and Winthrop Rockefeller governed New York and Arkansas from 1967 to 1971. Despite his strong statewide showing, Bush was unable to provide coattails for other Republicans further down the ticket. Charlie Crist was easily defeated in his Senate race, and House Republicans did not pick up any seats in the midterms. In the state legislature, the GOP netted no new Senate seats, and picked up only two seats in the House.

A little over a month after the election, Lawton Chiles died suddenly of a heart attack. Buddy MacKay, still the sitting lieutenant governor, was sworn in as the 42nd governor of Florida on December 13, 1998, and served out the final 23 days of Chiles' second term. In an ironic twist, MacKay managed to serve in the office he lost the race for, but stated "There's no great pleasure in this." MacKay oversaw the state funeral of Chiles, and made a handful of minor appointments, before Bush was sworn in as the 43rd Governor on January 5, 1999.

=== Polling ===
Poll source	Date(s)	Sample size (Note: Key: A – all adults RV – registered voters LV – likely voters V – unclear)	Margin of error	Buddy MacKay (D)	Jeb Bush (R)	Other / undecided (Note: Calculated by taking the difference of 100% and all other candidates combined.)
Harris Insights & Analytics	October 30, 1998	2,819	—	41%	58%	1%
Mason-Dixon Polling & Strategy	October 26–28, 1998	822 (LV)	± 3.5%	43%	51%	6%
Tarrance Group (R) (Note: Poll conducted for an unspecified Republican sponsor.)	October 26, 1998	600	—	40%	52%	8%
Forman Center for Political Studies/University of Florida (Note: Poll sponsored by the Florida Voter Monthly Journal)	October 18–25, 1998	557 (LV)	± 4.0%	43%	51%	6%
SurveyUSA	October 24, 1998	500	—	41%	53%	6%
Independent Market Research of Tampa (Note: Poll sponsored by the St. Petersburg Times)	October 21–23, 1998	670 (LV)	± 3.8%	40%	51%	9%
Forman Center	October 22, 1998	557	—	43%	51%	6%
Independent Market Research	October 22, 1998	670	—	40%	51%	9%
Harris Insights & Analytics	October 20, 1998	2,295	—	40%	56%	4%
Mason-Dixon Polling & Strategy	October 15–18, 1998	836 (LV)	± .%	41%	51%	8%
Mason-Dixon Polling & Strategy	September 22–24, 1998	815 (LV)	± 3.5%	37%	52%	11%
Forman Center for Political Studies/University of Florida	September 9–23, 1998	403 (LV)	± 5.0%	38%	55%	7%
Mason-Dixon Polling & Strategy	August 24–25, 1998	804 (LV)	± 3.5%	35%	51%	14%
Mason-Dixon Polling & Strategy	July 17–20, 1998	802 (LV)	± 3.5%	34%	54%	12%
Forman Center for Political Studies/University of Florida	July 7–23, 1998	600 (RV)	± 4.0%	38%	50%	12%
Forman Center for Political Studies/University of Florida	May 9–28, 1998	608 (RV)	± 4.0%	38%	51%	11%
Forman Center for Political Studies/University of Florida	March 7–22, 1998	608 (RV)	± 4.0%	39%	50%	11%
Forman Center for Political Studies/University of Florida	January 8–20, 1998	607 (RV)	± 4.0%	42%	47%	11%

=== Results ===
1998 Florida gubernatorial election
Party	Candidate	Votes	%
Republican	Jeb Bush	2,191,105	55.27%
Democratic	Buddy MacKay	1,773,054	44.72%
Write-in		282	0.01%
Total votes		3,964,441	100.00%
Republican gain from Democratic			

== Aftermath ==
On December 12, 1998, Chiles suddenly died of a heart attack less than three weeks due to end of his term, thrusting MacKay into the governor's office, for which he had just lost the election, for 24 days.

== Videos ==
(1) Midterm Election Coverage, which includes Bush's victory speech from November 3, 1998

(2) Florida Gubernatorial Debate from October 20, 1998

(3) Florida Gubernatorial Debate from October 3, 1998

== Notes ==
Partisan clients
