= Kingman Airport =

Kingman Airport may refer to:

- Kingman Airport (Arizona) in Kingman, Arizona, United States (FAA: IGM)
- Kingman Airport (Kansas) in Kingman, Kansas, United States (FAA: 9K8)
