= Florida Sports Hall of Fame =

The Florida Sports Hall of Fame (FSHOF) is an association dedicated to honoring athletes, coaches and other non-athletes with outstanding achievement in sports in Florida. It has expanded its goals to include encouraging physical fitness among Florida's citizens through the example of its honorees.

The FSHOF was founded by the Florida Sports Writers Association and the Florida Sportscasters Association in 1958, but first opened in 1977 at Cypress Gardens in Winter Haven. It closed in 1985, then moved north to Lake City, Florida in 1990. Attendance there was never high enough to support the operation, and Florida governor Jeb Bush vetoed state funding in 2002, leaving the Hall $90,000 in debt. Hall of Fame exhibits and memorabilia were placed in storage while the board of directors tried to find a home. The FSHOF considered building a location in St. Petersburg, but was unable to reach an acceptable arrangement. The Lake Myrtle Sports Complex, which began construction in Auburndale, Florida in August, 2008 offered a home to the facility, and on June 22, 2010, the facility reopened and inducted four new members: Catie Ball-Condon, Jack Hairston, Pat Borders and Hubert Green.

== Alphabetical listing of members ==
=== A through C ===
- 1972 Miami Dolphins (2000)
- Randy Ableman (2015)
- Ruth Alexander (2004)
- Michelle Akers (2003)
- Lonni Alameda (2025)
- Bobby Allison (1986)
- Donnie Allison (2000)
- Mike Alstott (2025)
- Dick Anderson (2012)
- Nick Anderson (2019)
- Ottis Anderson (1991)
- Dave Andreychuk (2011)
- Rick Ankiel (2022)
- Don Aronow (1975)
- Paul Azinger (2004)
- Catie Ball (2010)
- Walter L. "Red" Barber (1979)
- Rick Barry (1967)
- Andy Bean (2000)
- Deane Beman (1984)
- Brooke Bennett (2013)
- Patty Berg (1961)
- Fred Biletnikoff (1970)
- Otis Birdsong (2008)
- Bennie Blades (2015)
- Otis Boggs (1990)
- Wade Boggs (2003)
- Nick Bollettieri (2004)
- Tommy Bolt (1980)
- Pat Borders (2010)
- Julius Boros (1966)
- Tony Boselli (2011)
- Don Bosseler (2000)
- Bobby Bowden (1983)
- Scot Brantley (1996)
- Derrick Brooks (2011)
- Jerome Brown (2004)
- Bill Buchalter (2007)
- Nick Buoniconti (1995)
- Lew Burdette (1998)
- Trey Burton (2025)
- LeRoy Butler (2023)
- Norm Carlson (1995)
- Steve Carlton (1989)
- Harold Carmichael (2004)
- Ricky Carmichael (2025)
- JoAnne Carner (1988)
- Jimmy Carnes (1984)
- Don Carter (1997)
- Gary Carter (1998)
- Paula Carter (2015)
- Vince Carter (2023)
- Rick Casares (1972)
- Charles Casey (1968)
- Tracy Caulkins (1988)
- Wes Chandler (1992)
- Chandra Cheeseborough (2007)
- Dean Chenoweth (1982)
- Torchy Clark (19903)
- Pete Clemons (2013)
- Greg Coleman (2023)
- Jerry Collins (1993)
- Cris Collinsworth (1990)
- Jeff Conine (2015)
- Pete Cooper (1987)
- Joey Cornblit (2015)
- Lee Corso (2003)
- Tom Coughlin (2023)
- Jim Courier (2003)
- Dave Cowens (1973)
- Gene Cox (1988)
- Russ Cozart (2012)
- Larry Csonka (1991)
- Hugh Culverhouse (1993)
- Fran Curci (1997)

=== D through I ===
- Johnny Damon (2016)
- Darryl Dawkins (2008)
- Andre Dawson (1990)
- Gene Deckerhoff (2000)
- Bill Diaz (2021)
- Jim Dooley (1998)
- Winston Dubose (2019)
- Herb Dudley (1985)
- Angelo Dundee (1969)
- Tony Dungy (2015)
- Pete Dunn (2019)
- Warrick Dunn (2017)
- Hugh Durham (1999)
- Phil Esposito (2016)
- James Everett (1995)
- Chris Evert (1975)
- J. Rex Farrior (1978)
- Forest K. Ferguson (1961)
- Joe Fields (1996)
- Tim Finchem (2017)
- Sam Finley (2006)
- Leiza Fitzgerald (2022)
- Don Fleming (1963)
- Raymond Floyd (1997)
- William Floyd (2024)
- Edward L. "Eddie" Flynn (1974)
- Jeremy Foley (2016)
- Bill France Sr. (1963)
- Bill France Jr. (1999)
- Betty Skelton Frankman Erde (1977)
- Ron Fraser (1986)
- Shirley Fry (1970)
- Rowdy Gaines (1986)
- Jake Gaither (1970)
- Willie Galimore (1961)
- Justin Gatlin (2018)
- Don Garlits (1972)
- Steve Garvey (1975)
- Ben Geraghty (1975)
- Althea Gibson (1984)
- Artis Gilmore (1974)
- Lafayette G. Golden (1961)
- Luis Gonzalez (2022)
- Mary Ann Gonzalez (2004)
- Linda Gooch (2024)
- Brian Gottfried (2013)
- Curt Gowdy (1999)
- Ray Graves (1972)
- Hubert Green (2010)
- Peter Gregg (1977)
- Bob Griese (1979)
- Jon Gruden (2016)
- Andy Gustafson (1969)
- Jack Hairston (2010)
- Nicole Haislett (2005)
- Tim Hardaway (2013)
- Jack Harding (1967)
- Ashlyn Harris (2024)
- Doris Hart (1978)
- Bill Hartack (1962)
- "Bullet" Bob Hayes (1970)
- Hurley Haywood (1993)
- Ted Hendricks (1976)
- Nash Higgins (1980)
- Renee Hildebrand (2022)
- Sonny Hirsch (2015)
- Hulk Hogan (2007)
- Nancy Hogshead (1995)
- Mike Holloway (2024)
- Dick Howser (2012)
- Marcelino Huerta (1981)
- Wayne Huizenga (1996)
- Mick Hubert (2018)
- Fred Hutchinson (1968)
- Scott Hutchinson (2024)
- Michael Irvin (2007)

=== J through Q ===
- Jeff Johnson (2023)
- Dexter Jackson (2022)
- Julian Jackson (1994)
- Davey Johnson (1998)
- Jimmy Johnson (1998)
- Allison Jolly (2016)
- Chipper Jones (2017)
- Deacon Jones (1983)
- James Jones (2022)
- Roy Jones Jr. (2018)
- Joan Joyce (2012)
- Joe Justice (1999)
- Jim Kelly (1998)
- Gary Koch (2012)
- Bernie Kosar (2006)
- Nick Kotys (1984)
- Al Lang (1962)
- Elaine Larsen (2023)
- Floyd E. Lay (1981)
- Henry Lawrence (2012)
- Vincent Lecavalier (2022)
- Al Leiter (2021)
- Jim Leyland (2025)
- Bernie Little (1979)
- David Little (2019)
- Larry Little (1978)
- John Henry Lloyd (1998)
- Al López (1961)
- Greg Louganis (1999)
- Roberto Luongo (2021)
- Dan Marino (2003)
- Mike Martin (2005)
- Roland Martin (2012)
- Tino Martinez (2007)
- Bob Masterson (1991)
- Walter "Tiger" Mayberry (1964)
- Dick Mayer (1966)
- Jack "Cy" McClairen (1988)
- Mark McCumber (2013)
- Jack McDowall (1978)
- Tom McEwen (1989)
- Tracy McGrady (2024)
- Fred McGriff (2012)
- Bill McGrotha (1997)
- Hal McRae (1986)
- Steve Melnyk (2000)
- Clyde Metcalf (2025)
- Shannon Miller (2023)
- George Mira (1997)
- Hubert Mizell (2008)
- Nat Moore (1998)
- Earl Morrall (2000)
- Jim Morris (2021)
- Perry Moss (1995)
- Alonzo Mourning (2021)
- Gardnar Mulloy (1973)
- Robert Allan Murphy (1968)
- Needles (1974)
- Jack Nelson (1992)
- Jack Nicklaus (1972)
- Chris Nikic (2022)
- Greg Norman (2006)
- Tom Nugent (1986)
- Stephen C. O'Connell (1997)
- Pam Oliver (2022)
- George R. Olsen (1975)
- Buck O'Neil (1999)
- Charles Owens (1987)
- Dick Pace (1985)
- Arnold Palmer (1985)
- Jerry Pate (2018)
- Chris Patrick (2024)
- John Pennel (1971)
- Newt Perry (1981)
- Bill Peterson (1975)
- Pete Pihos (2018)
- Lou Piniella (1977)
- Dick Pope Jr. (1975)
- Dick Pope Sr. (1981)
- Edwin Pope (1996)
- Boog Powell (1980)
- Paul Quinn (1989)

=== R through Z ===
- Tim Raines (1987)
- Jim Rathmann (1978)
- Ed Reed (2021)
- Dot Richardson (1999)
- Bobby Riggs (1995)
- Rick Rhoden (1999)
- Fred Ridley (2022)
- Ken Riley (1992)
- Joe Robbie (1990)
- Dave Roberts (2012)
- Glenn "Fireball" Roberts (1961)
- Robin Roberts (1998)
- Chi Chi Rodriguez (1991)
- Corky Rogers (2013)
- Chuck Rohe (2019)
- Tony Romeo (1999)
- Al Rosen (1967)
- Pete Sampras (2005)
- Deion Sanders (2005)
- Doug Sanders (1972)
- Gene Sarazen (1980)
- Herb Score (1982)
- Howard Schnellenberger (2005)
- Pancho Segura (2004)
- Earnie Seiler (1974)
- Monica Seles (2006)
- Ron Sellers (1973)
- Lee Roy Selmon (1989)
- Rip Sewell (1982)
- Gary Sheffield (2018)
- Frank Shorter (1993)
- Don Shula (1973)
- Hal Smeltzy (1987)
- Barry Smith (2022)
- Emmitt Smith (2006)
- George Smith (2012)
- Michelle Snow (2018)
- Freddie Solomon (1994)
- Annika Sorenstam (2019)
- Steve Spurrier (1970)
- George Steinbrenner (1982)
- Dwight Stephenson (2021)
- Jan Stephenson (2024)
- Payne Stewart (2005)
- Lyn St. James (1994)
- Roger Strickland (1996)
- Pat Summerall (1979)
- Don Sutton (1984)
- Mark Swiconek (2005)
- Charlie Tate (1988)
- Fred Taylor (2013)
- Zack Taylor (1974)
- Tim Tebow (2017)
- Vinny Testaverde (2006)
- Zach Thomas (2015)
- Dara Torres (2021)
- Gino Torretta (2011)
- James Van Fleet (1977)
- Dale Van Sickel (1976)
- John Vanbiesbrouck (2015)
- Jason Varitek (2019)
- Don Veller (1985)
- Dick Vitale (1996)
- Lisa Wagner (2022)
- Colleen Walker (2017)
- Don Wallen (1987)
- Paul Waner (1964)
- Charlie Ward (2012)
- Paul Warfield (1992)
- Lois Webb (2019)
- Chris Weinke (2019)
- Glenn Wilkes (1981)
- Pat Williams (2019)
- Ted Williams (1997)
- Dave Wills (2025)
- Mary Wise (2011)
- Danny Wuerffel (2005)
- Early Wynn (1971)
- Leeroy Yarbrough (2013)
- Garo Yepremian (1982)
- Jack Youngblood (1975)
- Babe Zaharias (1964)
