= Mick Hubert =

American sports announcer

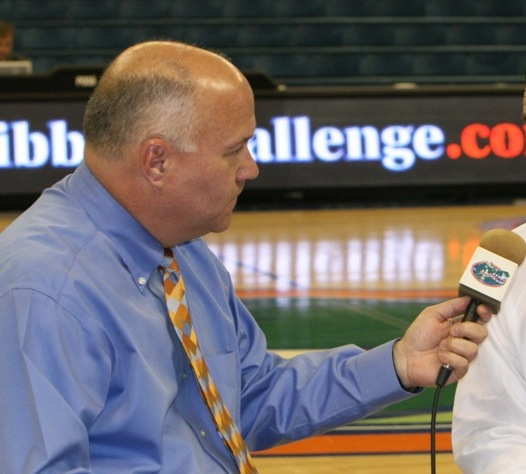
- Born: February 16, 1954 (age 72); St. Anne, Illinois, U.S.
- Education: Illinois State University
- Occupations: Radio play-by-play announcer & sportscaster
- Spouse: Judy Hubert

Mick Hubert (born February 16, 1954) is an American retired sportscaster and play-by-play announcer who served as the primary radio voice and media host for the Florida Gators sports programs at the University of Florida (UF) from 1989 through 2022. He was well known for his exuberant announcing style, highlighted by his use of the phrase "Oh my!" when excited by the action on the field.

== Early life and career ==
Hubert was born in St. Anne, Illinois and got his first broadcast experience calling high school football games on WMDB-AM in Peoria while a student at Illinois State University. He graduated with a degree in broadcast journalism in 1976, and in 1979, he became the sports director at WHIO-TV in Dayton, Ohio. During his 10 years at the station, he did radio and television play-by-play for Bradley University and University of Dayton athletic events, along with play-by-play for NCAA tournament games on ESPN.

== Voice of the Gators ==
In 1989, Hubert was hired as the lead radio announcer for Florida Gators football, men's basketball, and baseball broadcasts, taking over from David Steele, who left to work TV broadcasts for the expansion Orlando Magic of the National Basketball Association. Hubert was only the third Voice of the Gators, as original UF radio play-by-play announcer Otis Boggs held the position for over four decades before Steele's seven-year stint. Hubert remained in that role for the next thirty-three years.

Hubert worked alongside several color analysts during his 419 Florida football broadcasts, including former Gator players James Jones, Lee McGriff, and Shane Matthews. He handled play by play duties for over 1000 Florida basketball games with Bill Koss, Mark Wise, and Lee Humphrey as well as over 1000 baseball games, mostly with Nick Belmonte and Jeff Cardozo. In addition, he did occasional radio or television play by play for various other Florida sports teams, served as the host for coaches' radio and television shows, and was involved in the production of most of the radio and video content released by the UF athletic department during his career at the school.

As the radio play by play voice of the Gators, Hubert called Florida's victories in the 1996, 2006, and 2008 national championship football games, the 2006 and 2007 NCAA Division I men's basketball tournament finals, and the 2017 College World Series, making him the only radio announcer to ever call championships in all three major collegiate sports for the same university.

=== "Doering's got a touchdown!" ===
Hubert was known at Florida for his extensive preparation, his coining of nicknames for Gator players, and "passionate" announcing style. He first came to prominence after the Gators' last-minute win at Kentucky on September 11, 1993. His energetic yelling of "DOERING'S GOT A TOUCHDOWN! DOERING'S GOT A TOUCHDOWN! OHHHH MY!" in describing the game-winning touchdown pass from Danny Wuerffel to Chris Doering was extensively replayed on national sports networks and became so well known that it was featured in the ESPN films SEC Storied documentary "More than a Voice" almost thirty years later. Over the ensuing decades, his enthusiastic radio calls (including his use of "Oh my!", which he attributed to the influence of long-time sportscaster Dick Enberg) were often used by national sports media when featuring highlights of Gator games.

=== Retirement ===
Hubert announced his retirement in 2022 to spend more time with his family. His last call as "Voice of the Gators" was during the Florida baseball team's final regular season series against South Carolina in May 2022 in which Hubert served as the play-by-play announcer for the SEC Network's coverage of the ballgame.

== Awards and recognitions ==
Hubert received many accolades during his long broadcasting career, beginning with two Emmy Awards for sports coverage while working at WHIO in the early 1980s. Later in his career, he was named the National Sports Media Association's Florida Sportscaster of the Year in 2017 and was inducted into the Florida Sports Hall of Fame in 2018.
