= Yucca Army Airfield =

Former airfield in Mohave County, Arizona

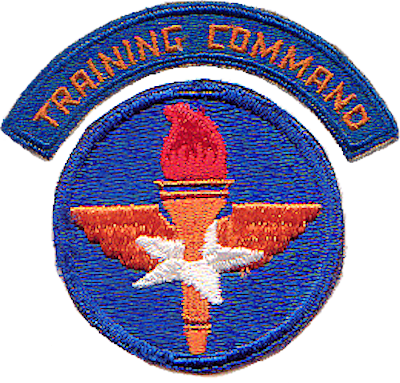
Yucca Army Airfield
- Part of Arizona World War II Army Airfields
- Mohave County, about 1-mile (1.6 km) west of Yucca, Arizona
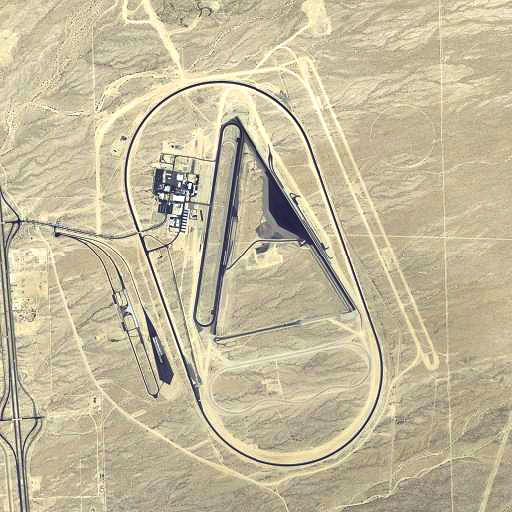
- 2006 USGS airphoto

Site information
- Type: USAAF training airfield
- Controlled by: United States Army Air Forces

Location
- Coordinates: 34°52′32″N 114°07′33″W

Site history
- Built: 1943
- In use: 1943–1946

Garrison information
- Garrison: 36th Flying Training Wing

Yucca Army Airfield is a former military airfield located about 1 mile (1.6 km) west of Yucca, in Mohave County, Arizona, United States. It is on the east side of Interstate 40, 25 miles (40 km) south of Kingman. It is now used as a private facility owned by Fiat Chrysler Automobiles named Chrysler Arizona Proving Grounds.

== Military use ==
In 1943–44, the US Army Air Forces acquired 2,284 acres (9.24 km^{2}) to build a satellite airfield for the use of Kingman AAF and its gunnery school. Activated on 1 December 1941, the facility consisted of two 6,000' asphalt runways, taxiways, control tower, 45 buildings, roads, a railroad spur, electrical utilities, water utilities, and a sewage disposal plant.

Yucca AAF was commanded by the 3019th Army Air Force Base Unit, part of the AAF's 36th Flying Training Wing, Western Flying Training Command. It was primarily a flexible gunnery school, with the adjoining Yucca Air to Air Gunnery Range being located to the southwest. It consisted of a total of 550,000 acres (2,200 km^{2}), and the range had four runways. Bell P-39 and P-63 fighters were used as gunnery targets at Yucca Aux AAF. B-26 bombers were also used as target tugs at Yucca AAF.

In addition to the main base, the adjoining Yucca Air to Air Gunnery Range was located to the southwest of Yucca AAF. It consisted of a total of 550,000 acres, and the range had four airfields. The civil Port Kingman Airport was also utilized as an auxiliary landing field:

- Cyclopic Army Auxiliary Airfield #1 35°44′22″N 114°04′39″W
- Hackberry Army Auxiliary Airfield #3 35°26′02″N 113°47′59″W
- Topock Army Auxiliary Airfield #5 34°43′46″N 114°26′20″W
- Lake Havasu Auxiliary Army Airfield #6 34°27′36″N 114°21′36″W
- Signal Auxiliary Army Airfield #7 34°22′18″N 113°54′42″W
- Port Kingman Airport 35°13′21″N 114°01′09″W

Yucca AAF was closed and turned over to the Army Division Engineers on 23 December 1945. It was declared surplus in 1946 and responsibility for it was given to the War Assets Administration.

== Civil use ==
In 1954 the Packard Motor Company acquired the airport facility and began using the runways for automobile testing. Ford eventually built an extensive automotive proving ground surrounding the airfield.

As of 2002, the airfield itself was still operated by Ford as a private airfield, known as the Arizona Proving Ground Airport. Ford also continued to use some of the original military facilities, including the control tower, runways, taxiways, and parking aprons. However, all of the original military buildings (except for the control tower) had been removed.

The Yucca airfield was evidently closed by Ford at some point between 2002 and 2006. As of 2018 the airport is listed as an abandoned paved runway.

In 2007 the airfield was sold to Chrysler, which now operates the Chrysler Arizona Proving Grounds at this location. Harley-Davidson Motor Company has entered into an agreement to use the vehicle test facility to test their motorcycles. Harley-Davidson occupies several buildings at the test facility, including at least one they custom built.

The USAAF technical site is now being used by buildings as part of the proving ground. The only wartime structure evident in aerial photos of the facility is the air traffic control tower. The wartime runways and taxiways are still in use.

== See also ==
- Chrysler Arizona Proving Grounds
- Arizona World War II Army Airfields
