= Kingman Airport (Arizona) =

Airfield in Mohave County, Arizona

Kingman Airport (former Kingman Army Airfield)
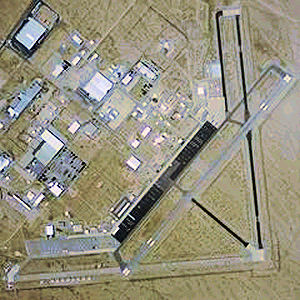
- USGS aerial image
- IATA: IGM; ICAO: KIGM; FAA LID: IGM; WMO: 72370

Summary
- Airport type: Public
- Owner: City of Kingman
- Serves: Kingman, Arizona
- Location: Mohave County, Arizona
- Elevation AMSL: 3,449 ft (1,051 m)
- Coordinates: 35°15′34″N 113°56′17″W
- Website: KingmanAirportAuthority.com

Map
- Location within Arizona Location within the United States

Runways
Direction	Length		Surface
Direction	ft	m	Surface
3/21	6,827	2,081	Asphalt
17/35	6,725	2,050	Asphalt

Statistics (2011)
- Aircraft operations: 44,137
- Based aircraft: 185
- Source: Federal Aviation Administration

Kingman Airport (IATA: IGM, ICAO: KIGM, FAA LID: IGM) is a city-owned, public-use airport located 9 miles (7.8 nmi; 14 km) northeast of the central business district of Kingman, a city in Mohave County, Arizona, United States.

Kingman Municipal Airport, also known as Kingman Army Airfield, was founded at the start of World War II and was one of the nation's largest aerial training bases. After the war, Kingman Airfield served as one of the nation's top reclamation sites for outdated military aircraft. It became open to civilian use in 1949. At that time, the Kingman Army Airfield Historical Society was established; it maintained records and artifacts from the site. In 2010, an inspection of the site revealed soil contamination, and from 2013 until July 2014, the land was rehabilitated for safe use, by removing the polycyclic aromatic hydrocarbon (PAHs) from the soil.

== History ==
Kingman Airport was built as a World War II United States Army Air Forces training field. Between 1942 and 1945 the U.S. Army Air Forces acquired about 4,145 acres in Mohave County outside of Kingman, Arizona and established the Kingman Army Airfield and Kingman Aerial Gunnery School training facilities in 1942.

=== Wartime Aircraft Gunnery School ===
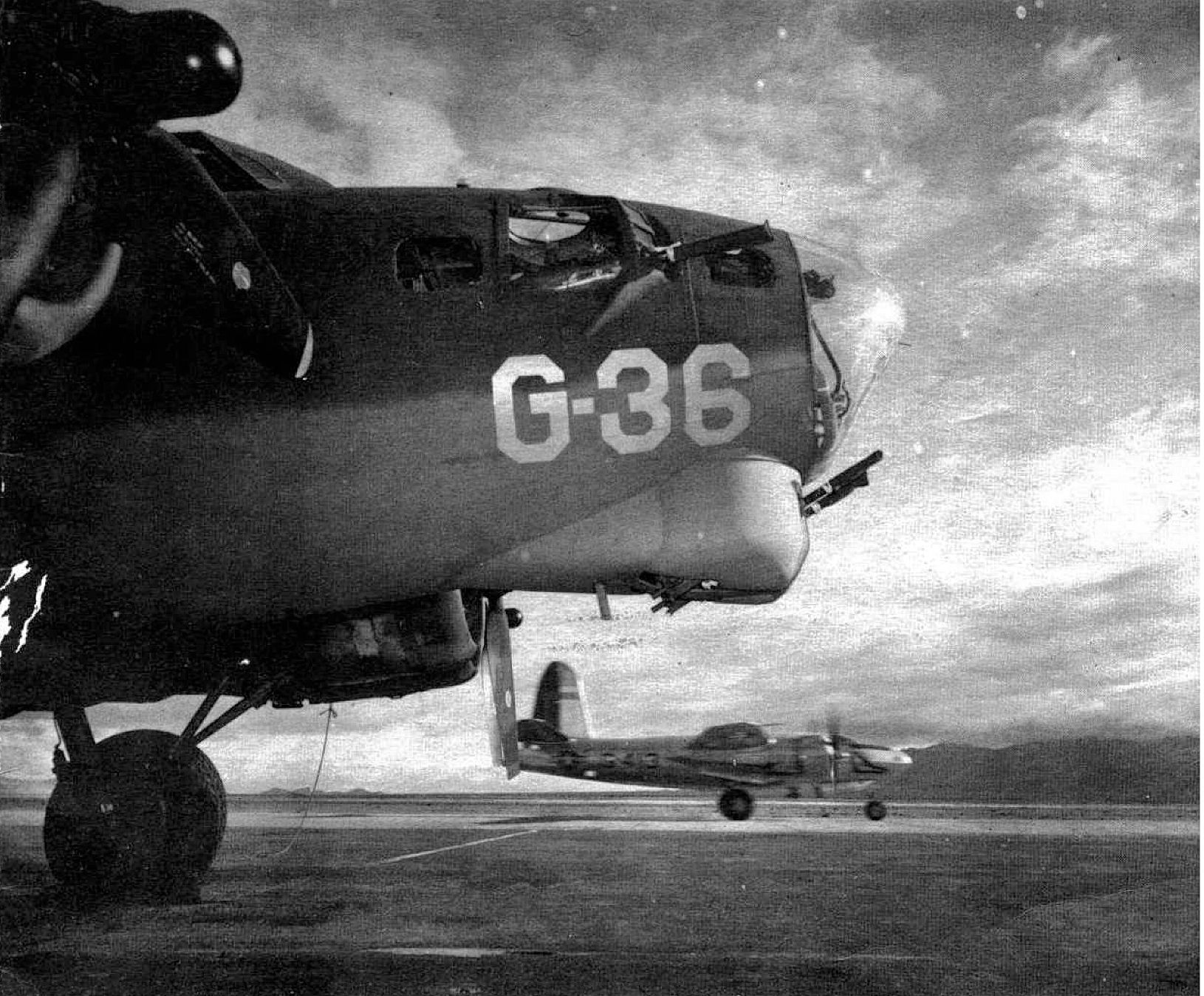
Aircraft for gunnery training, 1944

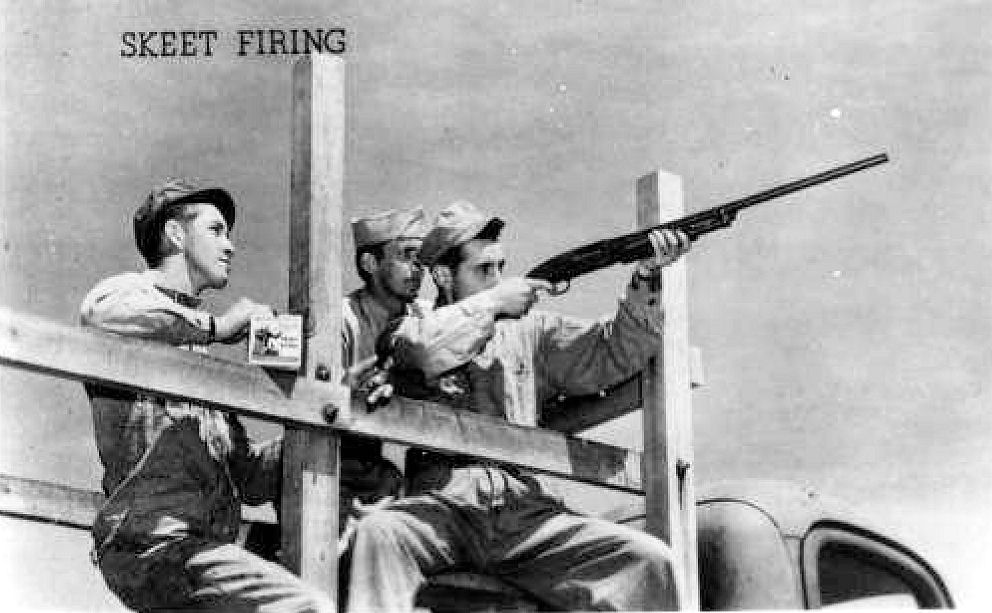
Skeet firing training, 1944

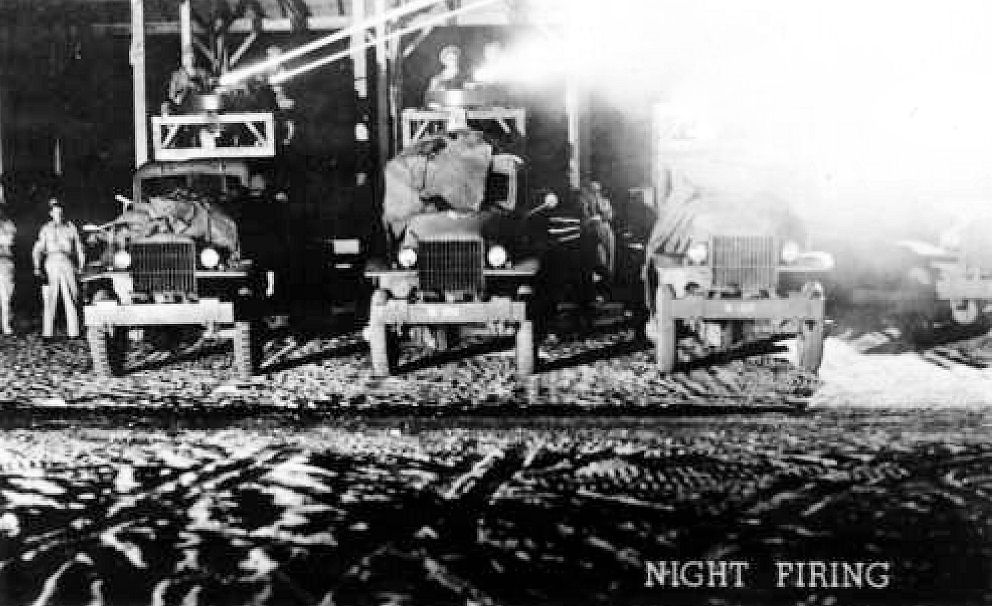
Night gunnery training, 1944

Kingman Army Airfield was established as a training base for Army Air Force aerial gunners. In addition to the main base, the Kingman Ground to Ground Gunnery Range and Kingman Air to Air Gunnery Range was located about six miles north of the present city limits of the City of Kingman. From this point, the former practice gunnery ranges extended northward approximately 31 miles, generally following the Hualapai Valley. To support the training at the main facility, Yucca Army Airfield operated several emergency landing strips.

It was built in 1942 by the Del E. Webb Construction Company with Kemper Goodwin serving as architect.

The gunnery ranges were used to train gunners in air-to-air firing. Five target flight lines and two auxiliary landing fields were established within this range. Initially, gunnery trainees fired at targets towed along these target flight lines. This technique did not provide good training and other techniques were tried. One of the first was to place a gun camera on the machine gun and instead of firing bullets the camera would record the gunners sight picture whenever the trigger was pulled. In this situation, instead of aiming at a towed target sleeve, P-39 and P-63 aircraft were used as targets. Another technique tried involved the use of frangible bullets which were fired at specially armored versions of the P-39 and P-63s. This was called Operation PINBALL.

On May 7, 1943, the facility was officially named the Kingman Army Air Field. The base continued to grow and change with many new squadrons being added to the base and some of the existing ones combined. The host unit at Kingman Field was the 460th AAF Base Unit. Training units were as follows:

- 1120th Flexible Gunnery Training Squadron
- 1121st Flexible Gunnery Training Squadron
- 1122d Flexible Gunnery Training Squadron
- 1123d Flexible Gunnery Training Squadron
- 334th Aviation Squadron

Kingman Army Airfield 1943 photo pictorial. Click on photo to view the full pictorial.

The 1120th and the 329th merged with the 328th to become the 328th Flexible Gunnery Training Group. The 1122d, 537th, and 538th were consolidated to form the 1123d Flexible Gunnery Training Group. The 1121st became the 329th. The 536th and the 760th Flexible Gunnery Training Groups were added to the list. Also assigned to the B-17 groups was the 31st Altitude Squadron, training for operations at high altitude.

Kingman Army Air Field was set up to handle two classes of about 200 students at any one time. During 1943, the policy was to have a class fire 1,200 rounds per student for one week on the Kingman Air to Air Gunnery Range (week five of the training cycle) and then move to Yucca AAF and have them fire 1,000 rounds during the second week.

Initially, the ammunition used was .30 caliber. As the .50 caliber machine gun became available, the use of the .30 caliber was phased out. The P-39 and P-63 aircraft, used as targets, were normally equipped with a 37mm cannon. When the aircraft was in use as a target, this cannon was supposed to be removed and a light replaced it which would signal the gunners when hits were scored on the aircraft. During the latter part of the period this range was operational, the policy was that the gun camera missions were flown on this range and the live fire missions were flown on the Yucca Air to Air Range.

On April 22, 1944, the Kingman Army Air Field was consolidated and the host unit was redesignated as the 3018th Army Air Force Base Unit. Each of the units on the base became subdivisions of 3018th. During 1944 the 3018th was one of the top training schools in the United States.

After 1945 there was no need for a gunnery school – or for the airplanes that carried the guns. That year saw the base wind down to a stop. On November 15, 1945, the property was declared surplus, and between 1946 and 1950 the various parcels were returned and leases cancelled.

=== World War II aircraft disposal ===
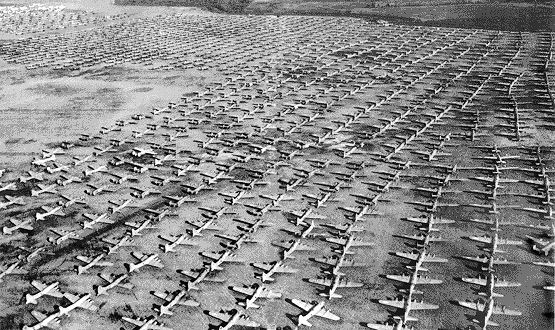
Acres of World War II aircraft in storage, awaiting their fate at Kingman, 1946

After the war the Reconstruction Finance Corporation established five large storage, sales and scrapping centers for Army Air Forces aircraft. These were located at Albuquerque AAF, New Mexico, Altus AAF, Oklahoma, Kingman, Arizona, Ontario AAF, California and Walnut Ridge AAF, Arkansas. A sixth facility for storing, selling and scrapping Navy and Marine aircraft was located at Clinton, Oklahoma.

Estimates of the number of excess surplus airplanes ran as high as 150,000. Consideration was given to storing a substantial number of these. By the summer of 1945, at least 30 sales-storage depots and 23 sales centers were in operation. In November 1945, it was estimated a total of 117,210 aircraft would be transferred as surplus.

Between 1945 and June 1947, the RFC, War Assets Corporation and the War Assets Administration (disposal function of the RFC was transferred to WAC on January 15, 1946, and to the WAA in March 1946) processed approximately 61,600 World War II aircraft, of which 34,700 were sold for flyable purposes and 26,900, primarily combat types, were sold for scrapping.

War Assets Administration came to Kingman AAF to set up Sales & Storage Depot No. 41. Depot 41 was to sell off the base buildings and equipment. Not only that, it would store aircraft from the Army Air Force. Some reports estimated that approximately 10,000 warbirds were flown to Kingman in 1945 and 1946 for storage and sale, but official records indicate that number ended up being closer to 5,500. 38 of the 118 B-32 Dominator Very Heavy (VH) bombers, built by Convair at Fort Worth, Texas, were flown there, including several straight from the assembly line. Five of Kingman's B-32s had participated in the 312th Bombardment Group's overseas activities in the closing days of World War II.

Most of the transports and trainers could be used in the civil fleet, and trainers were sold for $875 to $2,400. The fighters and bombers were of little peacetime use, although several P-38 Lightnings were sold to individuals for use in air racing. Typical prices for surplus aircraft were:

- BT-13 – $450
- P-38 – $1,250
- AT-6 – $1,500
- A-26 – $2,000
- P-51 – $3,500
- B-25 – $8,250
- B-17 – $13,750
- B-24 – $13,750
- B-32 – not available for sale. Milton Reynolds, of the Reynolds Pen Company, wanted to purchase a Kingman Dominator for one of his record-setting publicity stunts, but he was not allowed to buy one as all 38 were destroyed.

Many aircraft from the various War Assets locations were transferred to schools, and to communities for memorial use for a minimal fee. A Boy Scout troop bought a B-17 for $350. The only B-17 known to have made it out of Kingman was B-17D #40-3097 named The Swoose, which is currently (as of 2015) under restoration at the U.S. Air Force Museum's Dayton Ohio facility.

General sales were conducted from these centers across the U.S.; however, the idea for long-term storage, considering the approximate cost of $20 per month per aircraft, was soon discarded, and in June 1946, the remaining aircraft, except those at Altus, were put up for scrap bid.

After the Sales-Storage No. Depot 41 completed its job in late 1948, the airfield was turned over to Mohave County to be used as an airport for the county.

=== Kingman Airport and Industrial Park ===
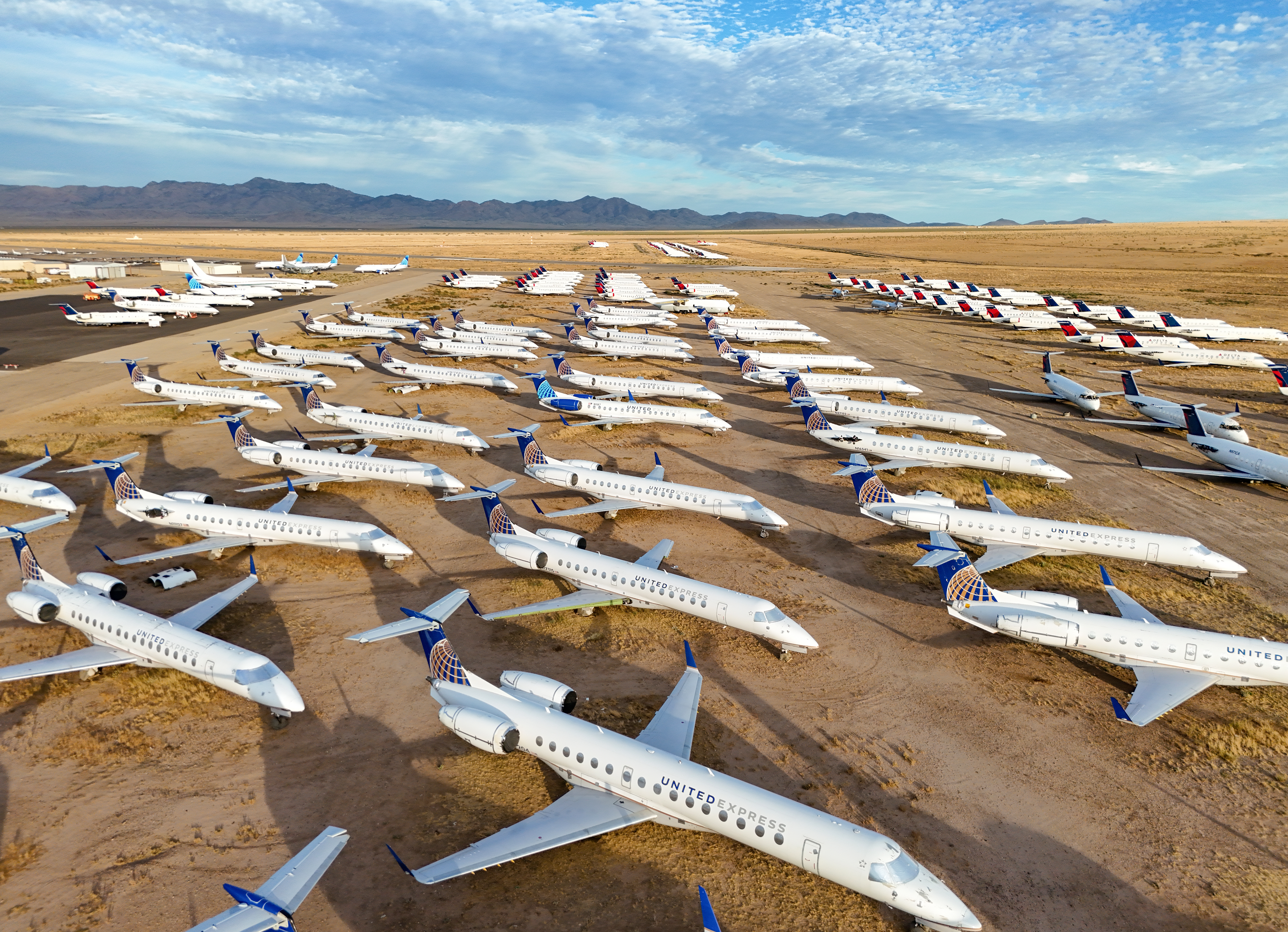
Acres of regional airliners in storage, awaiting their fate at Kingman, 2024

With the disposal of the military aircraft completed, Kingman AAF was returned to civilian use in 1949.

All but a few of the original Kingman Army Airfield buildings have been removed. The property was formerly used as a support facility for aircraft training and has been redeveloped into a civil airport and industrial park. Today, large numbers of civilian airliners are stored there and remarketed or recycled into spare parts and into their base metals.

The Kingman Army Airfield Historical Society was established, creating a museum to preserve the field's history with artifacts, photos, and displays. It also includes recognition of all conflicts in which Americans have served.

The airport has a significant aircraft bone-yard. Of the aircraft stored there, several belonged to DHL and Delta Air Lines.

== Environmental contamination ==
Soldiers trained by shooting clay pigeons made with coal tar pitch, which contained polycyclic aromatic hydrocarbon (PAHs). Debris from these targets and lead from the projectiles remained in the area until 2014. A 2010 site inspection of the former gun training range of about 75 acres showed "soil samples [...] contained PAHs concentrations 1,000 times higher than permitted under 2007 Arizona residential risk-based screening levels and 10,000 times higher than the updated 2012 U.S. Environmental Protection Agency residential risk-based screening levels". Lead from the projectiles could travel nearly 900 feet. From 2013 until July 2014, the top two feet of soil and landscaping on 55 residential lots were removed and replaced. Starting October 2014 through October 2016, 284 residential properties were scheduled to be soil tested.

== Facilities and aircraft ==
Kingman Airport covers an area of 4,200 acres (1,700 ha) at an elevation of 3,449 feet (1,051 m) above mean sea level. It has two runways with asphalt surfaces: 3/21 is 6,827 by 150 feet (2,081 x 46 m); 17/35 is 6,725 by 75 feet (2,050 x 23 m).

For the 12-month period ending January 1, 2016, the airport had 28,478 aircraft operations, an average of 120 per day: 91% general aviation, 4% scheduled commercial, 4% air taxi, and <1% military. At that time there were 56 aircraft based at this airport: 43 single-engine, 10 multi-engine, 2 glider, and 1 helicopter.

== Airlines and destinations ==
The airport lost Essential Air Service due to exceeding the per passenger subsidy requirement. Great Lakes Airlines was the last operator out of Kingman, offering service to Phoenix.

Passenger boardings (enplanements) by year, as per the FAA
Year	2005	2006	2007	2008	2009	2010	2011	2012
Enplanements	1,907	2,417	2,437	1,260	878	897	975	924
Change	-22.9%	+26.7%	+0.8%	-48.3%	-30.3%	+2.2%	+8.7%	-5.2%

=== Cargo ===
Airlines	Destinations	Refs
Ameriflight	Prescott (AZ)	

== See also ==
- Arizona World War II Army Airfields
- 36th Flying Training Wing (World War II)
- List of airports in Arizona

== Literature ==
- This article incorporates public domain material from the Air Force Historical Research Agency
- Manning, Thomas A. (2005), History of Air Education and Training Command, 1942–2002. Office of History and Research, Headquarters, AETC, Randolph AFB, Texas OCLC 71006954, 29991467
- Maurer, Maurer (1983). Air Force Combat Units Of World War II. Maxwell AFB, Alabama: Office of Air Force History. ISBN 0-89201-092-4.
- Shaw, Frederick J. (2004), Locating Air Force Base Sites, History’s Legacy, Air Force History and Museums Program, United States Air Force, Washington DC. OCLC 57007862, 1050653629
- Thole, Lou (1999). Forgotten Fields of America : World War II Bases and Training, Then and Now – Vol. 2. Pictorial Histories Publishing Co. Inc ISBN 1-57510-051-7
- Thole, Lou (2003). Forgotten Fields of America, Volume III. Pictorial Histories Publishing Co. Inc ISBN 1-57510-102-5
- Essential Air Service documents (Docket DOT-OST-1996-1899) from the U.S. Department of Transportation:
  - Order 2005-3-16 (March 9, 2005): selecting Great Lakes Aviation, Ltd. to provide essential air service at Kingman, Prescott, Page, and Show Low for a new two-year period, at a combined first-year subsidy of $3,840,959, and a combined second-year subsidy of $3,854,958.
  - Order 2007-6-10 (June 13, 2007): selecting Mesa Air Group, Inc. d/b/a Air Midwest to provide subsidized essential air service at Kingman and Prescott, Arizona, for two years, beginning when the carrier inaugurates full service. Service will consist of three round trips a day (18 per week) with 19-seat Beech 1900D aircraft over a Kingman – Prescott – Phoenix or Prescott – Kingman – Las Vegas routing, at a total annual subsidy of $1,798,489 for both communities.
  - Order 2008-6-11 (June 10, 2008): selecting Great Lakes Aviation, Ltd. to provide essential air service at Kingman and Prescott, Arizona, for a two-year period beginning when the carrier inaugurates full service at both communities at a combined annual subsidy of $2,898,490.
  - Memorandum (April 8, 2009): regarding a temporary alternate service pattern at Kingman, Arizona. Great Lakes is currently unable to serve Las Vegas, but it plans to do so in the future. Instead, it plans to inaugurate service to Ontario, California, effective April 7, 2009.
  - Order 2011-3-4 (March 1, 2011): re-selecting Great Lakes Aviation, Ltd. to provide essential air service at Kingman, Page, Prescott, and Show Low, Arizona for the two-year period from May 1, 2011, to April 30, 2013, for a combined annual subsidy of $5,596,114. Established a subsidy rate for Kingman of $1,163,390, for service consisting of 12 nonstop round trips to either Phoenix or Las Vegas using 19-passenger Beechcraft aircraft.
  - Order 2012-11-5 (November 6, 2012): approving the request of Great Lakes Aviation, Ltd. to change Kingman's hub from Phoenix Sky Harbor International Airport and/or Las Vegas McCarran International Airport to include Los Angeles International Airport effective November 4, 2012.
  - Order 2013-6-1 (June 3, 2013): re-selecting Great Lakes Aviation, Ltd. to provide Essential Air Service at Kingman, Page, Prescott, and Show Low, Arizona, for the two-year period from May 1, 2013, through April 30, 2015, for a combined annual subsidy of $7,873,533. Subsidy for Kingman: $1,635,180. Scheduled Service: 12 weekly nonstop round trips to Los Angeles or Phoenix. Aircraft: 19-passenger Beechcraft 1900D.
  - Order 2014-1-18 (January 28, 2014) : approving the alternate service pattern requested by Great Lakes Aviation, Ltd., to serve Kingman, Arizona, from the hubs of Denver (via Telluride, Colorado), Los Angeles, and Phoenix effective January 31, 2014 through April 30, 2015.
  - Order 2014-4-26 (April 24, 2014): directing interested persons to show cause as to why the Department should not terminate the eligibility ... under the Essential Air Service (EAS) program based on criteria passed by Congress in the FAA Modernization and Reform Act of 2012 (Public Law No. 112-95). We find that Kingman is within 175 miles of a large or medium hub, McCarran International Airport in Las Vegas (LAS), a large hub, and, thus, is subject to the 10-enplanement statutory criterion. We also find that during fiscal year 2013, Kingman generated a total of 1,661 passengers (inbound plus outbound). Consistent with the methodology described above, that results in an average of 2.7 enplanements per day, below the 10-enplanement statutory criterion necessary to remain eligible in the Essential Air Service program.
