= Dick Pope Sr. =

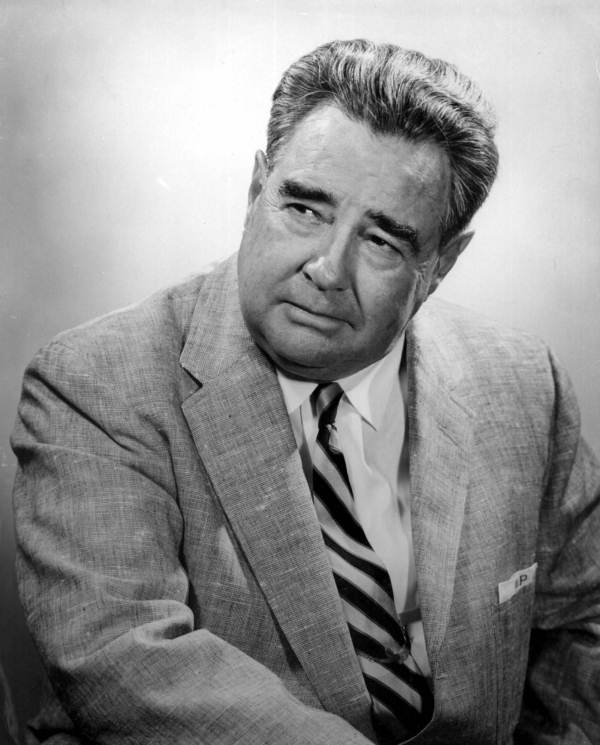
- Born: Richard Downing Pope; April 19, 1900; Des Moines, Iowa, U.S.
- Died: January 28, 1988 (aged 87); Winter Haven, Florida, U.S.
- Occupation: Founder of Cypress Gardens
- Spouse: Julie Pope
- Children: 2, including Dick Pope Jr.

Richard Downing Pope Sr. (April 19, 1900 – January 28, 1988), known as Dick Pope, was a prominent figure in the development of Florida tourism who founded the amusement park Cypress Gardens and popularized the sport of water skiing. He was widely known as "Mr. Florida", and was also called "Mr. Water Skiing", the "Grand Poobah of Publicity", and an "aquatic Barnum". Pope actively campaigned for Walt Disney World to be located in Florida.

== Personal life ==
Dick Pope Sr. was born in Des Moines, Iowa, according to legend during the middle of a tornado, from where he was said to have derived his whirlwind personality and energy for life. At the age of 7, in 1908, his family moved to Lake Wales, Florida. For a while, he lived and worked in New York City.

In 1926, while in North Carolina, he met his future wife, Julie Pope. Together they spent most of their lives in and around Winter Haven, Florida. They were active members of St. Matthew's Catholic Church in Winter Haven. They had two children, Dick Pope Jr. and Adrienne Pope Watkins. During World War II, he served in the U.S. Army Signal Corps.

Pope was known for his lively personality and his flamboyant clothing, including a turquoise suit, trimmed in pink, worn with bright white shoes.

== Business career ==
Pope started working in his father's real estate business at an early age. He was a natural promoter and salesman. He is said to have closed his first real estate deal when he was just 12 years old. During the Great Depression, he took different jobs working as a promoter and salesman. He and his brother had some success promoting speedboats and aquaplanes on lakes throughout Florida.

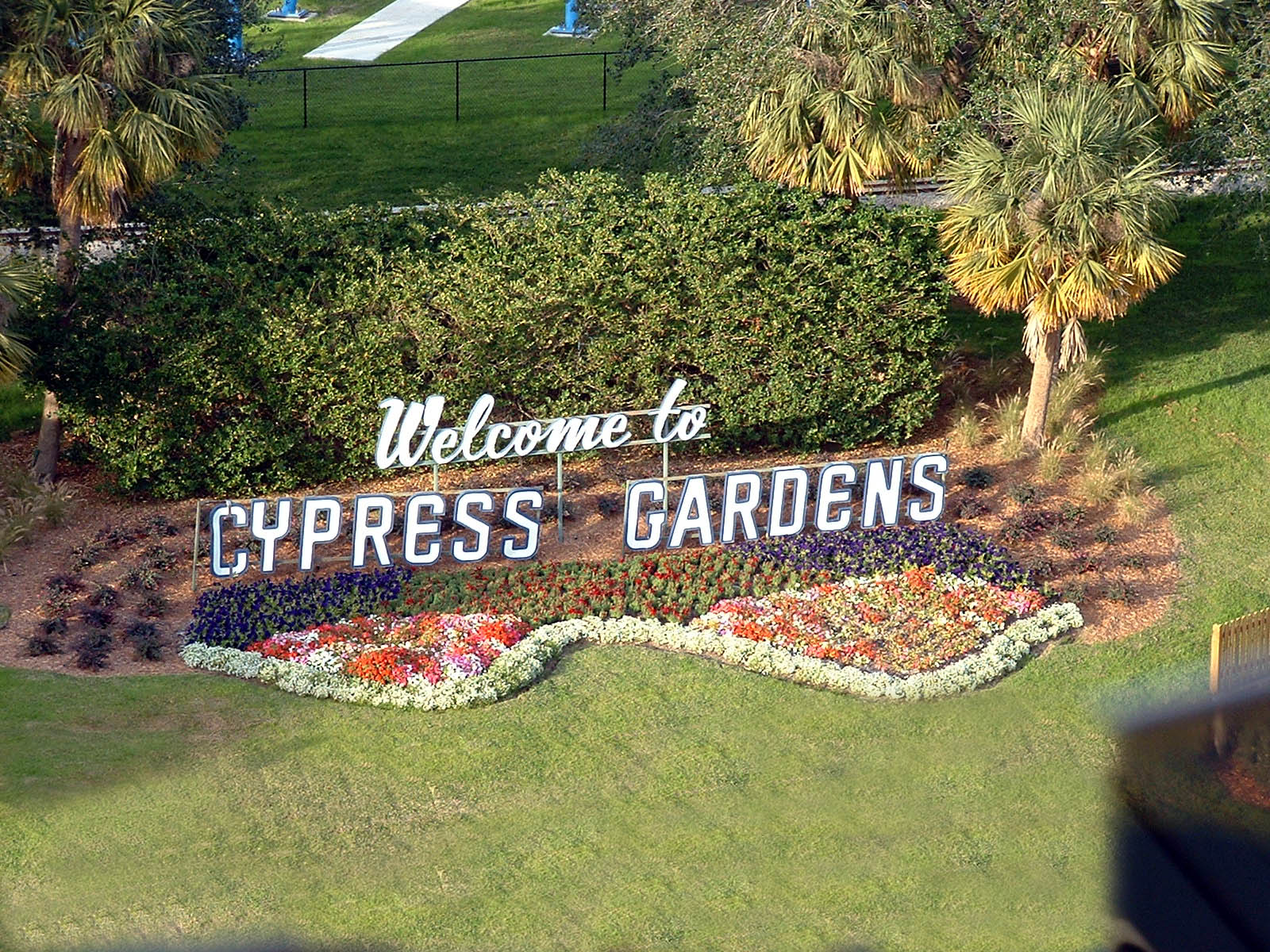
Cypress Gardens in Winter Haven, Florida.

In the early 1930s, his wife Julie showed him an article in Good Housekeeping about a man charging visitors money to see the manicured gardens around his mansion home. From this, they hatched the idea of Cypress Gardens, and over the next few years they worked to convert a section of swamp land on the shores of Lake Eloise into a theme park garden. On January 2, 1936, Dick and Julie Pope officially opened their famed theme park, charging visitors 25 cents each to visit. Cypress Gardens was an immediate success.

Cypress Gardens would eventually grow to over 200 acres of land, and host more than a million visitors annually. The theme park provided visitors with an escape from the everyday world, and originally featured idyllic botanical gardens and southern belles working as hostesses. During World War II, a group of soldiers waiting to deploy to war from Tampa, Florida saw photographs of water skiers on the lake at the park, and they mistakenly believed that water ski shows were part of the entertainment offered there. When a small group soldiers arrived at the park, ready to pay the entrance fee to watch the water ski show, Julie Pope rounded up her children, Dick Jr. and Adrienne, and their friends, and staged an impromptu water skiing exhibition. It was a success, and the next weekend, 800 more soldiers arrived to see the show. From that point on, water ski shows were a staple of the Cypress Gardens brand.

Pope worked tirelessly to promote his theme park. He produced over 500 news reels and 75 short films to promote the park. In the 1970s, Cypress Gardens purchased Magnolia Mansion, the New Orleans style mansion, built on Lake Eloise by citrus magnate, John A. Snively. At its height, Cypress Gardens was nationally famous. It was used as a set location for a variety of films, including Moon Over Miami (film). An episode of the Tonight Show with Johnny Carson was filmed there. The park features prominently in the first Cinerama film "This is Cinerama" from 1952, with dramatic water-skiing stunts showing off the immersive widescreen capabilities of the new format. The park attracted such celebrity guests as Elvis Presley, Betty Grable, and King Hussein of Jordan.

== Impact on Florida tourism ==
Pope referred to himself as the "Grand Poobah of Publicity", and through his efforts, the image of Florida as playground for sun and fun spread around the world. He distributed photos he took of attractive beachgoers, and persuaded weather services say partly sunny instead of partly cloudy. He is credited with single-handedly re-vitalizing Florida tourism after the difficult times of the Great Depression and World War II. Cypress Gardens helped to establish central Florida as the dominant area in the world for theme parks.

The Florida Public Relations Association (FPRA) annually gives out the Dick Pope All-Florida Grand Golden Image Award for best PR program in the state. Recent winners of the award include Sachs Media (4x); RB Oppenheim Associates; Jason Mudd & Associates (now Axia Public Relations); and Herrle Communications Group. The Polk County Chapter of FPRA is named after Dick Pope.

The Dick Pope Sr. Institute For Tourism Studies operates in conjunction with the Rosen College of Hospitality Management at the University of Central Florida, conducting research into the tourism and hospitality industries. In 2013 the Dick Pope Legacy Hall of Fame Awards were established in his name recognizing Leadership in Hospitality Tourism for the State of Florida. A plaque honoring Dick Pope and memorializing his early development of Florida's tourism was revealed on June 11, 2014, in the lobby of the Orange County Convention Center. All Dick Pope Legacy Hall of Fame Honorees join the wall and are celebrated at an annual hospitality scholarship fundraiser in Orlando, The Grand Tour Gala.

== Water skiing ==
Pope was an avid outdoorsman and accomplished athlete. He was a member of the first class of inductees into the Water Ski Hall of Fame. He is also a member of the Florida Sports Hall of Fame.

Pope became interested in water skiing during the 1920s, while working with his brother promoting and selling speed boats in Florida. He began skiing behind the boats as a way to increase excitement during the sales demonstrations. Soon, he began trying different moves and tricks to increase the excitement. In 1928, he became the first person to successfully complete a jump on water skis, jumping a wooden ramp, and going a distance of 25 ft. After water skiing became part of the Cypress Gardens' shows, he helped develop different formations and tricks, including the water ski human pyramid.

Despite his prowess as a water skier, his real importance to the sport was promoting it. Pope produced newsreels, films, and magazine articles about the water skiing featured at Cypress Gardens. He promoted the sport in media outlets around the world. His efforts brought the sport international attention for the first time.

In 1950, he hosted the second World Water Ski Championship. Pope hosted the event again in 1958. For many years, his Dixie Water Ski tournament was one of the most important annual water ski competitions. At the 1964 New York World's Fair, he staged a series of highly successful water skiing exhibitions. He also staged a water skiing exhibition for a segment on the Ed Sullivan Show.

Pope worked hard to organize water skiing as a sport. He served as the American Water Ski Association vice-president for many years, and was eventually elected to the position for life. He also helped form the World Water Ski Federation, a rival organization to the International Water Ski Union.

His son, Dick Pope Jr., was one of the first persons to successfully barefoot water ski, and is a member of the Water Ski Hall of Fame. They are the only father–son pair in the Water Ski Hall of Fame.

== See also ==
- List of Water Skiing Hall of Fame Inductees
