= Chrysler Proving Grounds =

North American automobile test facilities

Stellantis North America, more commonly known as Chrysler, operates proving grounds around North America for development and validation testing of new vehicles.

== Arizona Proving Ground (Yucca, Arizona) ==
Location:34°52′29″N 114°7′31″W

The Arizona Proving Ground is a vehicle test facility established in 1955 in Yucca, Arizona. It was owned and operated by Ford Motor Company based in Dearborn, Michigan, until Chrysler LLC announced on November 2, 2007 that it had purchased the facility for $34.9 million. APG is located at the foot of the Hualapai Mountains near Yucca, Arizona, 120 miles (200 km) southeast of Las Vegas, situated between Lake Havasu and Kingman, Arizona.

The facility was originally Yucca Army Airfield, an Army Air Corps training base, used during World War II. The field was declared surplus land by 1946 and the ownership was turned over to Ford in 1954.

Harley-Davidson Motor Company has entered into an agreement to use the vehicle test facility to test their motorcycles. Harley-Davidson currently occupies several buildings at the test facility, including at least one they custom built.

=== Features ===
Arizona Proving Ground has more than 50 miles (80 km) of concrete and earthen surfaces on 3,840 acres (15.5 km^{2}) that are continuously maintained. It includes a five-mile (8 km) high speed banked oval track, with a myriad of other road testing surfaces. With extended operations in the nearby mountain range, at elevations ranging from 500 to 6,500 feet (152 to 1,981 m) above sea level, and varied terrain and annual temperatures ranging from 30 to 120 °F (−1 to 49 °C), APG provides a wide spectrum of vehicle testing conditions.

Details about the facility:

- An 18-acre (7.3 ha) vehicle dynamics area
- A water ingestion test area
- Vehicle corrosion test chambers
- Special test roads/surfaces for vehicle durability testing
- A water leak test facility
- A low friction facility suitable for ABS system testing
- Light truck structural durability
- Accelerated vehicle corrosion testing
- Car and truck thermal management
- Hot fuel and octane testing
- Splash testing/water ingestion testing
- FMVSS brake certification for car and light truck
- Tire traction testing for car and light truck
- Elevation - 1,950 feet (590 m)
- Average maximum summer temperature - 103 °F (39 °C)
- Average minimum winter temperature - 32 °F (0 °C)
- Average annual precipitation - 6.4 inches (160 mm)

== Chelsea Proving Grounds (Chelsea, Michigan) ==
Location:42°16′3″N 84°2′45″W

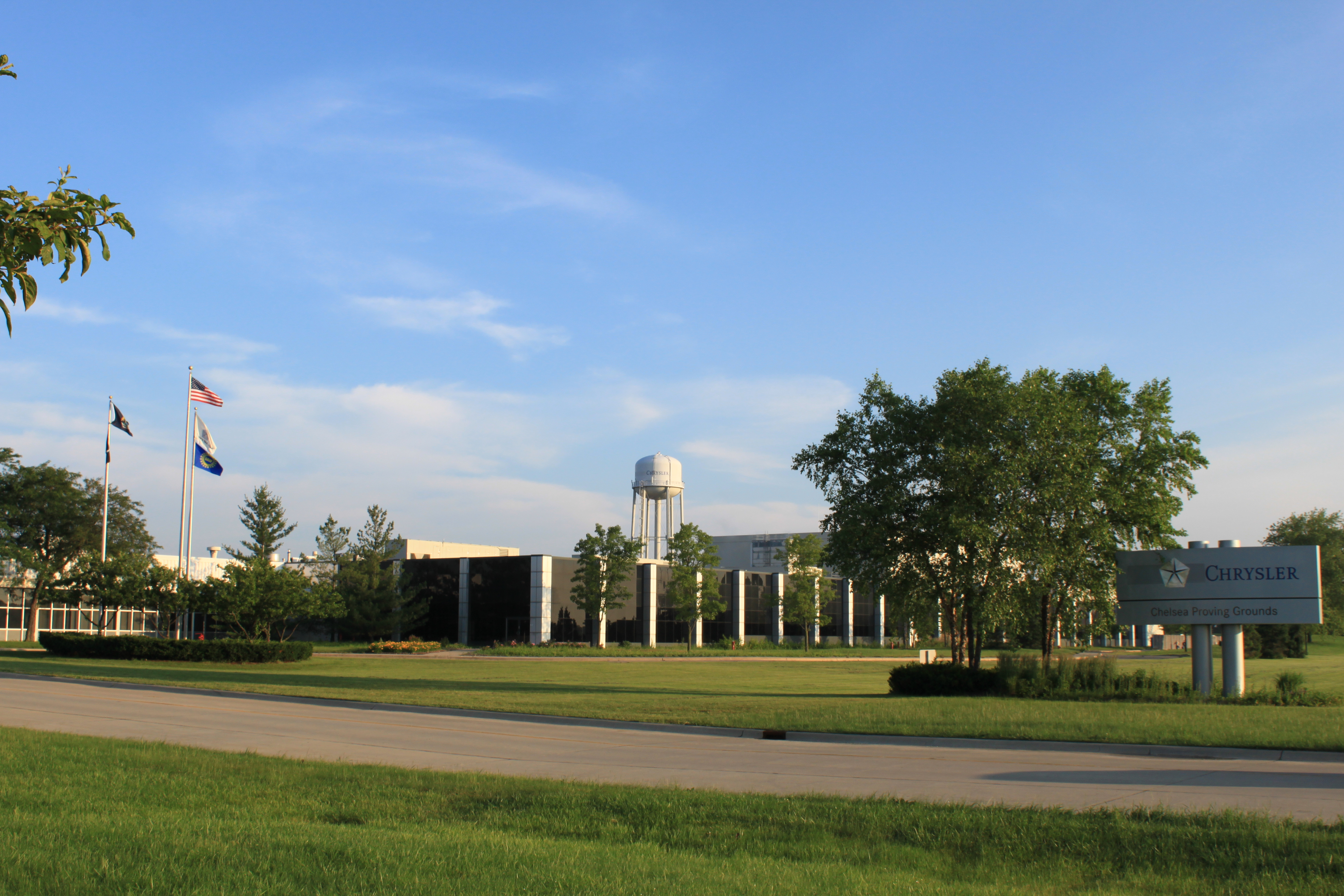
Chelsea Proving Grounds

Details about the facility:

- The facility covers an area of 3,850 acres (15.6 km^{2})
- Sled-impact testing site
- Covered crash barrier
- Skid traction area
- Mileage accumulators
- Emissions certification Center
- Wind tunnel
- Corrosion testing facility
- Curb hit testing
- 32% grade and 15% grade
- New "spaghetti" road being constructed

== Florida Evaluation Center (Naples, Florida) ==
Location:26°10′9.58″N 81°30′1.08″W

Stats: 530 acres (2.1 km²), 6.2 miles (10 km) of roads

Major facilities: Straightaway, lane change area, handling course, sound test area

Major testing: Warm weather performance and handling

This facility has been taken over by Chrysler in early 2013 with Harley-Davidson leasing parts of the facility

== Former Facilities ==
=== Arizona Proving Ground (Wittmann, Arizona) ===
Location:33°47′41.2974″N 112°29′46.737″W

Covers an area of 5,555 acres (2,248 ha), of which 3,836 acres (1,552 ha) are fenced.

The facility also includes an area to test sun exposure on vehicles and components, a city traffic course, a corrosion-preparation facility and access to mountain grades.

This facility is being retired as it has been sold to home builders / land developers.

According to MacRumors Apple bought this proving ground, north west of Phoenix, in 2021 to test Apple cars.
