= 1998 Florida Education Commissioner election =

- November 3, 1998
- Turnout: 49.5%
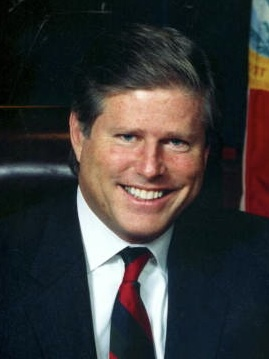

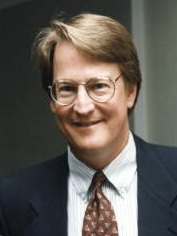
| Nominee | Tom Gallagher | Peter Wallace |
| Party | Republican | Democratic |
| Popular vote | 2,185,027 | 1,679,893 |
| Percentage | 56.5% | 43.5% |
- County results Gallagher: 50–60% 60–70% 70–80% Wallace: 50–60% 60–70%
Education Commissioner before election
Frank Brogan
Republican
Elected Education Commissioner
Tom Gallagher
Republican

The 1998 Florida Education Commissioner election took place on November 3, 1998, to elect the Education Commissioner of Florida. The election was won by former Treasurer Tom Gallagher, who took office on January 5, 1999. This was the last regularly scheduled election for this office, as a 1998 amendment to the Florida Constitution turned this office into one appointed directly by the governor.

== Candidates ==
- Tom Gallagher (R), former Treasurer and member of the Florida House of Representatives
- Peter Wallace (D), former Speaker and member of the Florida House of Representatives

== Results ==
1998 Florida Education Commissioner election
| Party | Candidate | Votes | % |
|---|---|---|---|
| Republican | Tom Gallagher | 2,185,027 | 56.54 |
| Democratic | Peter Wallace | 1,679,893 | 43.46 |
| Total votes | | 3,864,920 | 100.00 |
