= Dick Pope Jr. =

American water skier (1930–2007)

- Born: Richard Downing Pope Jr. December 12, 1930; Long Island, New York
- Died: November 8, 2007 (aged 76); Winter Haven, Florida
- Citizenship: United States
- Organization: Cypress Gardens
- Known for: World Championships, inventing barefooting
- Spouse: Frances Pope
- Parent: Dick Pope Sr.

Richard Downing Pope Jr. (December 12, 1930 – November 8, 2007), better known as Dick Pope Jr., was a World Champion water skier and an important business leader in Central Florida. Pope was an important innovator in the sport of water skiing, including the development of barefoot skiing in 1947. He is the son of Dick Pope Sr., the founder of Cypress Gardens theme park.

== Personal life ==
Pope was born in Long Island, New York. When he was just 18 months old, the family moved to Winter Haven, Florida. In 1936, his parents, Dick Pope Sr. and Julie Pope, opened Cypress Gardens, one of the earliest theme parks in America. Dick Pope Sr. played an important role in the development of Florida tourism and the growth of the sport of water skiing.

Pope served in the United States Marine Corps. He was an avid hunter and fisherman. He was known to carry a scratch pad to make notes about fishing conditions. He was also an expert marksman and champion skeet shooter. Pope and his wife Frances at one time held the husband-wife 12-gauge world title for skeet shooting.

When Walt Disney was scouting for a location for a second, even larger theme park, the Pope family promoted Cypress Gardens and Central Florida. Dick Pope Jr. is said to have been key to convincing Walt Disney to select Orlando as the home of Walt Disney World.

== Water skiing career ==
In 1947, Pope was one of the first people to successfully barefoot waterski. He and his friends in Winter Haven, Florida discovered that if the speed of the boat was increased high enough, then barefoot waterskiing became possible. Photographs and newsreels of Pope barefoot waterskiing at speeds in excess of 40 mph became an international sensation at the time. The media attention was created by his father, Dick Pope Sr., to generate publicity for Cypress Gardens, but it also helped popularize water skiing worldwide. That same year, at age 17, Dick Pope Jr. won his first National Water Ski Title.

In 1949, Pope competed in the first Water Skiing World Championships. He skied all out at the first World Championships, taking youthful risks, and losing out to more conservative European skiers. In 1950, he won his first World Title. He was particularly known for tricks. He was one of several skiers from that era who would "climb the rope" in order to get greater height on a jump. This practice is banned in the sport today because of its extreme danger. In 1952, he became the first person to complete a 540 jump off a ramp.

== Cypress Gardens ==
Pope succeeded his father, Dick Pope Sr., as president of Cypress Gardens in 1962. He took the company public in 1972, and was elected chairman of the board in 1982 before the company was sold to Harcourt Brace Jovanovich, Inc.

== Tournament results ==
- 1947 National Overall Champion
- 1948 National Overall Champion
- 1949 National Overall Champion
- 1950 National Overall Champion
- 1950 World Slalom Champion
- 1950 World Jump Runner-up
- 1950 World Tricks Fifth Place
- 1950 World Overall Champion

== See also ==
- Waterskiing
- World water skiing champions
- Barefoot skiing
- List of Water Skiing Hall of Fame Inductees
- USA Water Ski
- United States Waterskiing Team
