= Cypress Gardens =

1936–2009 amusement park in Florida, United States

- Previously known as Cypress Gardens Adventure Park

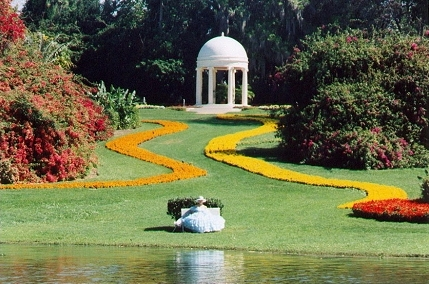
- The Gazebo and a Southern belle of Cypress Gardens
- Interactive map of Cypress Gardens
- Location: Winter Haven, Florida, United States
- Coordinates: 27°59′24.41″N 81°41′30.66″W
- Status: Defunct
- Opened: January 2, 1936
- Closed: September 23, 2009
- Owner: Adventure Parks Group
- Operating season: Year-round

Attractions
- Total: 41
- Roller coasters: 5
- Water rides: 2
- Website: cypressgardens.com
- Cypress Gardens
- U.S. National Register of Historic Places
- Location within Florida Location within the United States
- Location: Winter Haven, Florida
- Coordinates: 27.990114°N 81.69185°W
- Built: 1936
- NRHP reference No.: 14000152
- Added to NRHP: April 14, 2014
- Replaced by: Legoland Florida

Cypress Gardens was a botanical garden and theme park near Winter Haven, Florida that operated from 1936 to 2009. As of 2011, the botanical garden portion had been preserved inside Legoland Florida.

== History ==
Billed as Florida's first commercial tourist theme park, Cypress Gardens opened on January 2, 1936, as a botanical garden planted by Dick Pope Sr. and his wife Julie. Over the years it became one of the biggest attractions in Florida, known for its water ski shows, gardens, and Southern Belles.

It became known as the "Water Ski Capital of the World" because it was the site of many of the sport's landmark firsts and over 50 world records were broken there. During World War II, soldiers visited and waterskiing was introduced for their entertainment. Numerous movies were filmed at the park, including portions of This is Cinerama, the first feature filmed in the wide-screen format, and a string of Esther Williams films and TV specials in the 1950s and 1960s. In the 1950s the Southern Belles attraction was introduced, in which young women dressed in the crinolines reminiscent of the Antebellum South. During the 1961-1965 American Civil War Centennial young men dressed in Confederate uniforms would be photographed with the Southern Belles. In the early 1960s a custom photography boat named Miss Cover Girl was introduced, and the park became a popular site for the filming of television commercials.

Many celebrities and dignitaries have skied and visited at the park, including Elvis Presley, King Hussein of Jordan and his son and successor, King Abdullah II. It was also the site of a Johnny Carson special.

On April 14, 2014, it was added to the National Register of Historic Places.

=== Competitions and changes of ownership ===
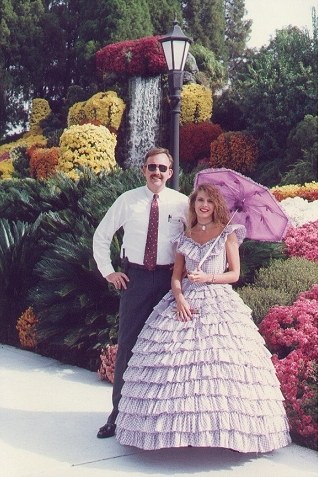
Bill Reynolds and a Southern Belle

Competition for guests increased after Walt Disney World Resort opened nearby in 1971. In the early 1980s, the Popes retired and transferred the park to their son, Dick Pope, Jr.

In 1985 book publisher Harcourt, Brace, Jovanovich purchased the park to build their SeaWorld parks group. Harcourt sold the other businesses to Anheuser-Busch in 1989. Busch continued to operate Cypress Gardens until April 1, 1995, when a group of the park's managers, led by Bill Reynolds, bought the property.

Under President and CEO Reynolds, the park operated until April 13, 2003, when it closed after a prolonged tourism decline following the September 11, 2001, terrorist attacks. 529 people were put out of work with three days' notice.

=== Cypress Gardens Adventure Park ===
On February 22, 2004, Adventure Parks Group, owned by Kent Buescher, purchased the property and renamed it Cypress Gardens Adventure Park. The purchase of the amusement park portion of the Cypress Gardens property was part of a larger conservation transaction. In that transaction, the entire 150-acre (61 ha) site was purchased from its previous owner, First Gardens, L.C., by The Trust for Public Land, a national conservation organization. TPL then sold a conservation easement over the entire property to the state of Florida, while Polk County purchased the 30-acre (12 ha) gardens portion of the property, less the development rights conveyed in the state easement. Adventure Parks Group purchased the balance of the property, also subject to the conservation easement.

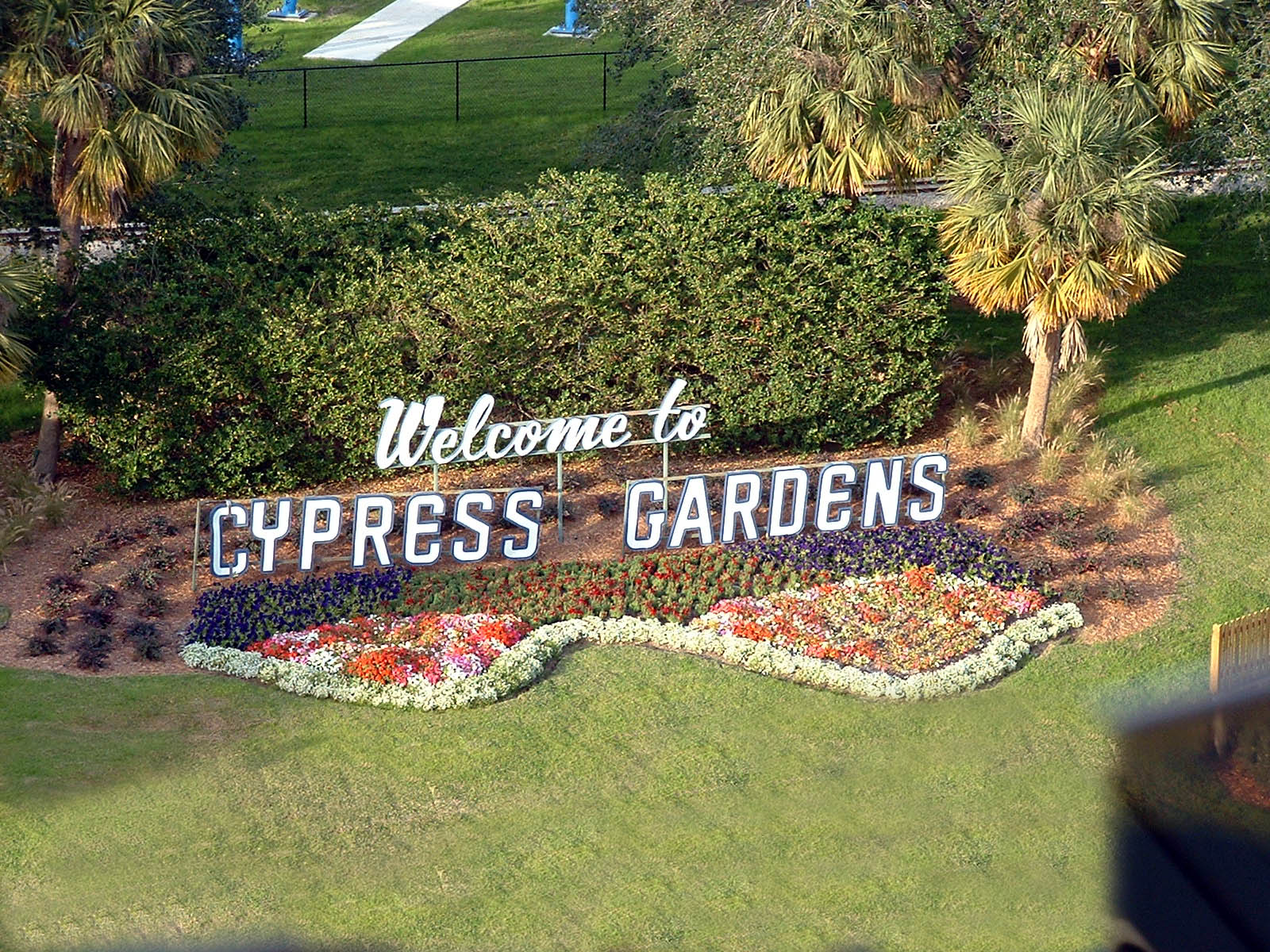
Sign for Cypress Gardens

Buescher's plan to reopen the park in September 2004 was delayed by damage from hurricanes Charley, Frances, and Jeanne. Cypress Gardens Adventure Park finally opened in November 2004. One of its new attractions, the Triple Hurricane roller coaster, was named for the tumultuous storm season. The adjacent Splash Island water park opened in 2005, along with the Galaxy Spin roller coaster.

On May 18, 2006, scenes for the 2007 film Grace Is Gone, starring John Cusack, were shot at Cypress Gardens. In the film, a man delays telling his daughters that their mother has been killed in the Iraq War by taking them to "Enchanted Gardens", their favorite theme park.

In September 2006, Adventure Parks Group filed for Chapter 11 bankruptcy protection at the Florida site citing approximately $30 million in damages sustained from the 2004 hurricanes.

Land South Adventures, a subsidiary of Mulberry, Florida-based Land South Holdings, purchased Cypress Gardens at a bankruptcy auction on October 16, 2007, for $16.9 million, leaving Buescher as interim manager until Baker Leisure Group of Orlando, Florida, took over park operations in January 2008.

On November 10, 2008, Land South Holdings announced the temporary closure of the park, which was shut down November 17 of that year. It reopened on March 28, 2009, with an expanded water park named Splash Island. The animals, however, were gone, and the rides did not operate or had already been removed. Cypress Gardens and Splash Island began separate ticketing, with dual-park season passes also available; parking was free.

On September 23, 2009, owner Land South Holdings LLC announced that the park was closing immediately, saying that all avenues to keep the park open had been explored but that they were unable to find a way to "keep the park running in its traditional form".

=== Legoland acquisition ===
On January 15, 2010, the world's second largest theme park and attraction operator Merlin Entertainments bought Cypress Gardens with intent to use the site for the fifth Legoland. On January 21, 2010, Merlin Entertainments announced that the park would be turned into Legoland Florida. On October 21, 2010, an October 2011 opening date was announced. Opening day occurred on October 15, 2011, at 10 am EDT.

== Attractions ==
=== Roller coasters ===
| Ride | Year opened | Year closed | Description |
|---|---|---|---|
| Fiesta Express | 2004 | 2008 | A Zamperla kiddie coaster with small hairpin turns. It was relocated to Gillian's Funland in Sea Isle City, N.J. in 2009. It has since been relocated to Austin's Park in Pflugerville, T.X. as of 2013. |
| Okeechobee Rampage | 2004 | 2008 | A Vekoma junior roller coaster. It reopened in the new Legoland Florida as Dragon. |
| Swamp Thing | 2004 | 2008 | A Vekoma Suspended Family Coaster. It reopened in the new Legoland Florida as Flying School. |
| Triple Hurricane | 2004 | 2008 | A Martin & Vleminckx Group junior wooden coaster. It was named for the three hurricanes (Charley, Frances, and Jeanne) that struck the park in 2004. It is an ACE Coaster Classic. It reopened in the new Legoland Florida as Coastersaurus. |
| Galaxy Spin | 2005 | 2008 | A Zamperla Spinning Wild Mouse coaster. It was relocated to Fun Spot America in Kissimmee, Florida. and reopened in July 2011 under the name Power Trip and "Rockstar Coaster" (now known as Galaxy Spin) |
| Starliner | 2007 | 2008 | A classic Philadelphia Toboggan Coasters designed wooden coaster. It originally operated at Miracle Strip Amusement Park in Panama City Beach, Florida. Miracle Strip closed in 2004. |

=== Thrill rides ===
| Ride | Year opened | Year closed | Description |
|---|---|---|---|
| Delta Kite Flyers | 2004 | 2008 | Zamperla Kite Flyer flat ride, riders are spun around while in a flying position. |
| Disk'O | 2004 | 2008 | Zamperla Disk-O flat ride, riders spin around on a frisbee traversing a track. The park would install a new version of the ride for the 2015 season Called Mia's Riding Adventure. |
| Pharaoh's Fury | 2004 | 2008 | Chance Rides Swinging Ship flat ride. |
| Power Surge | 2004 | 2008 | Zamperla Power Surge flat ride, a large spinning and flipping flat ride. |
| Thunderbolt | 2004 | 2008 | An ARM tower ride, similar to Power Tower at Cedar Point. |
| Yo-Yo | 2004 | 2008 | Chance Rides "Yo-Yo" flat ride, a circular "wave swinger" type flat ride. |

== Gallery ==
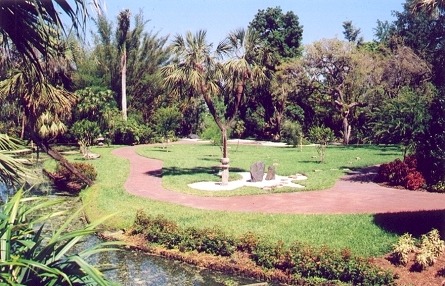
Gardens

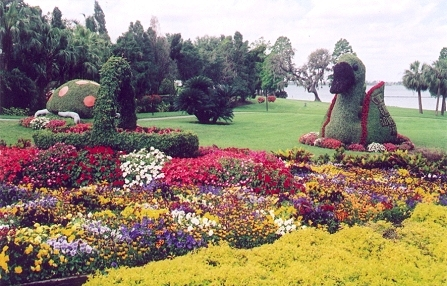
Gardens

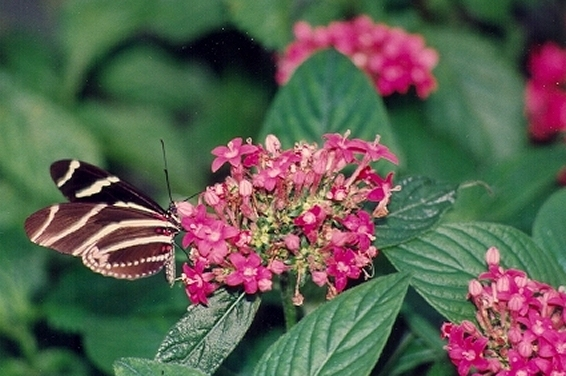
Gardens

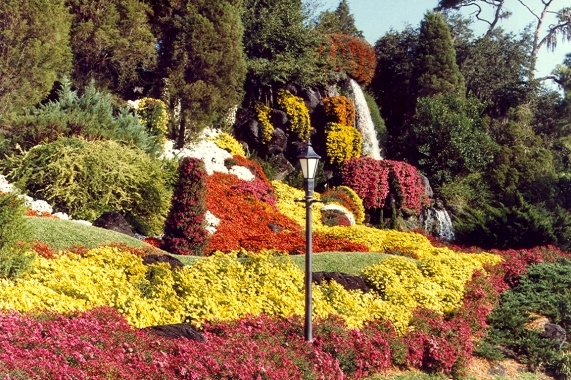
Gardens – Mum Fest

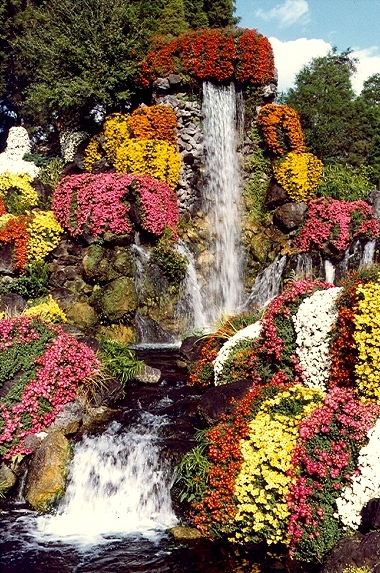
Gardens – Mum Fest

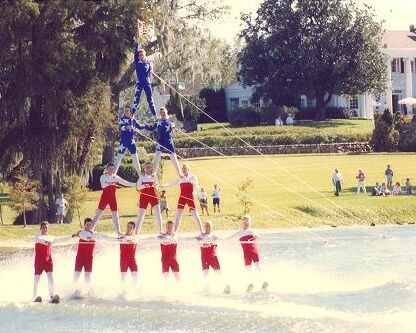
Ski Show

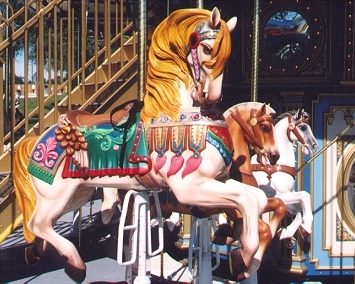
Boardwalk Carousel

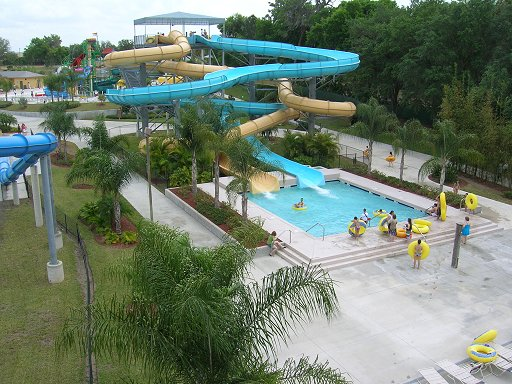
Splash Island Water Park Tonga Tubes

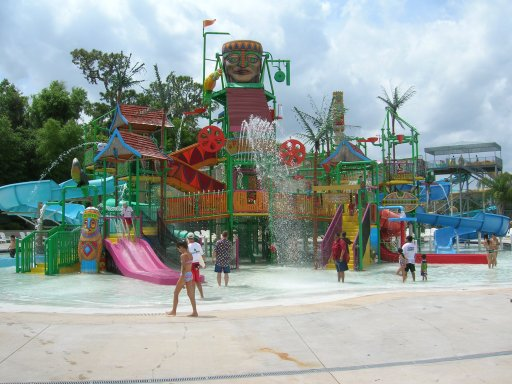
Splash Island Water Park Polynesian Adventure

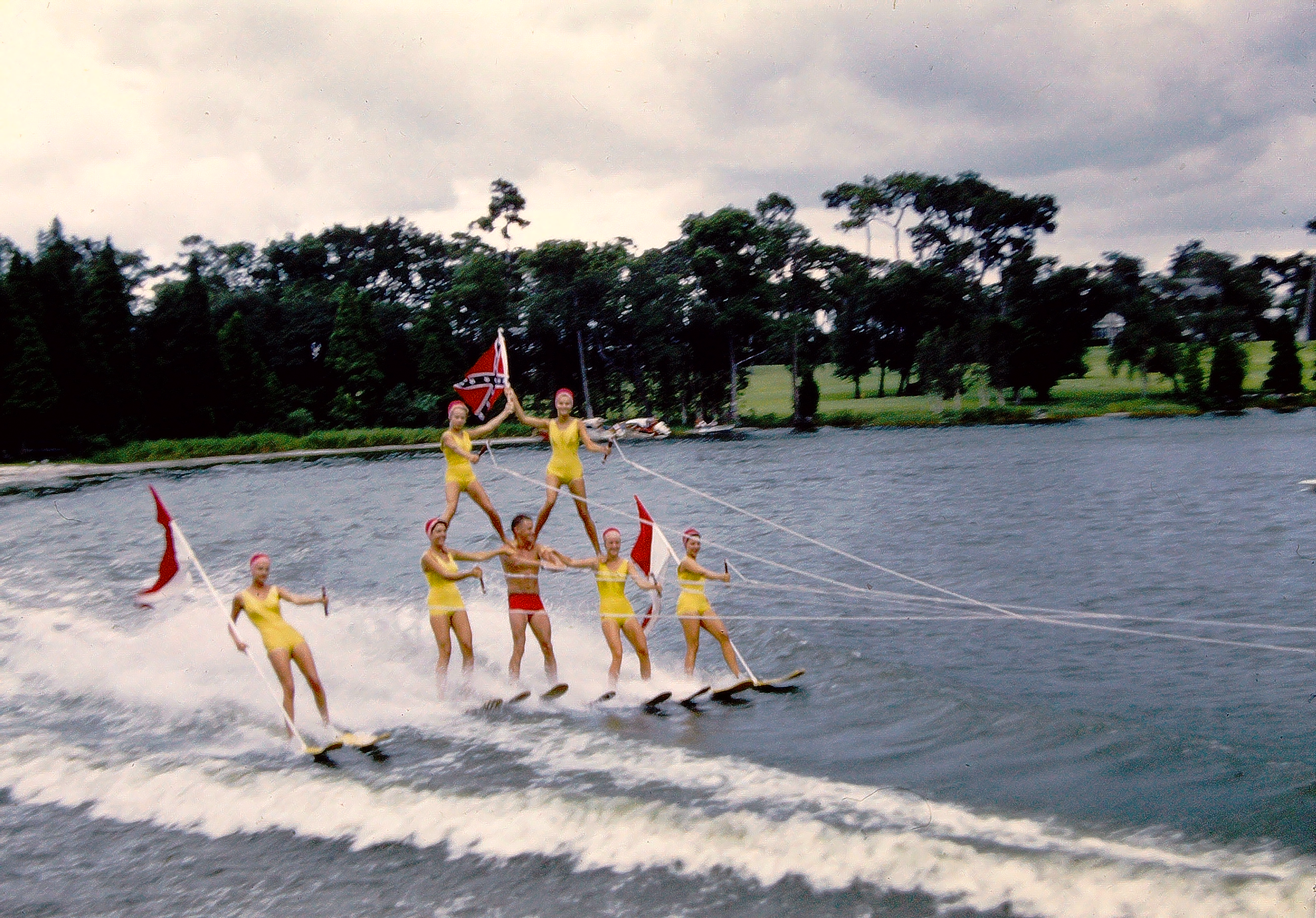
Cypress Gardens Ski Show 1970

== See also ==
- List of botanical gardens and arboretums in Florida
- Florida tourism industry
