= Lake Hamilton =

Lake Hamilton or Hamilton Lake may refer to:

- Hamilton Lake (Alberta), Canada
- Hamilton Lake (Nova Scotia), Canada
- Lake Rotoroa (Hamilton) or Hamilton Lake, a lake in New Zealand
  - Hamilton Lake (suburb), a residential suburb around Lake Rotoroa in Hamilton, New Zealand
- Lake Hamilton (Arkansas), U.S.
- Lake Hamilton, Arkansas, a community in the U.S.
- Lake Hamilton (Florida), U.S.
- Lake Hamilton, Florida, a town in the U.S.
