= Chain of Lakes Trail =

Recreational trail in Florida, US

Coordinates: 28.05195°N 81.73046°W

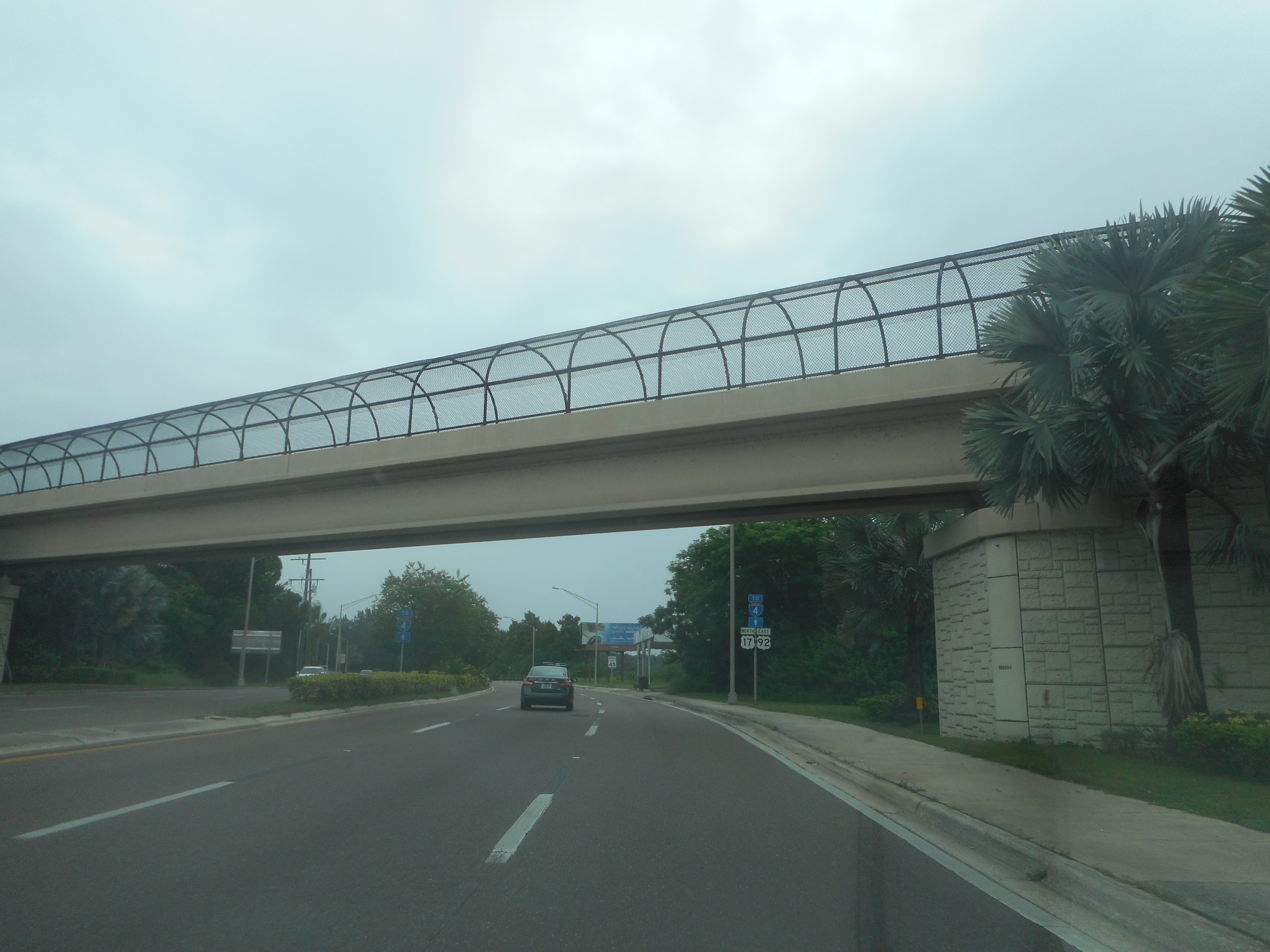
- US 17/92 as it passes under a bridge for the Chain of Lakes Trail in Lake Alfred, Florida.
- Length: 4.7 mi (7.6 km)
- Location: Winter Haven, Florida, United States
- Trailheads: Winter Haven; Lake Alfred
- Season: Year round
- Surface: Asphalt

The Chain of Lakes Trail is a 4.7 miles (7.6 km) paved multi-use path that runs from Lake Alfred to Winter Haven in Florida, past many of the lakes that compose the Winter Haven Chain of Lakes. The trail runs along the abandoned route of the South Florida Railroad's Bartow Branch (which was later part of the Atlantic Coast Line Railroad). The southern terminus of the trail is near Lake Howard at Avenue B Northwest near the Chamber of Commerce Building. The trail travels northward past Lake Silver, Spring Lake, Lake Ida, and Lake Conine before coming to an end at the southwest corner of West Haines Avenue and Shinn Boulevard (southbound U.S. Route 17 and westbound U.S. Route 92).

Originally running 3.2 miles (5.1 km) between Avenue E Northwest at the Winter Haven bus terminal near city hall and Lake Rochelle at US 17/92 in Lake Alfred, it was extended north over a bridge crossing US 17 and 92 running as far north as West Haines Avenue in Lake Alfred, as well as south through Winter Haven Central Park to the Chamber of Commerce Building in the late 2010s.
