= Lake May (Florida) =

- Location within Florida Location within the United States
- Location: Winter Haven, Florida
- Coordinates: 28.0131°N 81.7367°W
- Type: natural freshwater lake
- Basin countries: United States
- Max. length: 1,980 feet (600 m)
- Max. width: 1,390 feet (420 m)
- Surface area: 49.07 acres (20 ha)
- Surface elevation: 131 feet (40 m)

Lake May, a wedge-shaped lake, is a natural freshwater lake in southwest Winter Haven, Florida. This lake has a 49.07-acre (198,600 m^{2}) surface area. It is bounded on the east and northeast by vacant land, on the northwest by commercial property, on the west and most of the south by vacant land and on the east and southeast by more commercial property. Much of the shore around the lake is lined by swampy areas.

Public access is provided to Lake May on the south side at Lions Park. This public park is located on Avenue L Southwest. The park has a wooden elevated nature walk, a fishing dock and a playground. The Lake has no public swimming areas or boat ramps. However, Lake May is on the south Winter Haven Chain of Lakes canal system, which connects it to a number of area lakes. A canal on the north connects Lake May directly to Lake Howard and another canal on the south connects it directly to Lake Shipp. The Take Me Fishing website says Lake May contains largemouth bass, bluegill, bream, bluefish and black crappie. The Hook and Bullet website mirrors the types of fish in Lake May.
