= Lake Roy (Florida) =

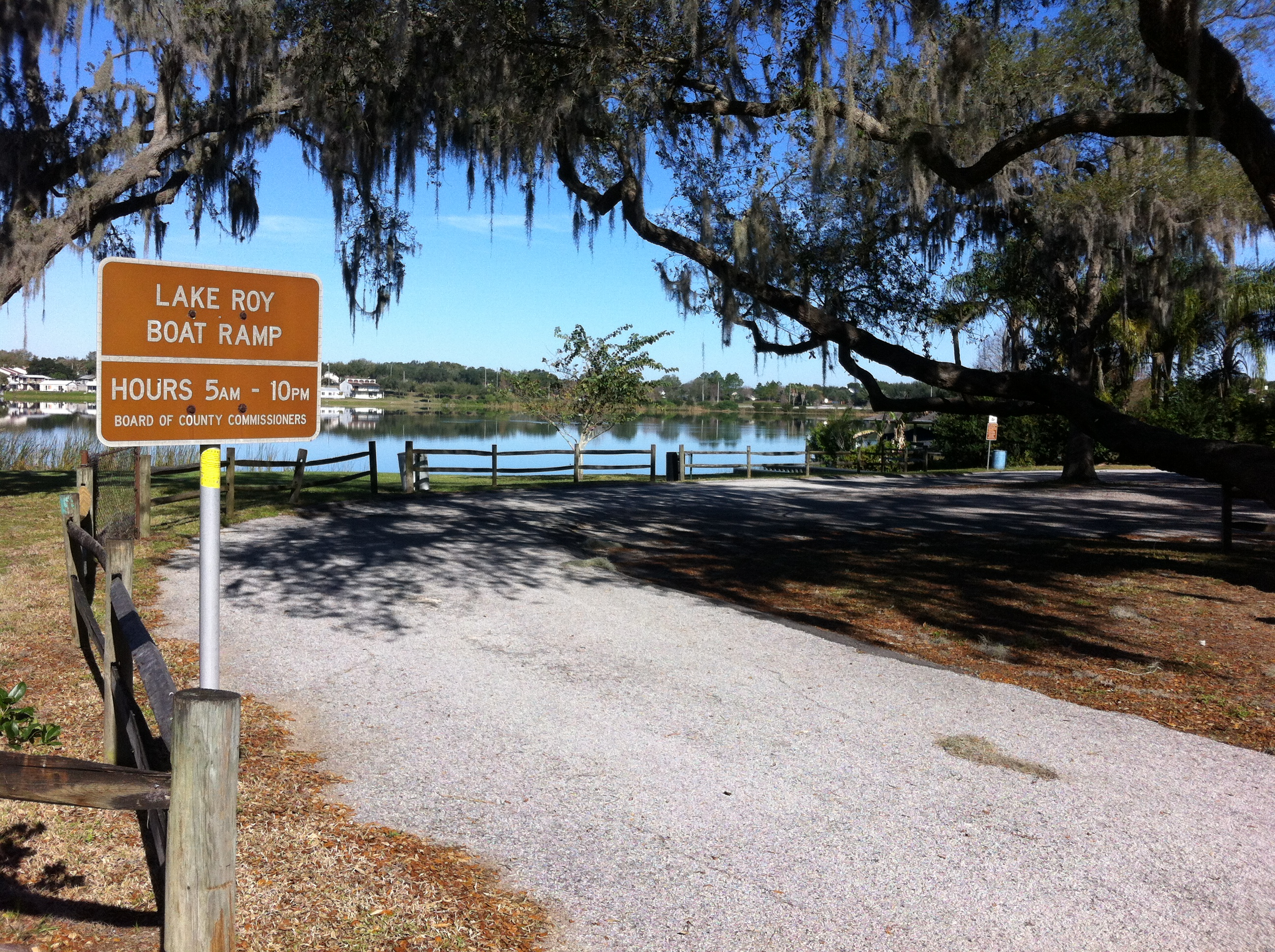
- Lake Roy Park - Public Boat Ramp, Picnic Area and Beach

- Location within Florida Location within the United States
- Location: Polk County, Florida
- Coordinates: 28.0028°N 81.7054°W
- Type: natural freshwater lake
- Basin countries: United States
- Max. length: 3,165 feet (965 m)
- Max. width: 1,735 feet (529 m)
- Surface area: 74.17 acres (30 ha)
- Surface elevation: 131 feet (40 m)
- Settlements: Winter Haven, Florida

Lake Roy is a natural freshwater lake inside the city of Winter Haven, Florida. It has a 74.17-acre (300,200 m^{2}) surface area and is located on the south side of Cypress Gardens Boulevard. The lake once had a larger surface area, but when Cypress Gardens Boulevard was upgraded it ran over some of the northern part of Lake Roy; this part had been filled so the road could be rerouted. A small part of the old lakebed is north of the street, but is more of a retention pond now, for the most part remaining dry. The lake is of an irregular shape. Lake Roy is connected by a canal on its southwest side to Lake Lulu and indirectly from there to more than twenty other area lakes. These lakes are linked by canals and are known locally as the Chain of Lakes. Most of the shore of Lake Roy is bordered by residential housing. Residential areas circle from the southeast around to the northwest side of the lake. Along Cypress Gardens Boulevard on the northwest are businesses and a hotel, Lake Roy Beach Inn, is on this street at the northeast corner of the lake.

There is a county park with a swimming area and boat ramp on the lake's southeastern shore. The boating public may reach Lake Roy from other lakes by traveling to it via the canal system. Fishing is allowed and the lake may be fished from Lake Roy Park or from the north shore where Cypress Gardens Boulevard borders the lake. The Hook and Bullet website says Lake Roy contains bowfin, bluegill and sturgeon.
