= Inwood, Florida =

- Census-designated place
- Location in Polk County and the state of Florida
- Coordinates: 28°02′21″N 81°46′04″W
- Country: United States
- State: Florida
- County: Polk

Area
  - Total: 1.99 sq mi (5.15 km^{2})
  - Land: 1.90 sq mi (4.93 km^{2})
  - Water: 0.085 sq mi (0.22 km^{2})
- Elevation: 151 ft (46 m)

Population (2020)
  - Total: 7,031
  - Density: 3,693.4/sq mi (1,426.03/km^{2})
- Time zone: UTC-5 (Eastern (EST))
  - Summer (DST): UTC-4 (EDT)
- Zip codes: 33880 - 33881
- Area code: 863
- FIPS code: 12-34000
- GNIS feature ID: 2402619

Inwood is a census-designated place (CDP) in Polk County, Florida, United States. As of the 2020 census, Inwood had a population of 7,031. It is part of the Lakeland–Winter Haven Metropolitan Statistical Area.

== Geography ==
According to the United States Census Bureau, the CDP has a total area of 2.0 square miles (5.2 km^{2}), of which 1.9 square miles (4.9 km^{2}) is land and 0.1 square miles (0.26 km^{2}) (4.50%) is water.

The four lakes in Inwood are as follows:

- Lake Blue
- Lake Cannon
- Lake Jessie
- Lake Deer

Lake Blue is the only lake located entirely within Inwood.

== Demographics ==
Historical population
| Census | Pop. | Note | %± |
|---|---|---|---|
| 1950 | 2,326 | | — |
| 1960 | 5,050 | | 117.1% |
| 1970 | 7,716 | | 52.8% |
| 1980 | 6,668 | | −13.6% |
| 1990 | 6,824 | | 2.3% |
| 2000 | 6,925 | | 1.5% |
| 2020 | 7,031 | | — |

=== 2020 census ===
As of the 2020 census, Inwood had a population of 7,031. The median age was 36.3 years. 24.2% of residents were under the age of 18 and 14.0% of residents were 65 years of age or older. For every 100 females there were 95.0 males, and for every 100 females age 18 and over there were 93.1 males age 18 and over.

100.0% of residents lived in urban areas, while 0.0% lived in rural areas.

There were 2,725 households in Inwood, of which 29.4% had children under the age of 18 living in them. Of all households, 31.3% were married-couple households, 24.3% were households with a male householder and no spouse or partner present, and 34.7% were households with a female householder and no spouse or partner present. About 31.5% of all households were made up of individuals and 11.7% had someone living alone who was 65 years of age or older.

There were 3,106 housing units, of which 12.3% were vacant. The homeowner vacancy rate was 3.2% and the rental vacancy rate was 10.7%.

Racial composition as of the 2020 census
| Race | Number | Percent |
|---|---|---|
| White | 3,436 | 48.9% |
| Black or African American | 2,170 | 30.9% |
| American Indian and Alaska Native | 48 | 0.7% |
| Asian | 63 | 0.9% |
| Native Hawaiian and Other Pacific Islander | 3 | 0.0% |
| Some other race | 581 | 8.3% |
| Two or more races | 730 | 10.4% |
| Hispanic or Latino (of any race) | 1,629 | 23.2% |

=== 2000 census ===
As of the 2000 census, there were 6,925 people, 2,835 households, and 1,774 families residing in the CDP. The population density was 3,612.1 inhabitants per square mile (1,394.6/km^{2}). There were 3,249 housing units at an average density of 1,694.7 per square mile (654.3/km^{2}). The racial makeup of the CDP was 68.29% White, 23.51% African American, 0.38% Native American, 1.01% Asian, 3.51% from other races, and 3.31% from two or more races. Hispanic or Latino of any race were 7.86% of the population.

There were 2,835 households, out of which 28.8% had children under the age of 18 living with them, 40.4% were married couples living together, 15.6% had a female householder with no husband present, and 37.4% were non-families. 30.5% of all households were made up of individuals, and 10.8% had someone living alone who was 65 years of age or older. The average household size was 2.44 and the average family size was 3.05.

In the CDP, the population was spread out, with 26.6% under the age of 18, 10.0% from 18 to 24, 29.0% from 25 to 44, 20.8% from 45 to 64, and 13.6% who were 65 years of age or older. The median age was 35 years. For every 100 females, there were 97.2 males. For every 100 females age 18 and over, there were 92.7 males.

The median income for a household in the CDP was $25,973, and the median income for a family was $29,472. Males had a median income of $22,957 versus $20,024 for females. The per capita income for the CDP was $13,295. About 14.8% of families and 19.1% of the population were below the poverty line, including 24.8% of those under age 18 and 16.4% of those age 65 or over.

== Education ==
The public schools in Inwood are run by the Polk County School Board. There are 2 public elementary, 1 public middle, and 1 private schools listed in the following:

- Elementary public schools
  - Inwood Elementary School
  - Garner Elementary School
- Middle public schools
  - Westwood Middle School
- Private schools
  - Immanuel Luther Church and School
