= Lake Hamilton, Florida =

Town in the state of Florida, United States

- Town
- Town of Lake Hamilton
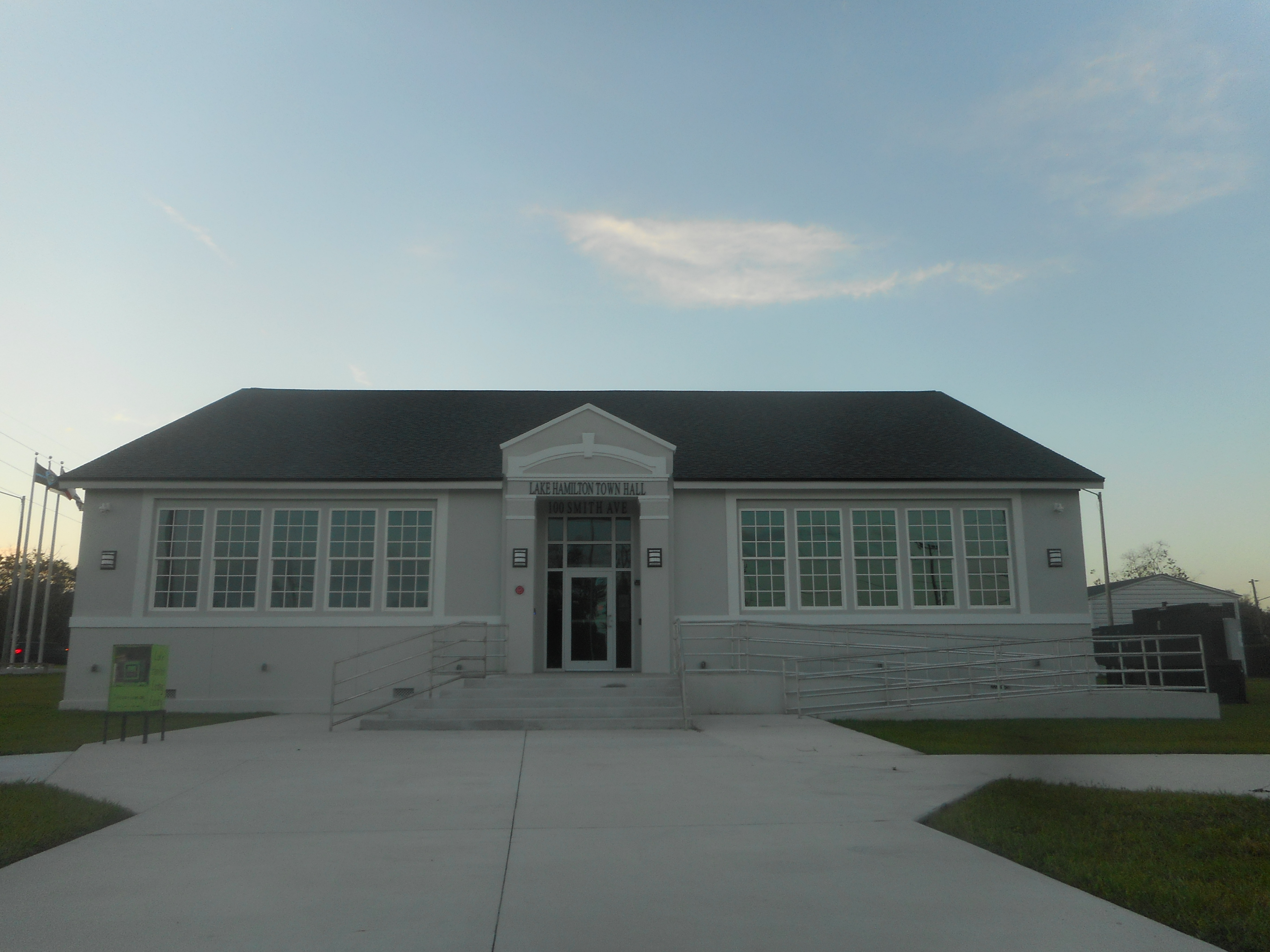
- Lake Hamilton Town Hall and Police Department

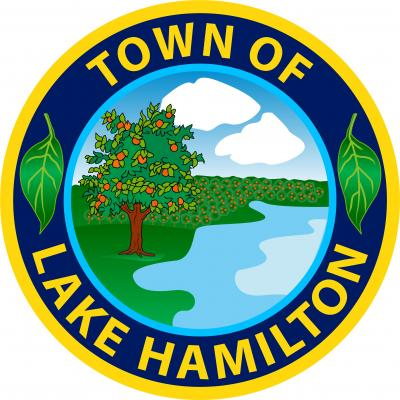
- Seal

- Location in Polk County and the state of Florida
- Coordinates: 28°02′54″N 81°37′17″W
- Country: United States
- State: Florida
- County: Polk
- Settled (Lake Hambleton): c. 1854–1856
- Founded (Lake Hamilton): 1913
- Incorporated (Town of Lake Hamilton): November 6, 1924
- Formally Incorporated (Town of Lake Hamilton): 1925

Government
  - Type: Mayor-Council
  - Mayor: Phyllis Hall
  - Vice Mayor: Robert Mathis
  - Council Members: Carmen Demanche and Cora Roberson
  - Town Administrator: Brittney Sandoval
  - Town Clerk: Jacqueline Borja

Area
  - Total: 4.10 sq mi (10.63 km^{2})
  - Land: 3.12 sq mi (8.08 km^{2})
  - Water: 0.98 sq mi (2.55 km^{2})
- Elevation: 131 ft (40 m)

Population (2020)
  - Total: 1,537
  - Density: 492.6/sq mi (190.21/km^{2})
- Time zone: UTC-5 (Eastern (EST))
  - Summer (DST): UTC-4 (EDT)
- ZIP code: 33851
- Area code: 863
- FIPS code: 12-37975
- GNIS feature ID: 2405972
- Website: www.townoflakehamilton.com

Lake Hamilton is a town in Polk County, Florida, United States. The population was 1,537 at the 2020 census. It is part of the Lakeland–Winter Haven Metropolitan Statistical Area.

== History ==
The original name for the main lake and its community was formerly called "Lake Hambleton", which had unknown origins, and ruled out that it was named from Alexander Hamilton. During the Seminole Wars, specifically the Third Seminole War, Chief Chipco, who was a tribal leader for the Muscogee Creek and Seminole tribes, settled off Lake Hamilton's Bonars Island, along with some of his tribal members, from around 1854 to around 1856.

The community was resettled by non-indigenous people in 1913, when the first home was built along with other platted buildings and other infrastructure. On November 6, 1924, it became incorporated as the Town of Lake Hamilton, however it wasn't officially recognized as a chartered municipality until 1925.

The town is named after the lake itself: Lake Hamilton, which is one of the many lakes in the Chain of Lakes. Also, Middle Lake Hamilton and Little Lake Hamilton are located nearby.

From 1964 through the 1970s, Hurricane Aircats, military airboats used by the US Army in Vietnam, were manufactured in Lake Hamilton. The airboats were made by Hurricane Fiberglass Products Company, an airboat and fiberglass manufacturer based in the neighboring town of Auburndale.

== Geography ==
According to the United States Census Bureau, the town has a total area of 3.9 square miles (10 km^{2}), of which 3.0 square miles (7.8 km^{2}) is land and 0.9 square miles (2.3 km^{2}) (22.51%) is water.

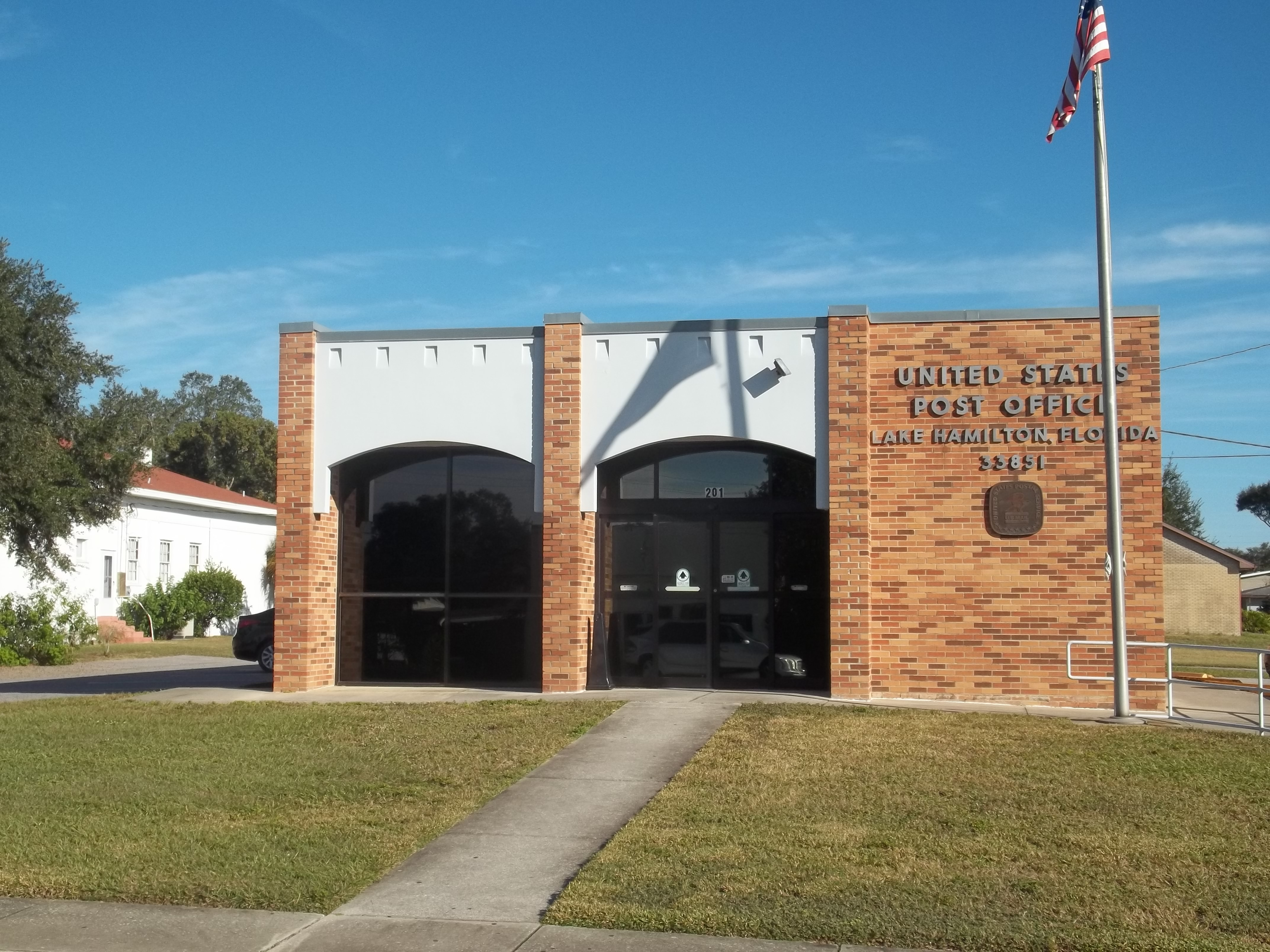
United States Post Office of Lake Hamilton

The dominant geographic feature in the city is the large lake after which the city is named. Lake Hamilton is part of the Chain of Lakes. The lake has a surface area of 2,184 acres (8,840,000 m^{2}) and an average depth of 7.2 feet (2.2 m).

=== Climate ===
The climate in this area is characterized by hot, humid summers and generally mild winters. According to the Köppen climate classification, the Town of Pierson has a humid subtropical climate zone (Cfa).

== Demographics ==
Historical population
Census	Pop.	Note	%±
1930	399		—
1940	344		−13.8%
1950	604		75.6%
1960	930		54.0%
1970	1,165		25.3%
1980	1,552		33.2%
1990	1,128		−27.3%
2000	1,304		15.6%
2010	1,231		−5.6%
2020	1,537		24.9%
U.S. Decennial Census

=== Racial and ethnic composition ===
Lake Hamilton racial composition (Hispanics excluded from racial categories) (NH = Non-Hispanic)
Race	Pop 2010	Pop 2020	% 2010	% 2020
White (NH)	730	659	59.30%	42.88%
Black or African American (NH)	296	258	24.05%	16.79%
Native American or Alaska Native (NH)	3	7	0.24%	0.46%
Asian (NH)	10	18	0.81%	1.17%
Pacific Islander or Native Hawaiian (NH)	0	0	0.00%	0.00%
Some other race (NH)	6	40	0.49%	2.60%
Two or more races/Multiracial (NH)	21	52	1.71%	3.38%
Hispanic or Latino (any race)	165	503	13.40%	32.73%
Total	1,231	1,537		

=== 2020 census ===
As of the 2020 census, Lake Hamilton had a population of 1,537. The median age was 38.6 years. 23.9% of residents were under the age of 18 and 16.7% of residents were 65 years of age or older. For every 100 females there were 94.1 males, and for every 100 females age 18 and over there were 94.4 males age 18 and over.

82.3% of residents lived in urban areas, while 17.7% lived in rural areas.

There were 551 households in Lake Hamilton, of which 37.9% had children under the age of 18 living in them. Of all households, 50.1% were married-couple households, 16.7% were households with a male householder and no spouse or partner present, and 24.9% were households with a female householder and no spouse or partner present. About 19.0% of all households were made up of individuals and 7.8% had someone living alone who was 65 years of age or older.

There were 612 housing units, of which 10.0% were vacant. The homeowner vacancy rate was 0.9% and the rental vacancy rate was 11.4%.

According to the 2020 American Community Survey 5-year estimates, there were 348 families residing in the town.

=== 2010 census ===
As of the 2010 United States census, there were 1,231 people, 474 households, and 284 families residing in the town.

=== 2000 census ===
At the 2000 census there were 1,304 people, 482 households, and 362 families in the town. The population density was 430.0 inhabitants per square mile (166.0/km^{2}). There were 535 housing units at an average density of 176.4 per square mile (68.1/km^{2}). The racial makeup of the town was 71.09% White, 25.15% African American, 0.46% Native American, 0.31% Asian, 0.08% Pacific Islander, 2.30% from other races, and 0.61% from two or more races. Hispanic or Latino of any race were 5.06%.

Of the 482 households in 2000, 31.5% had children under the age of 18 living with them, 55.6% were married couples living together, 17.2% had a female householder with no husband present, and 24.7% were non-families. 21.0% of households were one person and 8.5% were one person aged 65 or older. The average household size was 2.67 and the average family size was 3.09.

The age distribution in 2000 was 27.1% under the age of 18, 6.6% from 18 to 24, 26.4% from 25 to 44, 25.1% from 45 to 64, and 14.8% 65 or older. The median age was 39 years. For every 100 females, there were 92.0 males. For every 100 females age 18 and over, there were 85.5 males.

In 2000, the median household income was $33,438 and the median family income was $38,050. Males had a median income of $28,281 versus $21,833 for females. The per capita income for the town was $16,199. About 13.3% of families and 21.5% of the population were below the poverty line, including 40.5% of those under age 18 and 5.6% of those age 65 or over.

== Transportation ==
- State Road 17 – The Scenic Highway going through the center of town, paralleling US 27 and leading southward to downtown Dundee and Lake Wales
- US 27 – Located just west of town, this divided highway leads to Lake Wales and Haines City.
