= Conine =

Conine may refer to the following:

== People ==
- Griffin Conine (born 1997), American professional baseball player
- Jeff Conine (born 1966), former Major league Baseball player
- Steve Conine, American billionaire businessman
- Zach Conine, American attorney, businessman, and politician

== Places ==
- Lake Conine, freshwater lake in Winter Haven, Florida
- Conine's Clubhouse Grill, a grill owned by Jeff Conine

== Other ==
- Coniine, a poisonous alkaloid found in poison hemlock
- Conine, an Irish clan
