= Westwood Middle School =

Westwood Middle School may refer to:

- Westwood Middle School in Inwood, Florida
- Westwood Middle School in Gainesville, Florida
- Westwood Regional Middle School in Westwood, New Jersey
- Westwood Middle School in Morgantown, West Virginia
