= Lake Idylwild =

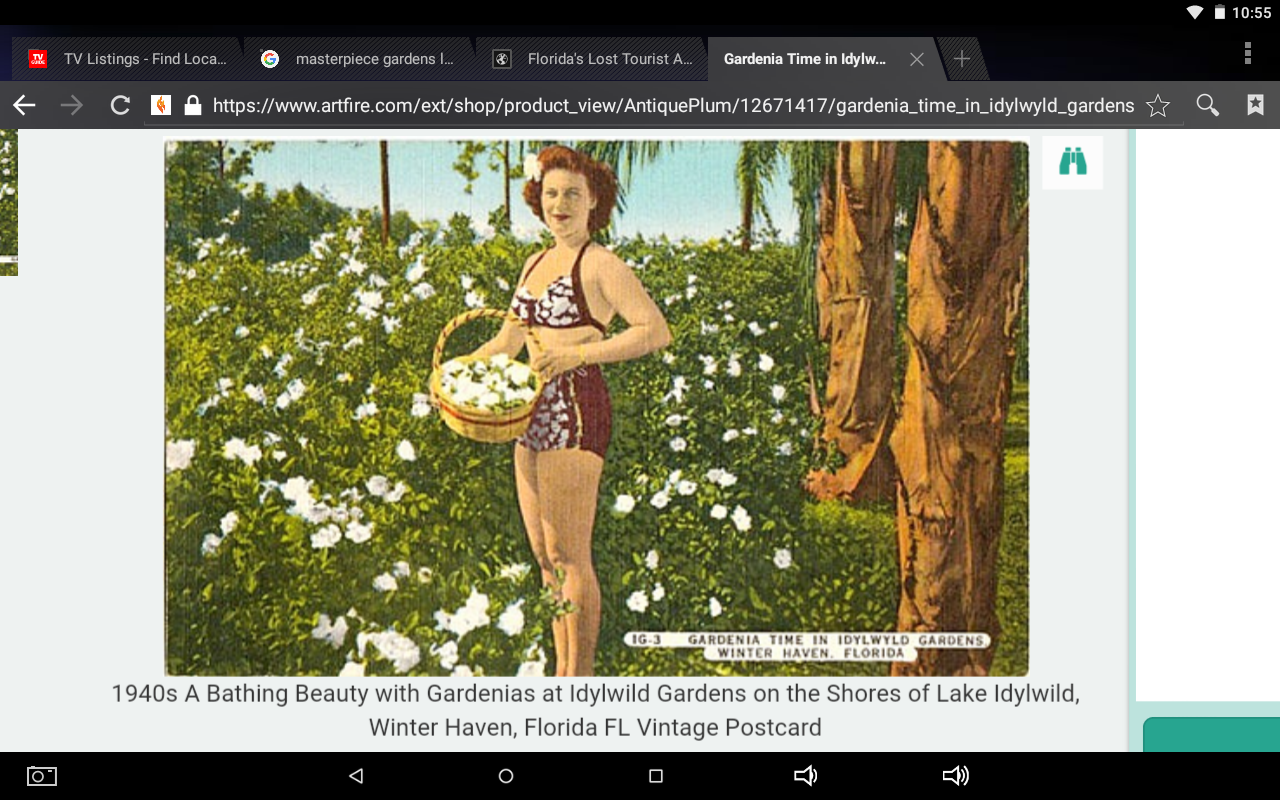
- 1940's postcard of Idylwyld Gardens on shores of Lake Idylwild

- Location within Florida
- Location: Winter Haven, Florida
- Coordinates: 28.0503°N 81.7567°W
- Type: natural freshwater lake
- Basin countries: United States
- Max. length: 1,460 feet (450 m)
- Max. width: 1,310 feet (400 m)
- Surface area: 95.48 acres (39 ha)
- Average depth: 5 feet (1.5 m)
- Max. depth: 17.7 feet (5.4 m)
- Water volume: 243,392,295 US gallons (921,340,060 L)
- Surface elevation: 131 feet (40 m)
- Islands: one, 50 feet (15 m) by 45 feet (14 m)

Lake Idylwild, which is round, has a surface area of 95.48-acre (386,400 m^{2}). The lake has one small island, almost rectangular in shape, that measures 50 feet (15 m) by 45 feet (14 m). It is just north of a canal on the northwest side the leads to Lake Jessie. Lake Idylwild is on the northwest side of Winter Haven, Florida. Residential areas border this lake on the northeast and western shores. On the south side are various commercial buildings. A woody area borders the southeast shore and the northwest shore is bordered by a grassy area.

Lake Idylwild has no public access directly. There are no boat ramps or public swimming areas. However, boats may access the lake from three canals. One on the northwest, connects to Lake Jessie. One on the east connects to Lake Hartridge. The third canal, on the south, connects to Lake Cannon. Lake Idylwild is part of the south part of the Winter Haven Chain of Lakes system, so boats may travel some distance to reach this lake. The Take Me Fishing website says this lake contains largemouth bass, black crappie and bluegill.

== History ==
In the 1940s there was an attraction on the shores of Lake Idylwild, called "Idylwyld Gardens". (See reference link #4 and #5 to photos of vintage post cards.) Idylwyld Gardens is now considered to be a "lost park".
