= Little Lake Hamilton =

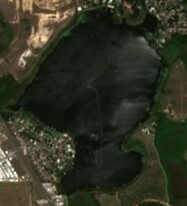

- Location within Florida
- Location: Haines City, Florida
- Coordinates: 28.0720°N 81.6345°W
- Type: natural freshwater lake
- Basin countries: United States
- Max. length: 1.04 miles (1.67 km)
- Max. width: 0.84 miles (1.35 km)
- Surface area: 367 acres (149 ha)
- Surface elevation: 121 feet (37 m)

Little Lake Hamilton has a surface area of 367-acre (1,490,000 m^{2}). Little Lake Hamilton is bordered by Haines City, Florida, on its north side and is almost bordered by the town of Lake Hamilton, Florida, on its south side. This lake is in places bordered by residences and in other places is bordered by woods and pastureland. It is east of Middle Lake Hamilton and is ironically much larger than that lake.

Little Lake Hamilton has no public access along its shores. However, it is part of the north system of the Winter Haven Chain of Lakes. It can be reached by canal from Middle Lake Hamilton, but only tiny boats can navigate this canal. The Take Me Fishing website says this lake contains largemouth bass and bluegill.
