= Interlaken Historic Residential District =

Historic district in Florida, United States

- U.S. National Register of Historic Places
- U.S. Historic district
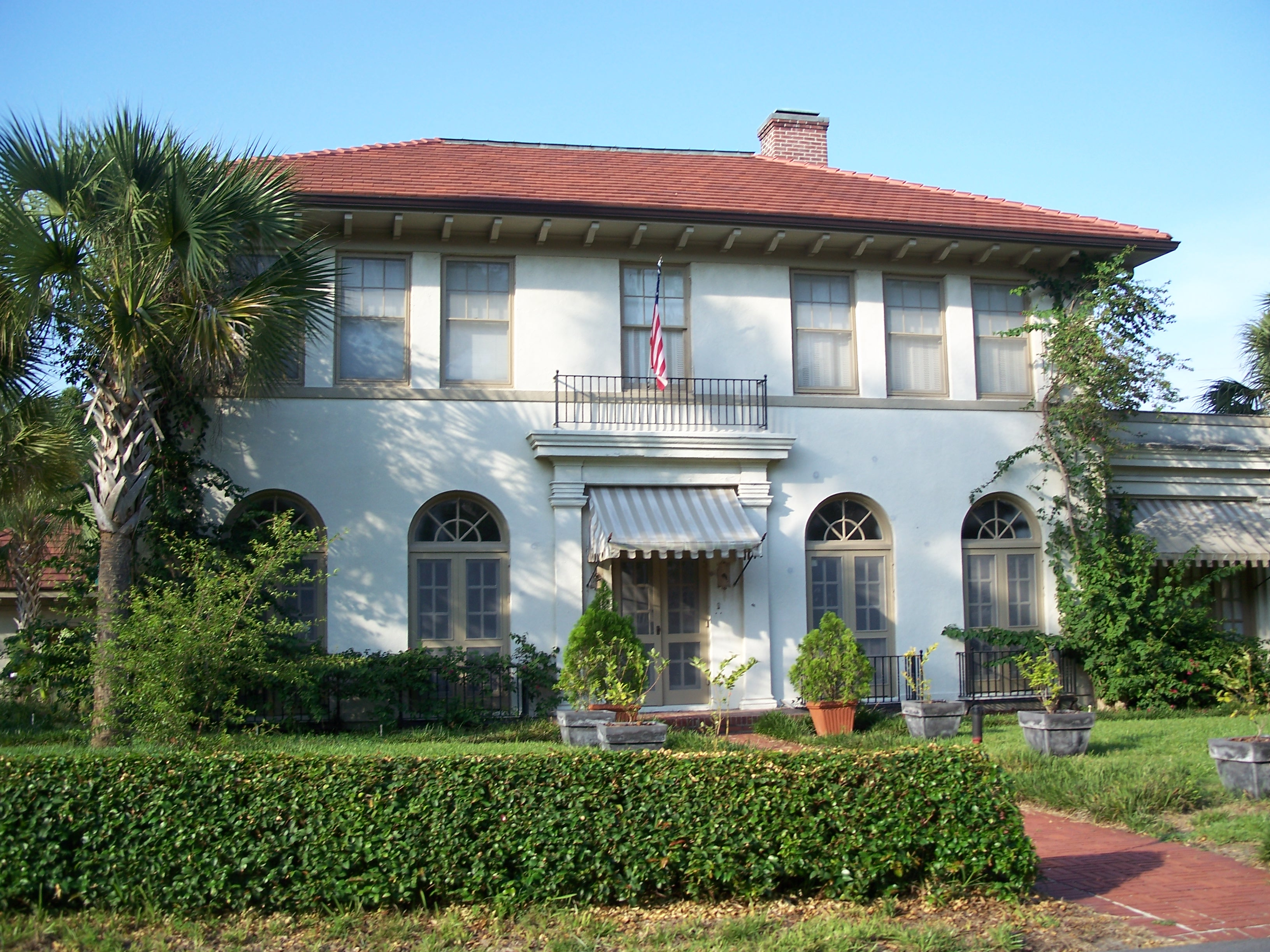

- Location within Florida Location within the United States
- Location: Winter Haven, Florida
- Coordinates: 28.03359°N 81.74375°W
- Area: 300 acres (1.2 km^{2})
- NRHP reference No.: 02000266
- Added to NRHP: March 28, 2002

The Interlaken Historic Residential District is a U.S. historic district (designated as such on March 28, 2002) located in Winter Haven, Florida.

The neighborhood of Interlaken is approximately 300 acres (1.2 km^{2}). It is bound in by the lakes and canals of the Chain of Lakes. The term "Interlaken" means "between lakes". The primary boundaries are the north shore of Lake Howard, the southwest shore of Lake Mirror, and the Cannon-Howard Canal.

The neighborhood consists exclusively of single-family homes. More than two-thirds of the homes in Interlaken, 50 homes in total, are on the National Register of Historic Places. The majority of these home were built between 1910 and 1924, with some being built as late as 1949. These homes are noted for their grace and beauty, and as prime examples of Colonial Revival architectural style.

Interlaken Park is a small public park in the neighborhood, located at Avenue L and Orange St. The land for the park was originally platted for a single family home construction, like the rest of the neighborhood. However, speculators drove up the price of the lot, only to have it crash in the Florida land bust of 1925 and the Great Depression. Dr. Willey Terrell Simpson, who lived across from the park, purchased it during the height of the depression at a greatly reduced price. He then donated it to the city for use as a public park. It is the only lot in the neighborhood not developed as a single-family home. Today the park provides open space and individual picnic facilities.

== Gallery ==
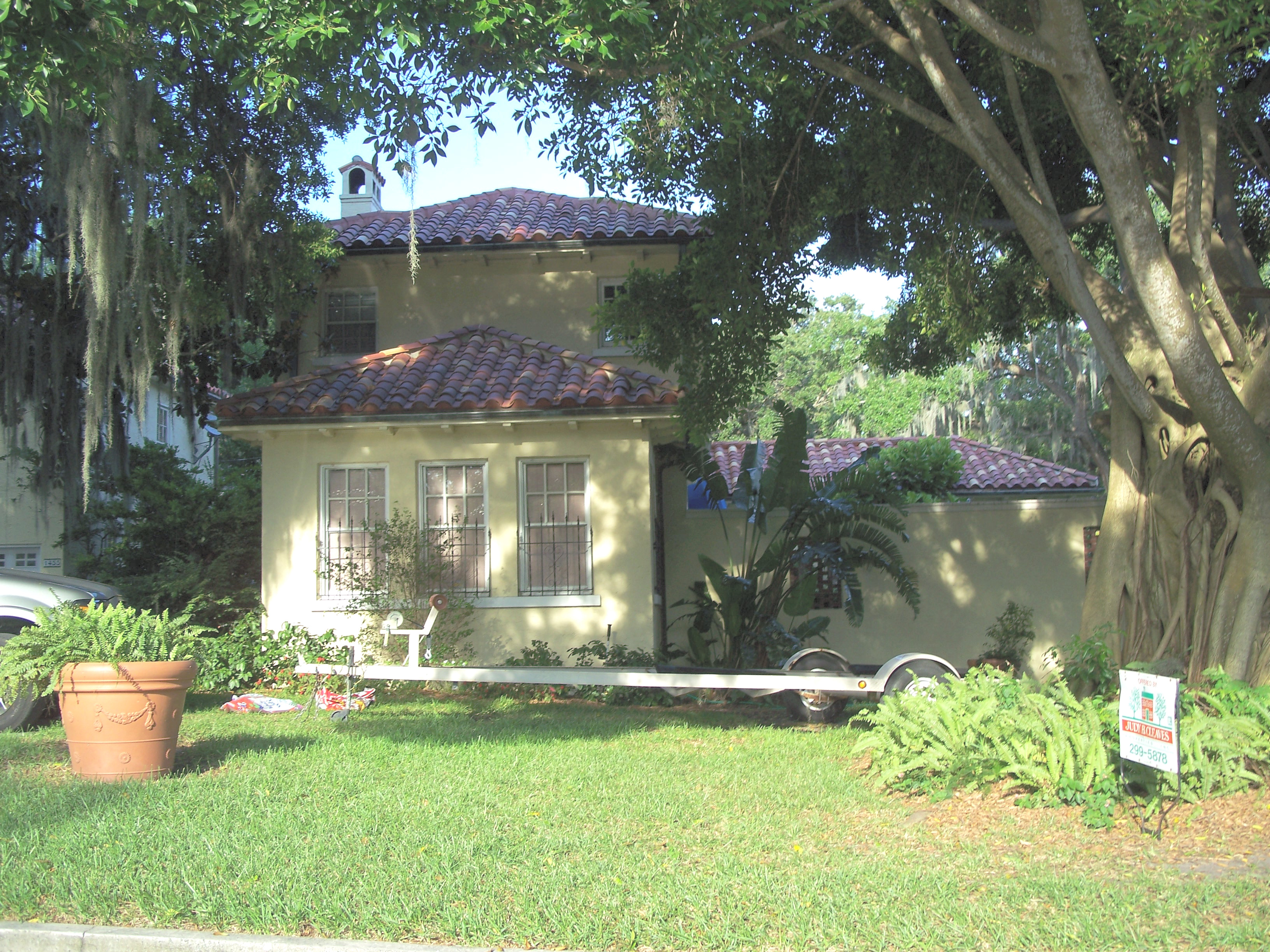

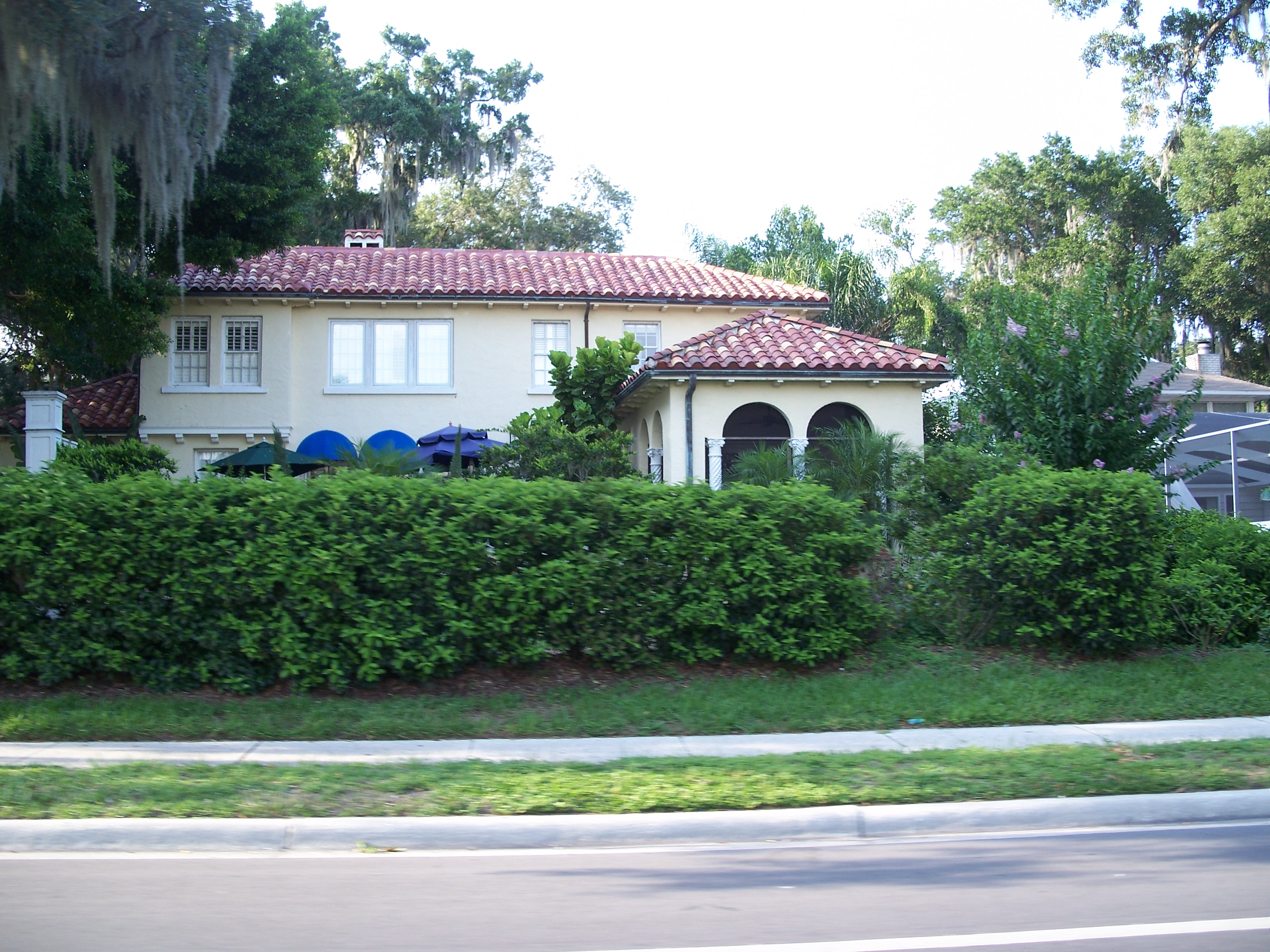
