= Lake Hartridge =

- Location within Florida
- Location: Winter Haven, Florida
- Coordinates: 28.0567°N 81.7429°W
- Type: natural freshwater lake
- Basin countries: United States
- Max. length: 4,225 feet (1,288 m)
- Max. width: 2,250 feet (690 m)
- Surface area: 433 acres (175 ha)
- Average depth: 5.3 feet (1.6 m)
- Max. depth: 21.5 feet (6.6 m)
- Water volume: 1,340,424,557 US gallons (5.07405891×10^{9} L)
- Surface elevation: 131 feet (40 m)

Lake Hartridge, with somewhat of a figure eight shape, has a surface area of 433-acre (1,750,000 m^{2}). This lake is on the north side of Winter Haven in Polk County, Florida. Most of the lake's west shore is bordered by residential areas. The northwest shore is bordered by woods. The north shore is bordered woods and clearings. The northeast is bordered by more clearings. The east central and southeast shores are bordered by woods and a few residences. At the very southeast corner is Aldora Park, a small public park. The south shore is bordered by a large church. On the southwest shore is Lake Hartridge Nature Park, a public park.

Lake Hartridge has public access at both Lake Hartridge Nature Park and Aldora Park. The Nature Park has a public boat ramp just off Beach Parkway. This park has a fishing pier, a .5 miles (0.80 km) walking trail around a pond, a playground and picnic facilities. This Lake is part of the south part of the Winter Haven Chain of Lakes system. A canal on the southwest side connects Lake Hartridge to Lake Idylwild. Another canal on the northeast side connects the lake to Lake Conine. This lake has no public swimming areas. Nothing is reported on the species of fishes in this lake.
