= Lake Lulu =

- Location within Florida
- Location: Polk County, Florida
- Coordinates: 27.9964°N 81.7209°W
- Type: natural freshwater lake
- Basin countries: United States
- Max. length: 2.42 miles (3.89 km)
- Max. width: 1.17 miles (1.88 km)
- Surface area: 315 acres (127 ha)
- Surface elevation: 131 feet (40 m)
- Settlements: Winter Haven, Florida

Lake Lulu is a natural freshwater lake in Winter Haven, Florida. The lake has a 315-acre (1,270,000 m^{2}) surface area and has a somewhat irregular oval shape. It is bounded on the north and northeast by private residences. It has no eastern or western sides, as the lake's shore comes to a point on those two sides. At the eastern point, it is bounded by West Lake Eloise Drive and about 75 feet (23 m) beyond that is Lake Eloise. The entire south side of the lake is lined with a swampy area and a dense growth of trees.

On the northwest, Lake Lulu is bordered by the Chain of Lakes Complex. Part of this is the Chain of Lakes Park, which is on the south portion of the Chain of Lakes Complex. The entire south end of the complex consists of baseball fields. The Chain of Lakes Park is one particular baseball stadium that was built in 1966 to serve as the Boston Red Sox spring training facility. It was renovated in 1993 and the Cleveland Indians used the stadium for spring training until 2009. This stadium, located 225 feet (69 m) from the lake's shore, is no longer used for spring training.

Lake Lulu can be accessed by the public on the eastern point bordering on West Lake Eloise Drive and on the shore along the Chain of Lakes Complex. In theory, it can be accessed along the entire south side. This is very swampy and finding solid ground to walk to the lake is inadvisable. There are no public boat ramps or swimming areas on the lake's shore. However, Lake Lulu is part of the Winter Haven Chain of Lakes, and is accessible by boat from a number of area lakes via canal. Lake Lulu is directly connected by canal to Lake Shipp to the west and Lake Eloise and Lake Roy to the east. The Hook and Bullet website says Lake Lulu contains largemouth bass, bluegill and crappie.
