= Lake Smart =

- Location within Florida
- Location: Winter Haven, Florida
- Coordinates: 28.0589°N 81.7109°W
- Type: natural freshwater lake
- Basin countries: United States
- Max. length: 4,810 feet (1,470 m)
- Max. width: 3,655 feet (1,114 m)
- Surface area: 277 acres (112 ha)
- Surface elevation: 128 feet (39 m)

Lake Smart is a round natural freshwater lake, with a semicircular cove on its northwest side, on the northeast side of Winter Haven, Florida. Lake Smart has a water area of 277-acre (1,120,000 m^{2}). This lake is mostly surrounded by woods and citrus groves. On its north and west sides it is bordered by residential developments. On the northwest Florida State Route 544 runs along Lake Smart's cove.

This lake has no public swimming areas or public boat ramps. However, a canal in the cove goes to Lake Conine to the west. Another canal, some of the time unusable because of its shallowness, is on the east side and connects to Lake Fannie. Lake Smart is on the northern chain of lakes connected by canals in the Winter Haven Chain of Lakes. In addition, the public may reach the shore of Lake Smart along Route 544, so this lake can be fished and boated by the public. The Hook and Bullet website says Lake Smart contains largemouth bass, bluegill and crappie.
