= Jack Browns Seaplane Base =

Coordinates: 28°03′27.0″N 081°45′46.1″W

- IATA: none; ICAO: none; FAA LID: F57

Summary
- Airport type: Public use
- Owner/Operator: Jon K. Brown
- Serves: Winter Haven, Florida
- Location: Polk County, Florida
- Elevation AMSL: 140 ft (43 m)
- Website: http://www.brownsseaplane.com
- Interactive map of Jack Browns Seaplane Base

Runways
Direction	Length		Surface
Direction	ft	m	Surface
1/19	3,600	1,097	Water

Statistics (2009)
- Aircraft operations: 10,000
- Based aircraft: 5
- Source: Federal Aviation Administration

Jack Browns Seaplane Base (FAA LID: F57) is a public-use seaplane base located 3 nautical miles (5.56 km) northwest of the central business district of Winter Haven in Polk County, Florida, United States. It is located on the northeast shore of Lake Jessie, which is part of the Winter Haven Chain of Lakes. The privately owned seaplane base is located adjacent to Winter Haven's Gilbert Airport and connected to it by an asphalt taxiway.

== Facilities and aircraft ==
Jack Browns Seaplane Base covers an area of 8 acres (3.2 ha) at an elevation of 140 feet (42.7 m) above mean sea level. It has one water runway: 1/19 is 3,600 by 2,200 feet (1,097 x 670.6 m).

For the 12-month period ending November 17, 2009, the airport had 10,000 general aviation aircraft operations, an average of 27 per day. At that time there were 5 aircraft based at this airport: 80% single-engine and 20% multi-engine.

== Accidents ==
On March 7, 2023, at 1900Z, two aircraft collided during training. All 4 people aboard the two planes died.

== See also ==
- List of airports in Florida
