= Lake Summit =

- Location within Florida
- Location: Polk County, Florida
- Coordinates: 27.9988°N 81.6948°W
- Type: natural freshwater lake
- Basin countries: United States
- Max. length: 2,000 feet (610 m)
- Max. width: 1,845 feet (562 m)
- Surface area: 65.97 acres (27 ha)
- Surface elevation: 131 feet (40 m)
- Settlements: Winter Haven, Florida

Lake Summit is a natural freshwater lake in Winter Haven, Florida. It has a 65.97-acre (267,000 m^{2}) surface area and is somewhat oval in shape. It has two small coves on its north side. This lake is surrounded by residences around most of its perimeter. It has a public park, Lake Summit Park, on part of its west side, and Legoland Florida's water park is on its southeast shore. A boat canal on the south side of Lake Summit leads to Lake Eloise.

Lake Summit has no public swimming areas but does have a public boat ramp. Also, the lake may be reached by boat via canal from Lake Eloise. Lake Summit is indirectly linked to many other lakes on the Winter Haven Chain of Lakes. The lake may be fished from shore at the park or by boat. The Hook and Bullet website says Lake Summit contains largemouth bass, bluegill and crappie.
