= Lake Eloise =

Body of water in Florida, US

- Location within Florida
- Location: Polk County, Florida
- Coordinates: 27.9836°N 81.7040°W
- Type: natural freshwater lake
- Basin countries: United States
- Max. length: 1.92 miles (3.09 km)
- Max. width: 1.31 miles (2.11 km)
- Surface area: 1,174 acres (475 ha)
- Surface elevation: 131 feet (40 m)
- Settlements: Winter Haven, Florida

Lake Eloise is a large natural freshwater lake on the south side of Winter Haven, Florida. It is part of the southern Chain of Lakes. With a 1,174-acre (4,750,000 m^{2}) surface area, it is one of the larger lakes in Polk County, Florida. Lake Eloise has a somewhat oval shape and has a large cove on its south side. It borders Lake Summit on its northeast and it almost borders Lake Lulu on its northwest. Lake Eloise is mostly surrounded by residential areas. However, the northern half of its eastern shore is occupied by Legoland Florida, which was once Cypress Gardens, a large area theme park. Some citrus groves border the lake on its west side. Eloise Loop Road passes by the south end of the cove on the lake's south side.

Lake Eloise was first surveyed in 1849, by Dr John Westcott. He named the lake after Eloise Moody, daughter of Polk County pioneer Benjamin F. Moody. The lake appears in the first U.S. Government survey of the area, published in 1950.

Cypress Gardens opened in 1936 and soon had various attractions, including ones that had a connection to Lake Eloise. In the 1930s the park had water shows with water ski performances. Two grandstands were constructed to allow spectators to see the shows. The botanical garden, on the north side of the park, eventually had channels cleared for small boats to travel with visitors to view the plants. A large decorative pool in the shape of Florida was constructed just on shore and in the western edge of the botanical garden. Also, a large paddle boat was refurbished and dubbed the Cypress Belle. The Cypress Belle allowed park visitors to cruise on Lake Eloise. Also, at times the Belle was used for dinner cruises. Through the years various television shows and movies filmed at Cypress Gardens and many times filming made use of Lake Eloise. After 2000 Cypress Gardens went through various major changes to maintain its visitor base and finally closed in fall 2009.

In 2010 the old Cypress Gardens park was purchased with the intention of transforming it into a Legoland park. In February 2011 it was opened as Legoland Florida. While the paddle boat and boat rides through the botanical garden were not restored, the area of the old water shows was named Pirate Cove and a new ski and stunt show was started.

Although Lake Eloise is a large lake, there is very little public access to it. There is no public access from the shore, as all shoreline is on private property. The public can access the lake by boat via the Chain of Lakes canal system. Lake Eloise is linked by canal directly to Lake Lulu, Lake Summit and Lake Winterset. The nearest public boat ramp is on Lake Summit and the canal system links Lake Eloise to a number of area lakes. Fishing is allowed from boats. As there is no shore access, there are no public swimming areas. Lake Eloise contains bluegill, crappie, and largemouth bass.
