= Chain of Lakes (Winter Haven) =

Series of lakes in Central Florida, US

The Chain of Lakes is a famous series of lakes in Central Florida. There are two chains of lakes, the northern chain and the southern chain. The northern chain extends across three cities: Winter Haven, Lake Alfred, and Lake Hamilton. It has ten lakes, connected by a series of canals. The ten lakes on the northern chain are Lake Haines, Lake Rochelle, Lake Echo, Lake Conine, Lake Fannie, Lake Smart, Lake Henry, Lake Hamilton, Middle Lake Hamilton, and Little Lake Hamilton.

The southern chain is located almost entirely within the city of Winter Haven. It has 16, sometimes 18, lakes connected by a series of canals. The principal 16 lakes on the southern chain are Lake Howard, Lake Cannon, Lake Shipp, Lake Jessie, Lake Hartridge, Lake Lulu, Lake Roy, Lake Eloise, Little Lake Eloise, Lake Winterset, Little Lake Winterset, Lake May, Lake Mirror, Lake Idylwild, Spring Lake and Lake Summit.

== Hydrography ==
Winter Haven and the chain of lakes sit at the headwaters of the Peace River basin. The southern chain has a total surface area of approximately 4,331 acres (1,753 ha). The largest lake in the southern chain is Lake Eloise, with a surface area of 1,174 acres (475 ha). The smallest lake in the southern chain is Spring Lake, with a surface area of 24 acres (9.7 ha).

Paleolimnological studies have shown that the chain of lakes should have naturally high levels of tannins, which are caused by detritus from plants in the water. These tannins create the brown color characteristic in many lakes and slow-moving rivers in Florida. Currently, the majority of the lakes in both chains are officially listed as 'impaired' by the Florida Department of Environmental Protection. Impairment is based on the whether a lake meets its "designated uses", often referred; these lakes are designated as "fishable/swimmable". Examples of other designations include drinking water, shellfish propagation, and industrial use. The impaired lakes on the southern chain are Lulu, Shipp, May, Howard, Mirror, Cannon, Jessie, Idylwild, Spring, and Roy. The impaired lakes on the northern chain are Conine, Smart, Haines, Rochelle, and Hamilton. These lakes have TSI numbers below 60.

The chain of lakes, as the headwaters of the Peace River, are important to the hydrological and environmental health of the region. The city of Winter Haven, Polk County, the Southwest Florida Water Management District, the state of the Florida, and the federal government all have working projects to improve the water quality levels within the chain of lakes. Sometimes these projects work well with each other; sometimes they do not. Rapid urbanization around the chain of lakes threatens their long-term environmental health. Greater care by the residents in the area will be required to preserve the chain of lakes for future generations.

== History ==
The Calusa were the first people to live in the chain of lakes area. Later, both the Creek and the Seminole were known to live and hunt in this area. The Seminole name for the entire chain of lakes is "We-hi-ack-pa". The area had no European or American settlement until the Florida Armed Occupation Act of 1842, which created incentives for settlers. Some of the lakes on the chain were named by these early settlers, including Lake Eloise, named for the daughter of the first American settler on that lake.

During the 1840s and 1850s, the United States government conducted the first surveys of the area. In 1849, Dr. John Westcott completed an extensive survey of the area. Westcott named several of the lakes on the chain after his personal friends, including Lake Howard, Lake Hartridge, and Lake Conine. Westcott, a devout Christian, also named Lake Canon, in reference to his religious beliefs. However, it was later renamed Lake Cannon by U.S. Army map-makers during the Seminole Wars. Several small battles and skirmishes during the Seminole Wars occurred on the chain of lakes. The Seminole leader Chipco is known to have lived along the shores of Lake Hamilton during the Second Seminole War.

In 1883, Henry Plant successfully built the first railroad across Polk County, passing right through the chain of lakes area. Some of the lakes were named by railroad workers at this time. Lake Haines is named for Col. Henry Haines, a senior railroad official. Col. Haines was a prominent civil engineer and helped lay the roadbed used for the railroad tracks to cross the wetlands in this area. Nearby Lake Henry and the neighboring community of Haines City are also named for Col. Haines.

The land around the chain of lakes was platted in 1884. By 1900, the area had a population of 400 people. The city of Winter Haven was incorporated in 1911. In the 1920s and 1930s, the citrus industry expanded throughout the area, with thousands of acres of groves along the chain of lakes. John A. Snively played a significant role in developing citrus groves in the area. During this period, many homes in the Colonial Revival architectural style were built along the Chain of Lakes, including most of the historic homes in the Interlaken Historic Residential District.

In 1936, Dick and Julie Pope opened Cypress Gardens on Lake Eloise. Through his efforts to promote his theme park, Dick Pope Sr. helped to make the Chain of Lakes world famous. Chain of Lakes Park was built on Lake Lulu in 1966. The Boston Red Sox, and later the Cleveland Indians, did their spring training there. The park also hosted several minor league teams. The area has continued to grow since then.

== Transportation ==
The first railroad line built in the area, by Henry Plant and Col. Henry Haines, passed close to Lake Henry and Lake Haines on the northern chain.

The major roads passing near the chain of lakes today are U.S. 17, U.S. 92, State Road 544, and State Road 540. Jack Browns Seaplane Base is located on Lake Jessie.

In addition, there is a multi-use paved hiking/biking trail known as the Chain of Lakes Trail that runs 4.7 miles from Central Park, in downtown Winter Haven, past Trailhead Park near Lake Silver, and then north to Lake Alfred. This trail follows an old rail line and includes a pedestrian bridge across M.L.K. Blvd. N.W. Parking for this trail is best found at Trailhead Park.
