= Lake Echo (Polk County, Florida) =

Natural lake in Florida, U.S.

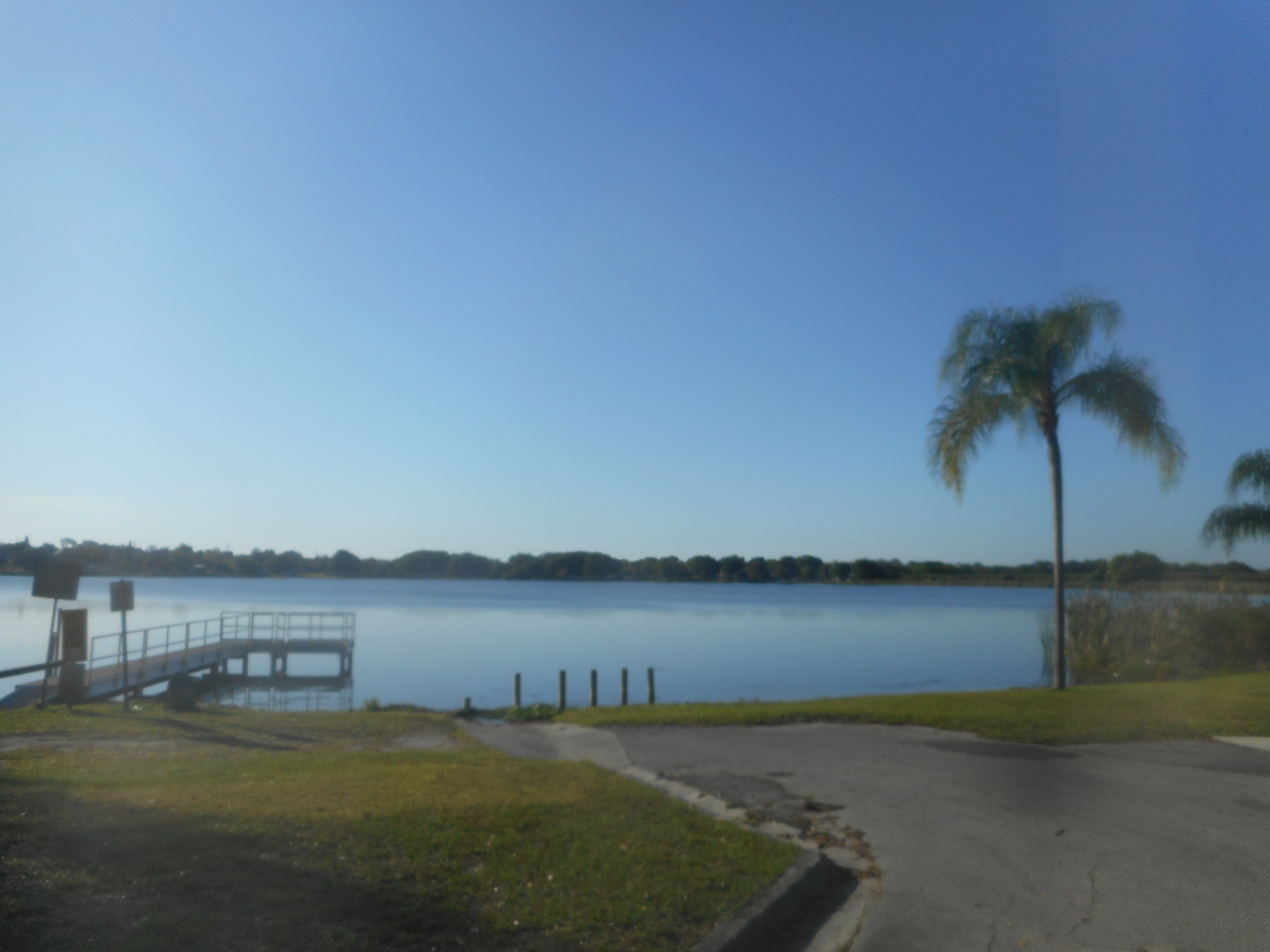
- Lake Echo as seen from the boating dock on South Winona Avenue, March 2022.

- Location within Florida Location within the United States
- Location: Lake Alfred, Florida
- Coordinates: 28.0825°N 81.7340°W
- Type: Natural freshwater lake
- Primary outflows: St.John's River
- Basin countries: United States
- Max. length: 1,500 feet (460 m)
- Max. width: 1,430 feet (440 m)
- Surface area: 68.92 acres (28 ha)
- Max. depth: 16 feet (4.9 m)
- Surface elevation: 131 feet (40 m)

Lake Echo, which is almost round, has a surface area of 68.92-acre (278,900 m^{2}). Lake Echo is inside the city of Lake Alfred, Florida. The north and east shores and part of the south shore are bordered by residences. The west and southwest shores are bordered by citrus groves. The southeast shore is bordered by a wooded area. Lake Cummings is 360 feet (110 m) west of Lake Echo.

Lake Echo has public access at two places. One is on the northwest side of the lake, at the end of South Winona Avenue. Here is the Lake Echo Boat Ramp, which consists of a public boat ramp and public fishing dock/boat dock. On the south side of the lake, at the end of South Nekoma Avenue, is the Echo Terrace Dock. This consists of a public fishing dock and picnic table. The lake has no public swimming beach. Also, a canal on the southeast shore goes to nearby Lake Rochelle. This canal, however, is not always full of water and cannot be navigated by any boats. Technically, since Lake Echo is connected by a canal to Lake Rochelle, it is part of the northern system of the Winter Haven Chain of Lakes. There is no information on Lake Echo about the types of fish in the lake.
