= Lake Winterset =

- Location within Florida
- Location: Polk County, Florida
- Coordinates: 27.9745°N 81.6820°W
- Type: natural freshwater lake
- Basin countries: United States
- Max. length: 1.14 miles (1.83 km)
- Max. width: 0.95 miles (1.53 km)
- Surface area: 556 acres (225 ha)
- Surface elevation: 131 feet (40 m)
- Settlements: Winter Haven, Florida

Lake Winterset is a large natural freshwater lake on the south side of Winter Haven, Florida. This lake has a 556-acre (2,250,000 m^{2}) surface area and is round with an oval-shaped cove on its south end. The cove is connected to the main part of the lake by a short, wide channel. This lake is almost entirely surrounded by private residences, most of them in subdivisions, the majority of them gated subdivisions. Just to the north of Lake Winterset is Cypress Gardens Boulevard. About 1,000 feet (300 m) to the west is Lake Eloise; Dollar Lake and Round Lake are just to the southeast.

Although this is a large lake there is no public access to the lake shore, since it is surrounded by private property. Therefore, Lake Winterset has no public swimming areas or boat ramps. However, the Chain of Lakes canal system links Lake Winterset to many area lakes. A canal on the west side directly links the lake to Lake Eloise. Boats can use Lake Winterset and the public may fish from private boats entering the lake. The Hook and Bullet website says this lake contains flathead catfish, bluegill and largemouth bass.
