= Lake Fannie =

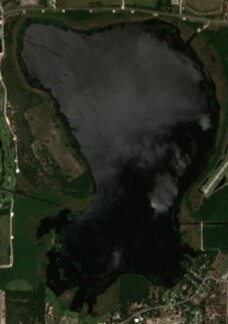
- Satellite image of Lake Fannie

- Location within Florida
- Location: Winter Haven, Florida
- Coordinates: 28.0603°N 81.6895°W
- Type: natural freshwater lake
- Basin countries: United States
- Max. length: 1.48 miles (2.38 km)
- Max. width: 1.20 miles (1.93 km)
- Surface area: 802 acres (325 ha)
- Surface elevation: 125 feet (38 m)

Lake Fannie is a natural freshwater lake on the northeast side of Winter Haven, Florida. This lake has an 802-acre (3,250,000 m^{2}) surface area. Much of its shoreline area is swamp like, but the rest of the lake is free of surface vegetation. Lake Idyl is bordered on the north by Polk County Road 544, on part of the east side by a residential area and on most of the rest of its shoreline by woods.

The public has access to this lake on its north shore, along County road 544. Also, a public boat ramp, accessed from 544, in on the northeast shore of Lake Fannie. Lake Fannie is part of the north system of the Winter Haven Chain of Lakes. Lake Fannie is connected by canal on its west side to Lake Smart and on its east side to Lake Hamilton (Florida). However, for a number of years the water level in the canals was so low or even nonexistent that Lake Fannie did not connect into the canal system. There are no public swimming areas on this lake's shore. The Hook and Bullet website says this lake contains gar, channel catfish, blue catfish, warmouth and bluegill.
