= Lake Cannon =

- Location within Florida
- Location: Winter Haven, Florida
- Coordinates: 28.0389°N 81.7526°W
- Lake type: natural freshwater lake
- Part of: Chain of Lakes (Winter Haven), Peace River - Peace Creek Canal Watershed
- Primary outflows: Peace River
- Catchment area: 695 acres (2.81 km^{2})
- Basin countries: United States
- Max. length: 4,585 feet (1,398 m)
- Max. width: 4,085 feet (1,245 m)
- Surface area: 333 acres (135 ha)
- Average depth: 13 feet (4.0 m)
- Max. depth: 16 feet (4.9 m)
- Surface elevation: 131 feet (40 m)

Lake Cannon, an almost round lake, has a surface area of 333-acre (1,350,000 m^{2}). This lake is part of the south system of the Winter Haven Chain of Lakes, so it may be reached by boats coming from a number of public boat ramps in the system. About 300 feet (91 m) to the lake's east is Lake Mirror and 500 feet (150 m) to the southeast is Lake Howard. Lake Cannon is surrounded by residential areas except for a small portion of its northern shore, which remains vacant.

== History ==
The lake was first mapped by Dr. John Westcott for the United States government. Dr. Westcott was a deeply religious man, and originally gave it the name Lake Canon. However, the United States Army renamed it to Lake Cannon during the Seminole Wars.

== Nearby locations ==
On the northwest shore, just south of the Boys and Girls Club of Polk County, is Lake Cannon Park which features a public boat ramp, floating dock, parking area, and playground with picnic tables.

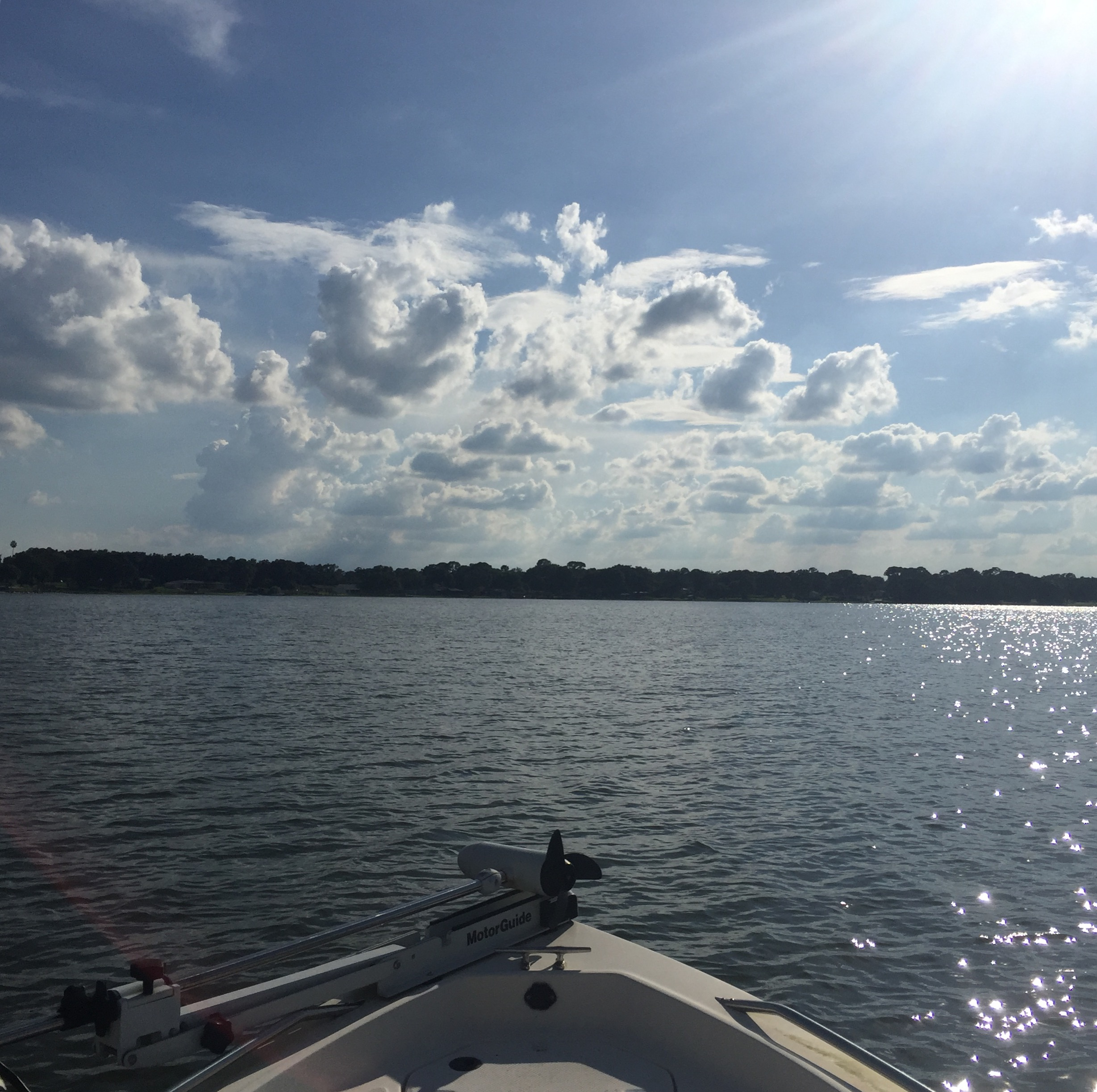
A boat travels west, across Lake Cannon towards Lake Cannon Boat Ramp.

Boats may reach Lake Cannon from four canals. One connects this lake to Lake Mirror, to the North, another connects it to Lake Howard, to the South, a third connects it to Lake Idylwild, to the north, and a fourth connects to Lake Blue, to the west. The Take Me Fishing website says Lake Cannon contains largemouth bass, bluegill and black crappie.
