= Lake Henry (Polk County, Florida) =

- Location within Florida Location within the United States
- Location: northeast of Winter Haven, Florida
- Coordinates: 28.0928°N 81.6673°W
- Type: natural freshwater lake
- Basin countries: United States
- Max. length: 1.83 miles (2.95 km)
- Max. width: 1.18 miles (1.90 km)
- Surface area: 848 acres (343 ha)
- Average depth: 4.8 feet (1.5 m)
- Max. depth: 78.4 feet (23.9 m)
- Water volume: 1,807,235,016 US gallons (6.84112873×10^{9} L)
- Surface elevation: 125 feet (38 m)
- Islands: a number of islets near the shores

Lake Henry, a lake that borders on the northeast side of Winter Haven, Florida, has a surface area of 848-acre (3,430,000 m^{2}). The southwest corner of the lake is inside the Winter Haven City limits. All of the south side of the lake is bordered by mobile home parks and housing developments. A part of the west side is bordered by a mobile home park, as is part of the north side of the lake. The rest of Lake Henry is bordered by wooded areas. The Polk County Water Atlas says Lake Henry is sometimes known as Lake Drane.

Lake Henry has no public access on its shores, although there a canal on the south side that connects it to Lake Hamilton. Since Lake Henry is part of the northern chain of the Winter Haven Chain of Lakes, it may be reached by boat from a number of lakes in the chain. There is no information about the types of fish found in the lake.
