= Lake Mirror (Winter Haven) =

Lake in Florida, United States

- Location within Florida
- Location: Winter Haven, Florida
- Coordinates: 28.0378°N 81.7417°W
- Type: Natural Freshwater Lake
- Part of: Chain of Lakes (Winter Haven), Peace River - Peace Creek Canal Watershed
- Primary outflows: Peace River
- Catchment area: 153 acres (0.62 km^{2})
- Basin countries: United States
- Max. length: 3,135 feet (956 m)
- Max. width: 2,335 feet (712 m)
- Surface area: 123 acres (50 ha)
- Average depth: 8.9 feet (2.7 m)
- Water volume: 1,737,103 cubic metres (61,345,200 cu ft)
- Surface elevation: 131 feet (40 m)

Lake Mirror, an egg shaped lake has a surface area of 131-acre (530,000 m^{2}). Lake Mirror is in a highly urbanized area. Other than on its northeast shore, it is surrounded by residences. On the northeast it is bordered by a woody area. About 200 feet (61 m) to its east is Spring Lake and about 250 feet (76 m) to its west is Lake Cannon.

There is no public access to the shores of Lake Mirror. However, boats may reach Lake Mirror from a canal connecting it to Lake Cannon. Another canal connects it to Spring Lake. This lake is part of the south system of the Winter Haven Chain of Lakes, so it may be reached by boats coming from a number of public boat ramps in the system. The Hook and Bullet website says Lake Mirror contains largemouth bass, bluegill and crappie.

== History ==
In 1849, the area was surveyed by Dr. John Wescott. Lakes Mirror, Cannon, and Spring were one waterbody during times of high water and were notated as one lake (Lake Canon) on the original government plat of 1854. Lake Mirror is first recorded as a separate lake on the 1890 Lake Region map.

== Water Quality ==
Lake Mirror has an average clarity of 3 feet, as measured with a secchi disk, with 242 samples taken between January 1987 and February 2026.

Lake Mirror has a healthy aquatic plant community. The lake has had a 'healthy' rating on the Lake Vegetation Index (LVI) every year on record except for 2007. The LVI is an assessment created by Florida Department of Environmental Protection (FDEP) to evaluate how closely a lake's vegetative community matches a reference lake with minimal human disturbance. Lake Mirror has had an average LVI of 56 since 2020.
