= Spring Lake (Winter Haven) =

- Location within Florida
- Location: Winter Haven, Florida
- Coordinates: 28.0381°N 81.7351°W
- Type: natural freshwater lake
- Basin countries: United States
- Max. length: 1,265 feet (386 m)
- Max. width: 965 feet (294 m)
- Surface area: 24.19 acres (10 ha)
- Surface elevation: 131 feet (40 m)

Spring Lake, an oval-shaped lake, has a surface area of 24.19-acre (97,900 m^{2}). Spring Lake is in a highly urbanized area. On the north shore is a retail area, US Highway 17 is on its east side. Apartment buildings are on the south side of the lake. A wooded area is on the west; about 200 feet (61 m) to Spring Lake's west is Lake Mirror.

There is no public access to the shores of this lake, since it is completely surrounded by private property. However, boats may reach Spring Lake from a canal connecting it to Lake Mirror. This lake is part of the south system of the Winter Haven Chain of Lakes, so it may be reached by boats coming from a number of public boat ramps in the system. The Hook and Bullet website says this lake contains rainbow trout.
