= Lake Jessie (Winter Haven, Florida) =

- Location within Florida Location within the United States
- Location: Winter Haven, Florida
- Coordinates: 28.0578°N 81.7631°W
- Type: natural freshwater lake
- Basin countries: United States
- Max. length: 2,360 feet (720 m)
- Max. width: 1,540 feet (470 m)
- Surface area: 189 acres (76 ha)
- Average depth: 4.9 feet (1.5 m)
- Max. depth: 12.2 feet (3.7 m)
- Water volume: 503,694,517 US gallons (1.90669116×10^{9} L)
- Surface elevation: 131 feet (40 m)

Lake Jessie, with somewhat of an oval shape, has a surface area of 189-acre (760,000 m^{2}). This lake is on the northwest side of Winter Haven, Florida, and is just east of Auburndale, Florida. Residential areas border this lake from the northwest shore all the way south along the west shore, ending where the south shore of the lake meets the east shore of the lake. At this point a canal separates the residences from some woods on the southeast shore of Lake Jessie. These woods are on the edge of Winter Haven Municipal Airport. Airport property occupies the entire east and northeast shores of the lake. Jack Brown's Seaplane Base, on the northeast shore and a part of the airport uses the northeast shore of Lake Jessie for seaplane takeoffs and landings. Most of the north shore of the lake is bordered by more woods.

Lake Jessie has public access at the public boat ramp on the west side of the lake, where Morton Road ends at the ramp. Boats may access Lake Jessie via a canal connecting this lake to Lake Idylwild on the southeast corner of the lake. Another canal near Jack Brown's Seaplane Base provides access to Lake Mariana to the north. However, this canal is very small and not always navigable. Lake Jessie is part of the south part of the Winter Haven Chain of Lakes system, so boats may travel some distance to reach this lake. This lake has no public swimming areas. The Take Me Fishing website says Lake Jessie contains largemouth bass and bluegill.
