= Lake Rochelle =

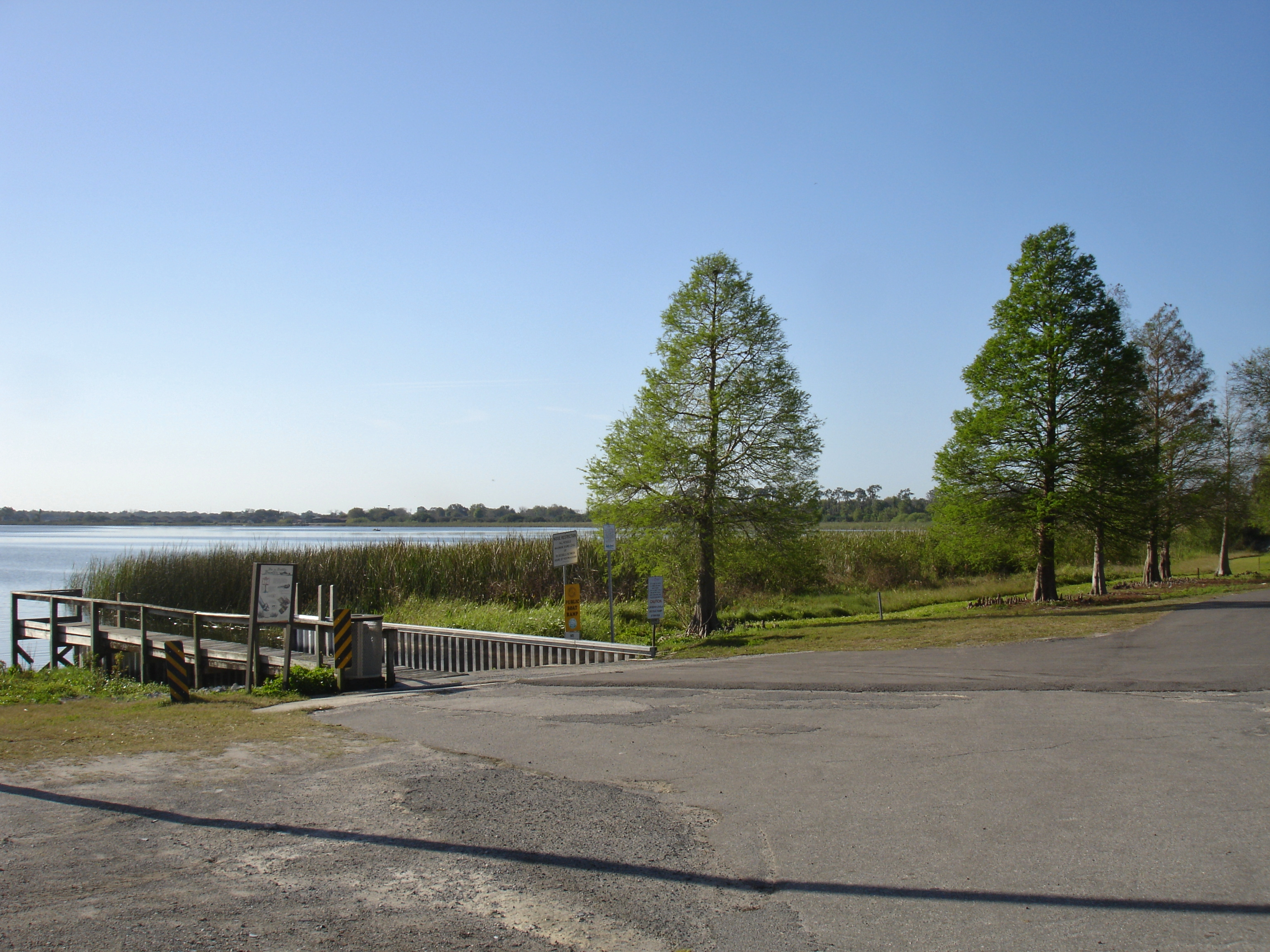
- Boat ramp on Lake Rochelle

- Location within Florida
- Location: between Lake Alfred, Florida and Winter Haven, Florida
- Coordinates: 28.0728°N 81.7215°W
- Type: natural freshwater lake
- Basin countries: United States
- Max. length: 1.43 miles (2.30 km)
- Max. width: 0.79 miles (1.27 km)
- Surface area: 580 acres (235 ha)
- Average depth: 10.5 feet (3.2 m)
- Max. depth: 22.5 feet (6.9 m)
- Surface elevation: 128 feet (39 m)
- Settlements: entire lake is within Lake Alfred, Florida

Lake Rochelle, of which the main body is oval-shaped, has a smaller oval-shaped cove on its east end. This lake has a surface area of 580-acre (2,300,000 m^{2}). The lake is located just north of Winter Haven, Florida, but is located entirely within the city limits of Lake Alfred, Florida, the main part of which is on the lake's northwest side. On that side US Highway 92 is just beyond the lake's shore. Most of the north and west sides of Lake Rochelle are bordered by woods. The east and south sides are bordered by residences and grassland.

Lake Rochelle has public access on its northwest shore. The Lake Rochelle Park and Boat Ramp, maintained by the city of Lake Alfred, are there; the boat ramp is a part of the 1.8-acre (7,300 m^{2}) park. The park has a shelter house covering a picnic table. On the west side of the lake, the Chain of Lakes Trail, a paved walking and bicycle trail, runs from Joyce B. Davis Park in downtown Winter Haven and stops at US Highway 92. This lake is one of the lakes in the north part of the Winter Haven Chain of Lakes. Boats may enter Lake Rochelle from two canals. One, no the north side, connects to Lake Haines. One on the south side connects to Lake Conine. A small canal on the northeast connects to Lake Echo, but this canal cannot be navigated by boat. There are no public swimming beaches on Lake Rochelle.

The Take Me Fishing website says Lake Rochelle contains largemouth bass and bluegill.
