= Hamilton Lake (Alberta) =

- Location within Alberta
- Location: Alberta, Canada
- Coordinates: 54.0694444°N 111.9561111°W
- Type: Lake

Hamilton Lake is a lake in Alberta, Canada.

Hamilton Lake has the name of E. H. Hamilton, a government surveyor.

== See also ==
- List of lakes of Alberta
