= Middle Lake Hamilton =

- Location within Florida
- Location: northeast edge of Winter Haven, Florida
- Coordinates: 28.0697°N 81.6479°W
- Type: natural freshwater lake
- Basin countries: United States
- Max. length: 2,850 feet (870 m)
- Max. width: 1,975 feet (602 m)
- Surface area: 103 acres (42 ha)
- Surface elevation: 121 feet (37 m)

Middle Lake Hamilton, is a natural freshwater lake on the northeast edge of Winter Haven, Florida. At one point on the north shore the Winter Haven city limits touches the lake's shore. This lake has an 103-acre (420,000 m^{2}) surface area. Middle Lake Hamilton is between two other lakes with Hamilton in their names, Lake Hamilton (Florida) and Little Lake Hamilton. Ironically, Middle Lake Hamilton is considerably smaller than Little Lake Hamilton. Much of Middle Lake Hamilton's north and northwest shore is bordered by a residential area, which is partly inside Winter Haven. The northeast shore is bordered by woods. The entire shore from the southeast around to the southwest is bordered by the Lake Region Mobile Home Park.

The public has no access to the shores of this lake. Middle Lake Hamilton is part of the north system of the Winter Haven Chain of Lakes. It is directly connected by canal to connected by canal on its west side to Lake Hamilton (Florida) and on its west side to Little Lake Hamilton. However, for a number of years the water level in the canal to Little Lake Hamilton was so low or even nonexistent that it was impossible to get to Little Lake Hamilton by boat. Boats can easily navigate the canal leading from Lake Hamilton. As there is no shore access to this lake, there are no public swimming areas or boat ramps on this lake's shore. The TakeMeFishing.Org website says this lake contains largemouth bass and bluegill.
