= Lake Howard (Winter Haven, Florida) =

- Location within Florida Location within the United States
- Location: Winter Haven, Florida
- Coordinates: 28°1′26.34″N 81°44′38.58″W
- Type: Natural Freshwater Lake
- Part of: Chain of Lakes (Winter Haven), Peace River - Peace Creek Canal Watershed
- Primary outflows: Peace River
- Catchment area: 1,239 acres (5.01 km^{2})
- Basin countries: United States
- Max. length: 1.25 miles (2.01 km)
- Max. width: 1.03 miles (1.66 km)
- Surface area: 624 acres (253 ha)
- Average depth: 10.9 feet (3.3 m)
- Max. depth: 18.7 feet (5.7 m)
- Water volume: 2,270,506,840 US gallons (8.5948033×10^{9} L) gallons
- Surface elevation: 131 feet (40 m)
- Settlements: Winter Haven, Florida

Lake Howard is a freshwater lake, located in Winter Haven, Florida. The lake is part of the headwaters of the Peace River watershed. Lake Howard is a prominent lake in Winter Haven's Chain of Lakes. Lake Howard is on the southern chain of lakes. It is connected to Lake Cannon, to the north-west, and Lake May, to the south-east. Lake Howard has a surface area of 624 acres. It has a mean depth of 10.9 feet (3.3 m), and maximum depth of 18.7 feet (5.7 m).

== History ==
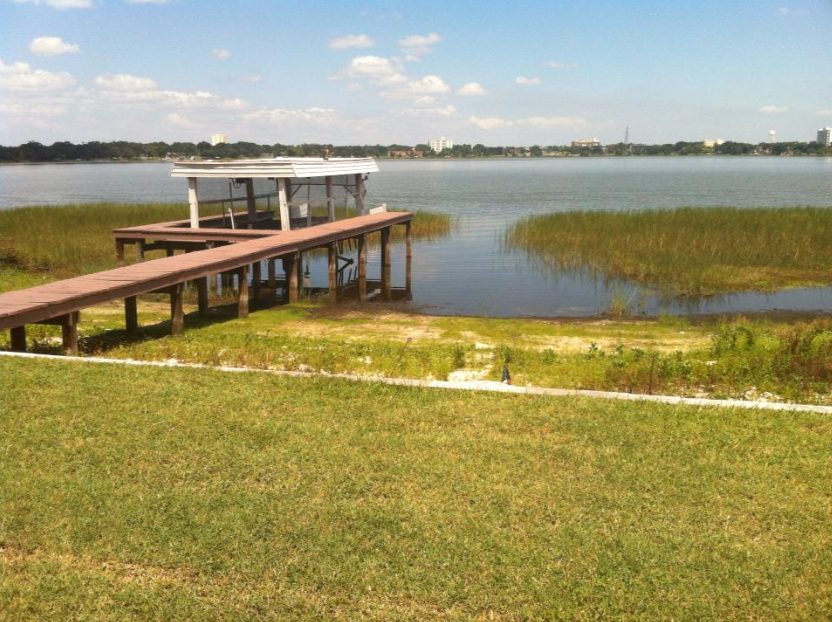
View of Lake Howard.

The Calusa were the first known people to live along this lake. The Seminole were later known to live and hunt along the lake. Lake Howard was first surveyed by Dr. John Westcott in 1849. He named the lake for his neighbors in Madison County, Florida, the Howard family. The lake, with its current name, appears in the first United States government maps of the area, published in 1854.

Lake Howard became one of the first areas to be settled by newly arriving American and European settlers. Some of the oldest homes in the city of Winter Haven are located on the shores of Lake Howard. Beymer Memorial United Methodist Church, located on the north-east side of the lake, is one of the oldest buildings in Winter Haven. On the north side of Lake Howard is the residential neighborhood of Interlaken. This neighborhood is a designated U.S. Historic District, with over 50 homes on the National Register of Historic Places.

== Water quality ==
By the late 1960s, Lake Howard started to become polluted. The single biggest problem was that over-flow capacity lines for the Jan Phyll Village Waste Water Treatment Facility, which fed directly into Lake Howard. This meant that raw sewage was periodically sent directly into the lake. This problem was corrected in 1977, when the waste facility was re-designed.

In 1980, an important restoration study was done on Lake Howard to improve the water quality. Over the preceding years, many other major scientific studies were conducted on Lake Howard, often building upon work done in previous studies. In 1995, Dr T.J. Whitmore conducted a major paleolimnological study on Lake Howard. By examining sediment core samples, he was able to evaluate historical changes in water levels and water quality in Lake Howard.

Today, through conservation and restoration efforts, by the city, state, and federal government, the water quality of Lake Howard continues to improve. However, rapid urbanization around the lake threatens its future health.

=== Water quality regulations ===
Lake Howard is an impaired waterbody according to Florida Department of Environmental Protection's Impaired Water Rules but was delisted in 2025 as a result of the adoption of aTotal Maximum Daily Load (TMDL) for Biology, Chlorophyll-a, and Total Nitrogen. Phosphorus is the limiting nutrient.

According to the Lake Vegetation Index (LVI), an assessment created by FDEP which compares the lake's aquatic plant communities to a reference lake with minimal human impacts, Lake Howard has been categorized as "healthy" in 2020, 2022, and 2024. The only year of record where the lake was categorized as "impaired" was in 2014.

== Wildlife habitat ==
Great blue heron, green heron, great egret, snowy egret, osprey, grackle, limpkin, and red-winged blackbird are a few of the many bird species regularly seen on the lake. Bald eagles are occasionally seen on the Lake. The lake supports a healthy population of alligators and other reptiles and amphibians. Lake Howard is also known as a world class location with freshwater fishing, particularly for large mouth bass and bluegill.

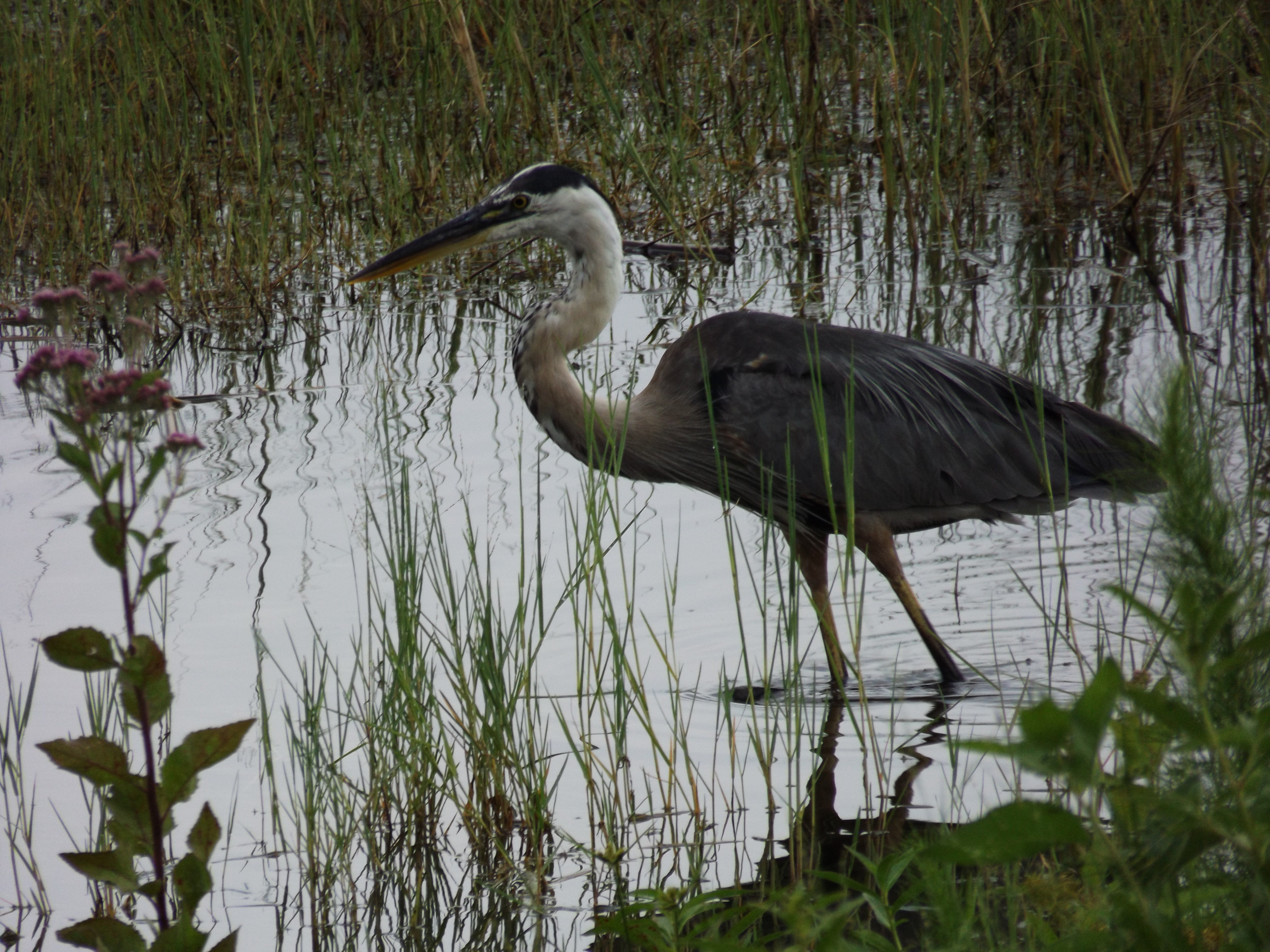
Great Blue Heron on the shore of Lake Howard.

== Nearby locations ==
Lake Howard is situated relatively close to the downtown area of Winter Haven. Lake Howard Drive, which circles the lake, is a busy thoroughfare in the city. The lake is surrounded by both residential and commercial properties. There are two public boats ramps which can be used to access the lake. The Lake Howard Boat Ramp West is located at the corner of Lake Howard Drive and Avenue B NW, and has a boat ramp and a fishing pier. Lake Howard Boat Ramp East is located at the corner of Lake Howard Drive and West Central Avenue, and has a boat ramp, fishing pier, parking area, and picnic area.

=== South Lake Howard Nature Park ===
South Lake Howard Nature Park is located on the south-west side of Lake Howard. The park was first constructed in 2001 as a wetland treatment area to capture and improve the water quality of stormwater before it entered Lake Howard. It was the city's first major green infrastructure project to address water quality and infrastructure issues and provide a community recreation area.

The park has multi-use trails, picnic areas, and restrooms. There are also multiple wooden boardwalks running over the wetlands and over Lake Howard (across the street), which provide a good vantage point for observing local wildlife and fishing.

The Chain of Lakes Trail, a paved multi-use hiking and biking trail, begins here.

In 2026, the City of Winter Haven embarked on an expansion of the park. The expansion includes additional boardwalks through a shaded wetland dominated by red maple and cypress trees. Additional features like a small playground, outdoor classroom space, fishing areas, and additional parking were also added. One standout feature of the 2026 expansion is the City of Winter Haven's disc golf course. Portions of the expansion are still under construction and are not yet open to the public.
