= Lake Shipp =

- Location within Florida
- Location: Winter Haven, Florida
- Coordinates: 28.0039°N 81.7423°W
- Type: natural freshwater lake
- Basin countries: United States
- Max. length: 4,000 feet (1,200 m)
- Max. width: 3,855 feet (1,175 m)
- Surface area: 276 acres (112 ha)
- Surface elevation: 131 feet (40 m)

Lake Shipp is located on the Chain of Lakes in Winter Haven, Florida. Round in shape, it is a natural freshwater lake with a 276-acre (1,120,000 m^{2}) surface area. The lake is bordered on the north, northwest and the southwest sides by residential areas. On the east and part of the southeast are warehouses and business buildings. William G. Roe Park is on the southeast shore and Sertoma Park, officially called Lake Shipp Park, is on the west side of Lake Shipp.

The provide access to portions of the shore of the lake, but there are no public swimming areas. Lake Shipp Park, also known as Sertoma Park, is along much of the west side of Lake Shipp. This park has four shelterhouses, thirteen picnic tables, five baseball fields, two soccer fields, a playground, a boat ramp, canoe access to the lake and fishing access. The other park, William G. Roe Park, is on the southwest side of the lake. This park has a large boat launching area. Also, boaters can use two canals leaving Lake Shipp to access other area lakes. The canal to the south meanders for miles to the south and southwest.

The Hook and Bullet site says Lake Shipp has the following fishes: pumpkinseed, channel catfish, bullhead, bluegill, redear sunfish, largemouth bass, redbreast sunfish.
