= Lake Hamilton (Florida) =

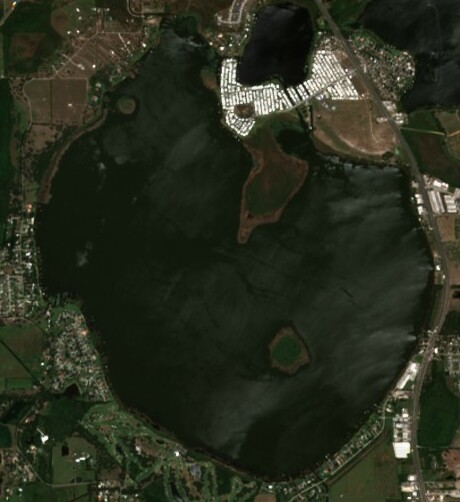
- Lake Hamilton with Middle Lake Hamilton at the top.

- Location within Florida Location within the United States
- Location: northeast edge of Winter Haven, Florida, and city of Lake Hamilton
- Coordinates: 28.0528°N 81.6548°W
- Type: natural freshwater lake
- Primary outflows: 2
- Basin countries: United States
- Max. length: 2.65 miles (4.26 km)
- Max. width: 2.14 miles (3.44 km)
- Surface area: 2,184 acres (884 ha)
- Average depth: 7.2 feet (2.2 m)
- Max. depth: 23.4 feet (7.1 m)
- Water volume: 5,815,439,051 US gallons (2.201383151×10^{10} L)
- Surface elevation: 121 feet (37 m)
- Islands: 1 peninsula Island one original Island another small island and possibly a fourth island

Lake Hamilton is somewhat round with a large cove at its northwest edge. It also has a peninsula, sometimes called Bonars Island, on its north side that juts about 2,000 feet (610 m) south into the lake. During times of high water levels this peninsula becomes a large island. Lake Hamilton has a surface area of 2,184-acre (8,840,000 m^{2}). One large island is in the south-central part of the lake; it measures 1,410 feet (430 m) long by 1,060 feet (320 m) wide. Another large island is near the northeast shore of Lake Hamilton; it measures 825 feet (251 m) long by 470 feet (140 m) wide. At least two small islands are also within Lake Hamilton.

Lake Hamilton is one of the largest lakes in the Winter Haven area. Parts of its shoreline are surrounded by residential areas. The lake has a mobile home park on its northeast shore. A golf course borders the lake along all the southwest shore and US Highway 27 runs close to the lake along much of its east shore. A swamp borders the lake at the north end of the cove.

The public has limited access to the shores of this lake. The only public access is at Sample Park, along US 27. This park has a picnic area and a public boat ramp. There are no public swimming areas at Lake Hamilton. Lake Hamilton is part of the north system of the Winter Haven Chain of Lakes. It is connected by a boat lift, which is not currently functioning, in a canal on its west side to Lake Fannie, on its north side to Lake Henry and on its east side to Middle Lake Hamilton. The TakeMeFishing.Org website does not specifically say anything about the fish in this lake. It says The chain of lakes of which it is a part contain largemouth bass, black crappie and bluegill.
