= List of Superstars competitors =

The following lists sportspeople who have competed in Superstars competitions over the years by the competition they competed in. Franco Harris

== Britain ==
=== Female ===
- Zoë Baker
- Lesley McKenna
- Shelley Rudman

=== Male ===
- Alain Baxter
- Jonah Barrington
- Dave Boy Green
- Robin Brew
- Stan Bowles
- John Conteh
- Garry Cook
- Tim Crooks
- Lynn Davies
- Keith Fielding
- David Hemery
- Brian Hooper
- James Hunt
- Brian Jacks
- Kevin Keegan
- Roger Kingdom
- Du'aine Ladejo
- Malcolm Macdonald
- Wayne McCullough
- Andy Ripley
- John Sherwood
- Stuart Matthews (surfer)

== Canada ==
- Brian Budd
- Gaetan Boucher
- Yvan Cournoyer
- Tony Gabriel
- Rod Gilbert
- Bob Nystrom
- Lanny McDonald
- Travis Moore
- Darryl Sittler

== Europe ==
- Kjell Isaksson
- Brian Jacks
- Jean-Claude Killy
- Ties Kruize
- Ingemar Stenmark
- Ivo Van Damme

== Ireland ==
- Alan Bates
- Bernard Brogan
- Eamonn Coghlan
- Declan Burns
- Gerry Loftus
- Pat Spillane
- David O'Leary

== Sweden ==
- Thomas Ahlsgard
- Ingemar Stenmark
- Mattias Sunneborn

== United States ==
=== Female ===
- Lynn Conkwright
- Carla Dunlap
- Linda Fernandez
- Anne Henning
- Nancy Lieberman
- Ann Meyers
- Mary Jo Peppler

=== Male ===
- Johnny Bench
- Jeremy Bloom
- Bill Buckner
- Ron Cey
- Vince Coleman
- Joe Frazier
- Steve Garvey
- Mark Gastineau
- Willie Gault
- Wayne Grimditch
- Kelly Gruber
- Elvin Hayes
- Dave Johnson
- Dave Kingman
- Ron LeFlore
- Hermann Maier
- Bode Miller
- Renaldo Nehemiah
- Tom Petranoff
- Mike Powell
- Greg Pruitt
- Peter Revson
- Pete Rose
- Kyle Rote, Jr.
- Mike Schmidt
- Bob Seagren
- Jason Sehorn
- O. J. Simpson
- Tom Sneva
- Jim Stefanich
- Lynn Swann
- Johnny Unitas
- Herschel Walker
- Charles White
- Reggie White
