= List of members of the Water Ski Hall of Fame =

USA Water Ski created a hall of fame in 1982. It is now part of the Water Ski Experience Hall of Fame and Museum in Polk City, Florida.

== 1980s ==
1982

- Willa Cook, DeLeon Springs, Florida, Hall of Fame Induction Entry
- Ralph Samuelson, deceased, Hall of Fame Induction Entry
- Dick Pope Sr., deceased,
- Chuck Stearns, Huntington Beach, California, Hall of Fame Induction Entry
- Dan B. Hains, deceased, Hall of Fame Induction Entry
- Charles R. Sligh, deceased, Hall of Fame Induction Entry
- Liz Allan Reid, Godfrey, Illinois, Hall of Fame Induction Entry

1983

- Jack Anderson, Hewitt, New Jersey, Hall of Fame Induction Entry
- Pruce Parker, deceased, Hall of Fame Induction Entry
- Leland G. Sutherland, deceased, Hall of Fame Induction Entry
- William P Barlow, deceased, Hall of Fame Induction Entry
- Don Ibsen, deceased, Hall of Fame Induction Entry

1984

- Charles Tilgner, deceased, Hall of Fame Induction Entry
- Fred Wiley, deceased, Hall of Fame Induction Entry
- Warren Witherell, deceased, Bolton Landing, New York, Hall of Fame Induction Entry

1986

- Wayne Grimditch, Lighthouse Point, Florida, Hall of Fame Induction Entry
- Barbara Cooper Heddon, Haines City, Florida, Hall of Fame Induction Entry

1987

- Mike Suyderhoud, Redding, California, Hall of Fame Induction Entry
- Joe Cash, deceased, Hall of Fame Induction Entry

1988

- Ricky McCormick, Winter Haven, Florida, Hall of Fame Induction Entry

1989

- William D. Clifford, deceased, Hall of Fame Induction Entry
- Dick Pope Jr., deceased, Winter Haven, Florida, Hall of Fame Induction Entry

== 1990s ==
1990

- Jack Walker, N. Miami Beach, Florida, Hall of Fame Induction Entry

1991

- Linda Leavengood Giddens, Eastman, Georgia, Hall of Fame Induction Entry
- George Blair, Winter Haven, Florida, Hall of Fame Induction Entry

1992

- Stew McDonald, deceased,
- Nancie Rideout Robertson, deceased, Hall of Fame Induction Entry

1993

- William P. Barlow Jr., Oakland, California, Hall of Fame Induction Entry
- Tommy Bartlett, deceased, Hall of Fame Induction Entry
- Cindy Todd, Pierson, Florida, Hall of Fame Induction Entry

1994

- Al Tyll, Boynton Beach, Florida, Hall of Fame Induction Entry
- Karin Roberge Woodson, Melbourne, Florida, Hall of Fame Induction Entry

1995

- Lisa St. John, Orlando, Florida, Hall of Fame Induction Entry
- Larry Penacho, Jamul, California, Hall of Fame Induction Entry

1996

- Skip Gilkerson, Maryville, Tennessee Hall of Fame Induction Entry

1997

- C.W. Lowe, Winter Haven, Florida Hall of Fame Induction Entry
- Carole Lowe, Winter Haven, Florida, Hall of Fame Induction Entry

1998

- Mike Osborn, Winter Haven, Florida, Hall of Fame Induction Entry
- Alan Kempton, Tampa, Florida, Hall of Fame Induction Entry

1999

- Lori Powell-Drell, Cummings, Georgia, Hall of Fame Induction Entry
- Jeffry Armstrong, Grenada, Mississippi, Hall of Fame Induction Entry

== 2000s ==
2000

- Deena Brush Mapple, Orlando, Florida, Hall of Fame Induction Entry
- Mike Seipel, Atlantis, Florida, Hall of Fame Induction Entry

2001

- Sammy Duvall, Orlando, Florida, Hall of Fame Induction Entry

2002

- Mike Avila, Pacifica, California, Hall of Fame Induction Entry
- Jennifer Calleri-Schwenk, Winter Haven, Florida, Hall of Fame Induction Entry

2003

- Camille Duvall-Hero, New York City, Hall of Fame Induction Entry

2004

- Tory Baggiano, Alexandria, Virginia, Hall of Fame Induction Entry

2005

- Dave Reinhart, Defiance, Ohio, Hall of Fame Induction Entry

2006

- Bob LaPoint, Truckee, CA, Hall of Fame Induction Entry
- Carl Roberge, Montreal, Quebec, Canada, Hall of Fame Induction Entry

2007

- Scotty Clack, Winter Haven, FL, Hall of Fame Induction Entry
- Britt Larsen-Kovak, Cambridge, Ontario, Hall of Fame Induction Entry
- Tawn Larsen-Hahn, Southport, CT, Hall of Fame Induction Entry

2008

- Marsha Fitzgerald, Concord, NC, Hall of Fame Induction Entry
- Kris LaPoint, Orlando, FL, Hall of Fame Induction Entry

2009

- Lucky Lowe, Lake Alfred, FL, Hall of Fame Induction Entry
- Lynn Novakofski, Winter Haven, FL, Hall of Fame Induction Entry

2010

- Darin Shapiro, Orlando, FL, Hall of Fame Induction Entry

2011

- Debbie Nordblad, Long Beach, California, Hall of Fame Induction Entry
- Ron Scarpa, Winter Haven, FL, Hall of Fame Induction Entry

2012

- Sherri Slone, Hays, KS, Hall of Fame Induction Entry
- Wade Cox, Orlando, FL, Hall of Fame Induction Entry

2013

- Cory Pickos, Santa Rosa Beach, FL, Hall of Fame Induction Entry
- Jim Grew, Hall of Fame Induction Entry
- Kristi Overton-Johnson, Keystone Heights, FL, Hall of Fame Induction Entry

2014

- Cheryl Orloff, Hall of Fame Induction Entry

2015

- Bill Bowness, Hall of Fame Induction Entry
- Jennifer Leachman LaPoint, Windermere, FL, Hall of Fame Induction Entry
- Kim Laskoff, Orlando, FL, Hall of Fame Induction Entry
- Jeff Rodgers

2016

- Cathy & Gerry Luiting
- Lori Dunsmore
- Martie Wells
- William Farrell

2017

- Brenda Nichols Baldwin
- Rachel George Normand

2018

- Rhoni Barton Bischoff

2019

- Don Mixon
- Parks Bonifay

== 2020s ==
2020

- Joe Ray
- Mandy Nightingale
- Shaun Murray

2021

- N/A

2022

- Tara Hamilton Wynne
- Zane Schwenk

2023

- Jimmy Siemers
- Keith St. Onge

2024

- Elaine Heller Fatla

2025

- Scot Ellis

2026

- Freddy Krueger
