= Joe Cash =

American water skier (1937–1967)

George Joseph Cash (25 May 1937 – 13 July 1967) was an American professional water skier. During his career Cash won four Masters, three U.S. Nationals, and two World Championships.

== Biography ==
Joe Cash was born on May 25, 1937, to James and Clara Cash in Shelbyville, TN. His family moved to Sarasota, FL in 1946, which happened to be a popular spot for waterskiing. He did not begin waterskiing until his parents bought him his first pair of skis for his 17th birthday, but within three years, he was competing in national and world championships. Cash got his first job when he joined the ski show at Sunshine Springs and Gardens near Sarasota. He moved on to become a star performer in the Cypress Gardens show, while simultaneously piling up tournament trophies.

== Professional career ==
Cash was known in his time as the only skier in the history of the sport to set records in all three disciplines – slalom, jump, and trick – though at the time, only records in the jump were officially recognized. Cash tied the record for the jump with a 126-footer at the 1957 Nationals in San Diego. He set the record at 129 feet in 1958 at Delray Beach, FL, and raised the mark weeks later to 136 feet at the Callaway Gardens Nationals. In 1959, he again raised the mark by 10 feet to 142 in Fort Myers, FL.

Cash injured his knee during a jump at the 1959 Nationals in Laconia, NH, ending his jumping career, though Cash would continue to compete in the slalom and the trick. His increased focus on those events seemed to pay off with Masters slalom titles in 1960 and 1962 and a second place finish in trick at the Masters in 1963, close behind Al Tyll, acknowledged as the world's best in his specialty who won four consecutive National Championships in the trick from 1962 through 1965. Cash won the Masters trick title in 1964.

Joe Cash is also known for inventing the deepwater start, a technique in Barefoot skiing in which the skier begins in the water with no skis. He accomplished this in 1958.

== Coaching ==
Even in the middle of his own championship career at a very young age, Cash taught a number of future champion skiers at his school in Sarasota. Three of the six members of the 1963 U.S. Team – Billy Spencer, Jeannette Brown, Dicksie Ann Hoyt, Johnny Blackburn – were students of Cash. Spencer and Brown won the overall titles at the World Championships that year in Vichy, France.

== Death ==
On July 13, 1967, Joe Cash was making last-minute preparations to leave for Callaway Gardens and the Masters tournament, in which a number of his students were competing. He had been to every Masters since becoming the Overall Champion at the inaugural event in 1959, either as a contestant or spectator. On his way, his car collided with a train in Sarasota, ending his life. He was 30 years old.

Bo Callaway immediately instituted a slalom trophy in Cash's memory to be awarded each year for the best slalom performance in the Masters. Guillermo Garcia, a friend whose son Cash had trained at their country place on Lake Tequesquitengo near Mexico City, named the Joe Cash Memorial Invitational Tournament in his honor, which quickly became a popular midwinter competition at the Mexican resort.

At the time of his death, Joe left behind his wife, Ida Mae Messer Cash and 5 children, Gabriel, Katrina, Karen, Kristal and Kelly.

== Tournament results ==
- 1957 National Jump Champion
- 1957 World Slalom Champion
- 1957 World Jump Runner-up
- 1957 World Overall Champion
- 1958 National Jump Champion
- 1959 Masters Overall Champion
- 1960 Masters Slalom Champion
- 1962 Masters Slalom Champion
- 1963 Masters Trick Runner-up
- 1964 Masters Trick Champion

== See also ==
- Waterskiing
- Barefoot skiing
- World water skiing champions
- Masters Waterski and Wakeboard Tournament
- List of Water Skiing Hall of Fame Inductees
- USA Water Ski
- United States Waterskiing Team
