= Nancie Rideout =

American professional water skier

Nancie Rideout Robertson (12 May 1938 – 21 January 1996) was an American professional water skier. During her competitive career, Rideout won the inaugural Masters and two World Championships in jump.

== Biography ==
Rideout was born in Jackson, Michigan, and moved to Orlando, Florida at the age of 4. She started skiing after her father bought an outboard boat which came with a pair of water skis. Rideout's talents were noticed by Tommy Barlett, who added her as part of his traveling water ski show in 1955. The following year, she became a regular performer at Cypress Gardens. While performing in ski shows, Rideout was also exposed to competitive water skiing and became a prolific competitor. Notoriously a jumper, she won her first-ever jump tournament at the 1957 Dixie. In the same year, she also won the 1957 World Championships in jump. In 1958, Rideout dominated the field by winning all three events in every tournament she entered. One of these events, the U.S. Nationals, saw her break the jump world record with 89 feet. This was the third time in one year in which she broke her own world record. In 1959, Rideout reached another peak in her career by defending her world jump title in Milan and winning the inaugural U.S. Masters overall. She retired from competitive skiing after the spring of 1960.

== See also ==
- List of Water Skiing Hall of Fame Inductees
- Masters Waterski and Wakeboard Tournament
- Waterskiing
- World water skiing champions
