= List of 1985 World Games medal winners =

World Games medalists list

The 1985 World Games were held in London, Great Britain, from July 25 to August 4, 1985.

== Archery ==
Event	Gold	Silver	Bronze
Men's field recurve	Göran Bjerendal; Sweden	Francis Notenboom; Belgium	Tommy Quick; Sweden
Men's field bare	Anders Rosenberg; Sweden	Roy Mundon; Great Britain	Philip Bowen; Great Britain
Women's field recurve	Lisa Buscombe; Italy	Sandra Thompson; Australia	Reinhild Weinlich; West Germany
Women's field bare	Kornelia Fili; Austria	Giuseppina Meini; Italy	Lavinia Bottazzi; Italy

== Bodybuilding ==
Event	Gold	Silver	Bronze
Men's -65 kg	Hermann Hoffend; West Germany	Steve Davis; United States	Calvin Nyuli; Canada
Men's -70 kg	Sean Jenkins; United States	El-Shahat Mabrouk; Egypt	Ian Dowe; Great Britain
Men's -80 kg	David Hawk; United States	Angelito Lesta; Great Britain	Michel Devitis; France
Men's +80 kg	Berry de Mey; Netherlands	Matt Mendenhall; United States	Olev Annus; Finland
Women's -52 kg	Donna Oliveira; United States	Renate Holland; West Germany	Donna Lea; Canada
Women's +52 kg	Chris Wesenberg; Canada	Dominique Darde; France	Hildegard Schäffer; West Germany

== Bowling ==
Event	Gold	Silver	Bronze
Men's tenpin singles	Raymond Jansson; Sweden	Arne Strøm; Norway	Utz Dehler; West Germany
Men's tenpin all-events	Raymond Jansson; Sweden	Utz Dehler; West Germany	Byun Yong-Hwon; South Korea
Women's tenpin singles	Adelene Wee; Singapore	Pamela Pope; Australia	Jette Hansen; Denmark
Women's tenpin all-events	Gisela Lins; West Germany	Josette Romon; Switzerland	Pamela Pope; Australia
Mixed tenpin pairs	Nora Haveneers; Dominique de Nolf; Belgium	Gisela Lins; Utz Dehler; West Germany	Olivia García; René Reyes; Philippines

== Casting ==
Event	Gold	Silver	Bronze
Men's fly accuracy	Ola Spang; Sweden	Steve Rajeff; United States	Chris Korich; United States
Men's fly distance single handed	Steve Rajeff; United States	Hywell Morgan; Great Britain	Øyvind Førland; Norway
Men's spinning accuracy	Øyvind Førland; Norway	Ulf Janson; Sweden	Chris Korich; United States
Men's spinning accuracy single handed	Freddy Grüniger; Switzerland	Øyvind Førland; Norway	Ørnulf Hegge; Norway
Men's spinning distance single handed	Freddy Grüniger; Switzerland	Øyvind Førland; Norway	Ørnulf Hegge; Norway
Men's fly distance double handed	Steve Rajeff; United States	Øyvind Førland; Norway	Peter Hässig; Switzerland
Men's spinning distance double handed	Martin Dirks; West Germany	Ørnulf Hegge; Norway	Øyvind Førland; Norway
Men's multiplier accuracy	Øyvind Førland; Norway	Steve Rajeff; United States	Ørnulf Hegge; Norway
Women's fly accuracy	Lise-Lotte Kristiansson; Sweden	Bente Skyrud; Norway	Annika Christersson; Sweden
Women's fly distance single handed	Annika Christersson; Sweden	Lise-Lotte Kristiansson; Sweden	Ursula Veltrup; West Germany
Women's spinning accuracy	Lise-Lotte Kristiansson; Sweden	Annika Christersson; Sweden	Bente Skyrud; Norway
Women's spinning distance single handed	Lise-Lotte Kristiansson; Sweden	Annika Christersson; Sweden	Ursula Veltrup; West Germany
Women's multiplier accuracy	Annika Christersson; Sweden	Brenda MacSporran; Canada	Ursula Veltrup; West Germany

== Finswimming ==
Event	Gold	Silver	Bronze
Men's 100 m	Jürgen Kolenda; West Germany	Fabio Bettazzoni; Italy	Christian Molenaar; West Germany
Men's 200 m	Jürgen Kolenda; West Germany	Giuseppe Galantucci; Italy	Fabio Bettazzoni; Italy
Men's 400 m	Jürgen Kolenda; West Germany	Valter Olander; Sweden	Carsten Bertram; West Germany
Men's 800 m	Paolo Vandini; Italy	Valter Olander; Sweden	Sylvain Florio; France
Men's 1500 m	Paolo Vandini; Italy	Valter Olander; Sweden	István Kubina; Hungary
Men's 4 × 100 m relay	— West Germany	— Italy	— France
Men's 4 × 200 m relay	— West Germany	— France	— Sweden
Men's 50 m apnea	Jürgen Kolenda; West Germany	Christian Molenaar; West Germany	Fabio Bettazzoni; Italy
Men's 100 m immersion	Jürgen Kolenda; West Germany	Fabio Bettazzoni; Italy	Gyula Gurisatti; Hungary
Men's 400 m immersion	Frank Clemens; West Germany	Sylvain Florio; Italy	Gyula Gurisatti; Hungary
Women's 100 m	Emanuela Imperatori; Italy	Barbara Nanni; Italy	Eva Fabo; Hungary
Women's 200 m	Eva Fabo; Hungary	Monica Crovetti; Italy	Barbara Nanni; Italy
Women's 400 m	Eva Fabo; Hungary	Edit Ginczinger; Hungary	Monica Crovetti; Italy
Women's 800 m	Monica Crovetti; Italy	Eva Fabo; Hungary	Edit Ginczinger; Hungary
Women's 50 m apnea	Anne Gourmoux; France	Katalin Toth; Hungary	Emanuela Imperatori; Italy
Women's 100 m immersion	Ildiko Magyar; Hungary	Katalin Toth; Hungary	Emanuela Imperatori; Italy
Women's 400 m immersion	Katalin Toth; Hungary	Ildiko Magyar; Hungary	Pascale Schaederle; Italy

== Fistball ==
Event	Gold	Silver	Bronze
Men's	West Germany	Austria	Switzerland

== Inline speed skating ==
Event	Gold	Silver	Bronze
Men's track 300 m time trial	Patrizio Sarto; Italy	Scott Constantine; New Zealand	Donald van Patten; United States
Men's track 1500 m	Giuseppe de Persio; Italy	Massimo Mussi; Italy	Kevin Webb; Australia
Men's track 10000 m	Robert Kaiser; United States	Donald van Patten; United States	Hernando Montano; Colombia
Men's road 5000 m	Donald van Patten; United States	Robert Kaiser; United States	Anthony Keefe; United States
Men's road 10000 m	Robert Kaiser; United States	Massimo Muzzi; Italy	Danny van Deperre; Belgium
Men's road 20000 m	Donald van Patten; United States	Jean van Hoornweder; Belgium	Danny van Deperre; Belgium
Women's track 300 m time trial	Stefania Ghermandi; Italy	Darlene Kessinger; United States	Beth Tucker; United States
Women's track 1500 m	Laura Perinti; Italy	Monica Lucchese; Italy	Annie Lambrechts; Belgium
Women's track 5000 m	Laura Perinti; Italy	Marisa Canafoglia; Italy	Monica Lucchese; Italy
Women's road 3000 m	Stefania Ghermandi; Italy	Laura Perinti; Italy	Ann Bloomfield; Australia
Women's road 5000 m	Marisa Canafoglia; Italy	Stefania Ghermandi; Italy	Ann van Hoornweder; Belgium
Women's road 10000 m	Monica Lucchese; Italy	Marisa Canafoglia; Italy	Stefania Ghermandi; Italy

== Karate ==
Event	Gold	Silver	Bronze
Men's kata	Tsuguo Sakamoto; Japan	Masashi Koyama; Japan	Julio Martinez; United States
Men's kumite -60 kg	Sinichi Hasegawa; Japan	Ino Alberto; Great Britain	Jean-Louis Granet; France; Abdu Shaher; Great Britain
Men's kumite -65 kg	Roel van Loen; Netherlands	Arno Lund; Norway	Ignacio Lugo; Mexico; Ramon Malawe; Sweden
Men's kumite -70 kg	Cecil Hackett; Great Britain	Jim Collins; Great Britain	Kyo Hayashi; Japan; Thierry Masci; France
Men's kumite -75 kg	Yorihisa Uchida; Japan	Serge Serfati; Italy	Dale Beam; United States; Didier Moreau; France
Men's kumite -80 kg	Gianluca Guazzaroni; Italy	Pierre Pinar; France	Arild Engh; Norway; Mervyne Etienne; Great Britain
Men's kumite +80 kg	Jeff Thompson; Great Britain	Leslie Jensen; Sweden	Karl Daggfeldt; Sweden; Massimo di Luigi; Italy
Men's kumite open	Vic Charles; Great Britain	Emmanuel Pinda; France	Arild Engh; Norway
Women's kata	Mie Nakayama; Japan	Chu Meyyueh; Chinese Taipei	Stesuko Tajima; Japan
Women's kumite -53 kg	Cathérine Girardet; France	Li Yan; Chinese Taipei	Alba Howard; United States; C. Sequara; Venezuela
Women's kumite -60 kg	Beverly Morris; Great Britain	G. Black; United States	Angelika Forster; West Germany; Wang Kueiyang; Chinese Taipei
Women's kumite +60 kg	Janice Argyle; Great Britain	Rosa Maria Ghidotti; Italy	Yvette Bryan; Great Britain; Stirre Nygaard; Norway

== Korfball ==
Event	Gold	Silver	Bronze
Mixed	Netherlands	Belgium	United States

== Life saving ==
Event	Gold	Silver	Bronze
Men's 200 m obstacle swim	Roberto Bonnani; Italy	Manfred Köder; West Germany	Miguel Cruz; Spain
Men's 50 m manikin carry	Roberto Bonnani; Italy	Mauro Bertolini; Italy	Massimiliano Tramontana; Italy
Men's 100 m rescue medley	Mauro Bertolini; Italy	Francesco Sennis; Italy	Roberto Bonnani; Italy
Men's 100 m manikin carry with fins	Roberto Bonnani; Italy	Francesco Sennis; Italy	Frank Regel; West Germany
Men's 4 x 50 m medley relay	— Italy	— West Germany	— Spain
Men's tetrathlon	Roberto Bonnani; Italy	Francesco Sennis; Italy	Hans Kwaks; Netherlands
Women's 200 m obstacle swim	Angela Cantelli; Italy	Francisca Romero; Spain	Cristina Furlan; Italy
Women's 50 m manikin carry	Monica Negro; Italy	Cristina Bartocci; Italy	Angela Cantelli; Italy
Women's 100 m rescue medley	Monica Negro; Italy	Angela Cantelli; Italy	Jutta Ramisch; West Germany
Women's 100 m manikin carry with fins	Concepción Escattlar; Spain	Jutta Ramisch; West Germany	Cristina Furlan; Italy
Men's 4 x 50 m medley relay	— Italy	— Spain	— West Germany
Men's tetrathlon	Angela Cantelli; Italy	Monica Negro; Italy	Cristina Bartocci; Italy

== Netball ==
Event	Gold	Silver	Bronze
Women's	New Zealand	Australia	Jamaica

== Petanque ==
Event	Gold	Silver	Bronze
Men's triples	— France	— Italy	— Monaco

== Racquetball ==
Event	Gold	Silver	Bronze
Men's triples	Andy Roberts; United States	Roger Harripersad; Canada	Ed Andrews; United States
Men's triples	Cindy Baxter; United States	Carol Dupuy; Canada	Crystal Fried; Canada

== Roller figure skating ==
Event	Gold	Silver	Bronze
Men's freeskating	Scott Cohen; United States	Michele Biserni; United States	Bryan Denney; United States
Women's freeskating	Tina Kneisley; United States	Rafaella del Vinaccio; Italy	Elena Bonati; Italy
Pairs	Robyn Young; Ken Benson; United States	Cathy Hayduk; Mark Pollard; United States	Anette Munzing; Michael Seeger; West Germany
Dance	Anna Danks; Scott Myers; United States	Andrea Steudte; Martin Hauss; West Germany	Jeannie Parks; Rob Galambos; United States

== Roller hockey ==
Event	Gold	Silver	Bronze
Men's freeskating	Italy	United States	Portugal

== Sambo ==
Event	Gold	Silver	Bronze
Men's –52 kg	Santiago Aldecoa; Spain	Francisco Ayala; Spain	Jean-Marc Luciani; France
Men's –57 kg	Iñigo Florzxa; Spain	Michel Dupère; France	Barry Cooper; Great Britain
Men's –62 kg	Miguel García; Spain	Giovanni Millite; Italy	Blas Pérez; Spain
Men's –68 kg	Francisco Lorenzo; Spain	Jorge Bocanegra; Spain	Stephen Cooper; Great Britain
Men's –74 kg	Jon Idaretta; Spain	Ángel Giménez; Spain	Anthony Hull; Great Britain
Men's –82 kg	Jon Idaretta; Spain	Didier Duru; France	Gregory Dixon; United States
Men's –90 kg	Eddy Kaspers; Netherlands	Raúl Alfonso; France	Shepard Pittman; United States
Men's –100 kg	William Ward; Great Britain	Gerardo Toro; Spain	Giorgio d'Alessandro; Italy
Men's +100 kg	Chris Dolman; Netherlands	Martin Clarke; Great Britain	Gary Barber; United States
Women's –48 kg	Loli Veguillas; Spain	Esperanza Torrecilla; Spain	Franzi Clemencón; Chile
Women's –52 kg	Sacramanto Moyano; Spain	Isabelle Vauttier; France	María Montero; Spain
Women's –56 kg	Pilar Pérez; Spain	Brenda Maxey; United States	Simone del Prado; France
Women's –60 kg	Begona Gómez; Spain	Ione Irastorza; Spain	Marianne Baudry; France
Women's –64 kg	Mercedes Gómez; Spain	Brigitte Siffeert; France	Maria Hartog; United States
Women's –68 kg	Carmén Bellón; Spain	Jocelyne Sagon; France	Sarah Williams; Great Britain
Women's –72 kg	Isabel Cortabitante; Spain	Conny Barber; United States	Yvette Dupère; France
Women's –80 kg	Mencu Gutiérrez; Spain	Vega Mayte; Spain	Fiona Boty; Great Britain

== Softball ==
Event	Gold	Silver	Bronze
Women's	United States	Chinese Taipei	Netherlands

== Taekwondo ==
Event	Gold	Silver	Bronze
Men's –50 kg	Kim Young-Joo; South Korea	Arnold Baradi; Philippines	Saimon Bailey; Great Britain; Dae-Sung Lee; United States
Men's –54 kg	In Hae-Jin; South Korea	Mike Ventosa; Philippines	Sang-Hon Cha; United States; DiConstanzo Geremia; Italy
Men's –58 kg	Hong Jong-Man; South Korea	Rafaele Marchione; Italy	Khaled El-Sheikh; Egypt; Mark Richardson; Great Britain
Men's –64 kg	Jung Seung-Hwang; South Korea	Lucio Cuozzo; Italy	Errol Edwards; Great Britain; Bernhard Günther; West Germany
Men's –70 kg	Lee Joon-Myung; South Korea	Farag El-Emory; Egypt	Pietro Carrieri; Italy; Lawrence Lindsay; Great Britain
Men's –76 kg	Moon Jong-Kook; South Korea	Richard Warwick; United States	Ihab Khorshid; Egypt; Patrice Remarek; Ivory Coast
Men's –83 kg	Lee Kye-Haeng; South Korea	Eugen Nefedow; West Germany	Michele Romei; Italy; Stuart Hoad; Great Britain
Men's +83 kg	Jimmy Kim; United States	Michael Arndt; West Germany	Rashed Badow; Bahrain; Giovanni Sangiuliano; Italy

== Trampoline gymnastics ==
Event	Gold	Silver	Bronze
Men's individual	Lionel Pioline; France	Nigel Rendell; Great Britain	José Vives; Spain
Men's synchro	Amadeus Regenbrecht; Michael Kuhn; West Germany	Cruz Blanco; José Vives; Spain	Richard Cobbing; Tony Furlong; Great Britain
Men's individual tumbling	Steve Elliott; United States	Chad Fox; United States	Didier Sammola; France
Women's individual	Andrea Holmes; Great Britain	Susan Shotton; Great Britain	Elizabeth Jansen; Australia
Women's synchro	Perry Thomas; Andrea Holmes; Great Britain	Gabi Bahr; Beate Kruswicki; West Germany	Jacqueline de Ruiter; Marjo van Diemen; Netherlands
Women's individual tumbling	Isabelle Jagueux; France	Megan Cunningham; United States	Maria Constantinitis; Canada

== Tug of war ==
Event	Gold	Silver	Bronze
Men's –640 kg	Ireland	Switzerland	England
Men's –720 kg	Ireland	England	Switzerland

== Water skiing ==
Event	Gold	Silver	Bronze
Men's slalom	John Battleday; Great Britain	Marco Merlo; Italy	Patrice Martin; France
Men's tricks	Patrice Martin; France	John Battleday; Great Britain	Bernd Jung; West Germany
Men's jump	Pierre Carmin; France	Neil Ritchie; Australia	Marco Merlo; Italy
Women's slalom	Helena Kjellander; Sweden	Susy Graham; Canada	Karen Morse; Great Britain
Women's tricks	Helena Kjellander; Sweden	Judy McClintock; Canada	Nicola Rasey; Great Britain
Women's jump	Karen Morse; Great Britain	Jane Segal; United States	Judy McClintock; Canada
