= USA Water Ski & Wake Sports =

American non-profit organization

USA Water Ski & Wake Sports, also known as USA Water Ski, is a non-profit water skiing association headquartered in Polk County, Florida whose mission is 'to promote the growth and development of recreational water skiing, and organizing and governing the sport of competitive water skiing." The American Water Ski Association (AWSA) was founded in 1939 to organize the first U.S. National Water Ski Championships. Today, AWSA is one of the nine sport disciplines that comprise USA Water Ski and Wake Sports. As of 2015, USA Water Ski was the largest water ski federation in the world with more than 600 clubs and 20,000 members. In 2016, they announced plans for a new training facility, office complex and space for the industry's Hall of Fame and museum in Auburndale, Florida.

== See also ==
- List of Water Skiing Hall of Fame Inductees
- International Water Ski Federation
- Water Ski Hall of Fame and Museum
- List of U.S. Open of Water Skiing champions
- United States Waterskiing Team
