= Joel McClintock =

Canadian former water skier (born 1960)

Joel McClintock (born October 9, 1960) is a Canadian former water skier. During his career, McClintock and his sister Judy became the first pair of siblings to both win world titles.

== Early life ==
McClintock was born on October 9, 1960, in Mississauga, Ontario. His family ran a water skiing business and he began the sport at the age of three with his older brother. He competed in his first tournament at the age of 10 and internationally at 14.

== Career ==
In 1979, McClintock and his younger sister Judy were selected to compete for Team Canada at the 1979 Water Ski World Championships. At the age of 18, McClintock became the second Canadian to win the Water Ski World Championships overall title by beating former champion Mike Hazelwood. He earned a total of 2, 706.12 points during the tournament while also placing second in the jumping competition. McClintock was named the 1979 Canadian Amateur Athlete of the Year and Cambridge Athlete of the Year for his accomplishments.

However, McClintock was never given the chance to defend his title as he was forced to pull out of the 1981 Water Ski World Championship due to injuries. During his time out of competitions, he published his first book titled The Complete Instructional Book of Waterskiing, and produced an instructional videotape. Meanwhile, his sister continued to attend international tournaments and became the first Canadian women to win the Masters Overall championship at the US Masters Water Ski Tournament. She would later earn the title of Masters Water Ski Trick champion in 1987 and 1988, and Women's World Trick Championship title in 1985. As a result, McClintock and his sister became the first pair of siblings to both win world titles.

After competing in a total of five world championships, McClintock turned to coach the Canadian National Team in 1991 and 1993.

== Honours ==
McClintock and his sister have been inducted into the Canadian Olympic Hall of Fame and into the Water Ski and Wakeboard Canada's Hall of Fame.
