= Seipel =

Seipel is a surname. Notable people with the surname include:

- Ignaz Seipel (1876–1932), Austrian Roman Catholic priest and politician
- Joseph H. Seipel, American sculptor and conceptual artist
- Mike Seipel (born 1960), American competitive barefoot water skier
- Susan Seipel (born 1986), Australian Para-canoeist
