= Superstars (British TV programme) =

British television series

- Genre: Sports entertainment
- Created by: Dick Button
- Based on: Superstars
- Presented by: David Vine (1973–1985); Ron Pickering (1973–1985); Barry Davies (1979); Brian Budd (1980–1981); Johnny Vaughan (2003–05); Suzi Perry (2002–05); John Inverdale (2002); Jim Rosenthal (2008); Sharron Davies (2008); Gabby Logan (2012)
- Country of origin: United Kingdom
- Original language: English
- No. of series: 17 editions

Production
- Executive producers: Philip Lewis (1973); Peter Hylton Cleaver (1979–1985); Rick Thomas (2012)
- Production locations: Crystal Palace National Sports Centre (1973–1974); Ahoy, Rotterdam (1975–1979); Aldershot (1976–1977); Harlow (1979); Cwmbran Stadium (1980); Wingate Institute, Netanya (1980); Bath (1981–1985, 2002); Hong Kong (1981); Christchurch (1982); La Manga Club (2003–2004); K2 Leisure Centre (2008); University of Bath (2012)
- Running time: 60 minutes (2008); 90 minutes (2012)
- Production company: Trans World International

Original release
- Network: BBC One
- Release: 31 December 1973 – 8 April 1985
- Release: 13 June 2002 – 27 February 2005
- Network: Channel 5
- Release: 11 July – 29 August 2008
- Network: BBC One
- Release: 29 December 2012

Superstars is a British television sports competition in which elite athletes from a variety of sports compete against each other in a number of events, resembling a decathlon. The athletes must not compete in the sport for which they practice as their profession. Points are awarded for the position in which the competitor places in each event. The competitor with the most points at the end of all ten events is declared the champion.

In the International, European, and British versions of the contest, athletes would compete in eight out of ten events, with no one allowed to take part in their own sport, although some handicapping rules did apply.

The idea was developed by 1948 and 1952 Olympic figure skating champion Dick Button. The first Superstars competition was held in Rotonda West, Florida in February 1973 and was won by pole vaulter Bob Seagren. The BBC covered the competition and aired their own programme, featuring British athletes, on 31 December 1973, which was won by 400-meter hurdles Olympic champion David Hemery. Television broadcasts of the competitions were popular both in Europe and North America in the 1970s and 1980s. Further events featuring European athletes started in 1975.

Competitors participate in a range of different sporting events, including a 100-yard dash/100m sprint, an 800 metres run, an obstacle course or steeplechase, weightlifting, soccer skills, rowing, tennis, basketball, bicycle racing, shooting and swimming. The sports have varied over time and between the various competitions; while the European versions featured a 600-metre steeplechase, indoor cycling on a highly banked velodrome, and the "Gym Tests".

Canadian soccer player Brian Budd was unbeaten in Superstars contests, winning the World Championship three times consecutively from 1978 to 1980, making him the most successful Superstar of all time.

== British, European and International Superstars ==
=== 1973 ===
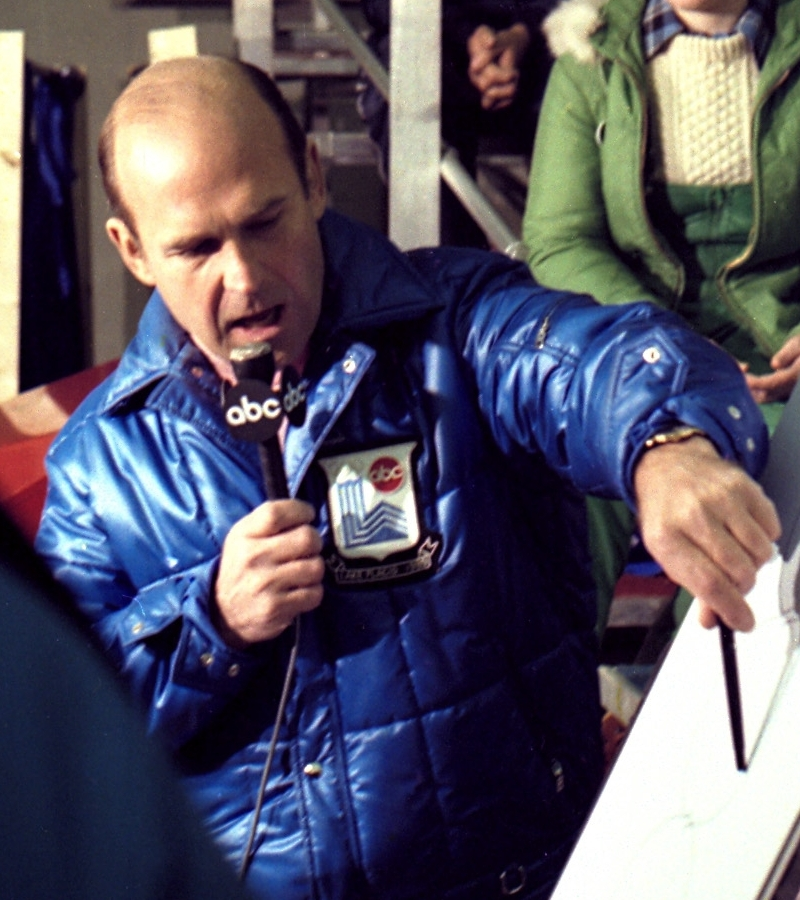
Dick Button, the creator of the US version of Superstars

Superstars was first broadcast in Britain on 31 December 1973, as "Britain's Sporting Superstars", closely following the US format. David Vine, who was the main presenter of the BBC programme from 1973 to 1985, said, "In 1972, Ron Pickering, myself, Don Revie, Billy Bremner and TV producer Barney Colehan sat in a hotel in Leeds and formulated Superstars, but the BBC dismissed the idea. Then Dick Button started it in the States, and the BBC bought the rights".

Recorded at Crystal Palace in August and promoted as a challenge between Britain's seven best sportsmen, the contest was won by David Hemery, the 1968 Olympic champion in the 400-metre hurdles, defeating Jackie Stewart, Bobby Moore, Joe Bugner, Roger Taylor, Tony Jacklin and Barry John. Featuring the first ever gym test (devised by Pickering and comprising circuit running, a medicine ball throw, parallel bar dips, and squat thrusts), the event came down to the final steeplechase, where Hemery overcame a 100-metre handicap to pass Barry John with 60 metres left. Shown on New Year's Eve, the programme was a major success and was repeated the following year.

=== 1974 ===
In the second event in 1974, World Light-Heavyweight Boxing Champion John Conteh comfortably beat an ill Hemery and Colin Bell to win the title, again at Crystal Palace. Conteh credited the highly competitive nature of the contest with increasing his abilities as a boxer. The inception of this cross-sport contest quickly encouraged many top athletes to push themselves further, introducing the idea that the winner could claim to be the country's "top sportsman" and also providing an arena where recently retired champions (such as Hemery and Lynn Davies) could extend their careers.

=== 1975 ===
Following the success of the first two standalone UK competitions, in 1975 the British national Superstars contest was suspended, and the event was widened to include participants from continental Europe. Five preliminary heats were held, followed by a final at the Ahoy indoor arena in Rotterdam, famous for its banked, wooden cycling track. This proved to make Superstars a major hit, achieving large audiences across the continent and paving the way for the International and World Superstars editions to follow.

Memorable events in the first year of European Superstars included Malcolm Macdonald winning the 100m sprint in a Superstars record time of 10.9 seconds (after being made to run the race twice following the false start of another competitor), David Hemery being beaten by Dutch field hockey player Ties Kruize following a fall in the 600m Steeplechase, Swedish discus thrower Ricky Bruch setting records in the weight lifting and medicine ball throw sections of the gym tests, and the first appearance of pole vaulter Kjell Isaksson, who dominated the final heat in Sweden, scoring a then record 69 (out of a possible 80) points.

Prior to the final in Rotterdam, Kruize sustained serious injuries in a car accident and was substituted by Hemery, who ultimately secured the second-place position. Kjell Isaksson dominated the event again, winning four of his eight events and finished second or third in three others, winning the title with an event to spare.

The rules for European Superstars allowed athletes to compete in "near specialist" events with a handicap, meaning that both Hemery and Isaksson were allowed to run in the 100m and Steeplechase, but only after giving the other finalists a head start. In the final 600m Steeplechase event Hemery made up a 100m handicap on his rivals in order to finish in overall second, after again falling badly at the water jump and running the last 100m with badly torn ankle ligaments.

=== 1976 ===
In 1976 national competitions were resumed and Hemery again became UK Superstar, beating Conteh and Formula 1 World Champion James Hunt easily. By now Hemery was a "professional Superstar", competing in Britain, Europe and the US, and devising his own training regime. His performances duly improved, and even though 1976 Olympic Judoka David Starbrook took his parallel bar dips record in the gym tests, Hemery had become Britain's top competitor.

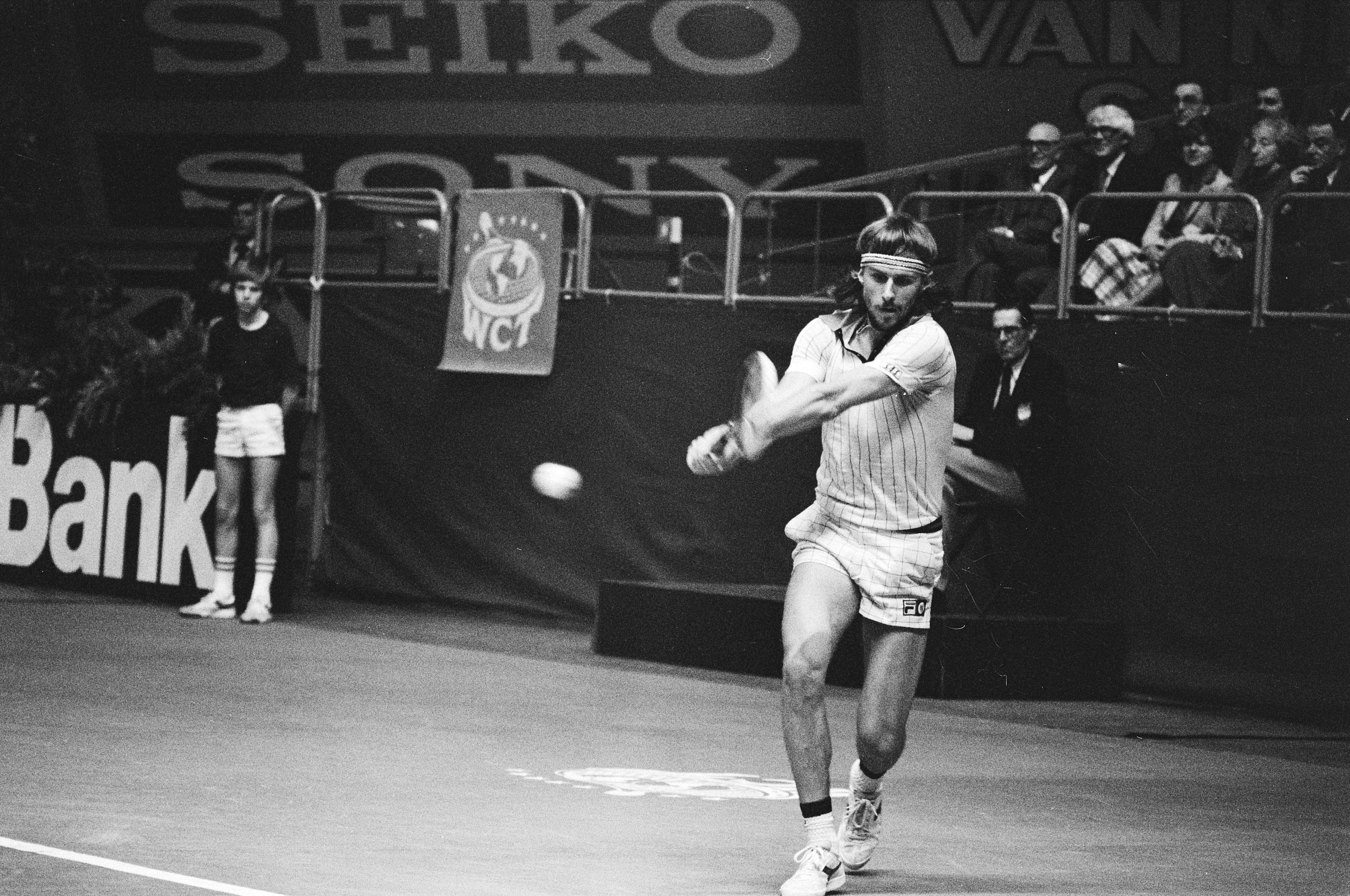
Björn Borg won his heat in European Superstars at Vichy, but was unable to compete again because of scheduling conflicts with his tennis career.

In European Superstars, Isaksson beat Hemery in a heat held in Sweden. Two of the highest-profile heat winners, Björn Borg and Kevin Keegan, were not able to compete in the Rotterdam final due to scheduling conflicts. Keegan's victory produced a memorable moment when he crashed during the cycle racing in his heat. With deep cuts and abrasions to his arm, shoulder and back, the Liverpool footballer was expected to withdraw, but with a large crowd present to watch him he said "These people here in the stands have come here to see me make a fool of myself and they've got a right to it!", got back on his bike and won the re-ride. Keegan then easily won the steeplechase, but like many of the highest-profile performers, his schedule was too full to allow him to compete as regularly as the Superstars format demanded. Partly because of this, less renowned athletes such as Isaksson came to dominate and be recognised outside their specialisms.

In the Ahoy final, Isaksson won five events and finished 20 points ahead of his nearest rival. The top eight finishers were also guaranteed a place at the inaugural World Superstars competition, to be held in the US the following year.

=== 1977 ===
1977 provided two new champions, with Isaksson taking part only in the World contest and David Hemery competing in American Superstars. In the UK national Superstars, rower Tim Crooks beat shot putter Geoff Capes in a tight contest, but failed to qualify for the European final, losing by one point to François Tracanelli in the Spanish heat. Representing Great Britain instead at the Ahoy final was Rugby league player Keith Fielding, who finished a close second, matching Hemery's best ever performance by a British Superstar.

The winner of 1977 European Superstars was the returning Ties Kruize, who was now fully recovered from his car crash. With just the indoor steeplechase left, Kruize was one point behind Jean-Paul Coche but five ahead of Fielding. With Coche having completed his events Fielding needed to win the final race, with Kruize finishing no better than third. With Fielding already finished (and celebrating) Kruize passed speed skater Hans van Helden on the final straight to win by 2.5 points. An exhausted Fielding then told BBC TV that the loss was "a damn, bloody shame", but both qualified for the 1978 World Championship.

=== 1979 ===
There was no UK national or European Superstars contest in 1978, but both events returned in 1979, along with a new "Past Masters" event for competitors over 35, which was won by Lynn Davies, the 1964 Olympic Long Jump champion. 1979 saw the first appearances of judoka Brian Jacks, who became Britain's most famous Superstar. Jacks had enormous upper body strength and quickly came to dominate the gym tests, setting records in squat thrusts and, in particular, the parallel bar dips. In the 1979 UK national final Jacks comprehensively beat the field, and then went on to compete in Rotterdam for the European title.

No Briton had ever won this title, but Jacks was a strong favourite against defending champion Ties Kruize. Jack won the gym tests and set a new record time in the cycling. At the start of the final event, the steeplechase, Jacks had a small lead, but was out of events. Kruize accumulated enough points in the steeplechase to join Jacks in a tie for first place. With no tie-breaking system in operation, both men were crowned European Superstar, making Jacks the most successful British Superstar ever. Jacks succumbed to shingles in late 1979 so was unable to travel to The Bahamas for the World Championship.

=== 1980 ===
Superstars regularly attracted over 10 million TV viewers in the UK and Jacks became a household name, appearing on children's TV shows and picking up endorsements usually beyond the reach of a minority sport participant. Superstars also expanded again in 1980, adding International Superstars to its list of programmes, though this was as a direct replacement for the European event. Although popular in the UK, US, Ireland, New Zealand, Sweden, the Netherlands and Australia, Superstars reached their peak at the turn of the decade, and one by one (starting in Europe) the participating nations fell away.

Against Jacks in 1980 was Daley Thompson, globally recognised as the top multi-sports athlete after his victory in the 1980 Olympic Games decathlon competition. With Brian Budd in attendance for the UK National final, Brian Jacks took on Thompson, Steve Assinder from Basketball, pentathlete Danny Nightingale and the new "Past Master", former 400m hurdler John Sherwood, who won all his events in the heats, setting a new record.

In the gym tests Jacks scored 80 in the dips and 73 in the squat thrusts, and finished 18 points ahead of Sherwood in second place. Thompson finished third. John Sherwood in finishing in second place gained a place in the World Championships and with it the possibility of big prize money. To ensure that he was able to finish second Sherwood had to turn professional part-way through the competition in order to compete in the 100m (as his status as an amateur track and field athlete would normally have barred him from competing in this event). Although many amateur athletes (most notably Kjell Isaksson) had competed in Superstars since its inception, they had never been able to retain any prize money, with this instead of going to their sport. In winning three World Superstar titles, Brian Budd won over $130,000, while Bob Seagren (the first World Champion) won over $200,000.

In International Superstars in Israel Jacks defeated both of the other European Superstars champions Ties Kruize and Kjell Isaksson, as well as 1980 Tour de France winner Joop Zoetemelk to claim the new title.

For Sherwood – a PE teacher from Sheffield at this time, and not a full-time sportsman – the World Championship proved to be a success, but not for Jacks, aiming to become the first European to win the title. In The Bahamas both Britons won events: Jacks in the weightlifting and the gym tests—after an epic struggle against Brian Budd—and Sherwood in the cycle race. However, it was Sherwood's two second-places in the football and 800 metres that propelled him into second place, with the cycling coming at Jack's expense, and winning him $15,000 in the process. He was officially now Britain's best ever Superstar, although he had still finished 26 points behind Budd.

=== 1981 ===
To start the 1981 season, the BBC decided to invite the most successful British Superstars back for a one-off "Challenge of the Champions" programme, featuring all the past winners of the UK National contest, as well as the two "Past Masters" and the two men who had won heats of European Superstars. Joining Brian Jacks were David Hemery, Keith Fielding, Lynn Davies, John Conteh, Tim Crooks, Malcolm MacDonald and John Sherwood.

This was considered one of the strongest UK Superstars contests due to the numerous competitive sportsmen present.

Jacks was the heavy favourite, and duly won his "banker" events, but his inability to compete in the running tests left him facing huge obstacles. His performance in the gym tests was astonishing; smashing his own parallel bars record in the Wycombe sports centre with an awesome 100 in 54 seconds.

The key to winning Superstars was to gain maximum points in your best events and then to place as highly in the others – simple in theory, but hard in practice. Jacks usually dominated in the gym and weightlifting, and almost always also won the cycling and canoeing. That gave him a nominal 40 point head start on his rivals, but if this sequence could be disrupted, then Jacks was relying on picking up more points elsewhere. He never competed in the two running events and was a weaker shot than his rivals, so he was then faced with winning the basketball or swimming which were much more equal events. And in the Challenge of the Champions Keith Fielding was able to disrupt Jacks' strategy by enough to beat him.

Early on Jacks beat Fielding in a record time to win the canoeing, but once Fielding had won the cycling Jacks was beaten. Fielding had entered the event hoping to take the Superstars 100m record first and foremost, and then to put up a good showing against Jacks.

Fielding scored points across the events, including second place in the steeplechase, despite losing the 100 metres to David Hemery. Lynn Davies won the steeplechase, the final event, moving Jacks into third place. Injuries subsequently prevented Jacks from competing in the 1981 British final, ending his participation in Superstars. Fielding followed this result with a second victory in the UK final.

Here, in a new venue Bath, Fielding reached his Superstars highpoint, defeating Davies, pentathlete Jim Fox and new challenger Andy Ripley from Rugby Union. Water skier Mike Hazelwood was tied in first place in the shooting when he misfired the decisive shot, gifting 10 points to Fielding. However, ever-increasing levels of competition saw him lose, first to a resurgent Ripley in the Second International, then to Jody Scheckter in the 1981 World Final. Fielding would never win another Superstars event.

=== 1982: A British World Champion ===
Since 1978, the BBC had also produced a popular British Superteams event, which was dominated from the start by the "Athletes" – a team of track and field stars, who won every series but the final one in 1985. From 1979, a well-known performer in this team was Brian Hooper, a pole-vaulter with a will to win. He first came to prominence in the 1979 Superteams final, failing to be able to jump onto a balance beam in the obstacle course event, and by 1982 he had blossomed into an all-round performer.

Leading the 1982 Athletes team to Superteams victory, Hooper was trailed by the BBC as the new challenger to watch in that season's UK final. He was a strong swimmer, almost unbeatable in the canoeing and gym tests, and competitive in all his other events. And then he lost in his heat, to Karate fighter Vic Charles, and his promise seemed lost. However, Charles was unable to compete in 1982 final, and Hooper was his replacement. He would go on to win his next five straight Superstars events, becoming two times British Superstar, three-time International Superstar, and the 1982 World Superstar Champion. Only Brian Budd has a better record in the competition.

Hooper's victory in the 1982 World Championship came at the expense of defending World Champion Jody Scheckter, and American footballers James Lofton, Cris Collinsworth and Mark Gastineau. Hooper later stated that he felt pressured by the aggressive nature of the US challengers, which came to a head in the final of the bike race, where he found himself boxed in by several rivals all seemingly working in concert to hold him back. Charging through powerfully and fairly, Hooper finished comfortably in the lead, but was then faced with official protests, claiming he either took a short-cut off the track or otherwise acted illegally. He clearly had not, and was quickly declared the legitimate winner. Victories in the rowing and second place in the gym test and swimming saw him win by just 3/4 of a point from talented runner Lofton. He was however 10 3/4 points clear entering the final event (and thus guaranteed to win the title) and coasted through his obstacle course heat. As only the two fastest heat winners ran in the final, Hooper could not add to his tally. Lofton on the other hand had $10000 to fight for bested Renaldo Nehemiah in the final event, and duly took second place, something again he was virtually guaranteed before the event.

By now a professional Superstar (he won $37000 for the 1982 World Championship), Brian Hooper dominated British and International Superstars until he retired in 1984. He beat all of the major British Superstars of his era except Brian Jacks, who had previously retired through injury. Returning to the event at age 50 in 2004, Hooper competed ably despite a torn pectoral muscle, finishing fourth against rivals at least 15 years younger than himself. Even now he still won the kayaking and came second in golf, almost making the final, beaten only in the end by an agonising uphill bike race.

=== 1983 to 1985: End of the first era ===
Though Brian Hooper continued to compete in (and dominate) Superstars events until he retired in 1984, he stopped competing in the UK national contest after 1983, and he was succeeded as national champion in 1984 by athlete Garry Cook. The 1983 championship was also notable for the record breaking performances of Des Drummond in the 100m, with the agile Leigh Rugby League player managing to lower the markdown to only 10.85 seconds, in itself a time comparable with many full-time track and field athletes who would compete in the 1984 Summer Olympics. The final also saw Hooper beat Vic Charles (the only man ever to finish above him in any Superstars competition at that point).

In the 1984 final, Garry Cook was pushed very close by professional stunt performer and motorcycle racer Eddie Kidd, but he held on against a weaker field than usual to become champion. Cook also competed in the now more popular Superteams series as part of the never-defeated "Athletes" team, who were only finally beaten during the last season of the show in 1985. By now, the BBC had decided that the programme was in need of "freshening up" and had altered the format several times, changing the format of the gym tests to include bar jumps and adding computerized scoring to stop the trend of sliding squat thrusts. The programme was also moved to Portsmouth and took on a naval theme, adding a field gun competition in a bid to boost flagging ratings. The final series of Superteams was duly won by "Watersports" (a team representing swimming, water-skiing and diving) which was led by Olympic swimmer Robin Brew who excelled at running events and also in the gym tests, where the bar jump became his speciality.

Continuing this success, Brew reached the final of the 1985 UK national championship where he narrowly beat a strong field, including Rugby league player Joe Lydon, Olympic silver medallist Judoka Neil Adams and then only a one-time Olympic gold medal winning rower, Steve Redgrave. The RAF officer then completed a successful first year in Superstars by becoming the last ever international champion, this time much more comfortably.

A new period of Superstars dominance could have evolved for Brew, but with the UK version being the only surviving national championship outside the United States, and no prospect of World Superstars being revived, once TWI decided to halt production of International Superstars the BBC version was soon cancelled as well. With viewing figures falling, and potential participants ever more disincentive into not entering by scheduling conflicts and insurance demands, the BBC's decision to end the show was neither unexpected or mourned, and although David Vine, Ron Pickering and executive producer Peter Hylton Cleaver did fight to keep the show on air, it was all to no avail.

Over the next fifteen years, though the US version continued unabated, Superstars in the UK existed solely as a nostalgic memory for sporting clip shows, usually focussing on Kevin Keegan falling off his bike, Stan Bowles shooting the table instead of a target, or Brian Jacks eating oranges. During the 1990s BBC programmes (such as Fantasy Football League) regularly made use of this footage – and kept the show in the public spotlight – while Sky Sports began to show full-length programmes on its Sky Sports Classic channel. This, together with a new generation of television executives and sports presenters who grew up as fans of the show, created interest in a revival, which finally happened as part of the 2002 Sport Relief charity event.

=== 2002 to 2004: Sport Relief and a new era ===
In 2002, the BBC held a one-off, but truncated, UK Championship as a major feature of its biannual Sport Relief charity telethon. Featuring a field including Sir Steve Redgrave, Martin Offiah, John Regis, Austin Healey and Chris Boardman, the event was a first for a British Superstars event in that it featured both non-British competitors (Dwight Yorke and Gianluca Vialli) and also female participants (Alex Coomber and Stephanie Cook). With only seven events (as opposed to the usual eight or ten) and being only part of a larger event instead of being a stand-alone series, the contest was different from those of the earlier era.

While the participants were no less able, the event was less "competitive", with no prize money at stake and no European, World or International contest to qualify for. It was dominated by Healey, who won four of his five events, and came runner-up in the other. Stephanie Cook was the other stand-out performer, finishing joint second with Olympic cycling champion Chris Boardman, and finishing runner-up in two events.

The event was an overwhelming success, and it inspired the BBC to create a new UK Championship series in 2003. Produced by TWI and held in La Manga Club in Spain, this time it was a full event with heats and a final, something that had not been part of the series since 1983.

=== 2008: Revival on Five ===
On 29 April 2008, it was announced that the show would be returning on Five for the summer of 2008. It was produced by TWI with eight one-hour shows. In a change of format, the competitors were split into four teams, captained by Kelly Holmes, Steve Redgrave, Roger Black and Mike Catt.

=== 2012: Olympic Superstars ===
Following the success of Team GB at the 2012 London Olympics, the BBC revived Superstars for a single special edition that aired on Saturday 29 December at 6.45 pm, comprising a men's and women's UK championship. Presented by Gabby Logan, Iwan Thomas and Denise Lewis, the event was held on 24 and 25 November 2012, at the sports facilities of the University of Bath.

The show featured Olympic medallists who were coached for swimming by Rebecca Adlington, and the competitors were: Alistair Brownlee, Jonathan Brownlee, Mo Farah, Robbie Grabarz, Michael Jamieson, Anthony Joshua, Andrew Triggs Hodge, Peter Wilson, Nicola Adams, Lizzie Armitstead, Laura Bechtolsheimer, Gemma Gibbons, Helen Glover, Katherine Grainger, Jade Jones, Christine Ohuruogu.

The Men's Championship was won comfortably by Olympic Super-heavyweight boxing champion Anthony Joshua, while the Women's Championship was won even more convincingly by women's coxless pair Olympic champion Helen Glover. Joshua won with an event to spare, while Glover won her final event (the Gym Tests) to win the Women's Superstars title by 14 points.

=== List of Champions ===
==== British Men's National Superstars ====
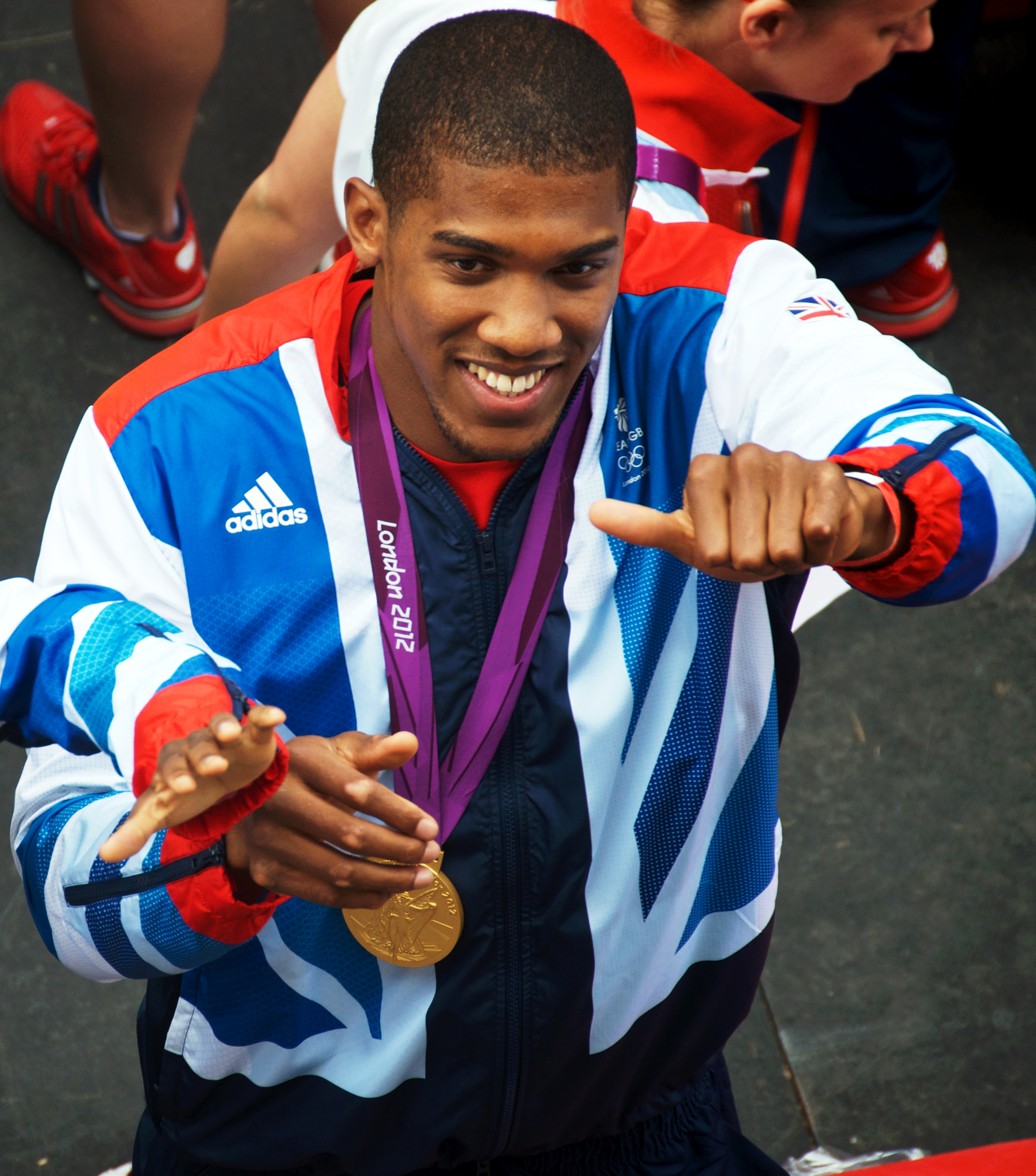
Anthony Joshua won the British Men's National Superstars Championship during the 2012 Olympic Superstars edition.

Position	Athlete	Sport	Country
1973 – Crystal Palace
1st	David Hemery	400-metre hurdles	England
2nd	Barry John	Rugby union	Wales
3rd	Joe Bugner	Boxing	England
1974 – Crystal Palace
1st	John Conteh	Boxing	England
2nd	David Hemery	400-metre hurdles	England
3rd	Colin Bell	Football	England
1975 – No Competition
1976 – Aldershot
1st	David Hemery	400-metre hurdles	England
2nd	John Conteh	Boxing	England
3rd	James Hunt	Formula 1	England
1977 – Aldershot
1st	Tim Crooks	Rowing	England
2nd	Geoff Capes	Shot put	England
3rd	Dave Boy Green	Boxing	England
1978 – No Competition
1979 – Harlow
1st	Brian Jacks	Judo	England
2nd	Lynn Davies	Long jump	Wales
3rd	Andy Irvine	Rugby union	Scotland
1980 – Cwmbran
1st	Brian Jacks	Judo	England
2nd	John Sherwood	400-metre hurdles	England
3rd	Daley Thompson	Decathlon	England
1981 – Bath
1st	Keith Fielding	Rugby league	England
2nd	Andy Ripley	Rugby union	England
3rd	Mike Hazelwood	Water skiing	England
1981 – Challenge of the Champions – Bath
1st	Keith Fielding	Rugby league	England
2nd	John Sherwood	400-metre hurdles	England
3rd	Brian Jacks	Judo	England
1982 – Bath
1st	Brian Hooper	Pole vault	England
2nd	Alan Lerwill	Long jump	England
3rd	Keith Fielding	Rugby league	England
1983 – Bath
1st	Brian Hooper	Pole vault	England
2nd	Des Drummond	Rugby league	England
3rd	Vic Charles	Karate	England
1984 – Bath
1st	Garry Cook	400-metres	England
2nd	Eddie Kidd	Stunt performer	England
3rd	Peter Elliott	800 metres	England
1985 – Portsmouth
1st	Robin Brew	Swimming	Scotland
2nd	Joe Lydon	Rugby league	England
3rd	Steve Redgrave	Rowing	England
1986 – 2001: No Competitions
2002 – Sport Relief – Bath
1st	Austin Healy	Rugby union	England
2nd	Stephanie Cook	Modern pentathlon	England
2nd	Chris Boardman	Individual pursuit	England
2003 – La Manga
1st	Du'aine Ladejo	400-metres	England
2nd	Alain Baxter	Slalom skiing	Scotland
3rd	Jamie Baulch	400-metres	Wales
2004 – La Manga
1st	Alain Baxter	Slalom skiing	Scotland
2nd	Du'aine Ladejo	400-metres	England
3rd	Steve Williams	Rowing	England
2005 – 2011: No Competitions
2012 – Bath
1st	Anthony Joshua	Boxing	England
2nd	Michael Jamieson	Swimming	Scotland
3rd	Alistair Brownlee	Triathlon	England

- In 2002 Stephanie Cook and Chris Boardman finished as joint-runners up of the British Championship.

==== British Women's National Superstars ====
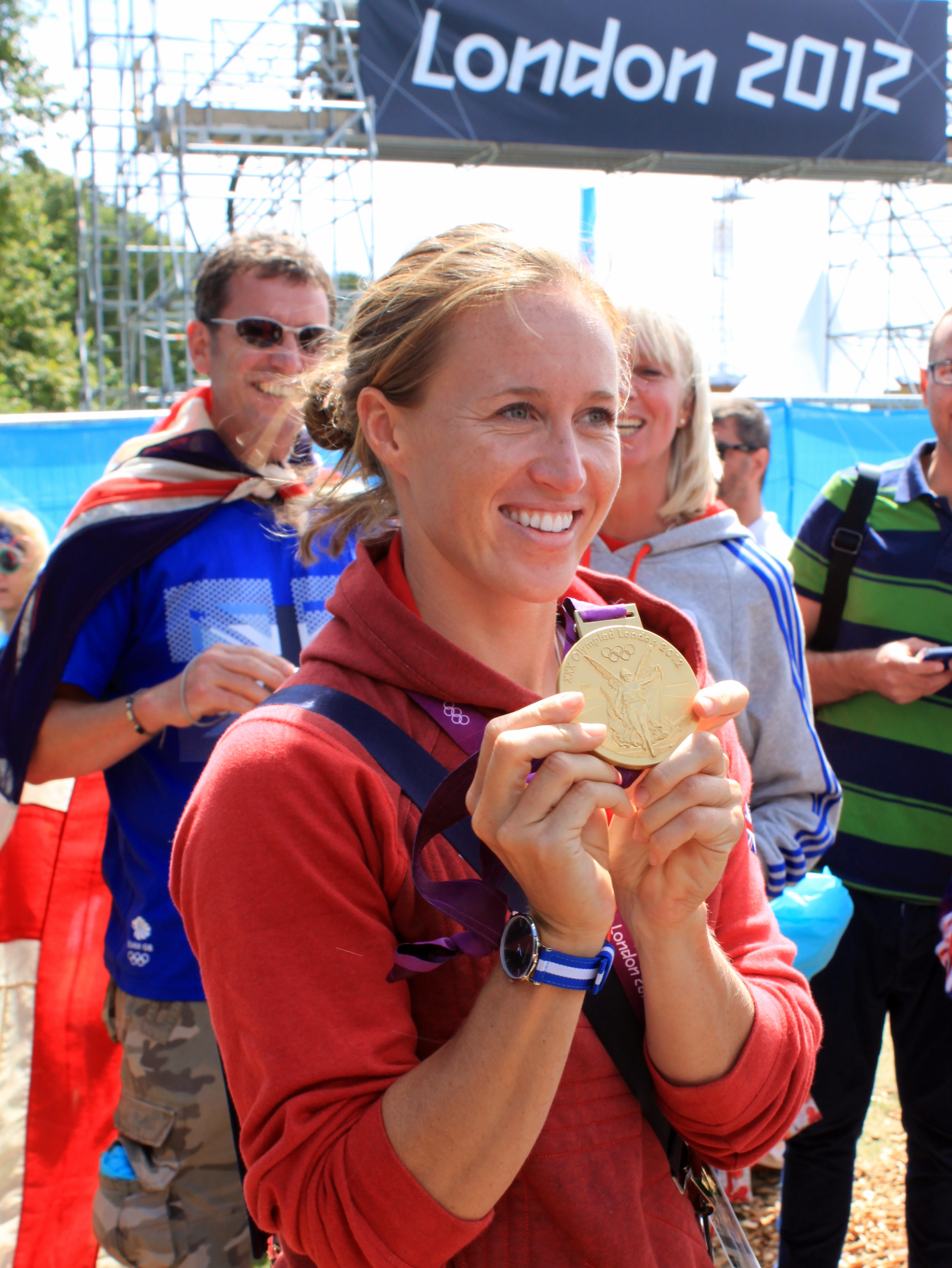
Helen Glover won the British Women's National Superstars Championship during the 2012 Olympic Superstars edition of the show.

Year	Athlete	Sport	Country
1977	Gillian Gilks	Badminton	England
1978: No Competition
1979	Valerie Robinson	Field hockey	England
1980	Anne Hobbs	Tennis	England
1981	Valerie Robinson	Field hockey	England
1982 – 2003: No Competitions
2003	Zoë Baker	Swimming	England
2003	Lesley McKenna	Snowboarding	Scotland
2004	Denise Lewis	Heptathlon	England
2005 – 2011: No Competitions
2012	Helen Glover	Rowing	England

- In 2003 Zoë Baker and Lesley McKenna finished as joint-winners of the British Women's Championship.

==== European and International Superstars ====
Position	Athlete	Sport	Country
European Champions
1975 – Rotterdam, Netherlands
1st	Kjell Isaksson	Pole vault	Sweden
2nd	David Hemery	400-metre hurdles	Great Britain (United Kingdom)
3rd	Ard Schenk	Speed skating	Netherlands
1976, Rotterdam, Netherlands
1st	Kjell Isaksson	Pole vault	Sweden
2nd	Johan Granath	Speed skating	Sweden
3rd	Karl Schnabl	Ski jumping	Austria
1977, Rotterdam, Netherlands
1st	Ties Kruize	Field hockey	Netherlands
2nd	Keith Fielding	Rugby league	Great Britain (United Kingdom)
3rd	Jean-Paul Coche	Judo	France
1978 – No Competition
1979, Rotterdam, Netherlands
1st	Ties Kruize	Field hockey	Netherlands
1st	Brian Jacks	Judo	Great Britain (United Kingdom)
3rd	Otti Roethof	Karate	Netherlands
International Champions
1980, Netanya, Israel
1st	Brian Jacks	Judo	Great Britain (United Kingdom)
2nd	Kjell Isaksson	Pole vault	Sweden
3rd	Ties Kruize	Field hockey	Netherlands
1981, Eilat, Israel
1st	Andy Ripley	Rugby union	Great Britain (United Kingdom)
2nd	Jody Scheckter	Auto racing	South Africa
3rd	Keith Fielding	Rugby league	Great Britain (United Kingdom)
1982, Victoria Harbour, Hong Kong
1st	Brian Hooper	Pole vault	Great Britain (United Kingdom)
2nd	Andy Ripley	Rugby union	Great Britain (United Kingdom)
3rd	Guido Kratschmer	Decathlon	West Germany
1983, Victoria Harbour, Hong Kong
1st	Brian Hooper	Pole vault	Great Britain (United Kingdom)
2nd	Gerry Loftus	Trampolining	Ireland (Republic of Ireland)
3rd	Des Drummond	Rugby league	Great Britain (United Kingdom)
1984, Auckland, New Zealand
1st	Brian Hooper	Pole vault	Great Britain (United Kingdom)
2nd	Phil Anderson	road cycling	Australia
3rd	David Hemery	400-metre Hurdles	Great Britain (United Kingdom)
1985, Cyprus
1st	Robin Brew	Swimming	Great Britain (United Kingdom)

- In 1979 Ties Kruize and Brian Jacks finished as joint-winners of the European Championship.

=== Miscellany and records ===
- Three men each won two European or International Superstars championships: Swedish pole vaulter Kjell Isaksson, Dutch field hockey player Ties Kruize and British judoka Brian Jacks. Brian Hooper won three, and one World championship.
- One of the European competitors was Ivo Van Damme, a middle-distance runner who was killed in a road accident in 1976.
- For most of the duration of the run of this programme on BBC TV, the programmes' producer was Peter Hylton Cleaver.
- Brian Jacks had a computer game based on the competition, Brian Jacks Superstar Challenge, named after him.
- In 1982, electronic scoring systems were introduced, with pressure pads for the squat thrusts. These originally ran on the VIC-20, and later on the BBC Micro. The programs were developed and the system operated by Simon Taylor.
- In the spin-off called The Superteams a memorable moment was when British athlete Garry Cook played goalkeeper in the six-a-side hockey contest without wearing a helmet, running out of the D circle and tackling an opponent.
- The BBC Superstars used a musical theme composed by Johnny Pearson titled "Heavy Action". This piece of music later became familiar to Americans as the theme music for Monday Night Football.
- After each event, the competitor who is ranked first gains 10 points, the next best ranked gets 7, then 4, 2 and then finally 1 point. These points are then totalled up to give a total out of 80 (from a maximum of eight events). Lynn Davies won seven of his eight events in the 1979 UK Past Masters contest and scored 70 points (a record).

== World Superstars ==
In 1976, following the success of the Superstars programme in the US, Britain and mainland Europe, Dick Button and American host broadcaster ABC decided to organise a World Superstars Final. David Vine and Ron Pickering were sent across the Atlantic to present the annual programme for the British audience.

=== 1977 – Callaway Gardens, Georgia, US ===
1977 World Superstars Championship Final Result

Place	Athlete	Sport	Country
1st	Bob Seagren	Pole vault	United States
2nd	Kjell Isaksson	Pole Vault	Sweden
3rd	Peter Snell	1500 metres	New Zealand

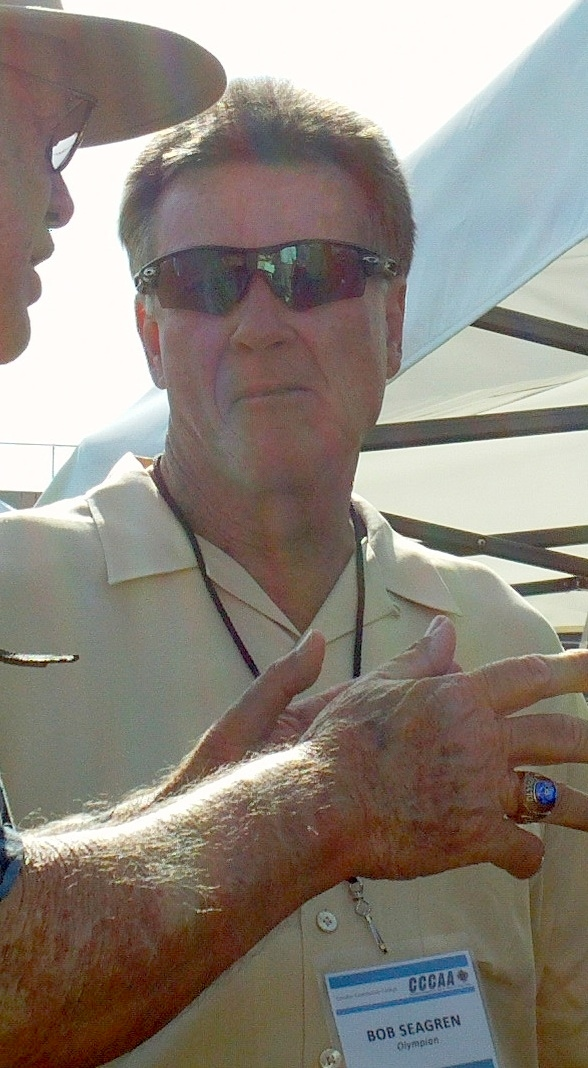
Bob Seagren won the inaugural World Superstars Championship at Callaway Gardens in Georgia in 1977

The participants in the inaugural "World Superstars Championship" were to be the competitors from across the various national and continental versions of the show with the best records in the previous years, and as such the US was to be represented by its previous national champions Bob Seagren, O. J. Simpson, and three time reigning current champion Kyle Rote, Jr. The rest of the participants were to be drawn from the top six finishers from the 1976 European Superstars final, the top six from the US version in 1977, and the winner of the 1976 Canadian Superstars event. In reality, as was always an issue for Superstars, several competitors withdrew in the weeks before the contest, with Rote and Simpson pulling out just a week before the March taping, leaving a slightly weakened field headed by Seagren, double European champion Kjell Isaksson, Canadian champion Tony Gabriel and the joint runners-up from the US final Guy Drut and Dave Casper.

Aside from the withdrawals of Rote and Simpson the other major omission from the field was the double British champion and 1975 European runner-up David Hemery who was studying at university in the US, and had failed to qualify for the 1976 European final after finishing a narrow third in his heat. Had he paddled his Kayak 0.4 seconds faster or scored two more points in the pistol shooting he would have made the final, and with other strong European challengers (like Ties Kruize, Kevin Keegan and Björn Borg) also absent, the European challenge was significantly poorer.

The contest started with Rowing, where Peter Snell capitalised on a mistake from fellow athlete Frank Nusse to win the first ten points, then the penalty shoot-out. Here Gareth Edwards was one kick away from winning nearly $5,000, but he fluffed his final shot and had to settle for a five-way tie for second place, while Guy Drut easily won the play-off, and took the money. After this it became a two-way contest between the two pole-vaulters, Isaksson and Seagren.

Controversially, Seagren (by nature of being retired from IAAF competition) was allowed to run in the track and field events, while Isaksson was not. Seagren later admitted that this gave him a major advantage over his younger, Swedish rival, as running was a fundamental part of any pole-vaulter's training regime, and thus they had to be favoured in such events. While Seagren was unable to win the 100 yard sprint, he did score two points, and his win in the half-mile race gave him a further ten. Isaksson countered with a win in the gym tests and two second-place finishes in the bike race and weightlifting. Seagren however kept competing strongly and his victory in the swimming and second place in the gym tests saw him take a 33 points to 30 lead over Snell and Isaksson into the final event: the obstacle course.

This event was not held in Europe, and therefore Isaksson was attempting it for the first time. In the heats Isaksson ran a time of 25.81 seconds, while Snell was far behind with 29.2 seconds. Seagren however, with much more experience in the event, ran 0.8 seconds faster than the Swede, finishing in 24.64 seconds. His loss in the final to record holder Lynn Swann was irrelevant; the seven points for second place made him the first World Superstars Champion, and won him $37,000 in the process.

=== 1978 – Freeport, Bahamas ===
1978 World Superstars Championship Final Result

Place	Athlete	Sport	Country
1st	Brian Budd	Soccer	Canada
2nd	Bob Seagren	Pole vault	United States
3rd	Greg Pruitt	American football	United States

With the Superstars franchise nearing its zenith of popularity, the World Championship returned in 1978 with a 12-man field consisting of the national champions from Canada, Australia and New Zealand, the top three finishers from the 1977 European Superstars final, and the top five from the 1978 US National Championship. Completing the line-up was the returning champion, Bob Seagren.

Though the 1977 runner-up Kjell Isaksson was missing (he would not compete in Superstars again until 1980), Europe was strongly represented by Jean-Paul Coche, Keith Fielding and Ties Kruize, while Wayne Grimditch, Greg Pruitt and Dwight Stones (who could famously jump up the 10-feet high obstacle course wall in one stride) represented the US. It was the Canadian champion however, Brian Budd, who would completely dominate the contest, and World Superstars for the next three years.

Budd was multifaceted as an athlete, his soccer training covering swimming, running, bike racing and gym work. He also understood that the key to winning Superstars was to win as many points as possible in the events you were good at, and to hold on for as many points as possible in the others. He turned out to be nearly unbeatable in the gym, half-mile race and the swimming, and more than competent in cycling and rowing. In 1978 he won 44 points from these five events alone, ten points more than he needed to become World Champion.

In the 100-yard dash, joint favourites Greg Pruitt and Keith Fielding were both unbeaten in the 100 yards/metres, and a fabulous race was in prospect. Budd got off to a blistering start – according to the UK commentator Ron Pickering it was 'a flyer' – and led in the first 30 yards, but Pruitt, then Fielding accelerated, and the two had a large lead over the rest of the field. As they approached the finish line, Fielding pulled onto Pruitt's shoulder, then leaned as the two crossed the line together. Without photo-finish equipment the result had to be called from hand-timing only. Fielding was given a time of 9.97 seconds; Pruitt had officially run 9.96. Fielding believed he had won, as did the BBC commentators covering the final. Fielding's challenge was teetering, and in the half-mile run the searing Caribbean heat and a crazy pace he had attempted to catch up with Budd cost him physically; he collapsed of heat exhaustion and had to receive first aid and oxygen from Ron Pickering at track-side.

Fielding finished fifth, making him the highest-placing European competitor. Bob Seagren Placed second, finishing 14 points behind the winner, Budd. Budd, representing Canada, secured the overall victory and went on to win the event for the following two years.

=== 1979 – Freeport, Bahamas ===
1979 World Superstars Championship Final Result

Place	Athlete	Sport	Country
1st	Brian Budd	Soccer	Canada
2nd	Wayne Grimditch	Water Skiing	United States
3rd	Greg Pruitt	American football	United States

The third World Championship was held in March 1979, again in the sweltering heat of Freeport, Bahamas. Budd returned as reigning World and Canadian champion (and strong favourite) with Pruitt back as well, but this time as US National Champion. The European challenge was again restricted by injury and conflicting commitments, and was restricted to three competitors: UK runner-ups Lynn Davies and Dave Boy Green and Irish Superstars champion Pat Spillane.

The 1979 European Superstars final had finished with Ties Kruize and Brian Jacks joint-winners, but both had missed out on The Bahamas through injury. If Europe was perhaps under represented, then the US challenge was as formidable as ever, with Pruitt, Wayne Grimditch, Jim Taylor and Joe Theismann all qualifying. Completing the line-up were two invited challengers – not Hemery, Isaksson, Fielding or Kyle Rote though. Instead the organisers had asked both Emerson Fittipaldi and Rafael Septién to "make up the numbers", even though only Fittipaldi had ever entered Superstars before, both in the US and Europe, but neither time with any success. They did however represent Brazil and Mexico respectively, and thus increase the media interest in the contest in Latin America. They would have little impact on the final.

That was not the case for Budd, who dominated again, winning three events comprehensively, setting new records in the swimming and half-mile run in the process. He also finished third in every other event he competed in, winning the title by thirteen points this time. While Grimditch and Pruitt won multiple events, they could not match Budd's consistency. Neither could the best European, Lynn Davies, who finished second in four events but disappointed in the weightlifting and gym tests. In the end only two points separated second to fourth, with Grimditch beating Pruitt for second on count-back, and Davies two points back in fourth.

=== 1980 – Freeport, Bahamas ===
1980 World Superstars Championship Final Result

Place	Athlete	Sport	Country
1st	Brian Budd	Soccer	Canada
2nd	John Sherwood	400-metre hurdles	Great Britain (United Kingdom)
3rd	Brian Jacks	Judo	Great Britain (United Kingdom)

Brian Budd won by the largest margin ever in the World Championship, winning three of the sports and finishing second in four. Because this was his third consecutive championship, he was not allowed to participate in any more Superstars competitions.

=== 1981 – Key Biscayne, Florida, US ===
1981 World Superstars Championship Final Result

Place	Athlete	Sport	Country
1st	Jody Scheckter	Auto racing	South Africa
2nd	Declan Burns	Kayaking	Republic of Ireland
3rd	Russ Francis	American football	United States

=== 1982 – Key Biscayne, Florida, US ===
1982 World Superstars Championship Final Result

Place	Athlete	Sport	Country
1st	Brian Hooper	Pole vault	Great Britain (United Kingdom)
2nd	James Lofton	American football	United States
3rd	Cris Collinsworth	American football	United States

=== List of World Superstars Champions ===
Year	Athlete	Sport	Country
1977	Bob Seagren	Pole vault	United States
1978	Brian Budd	Soccer	Canada
1979	Brian Budd	Soccer	Canada
1980	Brian Budd	Soccer	Canada
1981	Jody Scheckter	Auto racing	South Africa
1982	Brian Hooper	Pole Vault	Great Britain (United Kingdom)

== Music ==
For the British, European and International versions of the show, and in all episodes broadcast in the UK (regardless of where the episode originated) the theme music is "Heavy Action", written by Johnny Pearson. The strong association of the theme music to Superstars has led to the music being frequently misidentified as "Superstars", even though it is used in other countries as the theme to other sports events (such as in the United States, where versions of the piece have served as the long-time theme music of the NFL Monday Night Football broadcasts on ABC and later ESPN).

While not necessarily written specifically for the UK version of Superstars (with Heavy Action instead being written by Pearson for the BBC music library in 1970 while he was working on Top of the Pops), the music has now become synonymous with both Superstars in the UK, and indeed sport in general, still regularly used by the BBC on sports shows, such as during the 2012 Summer Olympics.

The ABC version in the 1970s and 1980s also used an instrumental version of Superstar from Jesus Christ Superstar as its theme.
