= Kris LaPoint =

American former professional water skier (born 1953)

Personal information
- Born: January 23, 1953 (age 72); Oakland, California
- Height: 6 ft 3 in (191 cm)
- Spouse: Jennifer Leachman LaPoint

Sport
- Country: United States
- Sport: Waterskiing
- Event: Slalom

Kris LaPoint (born 23 January 1953) is an American former professional water skier. During his career he set or tied the world record on seven occasions and won 14 major championships. In 2008 he was inducted into the Water Ski Hall of Fame. He is the older brother of water skier Bob LaPoint.

== Biography ==
Kris LaPoint was born in Castro Valley, California in 1953, two years prior to his brother Bob. In 1967 at the age of 13 he set the world slalom record at the Tournament of Champions in Mission Bay in San Diego. LaPoint would go on to set or tie seven world records and win 14 major championships.

LaPoint is married to water skier Jennifer Leachman, a former women's slalom world record holder and a 2015 Water Ski Hall of Fame inductee. The couple now work as real estate agents and also run a ski school at their private lake, LaPoint Ski Park, in Orlando, Florida. Following Andy Mapple's death in 2015, LaPoint and Jeff Rogers took over running Mapple Skis. After several years of continuing to promote the Mapple Ski brand, LaPoint decided to found his own brand, LaPoint Skis, which are all hand-made by Kris on site at LaPoint Ski Park.

== Achievements ==
World Records
3@35' off	1966		
6@35' off	1969		
1@38' off	1970		
2@38' off	1975		
4@38' off	1975		
3@39.5' off	August 8, 1982	Champion Lake	Shreveport, LA
4.5@39.5' off	April 29, 1984	McCormick's	Seffner, FL

Major Championships
Masters Titles	1967, 1968, 1970, 1971, 1972, 1973, 1977
U.S. National Championships	1971, 1972, 1973, 1974, 1975, 1977, 1982
World Championships	none
