= Stewart McDonald (water skier) =

Stewart McDonald (February 20, 1925 – August 26, 2008), born Henry Stewart McDonald, III in Brooklyn, New York, grew up in Washington, D.C., and served in the United States Army Air Forces during World War II and Korean War veteran of the US AIr Force, including test pilot and aerial refueling. He attended Cornell. He began (pre-NASCAR) stock car racing in 1947. After recuperating from a crash, he attended the University of Miami and in 1948 began a long association with Cypress Gardens and the sport of water skiing including ABC Sports Color commentator and induction to the Waterski Hall of Fame in 1992. He was the first president of the Florida Motion Picture & Television Association (FMTPA) in Tampa. He was also an actor, model, movie producer, raconteur, public speaker, auto-mechanic, humorist, and writer. He was involved in many aspects of television advertisements including Cadillac, Vitalis hair products, and Mercury Outboard motors. He operated water-ski schools in Biscayne Bay and Tampa Bay, was the first rated Senior Judge in 1959, and co-author of the American Water Ski Association Judges Manual and other AWSA manuals. He was a local group leader of the Quiet Birdmen for 32 years and chairman of the national executive committee for two years

While racing cars, involvement in the early days of barefoot water skiing, and even black-tie parties he earned the nickname of "Barefoot Stew" and a reputation for vigorously independent thinking He was the biological father of biologist George M. Church at MacDill Air Force Base in 1954. He was director and master of ceremonies of the Water Ski Show at the San Antonio 1968 HemisFair. He was inducted into the Water Skiing Hall of Fame in 1992. He died in 2008 at his home in Tampa, Florida. He was 83 years old.
