= Judy McClintock =

Canadian water skier (born 1963)

Judy McClintock-Messer (born September 6, 1963) is a Canadian former water skier. She won the Masters Water Ski Tournament in 1981 and the Water Ski World Championships in 1985 and 1995.

== Early life ==
McClintock was born on September 6, 1963, to parents J. P. McClintock and Joyce McClintock in Mississauga, Ontario. She began water skiing at the age of three and won her first competition when she was 10. McClintock was the youngest of five children and three of her brothers also water skied competitively.

== Career ==
In 1975, McClintock competed alongside her brothers at the National Water Skiing Championships in Ottawa. There, she broke the junior girl's slalom and came in second place in junior girls trick. Shortly thereafter, McClintock began her international competitive career in 1977 at the Water Ski World Championships in Milan, Italy, when she was 13 years old. In the same year, she competed in the juvenile division of the 1977 Canadian National Water Skiing Championships where she set a new record with 50.5 points. In August 1977, McClintock and her two brothers competed in the Canada Summer Games. However, after winning a gold medal in the women's tricks competitions, she cut her foot on a rock and was questionable for the slalom competition. McClintock was eventually cleared to compete and won second place in the slalom competition.

In 1979, McClintock and her brother Joel McClintock were selected to compete for Team Canada at the 1979 Water Ski World Championships. This would begin McClintock's climb towards her first international championship titles in 1981, 1987, and 1988. After winning a gold medal at the 1980 Canadian Water Skiing Championships with a total of 4.880 points, McClintock became the first Canadian women to win the Masters Overall championship at the US Masters Water Ski Tournament. She would later earn the title of Masters Water Ski Trick champion in 1987 and 1988, while also earning her first Women's World Trick Championship title in 1985. McClintock and her brother Joel thus became the first pair of siblings to both win world titles.

Prior to retiring in 1996, McClintock won another World Championships title, set 48 overall national records, and won every title in water skiing.

== Honours ==
After earning her first Masters Water Ski Trick championship title, McClintock was inducted into the Canadian Olympic Hall of Fame. At the turn of the 21st century, she was inducted into the Water Ski and Wakeboard Canada's Hall of Fame alongside her brother and later the Cambridge Sports Hall of Fame in 2008.

== Personal life ==
McClintock married Perry John Messer in 1985 and together they opened a fitness business in Northampton, Massachusetts. Her brother Jeff was inducted into the Water Ski and Wakeboard Canada's Hall of Fame in 2011 and his daughter Whitney also competed in water skiing competitions.
