= Superstars (American TV program) =

Television series

- Genre: Sports entertainment
- Created by: Dick Button
- Presented by: Various (in 2009, John Saunders and Jenn Brown)
- Country of origin: United States
- Original language: English
- No. of series: 29 editions

Production
- Running time: 60–90 minutes

Original release
- Network: ABC
- Release: February 25, 1973 – 1984
- Network: NBC
- Release: 1985 – 1990
- Network: ABC
- Release: 1991 – 1994
- Release: 1998 – 2002
- Network: CBS
- Release: 2003 – 2003
- Network: ABC
- Release: 2009 – August 4, 2009

Related
- Wide World of Sports; British Superstars

Superstars was a televised sporting event featuring top athletes from different sports competing in a series of events that were not their own. The idea was developed by Dick Button and it first aired as a two-hour ABC Sports special in the winter of 1973.

Competitors chose to participate in a range of different sporting events including a 100-yard dash, a half-mile run, bowling, weightlifting, rowing, tennis, basketball, bicycle racing, swimming and an obstacle course. The sports have varied over time and between the various competitions. Points are awarded for the position in which the competitor places in each event. The competitor with the most points at the end is declared the champion.

By the end of 1973, a similar event appeared in Great Britain and within a few years, separate competitions were being held in other countries including Australia, Canada, Ireland, Netherlands, New Zealand and Sweden.

The American version grew to encompass women, entire sports teams and celebrities and lasted off and on for three decades, from 1973 until 2003. It was briefly revived in 2009. From 1977 to 1982 six World Superstar championships took place, bringing together top U.S. and European finishers and the national champions from other countries. Canadian soccer player Brian Budd was unbeaten in Superstars contests, winning the World Championship three times consecutively from 1978 to 1980, making him the most successful Superstar of all time.

== Origin ==
The idea was developed by 1948 and 1952 Olympic figure skating champion Dick Button. He shopped the idea to all three US television networks, and ABC bought it as a special for the winter of 1973. The first Superstars competition was held in Rotonda West, Florida in February 1973.

Bob Seagren, an Olympic pole vault gold medalist, was the first winner. However, it was heavyweight champion boxer Joe Frazier who nearly stole the show. In the very first event, the 50 meter swimming heats, Frazier nearly drowned, and only after he was retrieved from the pool did he admit to commentators that he didn't know how to swim. When a reporter asked him why he tried the race, Frazier replied, "How was I to know I couldn't unless I tried it?" He also famously opined, "That Mark Spitz," (who had won seven gold medals for swimming at the 1972 Olympics) "is a tough muthafucker!"

Spin-offs included a women's version of the show, and a Superteams version, where the two World Series and Super Bowl teams each faced off (except the New York Yankees, whose owner at the time, George Steinbrenner, prohibited his players from competing, so in years where the Yankees were in the World Series, their league's runner-up competed instead), with the winners competing in the finals. There were also brief runs of versions for celebrities and for juniors, where each state's Department of Education was asked to nominate one high school, and those schools each sent one boy and one girl to qualifying rounds, with the final aired on TV.

The show remained popular in the 1970s, but ratings declined and the last edition produced by ABC came in 1984. NBC Sports picked up the program the next year and carried it from 1985 to 1990. ABC took the show back in 1991, and broadcast it through 1994. During a three-year period (1991–1993) the event was held in Cancun, Mexico. The competitions were held in different areas of Cancun Palace and Melia Cancun hotels. During that period former great NFL players Frank Gifford, Dan Dierdorf and Lynn Swann worked as commentators of the Superstars Tournament.

There was no American version for three years (1995–1997); then ABC revived the show in 1998 and broadcast it through 2002. CBS Sports picked up the show the next year.

Several athletes won the event two or more times. Among them:

- Kyle Rote, Jr., Soccer (1974, 1976, 1977)
- Renaldo Nehemiah, track and field/American football (1981–83, 1986)
- Herschel Walker, American football (1987–88)
- Willie Gault, American football (1989–90)
- Dave Johnson, decathlon (1993–94)
- Jason Sehorn, American football (1998–2000)

Speed skater Anne Henning won three straight women's competitions (1976–78). Basketball player Ann Meyers matched that feat in 1981 through 1983. Volleyball player Linda Fernandez won two straight events in 1979 and 1980.

== List of champions ==
Year	Athlete	Sport	State
1973	Bob Seagren	Pole vault	California
1974	Kyle Rote, Jr.	Soccer	Texas
1975	O. J. Simpson	Football	California
1976	Kyle Rote, Jr.	Soccer	Texas
1977	Kyle Rote, Jr.	Soccer	Texas
1978	Wayne Grimditch	Water Skiing	Florida
1979	Greg Pruitt	Football	Texas
1980	Charles White	Football	California
1981	Renaldo Nehemiah	Track and field	New Jersey
1982	Renaldo Nehemiah	Track and field	New Jersey
1983	Renaldo Nehemiah	Football	New Jersey
1984	Tom Petranoff	Javelin	Illinois
1985	Mark Gastineau	Football	Oklahoma
1986	Renaldo Nehemiah	Football	New Jersey
1987	Herschel Walker	Football	Georgia
1988	Herschel Walker	Football	Georgia
1989	Willie Gault	Football	Georgia
1990	Willie Gault	Football	Georgia
1991	Kelly Gruber	Baseball	Texas
1992	Mike Powell	Long Jump	Pennsylvania
1993	Dave Johnson	Decathlon	North Dakota
1994	Dave Johnson	Decathlon	North Dakota
1995–1997: Competition Not Held
1998	Jason Sehorn	Football	California
1999	Jason Sehorn	Football	California
2000	Jason Sehorn	Football	California
2001	Hermann Maier	Alpine Skiing	Austria
2002	Bode Miller	Alpine Skiing	New Hampshire
2003	Jeremy Bloom	Freestyle Skiing	Colorado

== World Superstars ==
=== 1977 – Callaway Gardens, Georgia, US ===
1977 World Superstars Championship Final Result

Place	Athlete	Sport	Country
1st	Bob Seagren	Pole vault	United States
2nd	Kjell Isaksson	Pole Vault	Sweden
3rd	Peter Snell	1500 metres	New Zealand

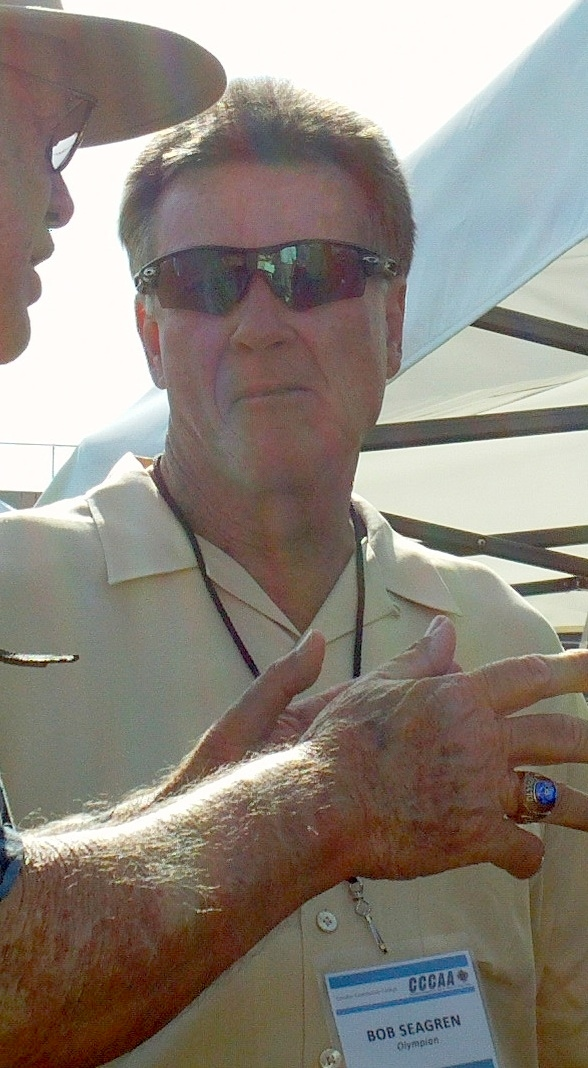
Bob Seagren won the inaugural World Superstars Championship at Callaway Gardens in Georgia in 1977

In 1976, following the success of the Superstars in the US, Britain and mainland Europe, Dick Button and ABC decided to organize a World Superstars Final, to be held the following March at Callaway Gardens in Georgia.

The participants in the inaugural "World Superstars Championship" were to be the competitors from across the various national and continental versions of the show with the best records in the previous years, and as such the US was to be represented by its previous national champions Bob Seagren, O. J. Simpson, and three time reigning current champion Kyle Rote, Jr. The rest of the participants were to be drawn from the top six finishers from the 1976 European Superstars final, the top six from the US version in 1977, and the winner of the 1976 Canadian Superstars event. In reality, as was always an issue for Superstars, several competitors withdrew in the weeks before the contest, with Rote and Simpson pulling out just a week before taping, leaving a slightly weakened field headed by Seagren, double European champion Kjell Isaksson, Canadian champion Tony Gabriel and the joint runners-up from the US final Guy Drut and Dave Casper.

Aside from the withdrawals of Rote and Simpson the other major omission from the field was the double British champion and 1975 European runner-up David Hemery who was studying at university in the US, and had failed to qualify for the 1976 European final after finishing a narrow third in his heat. Had he paddled his Kayak 0.4 seconds faster or scored two more points in the pistol shooting he would have made the final, and with other strong European challengers (like Ties Kruize, Kevin Keegan and Björn Borg) also absent, the European challenge was significantly poorer.

The contest started with rowing, where Peter Snell capitalized on a mistake from fellow athlete Frank Nusse to win the first ten points, then the soccer penalty shoot-out. Here Gareth Edwards was one kick away from winning nearly $5,000, but he fluffed his final shot and had to settle for a five-way tie for second place, while Guy Drut easily won the play-off, and took the money. After this it became a two-way contest between the two pole-vaulters, Isaksson and Seagren.

Controversially, Seagren (by nature of being retired from IAAF competition) was allowed to run in the track and field events, while Isaksson was not. Seagren later admitted that this gave him a major advantage over his younger, Swedish rival, as running was a fundamental part of any pole-vaulter's training regime, and thus they had to be favored in such events. While Seagren was unable to win the 100 yard sprint, he did score two points, and his win in the half-mile race gave him a further ten. Isaksson countered with a win in the gym tests and two second-place finishes in the bike race and weightlifting. Seagren however kept competing strongly and his victory in the swimming and second place in the gym tests saw him take a 33 points to 30 lead over Snell and Isaksson into the final event: the obstacle course.

This event was not held in Europe, and therefore Isaksson was attempting it for the first time. In the heats Isaksson ran a time of 25.81 seconds, while Snell was far behind with 29.2 seconds. Seagren however, with much more experience in the event, ran 0.8 seconds faster than the Swede, finishing in 24.64 seconds. His loss in the final to record holder Lynn Swann was irrelevant; the seven points for second place made him the first World Superstars Champion, and won him $37,000 in the process.

=== 1978 – Freeport, Bahamas ===
1978 World Superstars Championship Final Result

Place	Athlete	Sport	Country
1st	Brian Budd	Soccer	Canada
2nd	Bob Seagren	Pole vault	United States
3rd	Greg Pruitt	American football	United States

With the Superstars franchise nearing its zenith of popularity, the World Championship returned in 1978 with a 12-man field consisting of the national champions from Canada, Australia and New Zealand, the top three finishers from the 1977 European Superstars final, and the top five from the 1978 US National Championship. Completing the line-up was the returning champion, Bob Seagren.

Though the 1977 runner-up Kjell Isaksson was missing (he would not compete in Superstars again until 1980), Europe was strongly represented by Jean-Paul Coche, Keith Fielding and Ties Kruize, while Wayne Grimditch, Greg Pruitt and Dwight Stones (who could famously jump up the 10-feet high obstacle course wall in one stride) represented the US. It was the Canadian champion however, Brian Budd, who would completely dominate the contest, and World Superstars for the next three years.

Budd was multifaceted as an athlete, his soccer training covering swimming, running, bike racing and gym work. He also understood that the key to winning Superstars was to win as many points as possible in the events you were good at, and to hold on for as many points as possible in the others. He turned out to be nearly unbeatable in the gym, half-mile race and the swimming, and more than competent in cycling and rowing. In 1978 he won 44 points from these five events alone, ten points more than he needed to become World Champion.

In the 100-yard dash, joint favourites Greg Pruitt and Keith Fielding were both unbeaten in the 100 yards/metres, and a fabulous race was in prospect. Budd got off to a blistering start – according to the UK commentator Ron Pickering it was 'a flyer' – and led in the first 30 yards, but Pruitt, then Fielding accelerated, and the two had a large lead over the rest of the field. As they approached the finish line, Fielding pulled onto Pruitt's shoulder, then leaned as the two crossed the line together. Without photo-finish equipment the result had to be called from hand-timing only. Fielding was given a time of 9.97 seconds; Pruitt had officially run 9.96. Fielding believed he had won, as did the BBC commentators covering the final. Fielding's challenge was teetering, and in the half-mile run the searing Caribbean heat and a crazy pace he had attempted to catch up with Budd cost him physically; he collapsed of heat exhaustion and had to receive first aid and oxygen from Ron Pickering at track-side.

Fielding finished fifth, making him the highest-placing European competitor. Bob Seagren Placed second, finishing 14 points behind the winner, Budd. Budd, representing Canada, secured the overall victory and went on to win the event for the following two years.

=== 1979 – Freeport, Bahamas ===
1979 World Superstars Championship Final Result

Place	Athlete	Sport	Country
1st	Brian Budd	Soccer	Canada
2nd	Wayne Grimditch	Water Skiing	United States
3rd	Greg Pruitt	American football	United States

The third World Championship was held in March 1979, again in the sweltering heat of Freeport, Bahamas. Budd returned as reigning World and Canadian champion (and strong favourite) with Pruitt back as well, but this time as US National Champion. The European challenge was again restricted by injury and conflicting commitments, and was restricted to three competitors: UK runner-ups Lynn Davies and Dave Boy Green and Irish Superstars champion Pat Spillane.

The 1979 European Superstars final had finished with Ties Kruize and Brian Jacks joint-winners, but both had missed out on The Bahamas through injury. If Europe was perhaps under represented, then the US challenge was as formidable as ever, with Pruitt, Wayne Grimditch, Jim Taylor and Joe Theismann all qualifying. Completing the line-up were two invited challengers – not Hemery, Isaksson, Fielding or Kyle Rote though. Instead the organizers had asked both Emerson Fittipaldi and Rafael Septién to "make up the numbers", even though only Fittipaldi had ever entered Superstars before, both in the US and Europe, but neither time with any success. They did however represent Brazil and Mexico respectively, and thus increase the media interest in the contest in Latin America. They would have little impact on the final.

That was not the case for Budd, who dominated again, winning three events comprehensively, setting new records in the swimming and half-mile run in the process. He also finished third in every other event he competed in, winning the title by thirteen points this time. While Grimditch and Pruitt won multiple events, they could not match Budd's consistency. Neither could the best European, Lynn Davies, who finished second in four events but disappointed in the weightlifting and gym tests. In the end only two points separated second to fourth, with Grimditch beating Pruitt for second on count-back, and Davies two points back in fourth.

=== 1980 – Freeport, Bahamas ===
1980 World Superstars Championship Final Result

Place	Athlete	Sport	Country
1st	Brian Budd	Soccer	Canada
2nd	John Sherwood	400-metre hurdles	Great Britain (United Kingdom)
3rd	Brian Jacks	Judo	Great Britain (United Kingdom)

Brian Budd won by the largest margin ever in the World Championship, winning three of the sports and finishing second in four. Because this was his third consecutive championship, he was not allowed to participate in any more Superstars competitions.

=== 1981 – Key Biscayne, Florida, US ===
1981 World Superstars Championship Final Result

Place	Athlete	Sport	Country
1st	Jody Scheckter	Auto racing	South Africa
2nd	Declan Burns	Kayaking	Republic of Ireland
3rd	Russ Francis	American football	United States

=== 1982 – Key Biscayne, Florida, US ===
1982 World Superstars Championship Final Result

Place	Athlete	Sport	Country
1st	Brian Hooper	Pole vault	Great Britain (United Kingdom)
2nd	James Lofton	American football	United States
3rd	Cris Collinsworth	American football	United States

=== List of World Superstars Champions ===
Year	Athlete	Sport	Country
1977	Bob Seagren	Pole vault	United States
1978	Brian Budd	Soccer	Canada
1979	Brian Budd	Soccer	Canada
1980	Brian Budd	Soccer	Canada
1981	Jody Scheckter	Auto racing	South Africa
1982	Brian Hooper	Pole Vault	Great Britain (United Kingdom)

== Gameplay ==
=== Obstacle course variations ===
The obstacle course was introduced in 1974 as the final event of the competition. The Superteams version featured the obstacle course as an earlier event. The original course had the contestants climb a 12' rope wall, run through a tubular tunnel, push a blocking sled (or traverse across monkey bars in the Women's and Superteams versions), cleanly step through two rows of tires (originally 9, later increased to 2 even rows of 6), jump over a 12' water hazard (rectangular pool of water), clear a 4'6" high bar, jump two sets of hurdles and cross the FINISH line. Penalty seconds were added for missing tires, stepping in the water hazard and knocking down the high bar. Some athletes have shown super skills on this course by climbing the wall without using the rope and clearing the high bar like a hurdle.

For the 2009 "elimination event" version, contestants have to climb a rope wall, duck under four rope hurdles (2 sets side-by-side) (this was changed mid-season to a balance beam just over 3-inches wide), cleanly step through a bungee grid, ascend and descend a large ramp, push through a large door-like block, jump two sets of hurdles, run through a cargo net and cross the FINISH line.

=== SuperTeams ===
From 1975 until 1983, a second team-based competition was held as an accompaniment to the annual Superstars competition. The SuperTeams, as it was dubbed, was a three-week competition as presented on television. In the first two weeks, two matches were conducted with one featuring the teams from the previous year’s World Series and the other featuring the teams that played in the previous year’s Super Bowl. The winners then faced each other to determine an overall winner. The only exception was in the final competition, where only one match was conducted.

The SuperTeams employees all the Superstars events, with some team events added such as Hawaiian rowing and the Tug-of-War. There were, however, variations due to the format being team based and not individual based. The running, swimming, and cycling events were relays, with the cycling done on tandem bicycles. The obstacle course's blocking sleds were replaced with monkey bars, due to the perceived advantage the football teams had with using them. The team that won the most events over the course of the competition was declared the winner.

In the 1978 final, the Dallas Cowboys and Kansas City Royals split the first six events, so the tug-of-war would decide the winner. However, while there was a time limit in the preliminary rounds, there was none in the final, and after 75 minutes in which neither team came particularly close to winning, the organizers declared the event (and, as a result, the competition) a tie.

In three of the SuperTeams competitions, the World Series teams were not fully represented. In those three years, the New York Yankees were the American League representative. After the team participated in the 1977 edition, team owner George Steinbrenner refused to allow his players to compete in any further extracurricular athletic competitions; he also was not pleased with the timing of the events as they were conducted in February each year, which interfered with the start of baseball’s spring training. The 1978, 1979, and 1982 competitions were affected; in those years the team the Yankees defeated in the American League Championship Series took their place. The Kansas City Royals participated in and won the first two of those three competitions, while the Oakland Athletics participated in and won the other.

The Pittsburgh Steelers represented the NFL in four SuperTeams competitions, winning once. The Dallas Cowboys participated three times, also winning once. The Minnesota Vikings, Oakland Raiders and Miami Dolphins each participated twice; none of those teams managed to win.

The Los Angeles Dodgers competed in the most competitions for Major League Baseball, winning the 1975 event and returning in 1978, 1979, and 1982. The Kansas City Royals, the only multiple winner, entered in three competitions, their winning 1978 and 1979 efforts and a return trip in 1981. Baseball was also represented twice each by the Cincinnati Reds, in 1976 and 1977, and the Oakland Athletics, in 1975 and 1982. The other participants were the aforementioned Yankees (1977), the Boston Red Sox (1976), the Baltimore Orioles (1980), the Pittsburgh Pirates (also 1980), the Philadelphia Phillies (1981), and the St. Louis Cardinals (1983).

==== SuperTeams winners ====
- 1975: Los Angeles Dodgers
- 1976: Pittsburgh Steelers
- 1977: Cincinnati Reds
- 1978: (tie) Dallas Cowboys and Kansas City Royals
- 1979: Kansas City Royals
- 1980: Los Angeles Rams
- 1981: Philadelphia Eagles
- 1982: Oakland Athletics
- 1983: Washington Redskins

== 2009 revival edition ==
In 2009 the franchise was revived for ABC. The Superstars paired athletes and celebrities to compete as a team. Kristi Leskinen (Freestyle Skiing) and Maksim Chmerkovskiy (Ballroom Dancing) won the competition.

=== Filming ===
On January 6, 2009, Variety reported that Juma Entertainment and Blue Entertainment Sports TV would produce a six-week series on ABC starting on June 23, 2009 featuring pairing of celebrities and athletes with one pair being eliminated each week. Principal location filming took place in the Bahamas.

=== Participants ===
The participating stars were:

Place	Athlete	Celebrity
1	Kristi Leskinen	Maksim Chmerkovskiy
2	Bode Miller	Paige Hemmis
3	Lisa Leslie	David Charvet
4	Brandi Chastain	Julio Iglesias Jr.
5	Jeff Kent	Ali Landry
Terrell WD	Terrell Owens	Joanna Krupa
7	Robert Horry	Estella Warren
Dan WD	Lisa Leslie	Dan Cortese
Jennifer WD	Jennifer Capriati	David Charvet

=== Judges' scoring summary ===
indicates the team eliminated.
indicates the team withdrew.
indicates the teams that went to the Obstacle Course.
indicates the team that won the rubber match.
indicates the winning team.
indicates the runner-up team.
indicates the third place team.

Couple	Place	1	2	3	4	5	6
Kristi & Maks	1	Safe	Safe	Safe	Safe	Safe	Winner
Bode & Paige	2	Safe	OC	OC	Safe	Safe	Runner-up
Lisa & David	3	Safe	Safe	OC	OC	OC	Third
Brandi & Julio	4	Safe	OC	Safe	Safe	ELIM	
Jeff & Ali	5	Safe	OC	ELIM	ELIM		
Terrell & Joanna	6	ELIM	Safe	OC	WD		
Robert & Estella	7	OC	ELIM				
Lisa & Dan	N/A	OC	WD				
Jennifer & David	N/A	OC	WD				

An early leaked clip showed Supermodel Joanna Krupa displeased with the performance of her teammate, Terrell Owens. This occurs in the first episode, during an elimination competition involving the obstacle course in which Owens gets tangled in the cargo net obstacle and loses a race. Lisa Leslie also struggled with the cargo net obstacle to the point that she became disoriented and reversed her direction, exiting the obstacle in the wrong direction and almost racing towards an obstacle she had already completed. These two teams (Owens/Krupa v. Leslie/Cortese) then go into a final race to determine who goes home. Although Owens performed better this time, Cortese stayed close enough behind him that Krupa was unable to outrace Leslie and Owens/Krupa were the first team eliminated from the competition. Krupa continued to vent her frustration and disappointment in Owens's performance well after the race was over, stating that she expected better results from such a well-known athlete. They had lost a kayak race earlier. A better performance in any of the events (the duathlon, in which they finished middle-of-the-pack, two kayak races that they lost, and two obstacle course races that they lost) would have permitted them to stay in the competition. However, there was no explanation as to why Owens/Krupa with their fourth-place finish (20 points ahead of two teams that tied for fifth place) were even in a "tiebreak" situation to begin with, and the show was also silent on what tiebreaker separated the two fifth-place teams, sending one to the obstacle course automatically while putting the other in a "rubber match" kayak race against Owens/Krupa—who clearly finished 20 points ahead of the fifth-place teams in the standings.

Along with Leslie/Cortese, Capriati/Charvet also struggled during the first round of competitions; most significant was Capriati missing the exchange of the bike between the teammates in the first event (a 1.1 mile duathlon) when she failed to spot it propped against a barricade where her partner had left it for her, and had to run nearly the entire distance of the road course.

In the second episode, the Capriati/Charvet team was disbanded after Capriati had been injured, and Owens and Krupa were allowed back on the show to compete in their stead. Dan Cortese withdrew from the competition due to an injury during the second episode, and he was replaced by Charvet as Leslie's partner.

The hosting cast is ESPN's John Saunders, former NFL All-Pro defensive tackle Warren Sapp, and NFL sideline reporter, fitness model, and TV host Jenn Brown (an accomplished athlete in her own right, having captained the University of Florida softball team).
