= Masters Water Ski Tournament =

Masters Water Ski Tournament

The Masters Water Ski Tournament is an annual water ski competition that has taken place since 1959. Competed each year on Memorial Day weekend, the event is held at Robin Lake in the Callaway Gardens resort area outside of Pine Mountain, Georgia. The tournament is one of the sport's oldest major championships along with the Water Ski World Championships (since 1949) and the U.S. National Water Ski Championships (since 1939). The inaugural tournament saw Joe Cash and Nancie Rideout winning the overall event.
