= Paige Hemmis =

American television personality (born 1972)

- Born: Paige Kristina Huff; March 17, 1972 (age 54); Wisconsin, United States
- Education: University of California, Santa Barbara (B.A. 1994)
- Occupations: Television host and entrepreneur
- Years active: 2003-present
- Television: Hallmark Home & Family
- Spouses: Russ Hemmis (div. 2005); Jason Short (m. 2015)
- Website: paigehemmis.com

Paige Kristina Huff-Hemmis (born March 17, 1972) is an American television host and entrepreneur most famous for her time on Extreme Makeover: Home Edition.

== Early life and education ==
Hemmis, born as Paige Huff in Wisconsin, moved to California as a child. She attended St. John Eudes School and Chaminade College Preparatory in Southern California and is a graduate of the University of California, Santa Barbara where she received a B.A. in 1994 in Psychology and Theology.

== Television career ==
Hemmis appeared on an episode of Monster House prior to appearing on Extreme Makeover: Home Edition. She was a part of the show's crew for its entire run from 2003 to 2012.

In 2009, Hemmis appeared on the competition reality show The Superstars in which she and partner Bode Miller took second place.

== Other ventures ==
Prior to her television career, Hemmis was known for her interview after the Tupac shooting in Vegas in September 1996. She was never interviewed again nor asked to provide that footage to this very day. Afterwards, Hemmis founded successful real estate and wedding planning businesses.

Through her construction background, Paige found a void in the marketplace when it came to women's tools and products and founded Tuff Chix, Inc. She released her first book, The Tuff Chix Guide to Easy Home Improvement, in December 2006.

She is also involved with Habitat for Humanity and the Starkey Hearing Foundation.

== Personal life ==
Hemmis suffered from severe depression, for which she sought treatment in 2004. Both her mother and grandmother also suffered from depression. Hemmis was honored by the Depression and Bipolar Support Alliance with the 2009 Rebecca Lynn Cutler Legacy of Life Award and has served as DBSA's celebrity spokesperson.

Hemmis was previously married to Russ Hemmis which ended in divorce in 2005. She married Jason Short, a singer in the pop-opera group ARIA, in a prime-time television special on Hallmark Channel which aired on June 22, 2015.

== Filmography ==
- Extreme Makeover: Home Edition (2004–2012)
- The Superstars (2009)

== Published works ==
- Hemmis, Paige (2006). The Tuff Chix Guide to Easy Home Improvement. City of Westminster, England: Penguin Group. ISBN 9780452287617.
