= Mike Seipel =

American barefoot water skier

- Born: Mike Seipel; 1960 (age 65–66); Wisconsin
- Citizenship: United States
- Occupation: Professional Barefoot Waterskiier
- Spouse: Gwen
- Children: Kimberly

Mike Seipel (born Mike Seipel; 1960) is a retired American competitive barefoot water skier. He was considered to be one of the greatest barefoot water skiers in the world. He was a member of the United States Barefoot Team and was a two-time overall world champion in 1984-85 and 1986–87. Seipel didn't win any medals at his first Worlds, but he launched a sports career that would eventually earn him 11 National titles, six World titles and nine World records. He skied on eight U.S. Barefoot Water Ski Teams and has since trained numerous National and World champions at his Barefoot International Ski School. Mike invented the inverted barefoot jumping technique, which he first attempted in competition at the world championships in 1990. This technique is now used by all the top competitors around the world and has allowed the world record to be extended up to almost 30m. Mike was also well known for being the first footer to do tricks like one-foot 360 turns and a stepover back-to-front feet-to-feet in competition.

== Tournament results ==
=== US National Championships ===
- 1980 Overall Champion
- 1981 Overall Champion
- 1982 Overall Champion
- 1987 Overall Champion

=== World championships ===
- 1984 Overall Champion
- 1985 Overall Champion
- 1986 Overall Champion
- 1987 Overall Champion

== See also ==
- List of Water Skiing Hall of Fame Inductees
