= U.S. National Water Ski Championships =

Annual water ski competition

The U.S. National Water Ski Championships is an annual water ski competition that has taken place since 1939. Hosted by the American Water Ski Association (AWSA) and taking place every year since its inception, with the exception of 1942–1945, the competition is the oldest and longest-running water ski competition in the world. The U.S. Nationals is one of the sport's three major championships along with the Water Ski World Championships (since 1949), and the Masters Water Ski Tournament (since 1959).
