= Karen Morse (water skier) =

British water skier

Karen Morse MBE is a British water skier who was a British and European gold medalist.

== Biography ==
Morse is from Walton-on-Thames in England and started water skiing when she was eight years old. Morse started representing Britain in international water skiing events starting in 1971, and participated in the 1972 Summer Olympics when water skiing was a demonstration sport. She was the overall champion at the European junior championship event in 1974, and the British overall champion in 1975. In 1976 she won a gold medal in the individual event at the European water skiing championship. In 1981 Morse won the British women's national title, and took honors in the slalom and jump events. In 1986, Morse took gold medals in both the slalom and the jump events at the European championship, and won a bronze medal in 1986 at the KP World Masters event. At the 1987 world championship she earned a bronze medal in the team competition and a silver in the jump event.

== Awards and honors ==
Morse has an MBE in recognition of her work in realm of water skiing.
