= Andy Ripley =

England international rugby union footballer

- Born: Andrew George Ripley; 1 December 1947 Liverpool, Lancashire, England
- Died: 17 June 2010 (aged 62)

Rugby union career
- Position: No. 8
Senior career
Years	Team	Apps	(Points)
- Rosslyn Park
International career
Years	Team	Apps	(Points)
1972–1976	England	24	(Pts:8; Tries:2; Conv:0; Pens:0; Drop:0)

Andrew George Ripley OBE (1 December 1947 – 17 June 2010) was an English rugby union international, who represented England from 1972 to 1976, and the Lions on their unbeaten 1974 tour of South Africa.

== Early life ==
Ripley was born in Liverpool, Lancashire, his family moved to Bristol where he attended Westbury Park Primary School and Greenway Secondary Modern School, he continued his education at the University of East Anglia, London School of Economics (M.Sc.) and Hughes Hall, Cambridge (MPhil). His lifelong career was as a chartered accountant.

== Rugby career ==
Ripley played for the Rosslyn Park club for his entire career.

He made his international debut on 15 January 1972 at Twickenham in the England vs Wales match. Of the 24 matches he played for his national side, he was on the winning side on eight occasions.

Between June 1972 and November 1973 England defeated the three major Southern Hemisphere countries, Ripley playing in all three games. On 3 June 1972 England beat South Africa 18–9 at Ellis Park, Johannesburg. On 15 September 1973 they defeated the All Blacks 16–10 at Eden Park, Auckland, and on 17 November the same year they beat Australia 20–3 at Twickenham, Ripley scoring a try.

Ripley was a member of the unbeaten 1974 Lions, although the test starting role was taken by Mervyn Davies.

He played his final match for England on 21 February 1976, at Murrayfield, in the Scotland vs England match.

He also played in a Presidents XV.

Ripley was the captain of the Barbarians team that competed in the 1981 Hong Kong Sevens, a team that included Les Cusworth and Peter Wheeler. The Barbarians won the Cup Final 12–10 against Australia and in doing so became the first team from the Northern Hemisphere to win the Hong Kong Sevens.

== Superstars ==
Ripley took part in several Superstars competitions between 1981 and 1983, winning his British Superstars heat and International Superstars in 1981. He also represented the UK in the 1981 World Championship and the 1982 International.

A tremendously strong runner, Ripley dominated the 800 metres contest, winning this race in the 1981 World final and in most Superstars events he entered. Tall and muscular, Ripley had enormous stamina and also performed well in the canoeing or rowing events; again he won this event in the World Final, setting a new record time in the process.

As was the case with other British Superstars of the era, Ripley could not attempt to win the events by picking up points in every event – he had to use the popular tactic of scoring as highly in his 'banker' events as possible, and holding on in the others. Unfortunately for Ripley his size proved to be a disadvantage in the gymnasium tests – he was too big to contemplate parallel bar dips or squat thrusts and while he could lift prodigious amounts in the weightlifting, his heavy bodyweight meant that smaller athletes would always win using the coefficient system. He could also have used a little luck – a puncture right at the start of the 1981 British Final cycling race cost him eight valuable points, and any chance of the title. Instead it went to Keith Fielding, his former England Rugby Sevens teammate.

Undoubtedly Ripley's finest hour in Superstars came in Israel in the 1981 International, when he gained revenge on Fielding and won the prestigious title. He defended his title a year later in Hong Kong, but could not defeat the best European Superstar of all-time, Brian Hooper, finishing second. With the contest as much about camaraderie as athletic prowess for many of the competitors however, Ripley's outgoing, larger-than-life persona fitted in very well. His final appearance in Superstars came in the 1983 UK Past Masters event, where he again finished runner-up, this time to another former champion David Hemery.

=== Superstars record ===
Year	Event	Position
1981	British Heat 2	1st
1981	British Final	2nd
1981	International	1st
1981	World Final	3rd
1982	International	2nd
1983	UK Past Masters	2nd

== Honours ==
Ripley was awarded the OBE in the 2010 Birthday Honours.

In 1998, he became an indoor rowing world record holder in the 50–54 yrs age-group on the Concept2 ergometer (2000m in 6:07.7).

Ripley won the 'Best Rugby Book' category of the 2008 British Sports Book Awards for his memoir Ripley's World.

== Death ==
Ripley was diagnosed with prostate cancer in 2005, and died on 17 June 2010.
