= Ralph Samuelson =

Inventor of water skiing

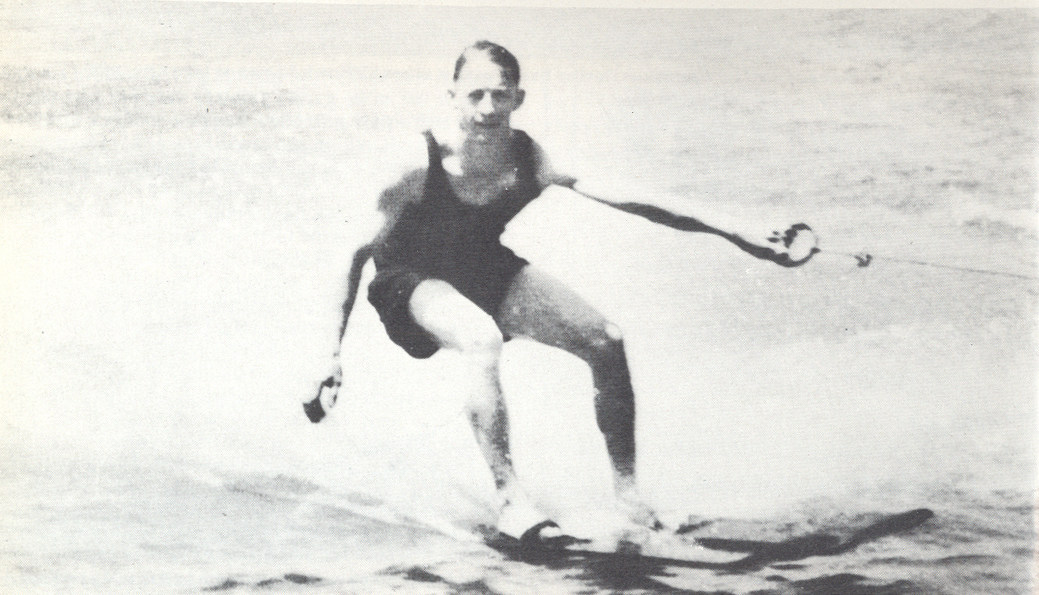
- Born: Ralph Wilford Samuelson; July 3, 1903
- Died: August 28, 1977 (aged 74)
- Known for: Invention of water skiing

Ralph Wilford Samuelson (July 3, 1903 – August 28, 1977) was the inventor of water skiing, which he first performed in the summer of 1922 in Lake City, Minnesota, just before his 19th birthday. Samuelson was already skilled at aquaplaning—standing on a board while being pulled by a powerboat—but he hoped to create something like snow skiing on the water. Lake Pepin, a wide portion of the Mississippi River between Minnesota and Wisconsin, was the venue for his experiments.

== Patent ==
Samuelson did not patent his invention, nor was his work sufficiently publicized at the time to prevent U.S. Patent 1,559,390 for water skis from being subsequently issued, on October 27, 1925, to prolific inventor Fred Waller of Huntington, New York. Waller marketed his product as "Dolphin Akwa-Skees". Waller later invented the cinema widescreen motion picture system, and in 1952's This Is Cinerama, the first feature film released in the panoramic format, water skiing at Cypress Gardens, Florida, was a prominently featured subject. Famed journalist Lowell Thomas was an early investor in Cinerama, and in his introduction to the book Water Skiing (1958, Prentice-Hall), by Dick Pope, Sr., creator of Cypress Gardens, Thomas described the connection between Waller and water skiing's prominence as a subject in the motion picture. In several instances in the book, Pope reiterates—erroneously, we now know—that Waller was the first to invent water skis.

== Early attempts ==
Samuelson's early attempts included using staves from wooden barrels and snow skis before he created new skis made of pine boards 8 feet long and 9 inches wide (240 × 23 cm). He bent up the front tips after softening the wood by boiling them in his mother's copper kettle. Gaining confidence on the water, he began jumping wakes, but broke the original skis (the remains of which were believed to be found on a beach on Pepin) in one landing. His slightly modified second pair still exists; today they are at the Lake City Chamber of Commerce, in Lake City, Minnesota.

Samuelson first succeeded on June 28, 1922, by starting off wearing skis while standing on top of an aquaplane board, and then slipping one foot and then the other into the water.

== Ski jumping ==
He attracted a lot of attention locally in the following days and weeks. On July 8, 1925, Samuelson went on to perform the first ski jump on water. He fell flat in his first attempt, but soon greased the launch platform with lard and succeeded on the second try. Also that year, on August 27, 1925, he became the first speed skier as he found himself racing across the water at 80 mph (130 km/h), pulled by a Curtiss flying boat that flew just above the waves.

== Later years ==
In his later years, Samuelson moved to Pine Island, Minnesota where he was a turkey farmer. He was a guest of honor at a water skiing 50th anniversary in 1972, and was inducted into the Water Ski Hall of Fame on January 22, 1977. When he returned to Minnesota, he began to suffer the effects of cancer, and died in Pine Island on August 28, 1977.
