= Water Ski Hall of Fame and Museum =

Coordinates: 28°13′22″N 81°38′41″W

- Established: 1980
- Location: 101 Adventure Court; Davenport, Florida
- Founder: USA Water Ski Foundation

The Water Ski Hall of Fame and Museum is the hall of fame, museum, and archive of the sport of water skiing. Founded in 1980 and currently located in Davenport, Florida, the organization is administered by the USA Water Ski Foundation.

== History and Exhibits ==
Since the creation of the sport by Ralph Samuelson in 1922, water skiing has grown immensely, and USA-WSF works to document individuals and events which have significantly contributed to water skiing history. The museum houses items of memorabilia, vintage skis and related equipment, classic photos, press clippings, and highlights from historic competitions and events. From 1982 to 2012, the USA Water Ski Foundation Hall of Fame inducted 63 individuals who have made major contributions to water skiing.

The Water Ski Hall of Fame and Museum was originally established by the USA Water Ski Foundation in 1980 in Winter Haven, Florida, just a few minutes from the famed Cypress Gardens Water Ski Show. The museum is currently housed at the Central Florida Visitors & Convention Bureau Welcome Center in Davenport.

== Hall of Fame ==
The Water Ski Hall of Fame was established in 1982 to "honor and perpetuate the names and accomplishments of skiers, pioneers, and officials whose dedication and competitive achievements at National and International levels brought lasting fame to the sport of water skiing". The Hall of Fame admits four categories of individuals: competitive water skiers, water skiing pioneers, water skiing officials, and show skiers.
