= Water Ski World Championships =

Bi-annual sports competition

- Status: Active
- Genre: Global sports event
- Frequency: Biannual
- Inaugurated: 1949
- Organiser: International Waterski & Wakeboard Federation and Cable Wakeboard World Council (CWWC)

The Water Ski World Championships is a bi-annual water ski competition that has taken place since 1949 by International Waterski & Wakeboard Federation. Held near the end of the competition season, the World Championships are one of the sport's oldest major championships along with the Masters Water Ski Tournament (since 1959) and the U.S. National Water Ski Championships (since 1939).

== Types of Water Ski World Championships ==
1. Slalom, Trick, Jump Skiing since 1949
2. Slalom, Trick, Jump Skiing (Junior) since 1986
3. Slalom, Trick, Jump Skiing (U21) since 2003
4. Slalom, Trick, Jump Skiing (+35) since 2010
5. Barefoot Skiing since 1978
6. Barefoot Skiing (Junior) since 1995
7. Cable Skiing since 1988 or 1998
8. Cable Wakeboarding since 2001
9. Adaptive Skiing since 1993
10. Ski Racing since 1979
11. Racing since 2019

== Results ==
- "History Of Results – IWWF Waterski Europe". www.waterskieurope.eu.
- "Historie - Menü". www.sport-komplett.de.
- "Index of ./". www.iwsf.com.
- "iwwfed-ea.org - Waterski competition results". www.iwwfed-ea.org.
- "iwwfed-ea.org - Waterski competition results". www.iwwfed-ea.org.
- "Sportarten". www.sport-komplett.de.
- "IWSF World Champions". Archived from the original on 12 February 2006.

== Medals by country ==
IWSF Titles and Medal List

=== World Championships for Water Skiing (1949-2019) ===
IWSF Titles and Medal List

Country	Gold	Silver	Bronze	Total
USA	165	99	107	371
FRA	29	43	37	109
AUS	17	40	36	93
DEN	31	25	29	85
GBR	15	19	21	55
ITA	6	16	12	34
BLR	7	8	14	29
VEN	8	10	6	24
MEX	7	6	6	19
AUT	2	6	9	17
SUI	4	6	5	15
BEL	3	3	6	12
CZE	3	4	2	9
RUS	6	3	0	9
SWE	4	3	2	9
GRE	3	4	1	8
URS	3	3	1	7
ARG	1	3	2	6
CHI	2	1	2	5
LUX	2	2	1	5
GER	0	1	4	5
LEB	0	4	1	5
HOL	1	1	1	3
DEN	0	2	1	3
LIB	0	2	1	3
NZE	0	2	1	3
SAF	0	0	3	3
ESP	1	0	1	2
FIN	0	2	0	2
NZL	0	1	1	2
TCH	0	1	1	2
COL	0	0	2	2
FRG	0	1	0	1
PER	0	1	0	1
ISR	0	0	1	1

=== World Championships for Barefoot (1978-2016) ===
Country	Gold	Silver	Bronze	Total
AUS	59	66	59	184
USA	66	60	51	177
GBR	16	7	17	40
NZL	4	12	10	26
RSA	9	6	8	23
DEN	1	1	5	7
NOR	0	2	3	5
FRA	1	0	3	4
GER	1	1	2	4
ITA	0	2	1	3
SUI	0	0	1	1

=== Junior World Championships for Barefoot (1995-2016) ===
Country	Gold	Silver	Bronze	Total
AUS	59	66	59	184
USA	66	60	51	177
GBR	16	7	17	40
NZL	4	12	10	26
RSA	9	6	8	23
DEN	1	1	5	7
NOR	0	2	3	5
FRA	1	0	3	4
GER	1	1	2	4
ITA	0	2	1	3
SUI	0	0	1	1

=== Senior World Championships for Barefoot (2010-2016) ===
Country	Gold	Silver	Bronze	Total
USA	5	18	22	45
AUS	19	7	4	30
GER	5	7	6	18
NZL	5	2	3	10
DEN	1	1	2	4
FIN	0	1	1	2
GBR	1	0	0	1

=== World Championships for Adaptive (1993-2019) ===
Country	Gold	Silver	Bronze	Total
USA	165	119	89	373
GBR	148	55	45	248
AUS	89	61	56	206
ITA	53	47	18	118
FRA	19	29	23	71
SUI	16	21	19	56
BEL	22	16	5	43
NOR	7	15	13	35
DEN	8	8	16	32
NED	19	6	4	29
DEN	10	11	7	28
IRL	9	8	8	25
MEX	16	4	0	20
SWE	1	8	10	19
NZL	3	9	1	13
ARG	4	1	0	5
DAN	2	2	1	5
RSA	1	3	1	5
GER	1	2	1	4
HOL	1	2	1	4
BRA	0	0	2	2
ESP	1	0	0	1
JOR	0	0	1	1
SIN	0	0	1	1

=== U21 World Championships for Water Skiing (2003-2019) ===
Country	Gold	Silver	Bronze	Total
USA	35	19	16	70
DEN	12	16	7	35
FRA	8	11	15	34
AUS	10	6	5	21
GBR	7	1	3	11
CZE	0	7	3	10
BLR	1	4	4	9
ITA	0	3	6	9
UKR	3	2	3	8
CHI	2	1	4	7
GER	1	2	2	5
SWE	1	0	4	5
SUI	0	2	2	4
PER	1	1	0	2
AUT	0	2	0	2
NOR	0	1	1	2
POL	0	1	1	2
ESP	0	0	2	2
COL	0	1	0	1
DOM	0	1	0	1
DEN	0	0	1	1
GRE	0	0	1	1
MEX	0	0	1	1

=== Junior World Championships for Water Skiing (1986-2018) ===
Country	Gold	Silver	Bronze	Total
USA	72	45	38	155
DEN	19	22	18	59
FRA	17	17	21	55
GBR	8	13	12	33
AUS	11	12	4	27
ITA	2	4	8	14
COL	1	3	6	10
ARG	2	1	6	9
UKR	3	2	3	8
BLR	2	3	2	7
CZE	2	4	1	7
GER	2	3	2	7
MEX	2	2	3	7
CHI	2	1	3	6
GRE	1	3	2	6
SWE	0	2	4	6
URS	0	3	3	6
AUT	0	2	3	5
NZE	1	1	2	4
NZL	0	0	3	3
RSA	1	1	0	2
ESP	0	1	1	2
PER	0	1	1	2
DOM	1	0	0	1
SUI	0	1	0	1
TCH	0	1	0	1
UAE	0	1	0	1
CZR	0	0	1	1
DEN	0	0	1	1
POL	0	0	1	1

=== University World Championships for Water Skiing (2004-2016) ===
Country	Gold	Silver	Bronze	Total
USA	20	10	4	34
CZE	2	5	7	14
FRA	1	3	3	7
BEL	1	2	3	6
CHI	3	1	2	6
AUS	1	3	1	5
DEN	1	2	2	5
ITA	2	1	1	4
GER	1	2	0	3
RUS	0	2	1	3
BLR	1	0	1	2
GBR	0	0	2	2
SVK	0	0	2	2
DOM	0	1	0	1
NZE	0	1	0	1
FIN	0	0	1	1
MEX	0	0	1	1
NZL	0	0	1	1
PER	0	0	1	1

=== World Championships for Cableski (1998-2018) ===
Country	Gold	Silver	Bronze	Total
BLR	51	43	35	129
GER	9	17	10	36
AUT	10	4	5	19
SVK	2	4	12	18
ISR	5	5	5	15
CZE	1	3	5	9
POL	0	3	4	7
RUS	1	1	4	6
GBR	2	1	0	3
HUN	0	0	1	1

=== World Championships for Ski Racing (1979-2011) ===
Some medals unknown in database.

Country	Gold	Silver	Bronze	Total
AUS	43	39	20	102
USA	28	28	26	82
GBR	3	8	15	26
BEL	4	2	5	11
ITA	1	3	7	11
GB	2	1	4	7
NZL	2	1	3	6
AUT	1	0	3	4
NZ	0	1	1	2
NED	0	1	0	1

=== World Championships for Wakeboard (2001-2018) ===
Some medals unknown in database.

Country	Gold	Silver	Bronze	Total
AUS	25	19	19	63
USA	26	20	10	56
ITA	8	9	13	30
SUI	7	5	3	15
FRA	5	5	4	14
GBR	2	6	5	13
RSA	4	4	3	11
ARG	3	1	4	8
KOR	2	3	3	8
NZL	3	0	5	8
BEL	2	4	0	6
CHN	1	2	3	6
NED	1	1	3	5
RUS	0	2	3	5
MEX	0	3	1	4
SWE	0	1	3	4
BRA	0	0	3	3
JPN	1	1	0	2
DEN	0	2	0	2
IRL	0	2	0	2
GER	1	0	0	1
HKG	0	1	0	1
DEN	0	0	1	1
ESP	0	0	1	1
JAP	0	0	1	1
KUW	0	0	1	1
LAT	0	0	1	1
SIN	0	0	1	1

=== World Championships for Racing (2019) ===
Country	Gold	Silver	Bronze	Total
AUS	6	5	3	14
BEL	1	1	2	4
USA	0	1	1	2
GBR	0	0	1	1

=== World Championships for Cable Wakeboard (2001-2008) ===
Country	Gold	Silver	Bronze	Total
GER	21	11	9	41
GBR	5	8	6	19
NED	6	6	1	13
AUS	4	0	7	11
USA	0	5	5	10
HUN	1	3	3	7
FRA	1	1	1	3
ISR	0	1	2	3
SER	0	1	2	3
RUS	1	1	0	2
RSA	1	0	0	1
AUT	0	1	0	1
BUL	0	0	1	1
ICE	0	0	1	1
JAP	0	0	1	1

=== 35+ World Championships for Water Skiing (2010-2018) ===
Country	Gold	Silver	Bronze	Total
USA	16	20	15	51
FRA	5	1	9	15
GBR	3	4	4	11
DEN	3	4	2	9
GEO	3	3	3	9
BEL	3	1	1	5
GER	1	0	4	5
MEX	2	0	2	4
CHI	1	2	0	3
JPN	1	2	0	3
SUI	1	2	0	3
AUT	1	0	1	2
DEN	1	0	1	2
ESP	1	1	0	2
FIN	0	2	0	2
LTU	0	1	1	2
POL	1	0	0	1
SWE	1	0	0	1
RSA	0	1	0	1
COL	0	0	1	1

=== 45+ World Championships for Water Skiing (2010-2018) ===
Country	Gold	Silver	Bronze	Total
USA	23	25	20	68
GBR	8	3	3	14
GER	3	2	6	11
MEX	1	1	3	5
DEN	0	3	1	4
AUT	1	1	1	3
BEL	3	0	0	3
RSA	1	0	1	2
FIN	0	1	1	2
FRA	0	2	0	2
RUS	0	2	0	2
NOR	0	0	2	2
IRL	0	0	1	1
ITA	0	0	1	1

=== 55+ World Championships for Water Skiing (2010-2018) ===
Country	Gold	Silver	Bronze	Total
USA	26	28	18	72
DEN	6	5	8	19
GBR	2	4	2	8
AUT	5	0	0	5
IRL	0	0	3	3
SWE	1	0	1	2
FRA	0	2	0	2
GER	0	1	1	2
AUS	0	0	2	2
MEX	1	0	0	1
DEN	0	0	1	1
RSA	0	0	1	1

=== 65+ World Championships for Water Skiing (2014-2018) ===
Country	Gold	Silver	Bronze	Total
USA	10	17	16	43
GER	9	4	3	16
DEN	5	0	0	5
DEN	0	1	2	3
AUS	0	1	1	2
SWE	0	0	2	2
FRA	0	1	0	1

== See also ==
- List of members of the Water Ski Hall of Fame
- Water skiing
- List of Water Skiing European Champions
