= Wayne Grimditch =

American water skier

Sport
- Country: USA
- Sport: Waterskiing

Wayne Grimditch (b. 1955?) is an American water skier. He competed for the United States in the 1972 Summer Olympics in Germany, winning two silver medals in the water skiing (though as water skiing was a demonstration sport in 1972, they are not included in the medal tables). Grimditch would go on to establish 10 U.S. national jumping records and four world marks in the sport. He earned 16 national titles and was the first skier to earn jumping records in the Junior Boy's, Boy's and Men's divisions simultaneously. Grimditch was known as a child prodigy qualifying for his first national tournament in slalom at just nine years old and winning the world jumping title in Copenhagen, Denmark at age 14. Due to a concussion, he began wearing a helmet which became common to the sport—though not a requirement—thereafter.

Grimditch holds the world record for longest ski jump, breaking his thrice-held previous records by jumping 180 feet in the air in 1975.

Though inducted into the American Water Ski Hall of Fame in 1986 and the International Water Ski Federation Hall of Fame in 2005, one of Grimditch's most well-known legacies was when he competed and won the 1978 ABC's Superstars competition. It was the first and only time that a water skier won the competition. Grimditch went on to place fourth in ABC's World Superstars competition. "Winning the Superstars was one my greatest emotional highs," Grimditch said. The Superstars multi-sport training regimen may have altered Grimditch's water skiing career, however, and injuries associated with participation in Superstars would limit his contributions to the sport on the water in subsequent years. Grimditch moved to television color commentary to give analysis of water skiing events after his skiing career was concluded. Trademarked water skis and helmets bore his name, he provided consulting advice to ski and boat manufacturing companies to provide guidance in the sports' development, and it was said that half of the skiers competing in national competitions in the late 1970s used skis based on his designs. Since leaving the water skiing field, Grimditch began his own fitness company in Florida.
