= Rother Valley Country Park =

Country park in South Yorkshire, England

Coordinates: 53.337°N 1.321°W

Rother Valley Country Park northward view

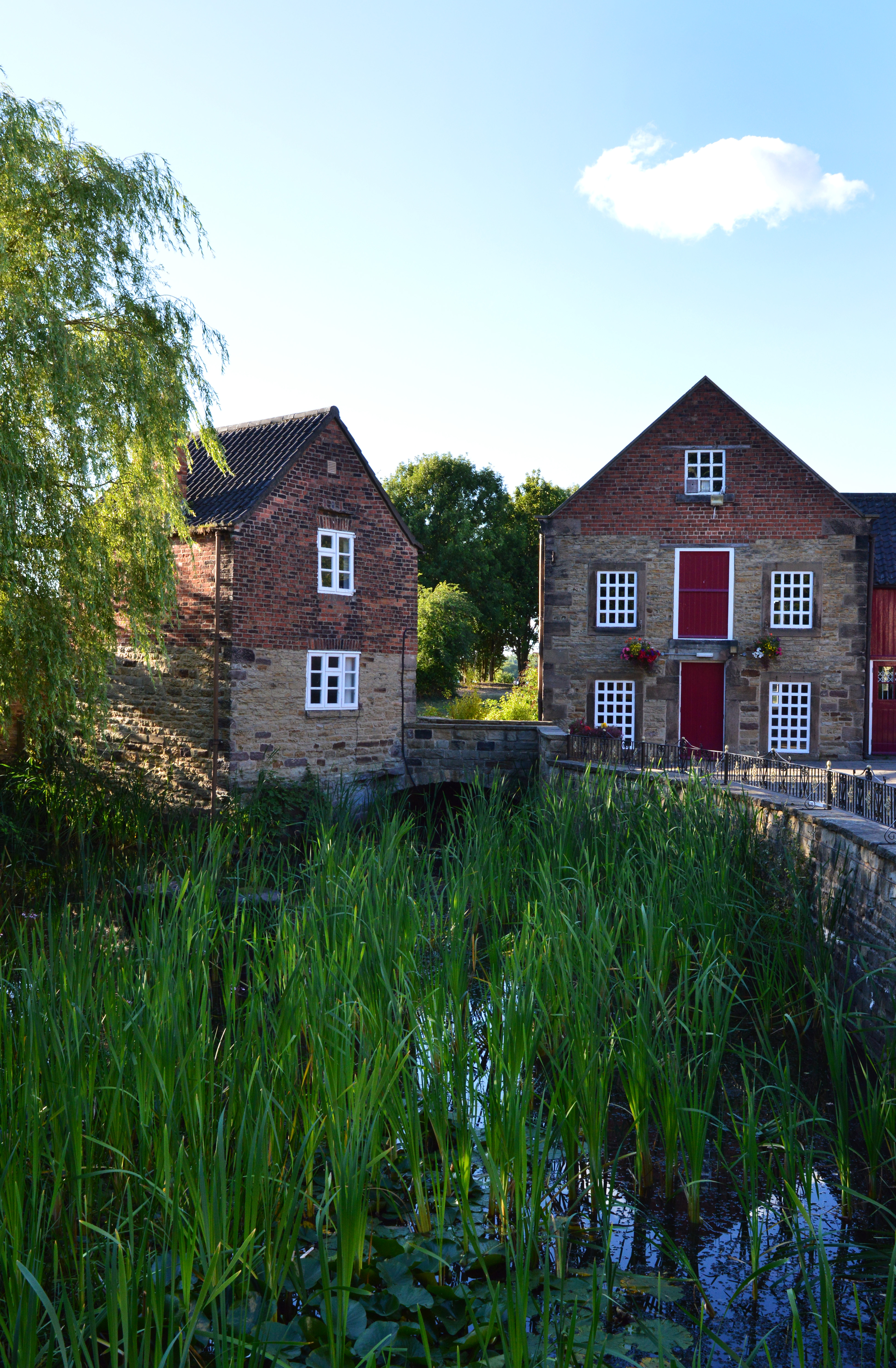
Bedgreave Mill, looking north over the millpond

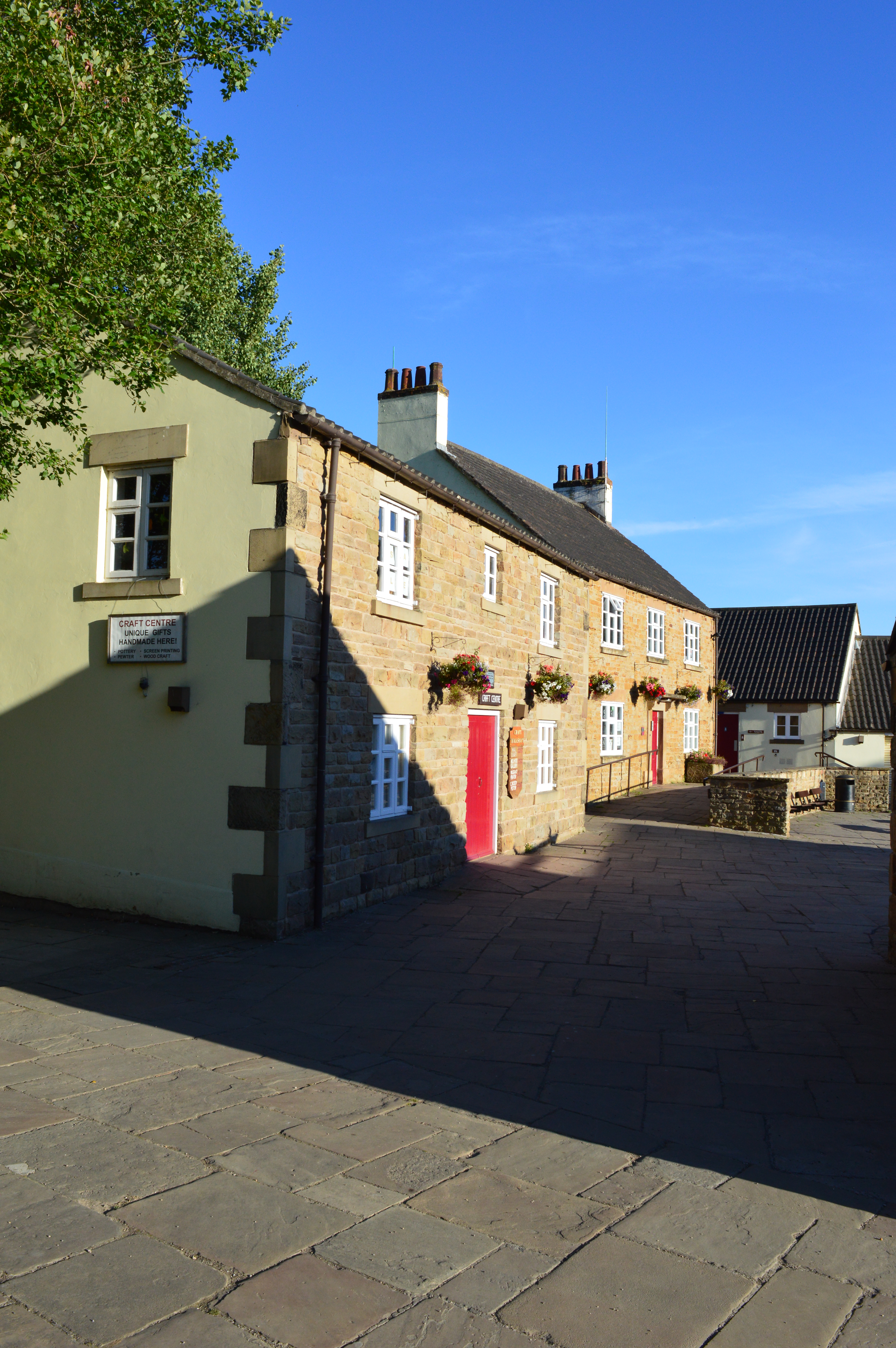
Bedgreave Mill, looking south towards the courtyard

The Rother Valley Country Park is a country park in the Metropolitan Borough of Rotherham, South Yorkshire, England, close to Rotherham's border with Sheffield and Derbyshire. It covers 3 square kilometres (750 acres) and has four artificial lakes, recreational activities and nature reserves. The majority of the park is on land that was open cast for coal, with the main excavation sites filled by the artificial lakes.

== Description ==
The park was officially opened on 27 May 1983, at a cost of £4 million. It aimed to provide an area for recreational pursuits, encourage wildlife to return to the area, and provide a flood protection plan for the areas downstream. When the construction was finished, the lakes were filled with fresh water from The Moss (about 1.6 miles (2.5 km) away) because the River Rother was so heavily polluted at that time.

The park was formerly a mixture of meadows and marshy bullrush beds before the open cast excavation started. At the eastern side of the lake stands the Bedgrave Mill courtyard, where the visitor centre is located displaying the flood defence map and the original mill mechanism "flour into grain" exhibition from when it was a water mill. There is also a craft centre and "The Stables" cafe.

== Cable waterskiing and miniature railway ==
Rother Valley Country Park is home to Sheffield Cable Waterski and Aqua Park. The cable waterski system was installed when the park was originally opened to the public; it was one of the few cable waterski systems in the UK at the time. In recent years an Aqua Park (inflatable obstacle course) was added. The popularity of cable waterskiing has since grown significantly, and there are now a number of these systems in the UK, mainly focused on offering kneeboarding and wakeboarding facilities and what is now called a Wake Park, which is a collection of obstacles (kickers, sliders, etc.) floating in the lake that riders will "hit" on their way round and do tricks from. It is very similar to a snowboard or skateboard park.

There are a licensed waterfront bar and a café at Sheffield Cable Waterski.

An 800-metre (2,600 ft) long 7 1/4 in (184 mm) gauge miniature railway was opened on the east side of the main lake in 2009. The railway owns two locomotives, one diesel hydraulic and the other battery electric. Passengers are carried in carriages which they either sit in, or sit astride.

== Gulliver's Valley ==
In February 2017, planning permission was granted for a new resort to be built alongside Rother Valley called "Gulliver's Valley". It is operated by Gullivers theme parks, which operates Gulliver's Kingdom in Matlock Bath, Gulliver's Land in Milton Keynes and Gullivers World in Warrington. The theme park will be aimed at families, and the resort will also include a water-park and accommodation in the form of glamping. Phase one of the attraction opened in 2020, which includes the main theme park. The site is set to be built in different phases over a ten–to-fifteen year period.
