= List of amusement parks in the United Kingdom =

This is a list of past, present and future amusement parks in the United Kingdom.

== Current ==
=== A–C ===
- Adventure Coast Southport
- Adventure Island
- Alton Towers Resort
- Blackpool Pleasure Beach
- Bottons Pleasure Beach, Skegness
- Chessington World of Adventures
- Codona's
- Crealy Theme Park & Resort
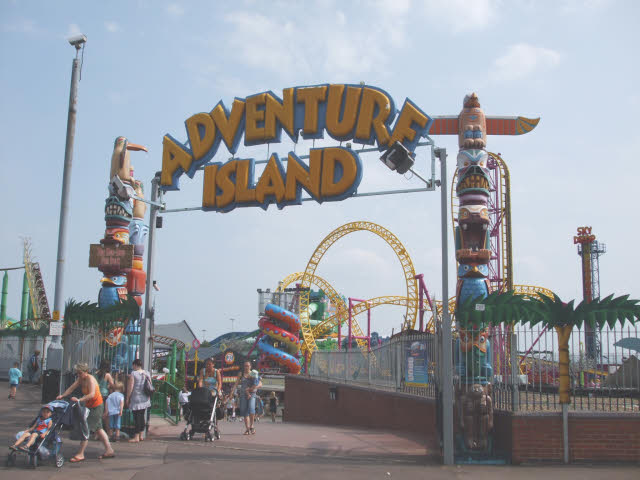
Adventure Island

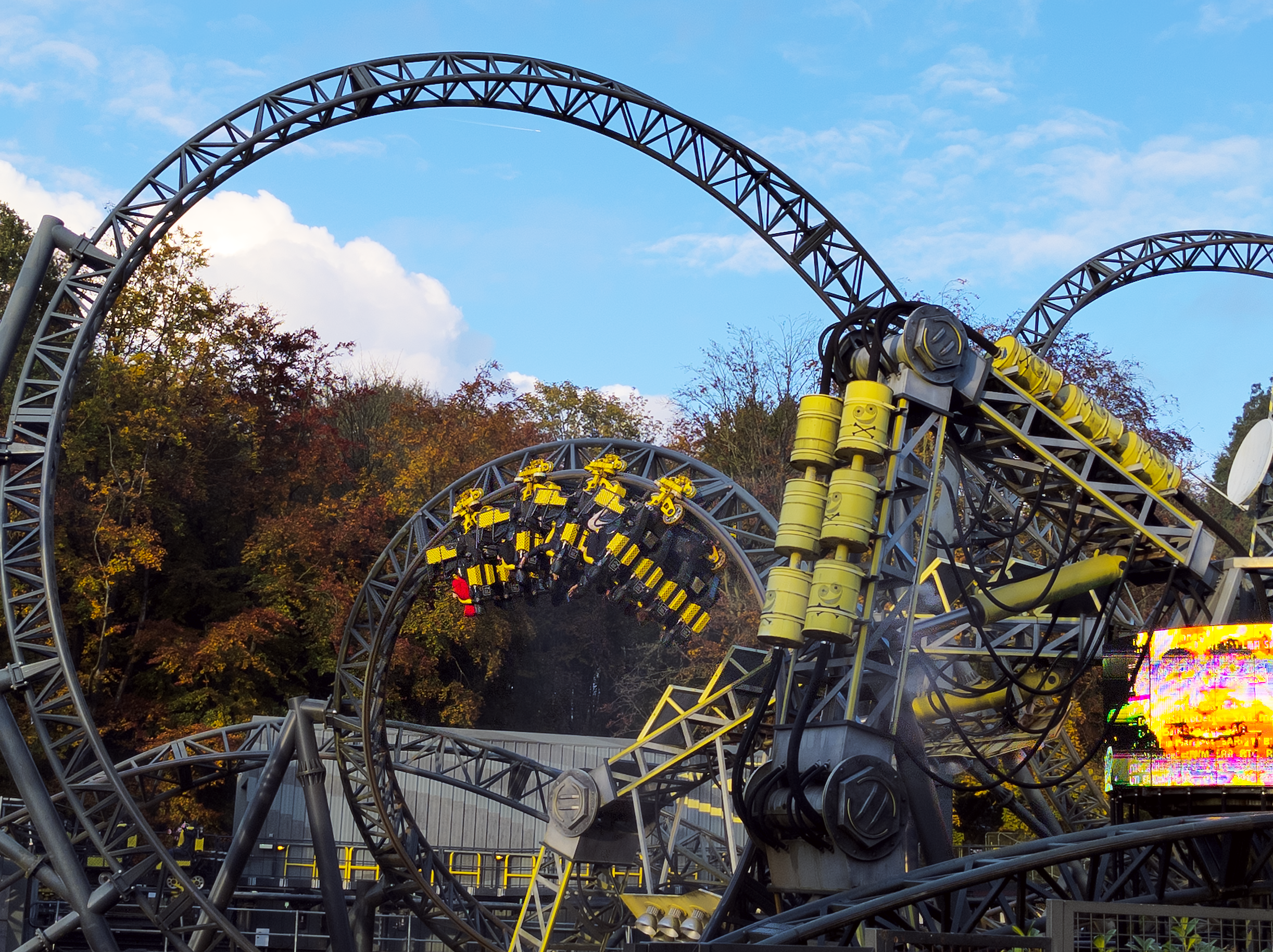
Alton Towers (The Smiler)

=== D–G ===
- Diggerland
  - Devon
  - Durham
  - Kent
  - Yorkshire
- Drayton Manor Theme Park
- Dreamland Margate
- Fantasy Island
- Flamingo Land Resort
- Great Yarmouth Pleasure Beach
- Gulliver's Theme Parks
  - Kingdom
  - Land
  - Valley
  - World

=== H–O ===
- Harbour Park
- Joyland
- Legoland Windsor Resort
- Lightwater Valley
- M&Ds, Scotland's Theme Park

=== P–W ===
- Paultons Park
- Pleasurewood Hills
- Thorpe Park
- Watermouth Castle
- Wicksteed Park
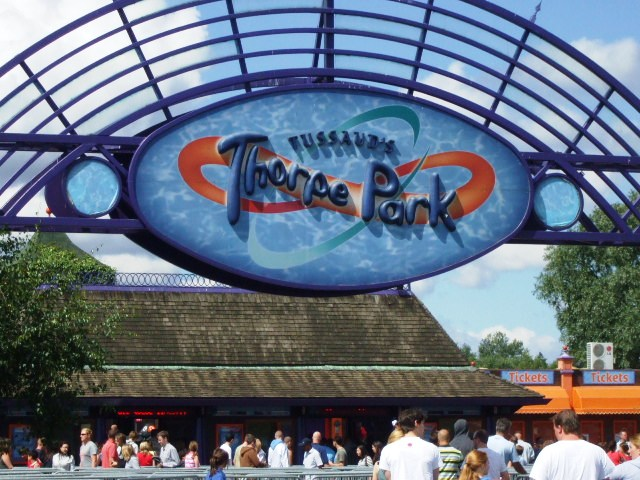
Thorpe Park

== Future ==
- Universal Studios Great Britain, Bedford, United Kingdom (currently in development stage)

== Former ==
- American Adventure
- Camelot Theme Park
- Crinkley Bottom
  - Moorcoombe
  - St Thomas
  - Pleasurewood Hills [Main Park Still Open]
- Flambards Theme Park
- Frontierland
- Granada Studios
- Loudoun Castle
- Marvel's Amusement Park, Scarborough
- Oakwood Theme Park
- Pleasure Island

== See also ==
- Lists of amusement parks
- List of amusement parks in Europe
- List of water parks in Europe
