= 2026 World Wakesurf Championships =

Sports competition held in China

- Host city: Xiaoshan, China
- Dates: 9–17 October 2026

The 2026 World Wakesurf Championships were held in Xiaoshan, China from 9 to 17 October 2026.

== Medal summary ==
=== Surf ===
==== Men ====
Event	Gold		Silver		Bronze	
Open men	Tyler Stewart; United States	76.42	Jeong Su-ho; South Korea	59.50	Lam Wai Kit; Hong Kong	51.92
Under 18 men	Matvei Savichev; IWF	72.50	Sawyer Brandstad; United States	67.08	Cha Gon; South Korea	49.17
Grom boys	Kuo Yu Si; Chinese Taipei	66.33	Andrei Solovev; IWF	59.00	Lin Hao Ze; Chinese Taipei	49.42
Masters men	Kim Sang-Hyun; South Korea	52.33	Michael Steinlesberger; Austria	42.00	Kang Jin-hyeop; South Korea	36.25
Veterans men	Keith Pohl; United States	45.00	Lee Sung-hee; South Korea	38.00	Lin Hao-Ting; Chinese Taipei	34.67

==== Women ====
Event	Gold		Silver		Bronze	
Open women	Brynnlee Hall; United States	69.83	Xia Chenxi; China	63.00	Park Jeon-geun; South Korea	54.33
Under 18 women	Yang Yi Nin; Chinese Taipei	53.33	Jeon Yeol-yeong; South Korea	51.67	Mariia Blanket; IWF	46.92
Grom girls	Beau Walters; United States	56.25	Abygaelle Perren; Switzerland	42.58	Laetitia Pinna; Italy	34.50
Masters women	Lin Szu Hsuan; Chinese Taipei	50.92	Rahel Seger; Switzerland	47.42	Alessandra Zanicotti; Italy	42.08

=== Skim ===
==== Men ====
Event	Gold		Silver		Bronze	
Open men	Jett Lambert; United States	83.75	Tyler Stewart; United States	70.83	Olivier Scokaert; France	66.67
Under 18 men	Matvei Savichev; IWF	81.75	Cole Tucker; United States	75.92	Bang Chan-Yeong; South Korea	70.17
Grom boys	Declyn Van Der Riet; United States	77.92	Andrei Solovev; IWF	70.00	Wong Tze Hin; Hong Kong	59.17
Masters men	Sean Silveira; United States	78.58	Gianmarco Panaccione; Italy	53.42	Matthew Lucini; Italy	40.00
Veterans men	Volodymyr Chuba; Ukraine	64.08	Eric Gamboa Ordonez; Philippines	61.08	Martin Vlcek; Czech Republic	50.00

==== Women ====
Event	Gold		Silver		Bronze	
Open women	Whitley Stewart; United States	75.42	Sofia Sokolova; Ukraine	63.75	Annissa Flynn; Thailand	49.17
Under 18 women	Victoria Moroski; United States	67.50	Gemma Wong; Hong Kong	60.50	Antonyna Mikhnevych; Ukraine	52.92
Grom girls	Abygaelle Perren; Switzerland	69.17	Clair Hurta; United States	63.75	Emma Proudfit; United States	53.75
Masters women	Rahel Seger; Switzerland	54.25	Tatiana Ryzhak; IWF	49.33	Alessandra Zanicotti; Italy	40.00
Veterans women	Amelie Zhang; United Arab Emirates	40.00	Nicole Hudson; United States	34.58	Nina Ryzhenkova; Spain	33.58

=== Overall Team ===
Event	Gold		Silver		Bronze	
Team	United States	980.00	Chinese Taipei	665.00	South Korea	655.00

== Medal table ==
* Host nation (China)

Rank	Nation	Gold	Silver	Bronze	Total
1	United States	10	5	1	16
2	Chinese Taipei	3	1	2	6
3	IWF	2	3	1	6
4	Switzerland	2	2	0	4
5	South Korea	1	3	5	9
6	Ukraine	1	1	1	3
7	United Arab Emirates	1	0	0	1
8	Italy	0	1	4	5
9	Hong Kong	0	1	2	3
10	Austria	0	1	0	1
10	China*	0	1	0	1
10	Philippines	0	1	0	1
13	Czech Republic	0	0	1	1
13	France	0	0	1	1
13	Spain	0	0	1	1
13	Thailand	0	0	1	1
Totals (16 entries)		20	20	20	60
