= NWB =

NWB is an acronym which can stand for:

- National Westminster Bank, a retail banking subsidiary of NatWest Group
- Nederlandse Waterschapsbank, NWB Bank, the Netherlands water boards bank
- Nederlandse Waterski Bond, the Dutch WaterSki Association
- Non Weight Bearing, where the patient may not touch the ground after surgery
- North Wembley station, London, National Rail station code
- Nuclear whipping boy, the designation of the town of Springfield in The Simpsons
