= 2024 World Wakesurf Championships =

- Host city: Hong Kong
- Dates: 2–10 November 2024
- Main venue: Tai Po Waterfront Park

The 2024 World Wakesurf Championships were held in Hong Kong from 2 to 10 November 2024.

== Medal summary ==
=== Surf ===
==== Men ====
Event	Gold		Silver		Bronze	
Open men	Tyler Stewart; United States	78.33	Kenta Nakayama; Japan	60.83	Kelvin Leung; Hong Kong	52.92
Under 18 men	Jett Lambert; United States	70.00	Cheng Ka Wing; Hong Kong	50.83	Yang Yu-Yeh; Chinese Taipei	45.00
Grom boys	Jeong Su Ho; South Korea	72.92	Sawyer Brandstad; United States	65.00	Ren Nishikawa; Japan	51.67
Masters men	Kwok Tak Shing; Hong Kong	75.00	Leung Tsz Chun; Hong Kong	60.00	Matthew Lucini; Italy	53.92
Veterans men	Lin Hao Ting; Chinese Taipei	71.67	Andy Schmahl; Germany	65.00	Yang Chang Feng; Chinese Taipei	61.67

==== Women ====
Event	Gold		Silver		Bronze	
Open women	Dawnee Kanjanapas; Hong Kong	65.00	Lily Anderson; Canada	60.00	Bailey Rush; Canada	55.00
Under 18 women	Runa Abiko; Japan	63.33	Chen Riona; Chinese Taipei	56.67	Antonyna Mykhnevych; Ukraine	51.67
Masters women	Chan Shun Ching; Hong Kong	53.33	Paola Miatello; Italy	45.00	Claudia Blume; Germany	37.33

=== Skim ===
==== Men ====
Event	Gold		Silver		Bronze	
Open men	Tyler Stewart; United States	83.33	Olivier Scokaert; Switzerland	66.25	Songkrod Jomboon; Thailand	62.50
Under 18 men	Jett Lambert; United States	85.00	Ma Chun Hon; Hong Kong	68.33	Patrick Macarthur; Thailand	58.33
Grom boys	Wong Tze Hin; Hong Kong	65.00	Lau Chun Fung; Hong Kong	58.33	Matvei Savichev; IWF	54.00
Masters men	Sean Silveira; United States	82.83	Chan Ho Hin; Hong Kong	80.00	Gianmarco Panaccione; Italy	65.00
Veterans men	Eric Gamboa Ordonez; Philippines	64.33	Volodymyr Chuba; Ukraine	58.33	Michael Steinlesberger; Austria	54.00

==== Women ====
Event	Gold		Silver		Bronze	
Open women	Whitley Stewart; United States	80.00	Bailey Rush; Canada	70.00	Ava Stewart; United States	45.00
Under 18 women	Sofia Sokolova; Ukraine	71.33	Antonyna Mykhnevych; Ukraine	65.83	Morgan Bateman; Canada	58.33
Masters women	Lee Hoi Lun; Hong Kong	51.67	Paola Miatello; Italy	45.42	Li Mengdie; China	40.83
Veterans women	Nicole Hudson; United States	80.00	Jolene Allen; Canada	74.58	Yuka Kagawa; Japan	66.67

=== Overall Team ===
Event	Gold		Silver		Bronze	
Team	United States	780.00	Hong Kong	740.00	Ukraine	510.00

== Medal table ==
* Host nation (Hong Kong)

Rank	Nation	Gold	Silver	Bronze	Total
1	United States	8	1	1	10
2	Hong Kong*	5	6	1	12
3	Ukraine	1	2	2	5
4	Chinese Taipei	1	1	2	4
4	Japan	1	1	2	4
6	Philippines	1	0	0	1
6	South Korea	1	0	0	1
8	Canada	0	3	2	5
9	Italy	0	2	2	4
10	Germany	0	1	1	2
11	Switzerland	0	1	0	1
12	Thailand	0	0	2	2
13	Austria	0	0	1	1
13	China	0	0	1	1
13	IWF	0	0	1	1
Totals (15 entries)		18	18	18	54
