= South African Water Ski Federation =

South African water ski governing body

- Sport: Waterski
- Jurisdiction: South Africa
- Abbreviation: SAWSF
- Affiliation: International Waterski & Wakeboard Federation
- Headquarters: Centurion
- President: Jerome Bauser
- Secretary: Sally Gaze

Official website
- www.sawaterski.co.za
- (South Africa)

South African Water Ski Federation (SAWSF) is the governing body for the sport of waterski in South Africa. It is affiliated to the world governing body International Waterski & Wakeboard Federation, and SASCOC.

SAWSF represents various disciplines such as barefoot, cable wakeboard, classic tournament waterskiing, show skiing, wakeboard, ski racing and disabled waterskiing.

== See also ==
- Sport in South Africa
