= Dutch Waterski Association =

Dutch organization

The Dutch Waterski & Wakeboard Association (Dutch: Nederlandse Waterski & Wakeboard Bond, NWWB) is a union of all Dutch water ski, wakeboard, cable skiing and water sports clubs and organisations. The association's goal is to promote the sport of water skiing and wakeboarding. It organises competition, subsidies, training and scouting, and coordinates sending skiers to international sport events.

The Dutch Waterski & Wakeboard Association is a member organization of the International Waterski & Wakeboard Federation.
