= Australian Waterski and Wakeboard Federation =

Australian sport governing body

- Sport: Waterski, Bare-foot skiing and Wakeboard
- Jurisdiction: Australia
- Abbreviation: AWWF
- Founded: 2007
- Affiliation: International Waterski & Wakeboard Federation
- Affiliation date: 2007
- Headquarters: Melbourne, Victoria

Official website
- www.awwf.com.au
- (Australia)

Australian Waterski and Wakeboard Federation, or AWWF is the governing body for the Waterskiing, Wakeboarding and Bare footing in Australia.

The AWWF has been structured as a sports discipline based organisation that reflects the operation of the sport within all States. The sports disciplines currently comprise the Divisions of Tournament, Barefoot, Disabled, Show Skiing and Wakeboard, Cable Wakeboard (interim). Knee Boarding is represented in some States but not as a separate Division within AWWF. Ski Racing Australia is a separate body but has close ties to the AWWF as we are both affiliated to the International Water Ski Federation.

The Federation services a projected 3500 registered competitive participants and approximately 1.3 million unregistered participants (statistical information obtained from the Sweeney report, state membership and boat registration sources).

The potential to develop the sport is constantly being addressed at both grass roots and high performance levels. Progress to date in the high performance area has placed Australia amongst the very top nations in all disciplines. In the last three years programs to increase entry level participation have been developed and implemented across Australia. The world rankings reflect the effort being undertaken in junior and senior developments.

The strength of the sport internationally is also on the rise. Australian competitors have taken part in water ski racing at the World Games since 1981 and at the Pan American Games since 1995. The sport features a range of events, including the Moomba Masters, the World Games, and the World Cup. The federation also maintains links to events such as the Bridge to Bridge race and the Australian Ski racing Grand Prix through its relationship with the Water Ski Racing Australia. Cable wakeboard was at one point considered for inclusion in the 2020 Olympic Games.

With the exception of the Executive Officer and the Office Administrative Assistant in the National Office, all Directors, Administrators, Judges and Organisers are volunteers. The AWWF arranges Public Liability Insurance for affiliated water ski clubs, sanctioned sites, competitions and training. Membership also entitles members to Personal Accident Insurance for water ski related injuries and to travel insurance on international travel for water skiing events and training. We negotiate water safety, access and policy matters with maritime authorities on behalf of both AWWF members and recreational skiers.

The AWWF continues to provide an umbrella administration that encompasses Junior, Senior, Masters, Female, Male, Indigenous and Disabled in all disciplines of the Sport.

== AWWF Constitution ==
The constitution of the AWWF can be viewed here.

== AWWF Structure ==
The Structure comprises up to 9 Directors, one from each active Division (currently 5), a Finance Director and a State Director. Each State can apply to be affiliated as Member State which gives them voting rights at AWWF General Meetings. Currently all States are Members. Within each Division, there are State Based Divisional Committees.

== AWWF Policies ==
- Member Protection
- Divisional Selection Policies
- Anti-Doping Policy
  - World Anti-Doping Code, International Standard
  - AWWF Anti-Doping Policy
  - Anti-Doping Awareness
  - National Squad Team
- AWWF Rules and Regulations
- IWWF Rules and Regulations
