= World Wakesurf Championships =

Biennial sports competition

- Genre: Worldwide
- Frequency: Biennial
- Inaugurated: 2024
- Organiser: International Waterski & Wakeboard Federation (IWWF)

The World Wakesurf Championships is a biennial Wakesurfing competition that has taken place by International Waterski & Wakeboard Federation. The inaugural edition was held in 2024. The current edition held in 2026.

== Edition ==
Year	Host	Date	Top nation
2024	Hong Kong	November 2–10	United States
2026	(China) Xiaoshan	October 9–17	United States

== All time medal table ==
Rank	Nation	Gold	Silver	Bronze	Total
1	United States	18	6	2	26
2	Hong Kong	5	7	3	15
3	Chinese Taipei	4	2	4	10
4	South Korea	2	3	5	10
5	Ukraine	2	3	3	8
6	IWF	2	3	2	7
7	Switzerland	2	3	0	5
8	Japan	1	1	2	4
9	Philippines	1	1	0	2
10	United Arab Emirates	1	0	0	1
11	Italy	0	3	6	9
12	Canada	0	3	2	5
13	Austria	0	1	1	2
13	China	0	1	1	2
13	Germany	0	1	1	2
16	Thailand	0	0	3	3
17	Czech Republic	0	0	1	1
17	France	0	0	1	1
17	Spain	0	0	1	1
Totals (19 entries)		38	38	38	114
