= Kim Sang-hyun =

- Hangul: 김상현
- RR: Gim Sanghyeon
- MR: Kim Sanghyŏn

Kim Sang-hyun (Korean: 김상현) is a Korean name consisting of the family name Kim and the given name Sang-hyun, and may also refer to:

- Kim Sang-hyun (boxer) (born 1955), South Korean boxer
- Kim Sang-hyun (baseball) (born 1980), South Korean baseball player
