= Sang-hyun =

- Hangul: 상현
- RR: Sanghyeon
- MR: Sanghyŏn

Sang-hyun is a Korean given name.

Notable people with this name include:

Entertainers

- Um Sang-hyun (born 1971), South Korean voice actor
- Yoon Sang-hyun (born 1973), South Korean actor
- Thunder (singer) (born Park Sang-hyun, 1990), South Korean singer

Government and politics

- Song Sang-hyun (1551–1595), Joseon Dynasty civil minister and general
- Song Sang-hyun (born 1941), South Korean lawyer
- Sam Yoon (born Yoon Sang-hyun, 1970), South Korean-born American politician

Sportspeople

- Kim Sang-hyun (boxer) (born 1955), South Korean boxer
- Chung Sang-hyun (born 1963), South Korean field hockey player
- Cho Sang-hyun (born 1976), South Korean basketball player
- Kim Sang-hyeon (baseball) (born 1980), South Korean baseball player
- Park Sang-hyeon (born 1983), South Korean sledge hockey player
- Park Sang-hyun (golfer) (born 1983), South Korean professional golfer
- An Sang-hyun (born 1986), South Korean football player

Others

- Sang Hyun Lee (born 1938), South Korean-born American theologian
- Lee Sang-hyun (born 1955), South Korean sculptor

== See also ==
- List of Korean given names
