= Gulliver's Valley =

Theme park in Rotherham, England

Coordinates: 53.348°N 1.302°W

Gulliver's Valley Resort
- Interactive map of Gulliver's Valley Resort
- Location: Gulliver's Valley Resort, Rotherham, South Yorkshire, England
- Status: Operating
- Opened: 11 July 2020; 6 years ago
- Operated by: Gulliver's Theme Parks
- General manager: Craig Seedhouse
- Theme: Dinosaurs, Wild west, fantasy, pirates, motorsport, toys
- Slogan: Giant adventures are about to begin!
- Operating season: February - December
- Area: 250 acres (100 ha)

Attractions
- Total: 30 (as of 2022)
- Website: Official website

Gulliver's Valley is a theme park and resort located in Rotherham, England. Construction began in 2018 at a planned cost of £37 million. The first phase, costing £7.5 million, was due to open in spring 2020 but the opening was delayed due to the coronavirus pandemic. The park officially opened on 11 July 2020.

Gulliver's Valley has sister parks at Warrington (Gulliver's World), Matlock Bath (Gulliver's Kingdom) and Milton Keynes (Gulliver's Land).

== Attractions ==
The park is aimed at families with children aged 2 to 13.

Gully Town
- Melody Mayhem (ride)
- Children's Carousel (ride)
- Tree Top Drop (ride)
- Crazy Golf (attraction)

Dragons Lair

- Dragons Peak (climbing walls)
- Dragons Nest Quest (bouncy castle)
- Crimson Caves (attraction)

Lost World

- T-Rex Tower (water slide)
- Paragliders (swing ride)
- Lost World River Tour (boat ride)
- Jurassic Jeeps (ride)
- Gyrosaur (ride)

Toyland

- Toyland Ferris Wheel (ride)
- Lilliput Carousel (ride)
- Rockin' Tug (ride)
- Frantic Fire Trucks (ride)
- The Wriggler (rollercoaster)
- Jumbo Jetters (ride)
- Build Zone Diggers (attraction)

Smugglers Wharf

- Blackbeard's Barrels (ride)
- Crocodile Creek (ride)
- Ghostly Galleon (ride)

Western World

- Apache Falls (water ride)
- Sioux City Express (ride)
- Prairie Ponies (ride)
- Rocky Ridge Railway (ride)
- Tombstone Mine (ride)

Gully's Gears

- Grand Prix Racers (rollercoaster)
- Carfari (ride)
- Dodge City Dodgems (ride)
- Turbo Tower (ride)
- Crazy Planes (ride)
