= Cable skiing =

Cable waterski
- Cable skiing in Vienna
- Highest governing body: International Waterski & Wakeboard Federation
- First played: Finland, 1950s

Characteristics
- Contact: No
- Mixed-sex: No
- Type: Aquatic sport
- Equipment: Water skis, cable tow installation
- Venue: Body of water

Presence
- Olympic: No
- World Games: 2005

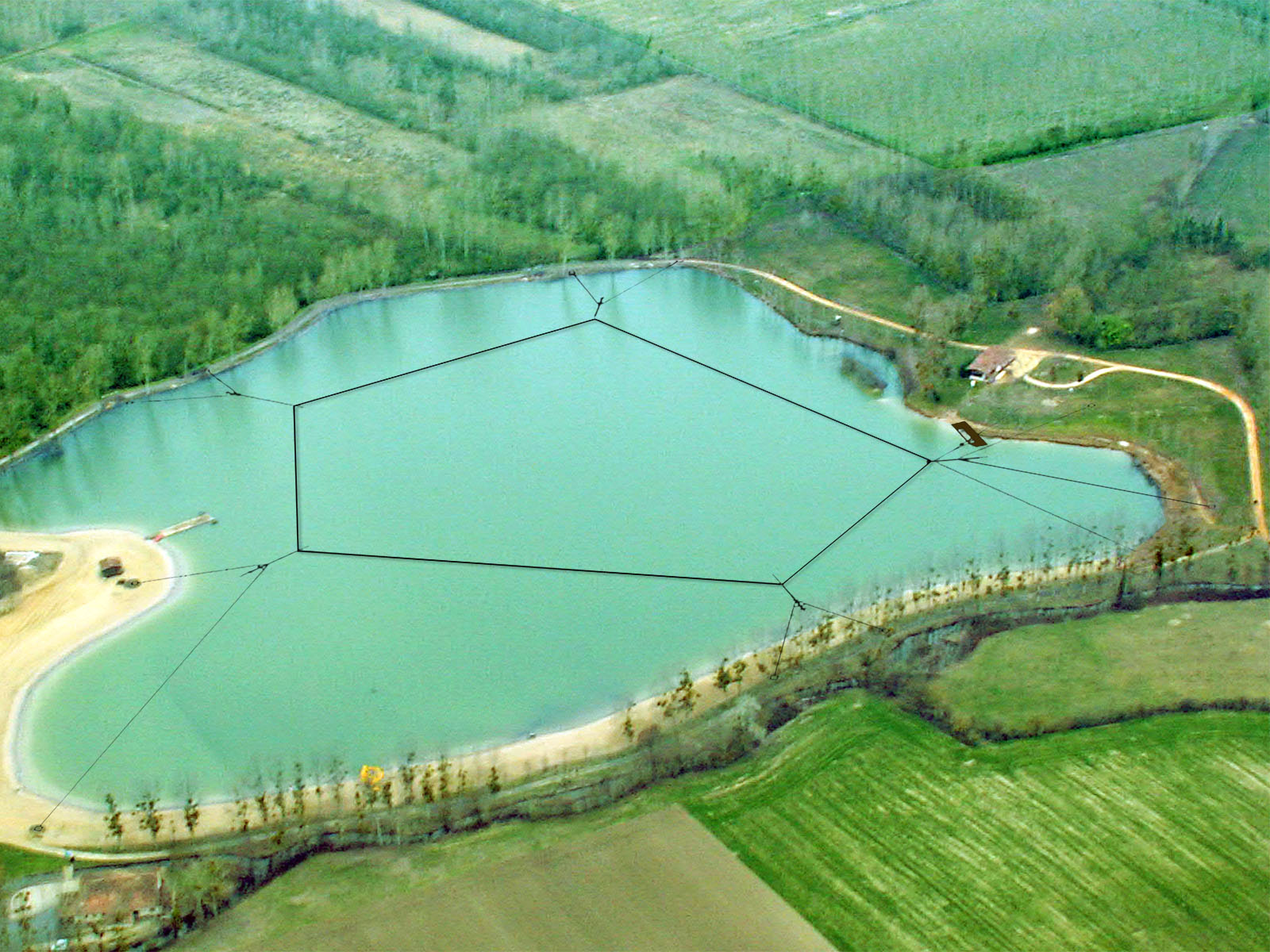
Concept drawings for a cable ski course in France

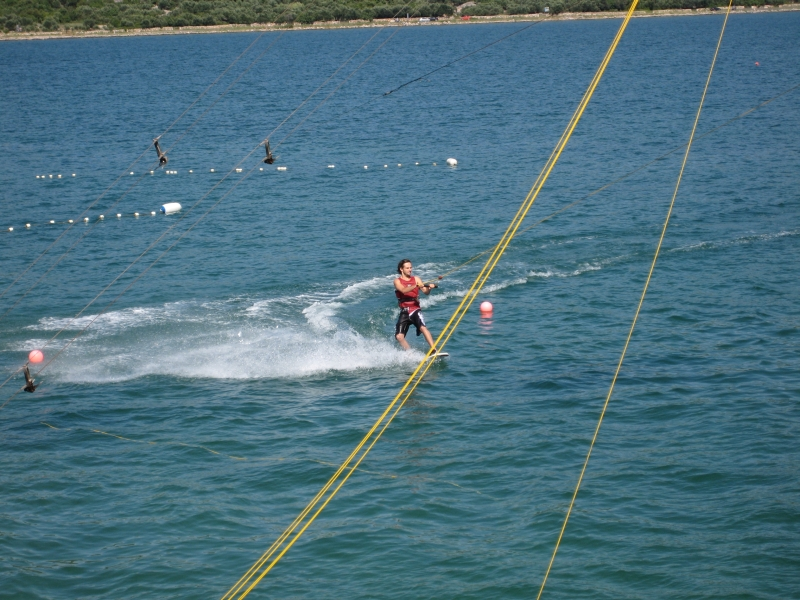
Cable ski – Wakeboarding on the island Krk between towns Punat and Krk, Croatia.

Cable skiing is a way to water ski (or wakeboard), in which the skier's rope and handle are pulled by an electrically driven cable, whereas traditionally a waterskier is pulled by a motorboat. The mechanism consists of two cables running parallel to one another with carriers between them every 80 metres. The carriers are metal tubes that can hook up tow ropes with riders. Tow ropes are detached and attached at the same time without slowing the system down, which is a main reason for its high efficiency. With a main cable of 800 metres long, 10 riders can waterski or wakeboard at the same time. The speed of the main cable can be up to 38 mph (61 km/h), and slalom skiers can reach much higher speeds. The most common speed is 19 mph (31 km/h), which suits wakeboarders best.

The cable is generally suspended 26–30 feet (7.9–9.1 metres) above the water. This makes for a different feel than when riding behind a boat, whether wakeboarding or water skiing.

The higher angle of pull makes bigger "air" and sharper turns possible. Generally, on wakeboard-only cables, there are ramps and sliders for the riders to use. Another way for wakeboarders to get air on the cable is to "load the line." Loading the line is putting tension on the rope and using the water as a spring to fling oneself into the air. Though it is possible to do this behind a boat, the higher angle of pull and the slight jerk on the corners allow good riders to get much higher.

Other important advantages of the cable compared to the boat are environmental friendliness and the enormous capacity. The electric motor of the cable is quiet, clean and energy-efficient. A cableway with a main cable 800 metres long operated at 19 mph (31 km/h) makes 38.8 rounds in one hour (456 miles per day if used round the clock) and the users get 19 miles (31 km) of water skiing or wake boarding in that hour.

== History ==
The modern cable skiing system was invented by a German engineer Bruno Rixen, who built his first water ski cableway on a lake in Bordesholm, Germany, in 1959. Rixen sold the first commercial system in 1966. However at least one prior cable skiing facility was in operation in Helsinki during the 1950s, and it was claimed to be the first in the world. The inventor was Kauko Kolma, a Finnish construction foreman and water skier.

== Popularity ==
Cable skiing is very popular in Europe and slowly gaining momentum in the United States. In Germany alone, there are over 70 active cableways plus 15 two mast cableways. Two mast cable systems also called linear cable systems are gaining popularity world-wide with numerous systems across the US and Europe with prices for systems ranging from US$8,000 to US$35,000. One spot in Germany, Langenfeld, has four cableway systems and the highest water skiing and wakeboarding capacity in the world. Since the sport has been growing very fast recently, there are currently more than 40 cables in Poland - Margonin (960 m), Szczecinek (1100 m), Ostróda (800 m), Lublin (760 m) and Augustów (740 m). In the U.S. there are around 50 cableways.
