= Gulliver's Kingdom =

Theme park in Derbyshire, England

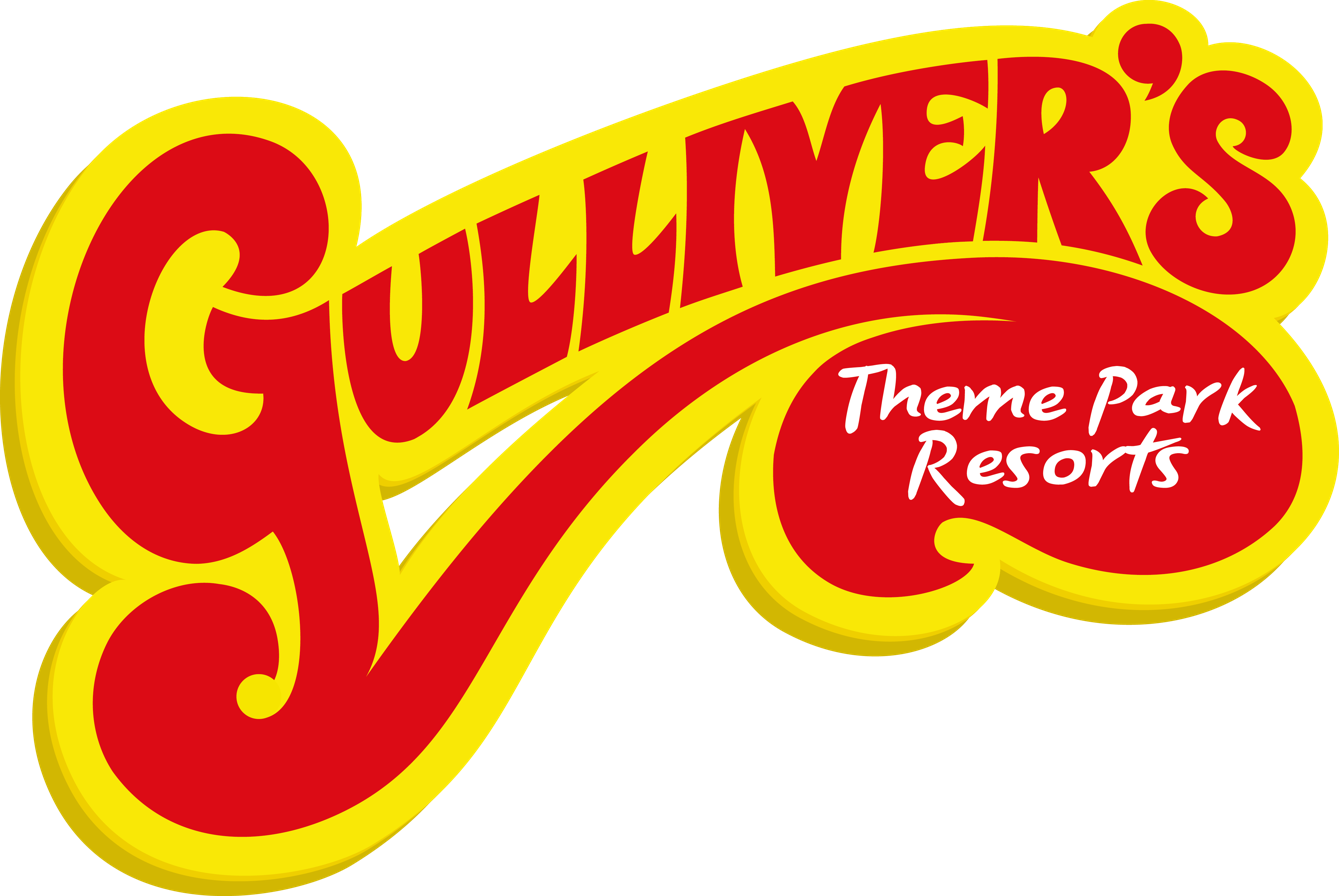
- Gulliver's Kingdom
- Interactive map of Gulliver's Kingdom
- Location: Matlock Bath, Derbyshire, England
- Coordinates: 53.118197°N 1.564395°W
- Status: Operating
- Opened: 27 May 1978; 48 years ago
- Owner: Phillips family
- Slogan: Giant Adventures for Families
- Operating season: March-November
- Website: https://www.gulliverskingdomresort.co.uk

Gulliver's Kingdom (also known as Gulliver's Matlock Bath) is a theme park aimed at children aged 3-13 in the Derbyshire village of Matlock Bath, England. The park was founded in 1978 by Ray and Hilary Phillips as a model village, before later expanding to include a small train and some second hand rides. The Philips Family still own Gulliver's Kingdom in the present day.

== History ==
The park was opened on 27th May 1978 by Ray and Hilary Phillips as a model village, before later expanding to include a small train and some second hand rides.

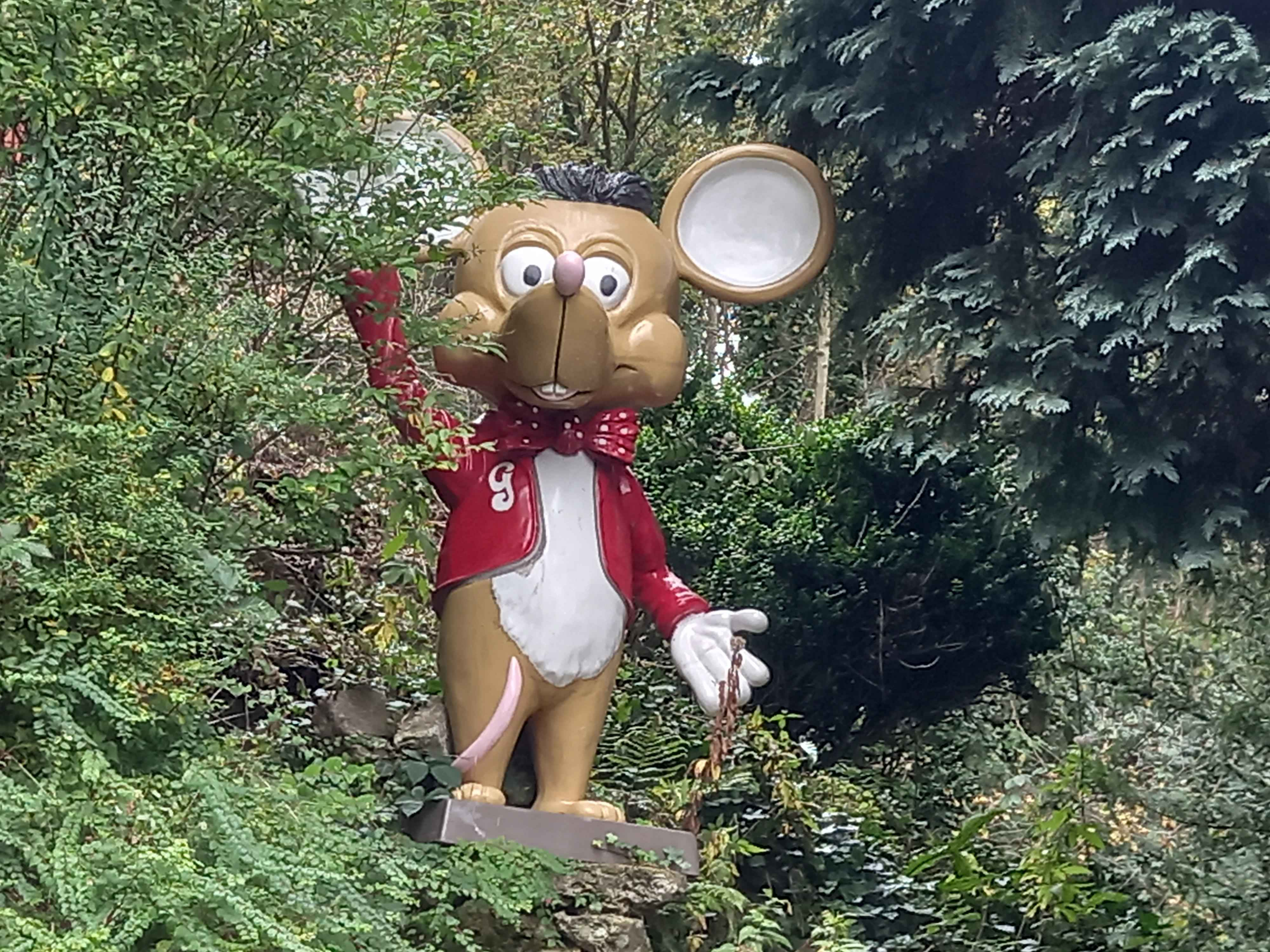
A statue of Gully Mouse, Gulliver's mascot

Gulliver's Kingdom is close to the site of the Victorian Switchback rollercoaster ride, after which the theme park's main rollercoaster was eventually named.

In the early 1980s, a hotel and a number of chalets were constructed within the park. These facilities were shut in the late 1990s. In 2017, the concept was revisited with the development of a themed accommodation titled 'Explorers Retreat'.

Gulliver’s Kingdom celebrated its 45th anniversary in 2023.

== Rides and attractions ==
=== Water rides ===
| Name | Area | Description |
|---|---|---|
| Log Flume | Western World | A log flume ride |
| Buddy’s Pirate Adventure | Smugglers Wharf | Small boat ride through an interactive pirate experience |
| Dino Falls | Lost World | Dinghy-based, double water slide |

=== Roller Coasters ===
| Name | Area | Description |
|---|---|---|
| Log Roller Coaster | Lilliput Land | A log themed roller coaster |

=== Tracked rides ===
| Name | Area | Description |
|---|---|---|
| Cycle Monorail | Fairy Kingdom | Self pedalled monorail |
| Silver Mine Ride | Western World | Interactive track ride |
| Dino Explorer Cars | Lost World | Dinosaur themed track cars |

=== Flat/other rides ===
| Name | Area | Description |
|---|---|---|
| Jumping Stars | Explorer’s Play House | A small tower drop ride |
| Fish Ride | Explorer’s Play House | Child-friendly, fish themed ride |
| Chairlift | Safari Kingdom | Chairlift to lower and higher levels of the park |
| Ladybird Ride | Explorer’s Play House | Child-friendly, ladybird themed ride |
| Drop Tower | Safari Kingdom | Tower drop ride |
| Flying Bikes | Safari Kingdom | Aerial bicycle themed ride |
| Crazy Barrel Ride | Lilliput Land | Waltzer-style ride |
| Crows Nest Quest | Smugglers Wharf | A high ropes climbable frame |
| Double Decker Carousel | Smugglers Wharf | Carousel ride |
| Pirate Ship | Smugglers Wharf | Swinging pirate ship |
| Riggers Revenge | Smugglers Wharf | Zip line aerial course |
| Safari Dodgems | Safari Kingdom | Dodgems |
| JCB Zone | Lilliput Land | Child operated, small JCB diggers |

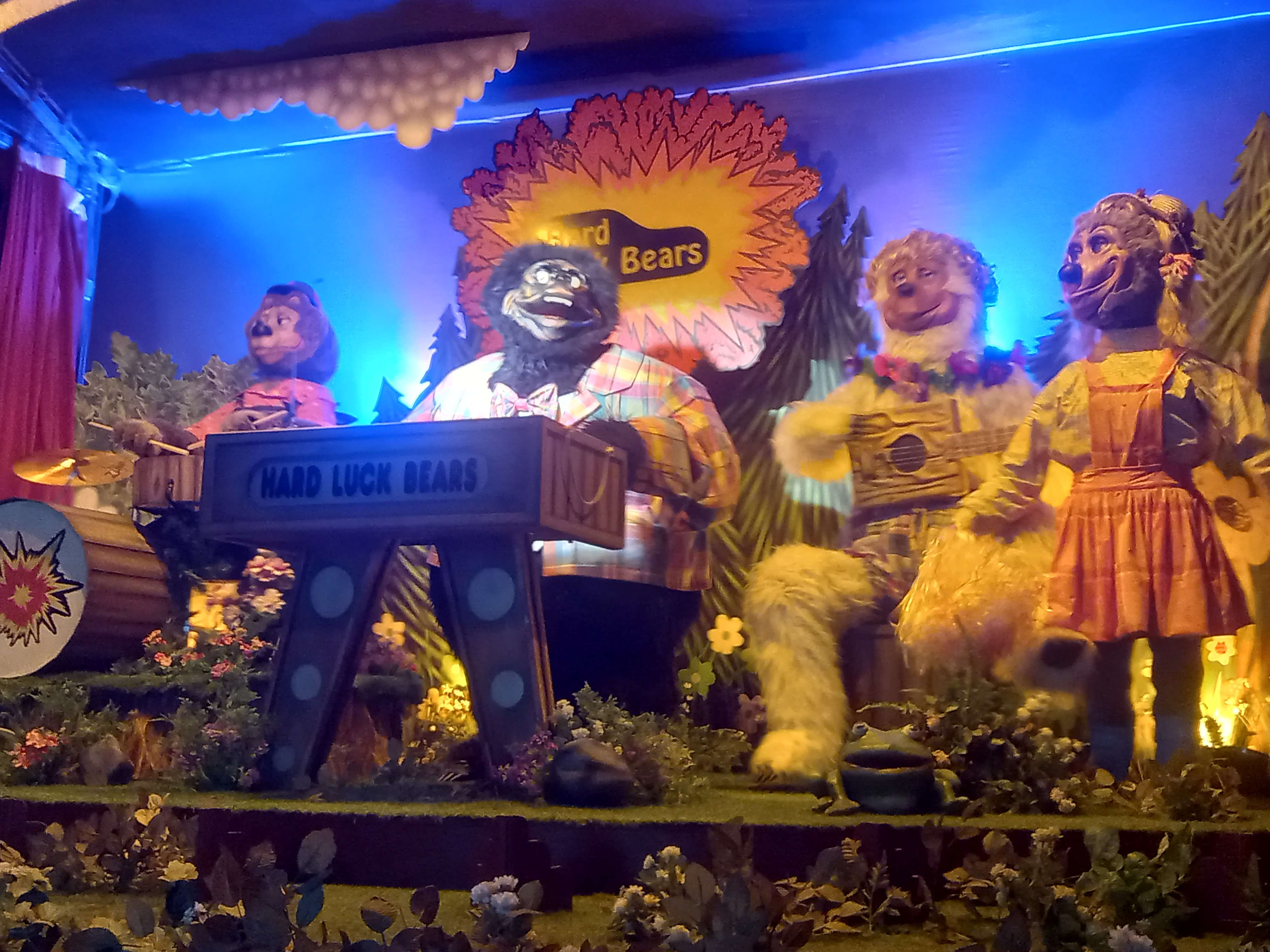
The Rock-afire Explosion (under The Hard Luck Bears) performing at Gulliver's Kingdom in Matlock Bath, Derbyshire

=== Entertainment ===
| Name | Area | Description |
|---|---|---|
| The Hard Luck Bear Show | Western World | An indoor animatronic show retrofitted from The Rock-afire Explosion |
| The Western Bears | Western World | An outdoor animatronic show with the singing, western bears |

== See also ==
- Gulliver's Land
- Gulliver's World
- Gulliver's Valley
