= Gulliver's Land =

Theme park in Milton Keynes, England

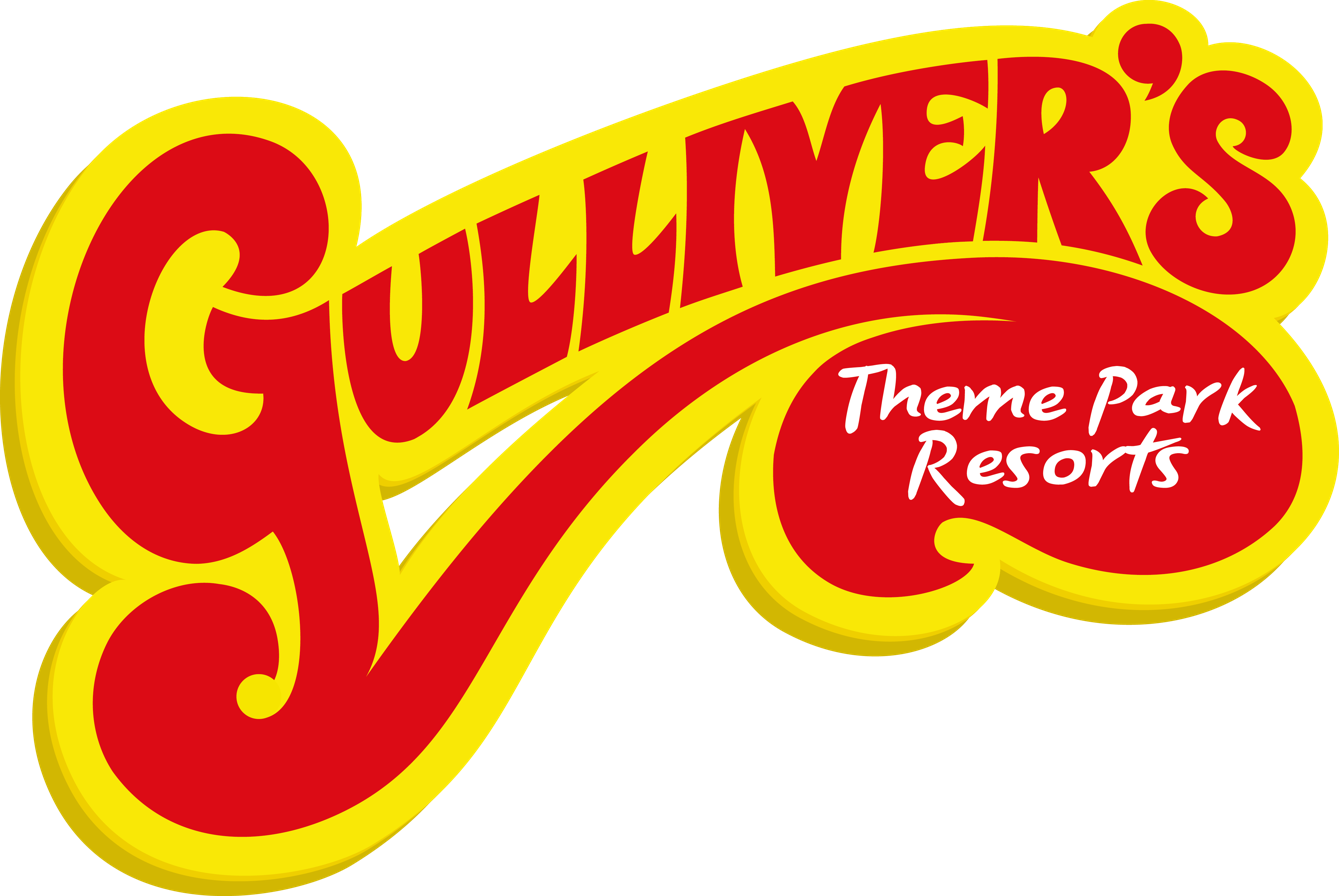
- Interactive map of Gulliver's Land
- Location: Gulliver's Land Resort, Milton Keynes, Buckinghamshire, England
- Coordinates: 52°03′04″N 0°43′49″W
- Opened: March 1999; 27 years ago
- Slogan: Giant Adventures for Families
- Operating season: February–December
- Website: www.gulliverslandresort.co.uk

Gulliver's Land is a children's theme park resort in Milton Keynes, England. It is the third Gulliver's park, constructed after Gulliver's Kingdom and Gulliver's World but before Gulliver's Valley. It is designed with rides and shows specifically aimed at children aged 2 to 13.

The park was announced in October 1997 and opened on March 31st 1999. The land for the park was purchased from the Commission for New Towns. The resort currently includes the Gulliver's Land Theme Park, Gulliver's Dinosaur and Farm Park, Adventurers Village, and Gulliver's Meadow Camp Site. Former attractions Gulliver's Splash Zone, The SFEAR, and Gulliver's Blast Arena failed to re-open after the COVID-19 pandemic and remain on the site standing but not operating.

The resort operates a number of annual events for Easter, Halloween and Christmas. The "Land of Lights" Christmas light trail has run from the Dinosaur and Farm Park site since 2022.

Gulliver's Land is typically open from February until December.

== History ==
After the success of their second theme park in Warrington, the family behind Gulliver's were looking for their next location. Milton Keynes brought the chain within reach of London, and also had the same planning benefits as Warrington, both being part of the new towns scheme. Plans for the new park were initially lodged with the Commission for New Towns in January of 1997.

The Park was officially announced in October 1997, by which point construction work had already begun.

The 31st of March 1999 saw the parks grand opening with over 30 attractions. It opened with the four lands of Lilliput Land, Adventure Land, Discovery Bay, and Toy Land.

The 2003 season featured the opening of the parks largest roller coaster "Python".

The Christmas offering at the park was expanded in December 2003 with the opening of the new Christmas grotto for a cost of £250,000 (equivalent to £457,000 in 2025) that was promoted as the largest in the UK. By the start of the 2004 season this had been re-branded to the "Enchanted Forest" and opened alongside the new rides "Free Fall" and "The Rocking Tug Boat". In June 2004 plans were submitted to Milton Keynes Council for the construction of an "eco-theme park" adjacent to the current park.

The new Eco-Park was officially announced in April 2005. Construction of the park took just over 2 years and it opened in May 2007 as "Gulliver's Eco Park".

In 2009 the park would see the opening of a new indoor play attraction "Gully Town". Additionally, Gulliver's Eco Park would be split in three with the western side becoming "Gulliver's Dinosaur and Farm Park", the eastern side remaining as the Eco Park, and the northern area of the park beginning redevelopment into a camp site known as "Gully's camp". The camp site would open in 2010 as a Camping and Caravanning Club location.

Adventure land got another expansion in 2015 with the construction of the "Jungle Falls" giant waterslides.

== Gulliver's Land Resort ==
The theme park has expanded over the years and now includes a selection of accommodation at the nearby Adventurers Village Resort. Accommodation types include cabins, lodges, dens and glamping tents. Accessible accommodation is now available, with the resort offering accessible lodges and tents. Short break packages include entry to the main theme park, splash zone and dinosaur and farm park.

=== Adventurers Village accommodation types ===
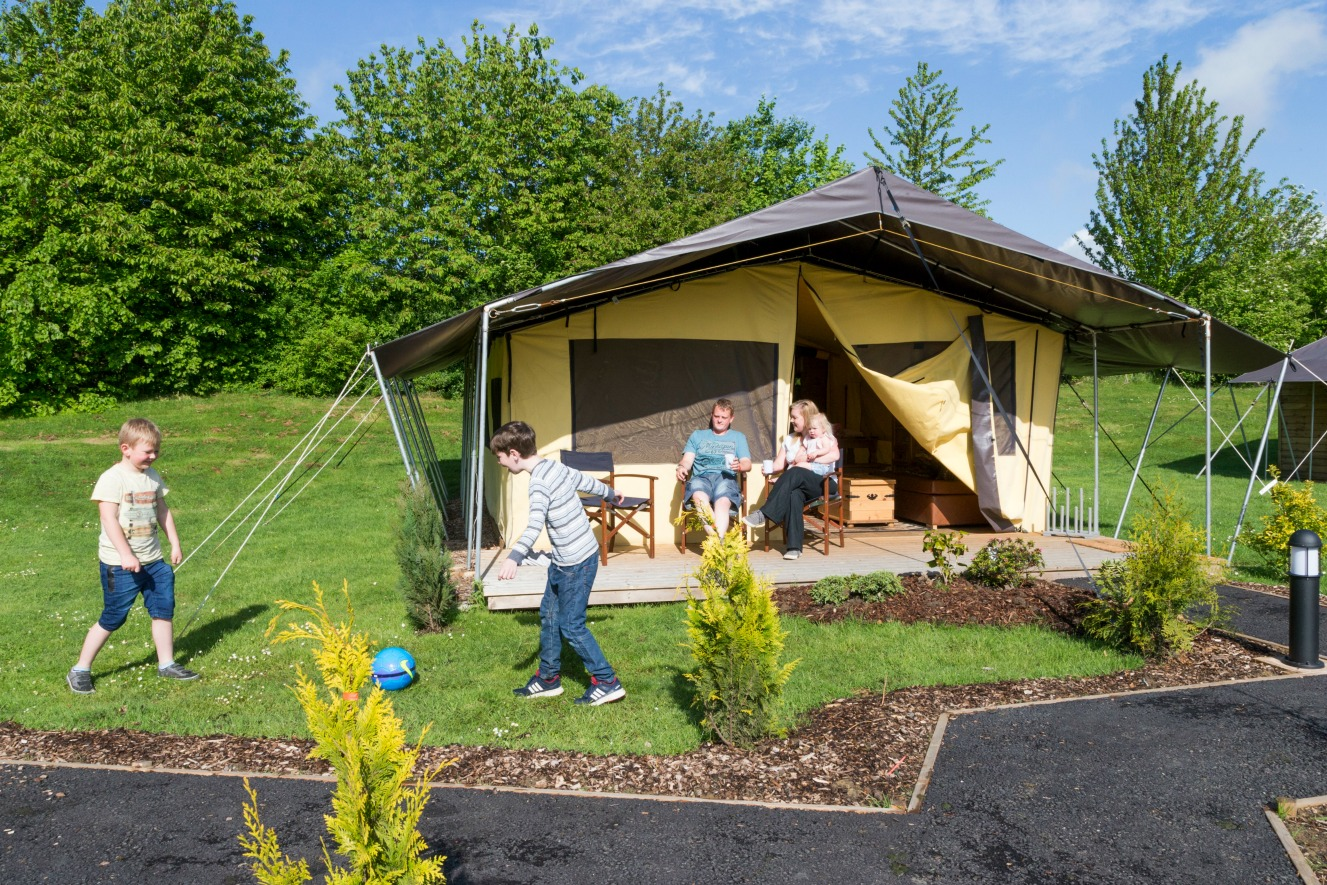
Jungle Safari Tents

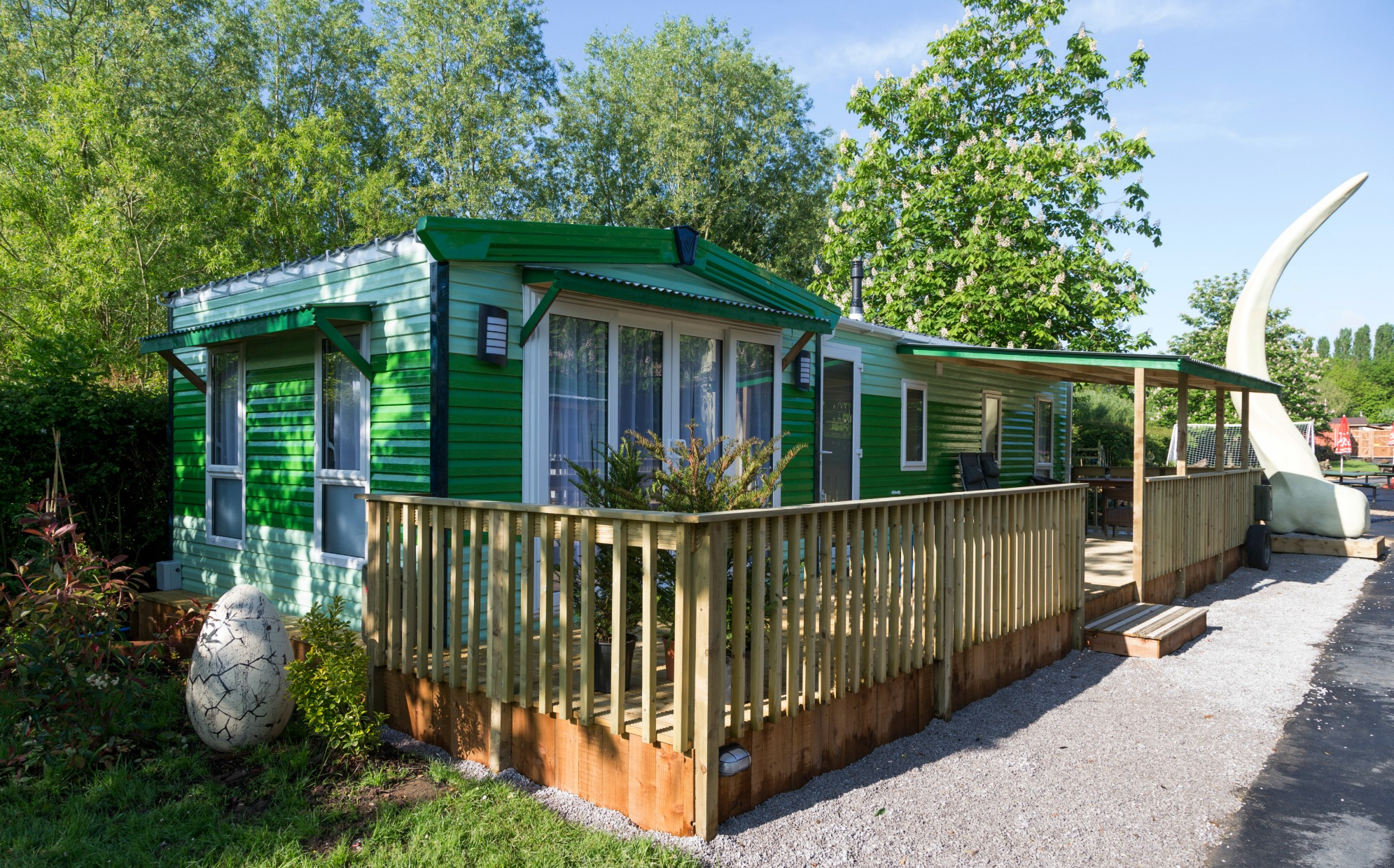
Lost World Cabin

- Lost World Cabins
- Dino Dens
- Safari Glamping Tents
- Wild West Lodges
- Beach Dens
- Deluxe Dino Dens
- JCB Dens (From 2017)

== Dinosaur and Farm Park ==
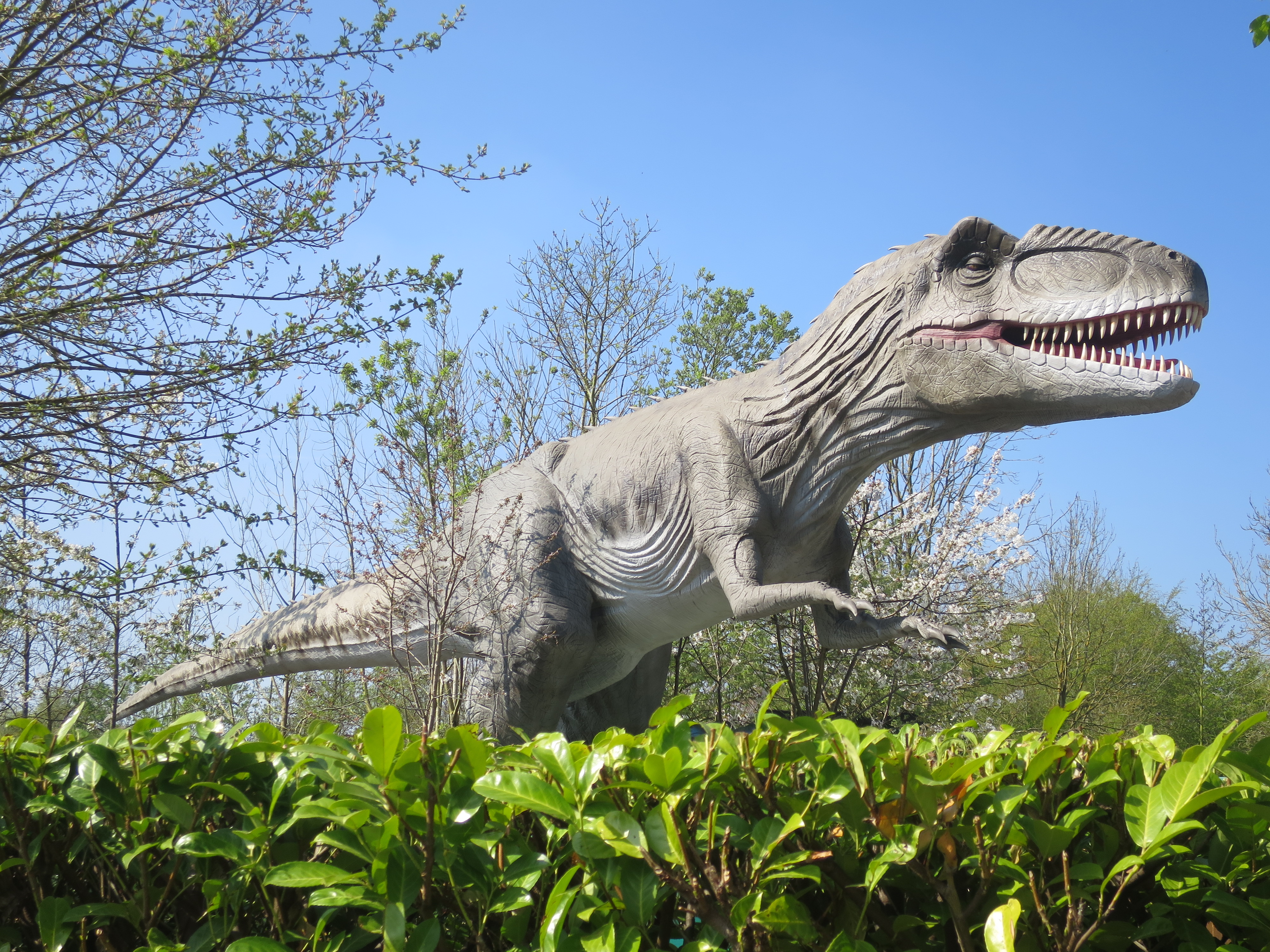
A Giganotosaurus model

Dinosaur and Farm Park is located next to the main theme park. This is a standalone attraction and notable for its collection of animatronic dinosaurs of various sizes. Voted one of the best dinosaur attractions in the UK, Dinosaur and Farm Park is split into two sections. The Farm Park area has farmyard animals alongside interactive farmyard attractions.

== Blast Arena ==
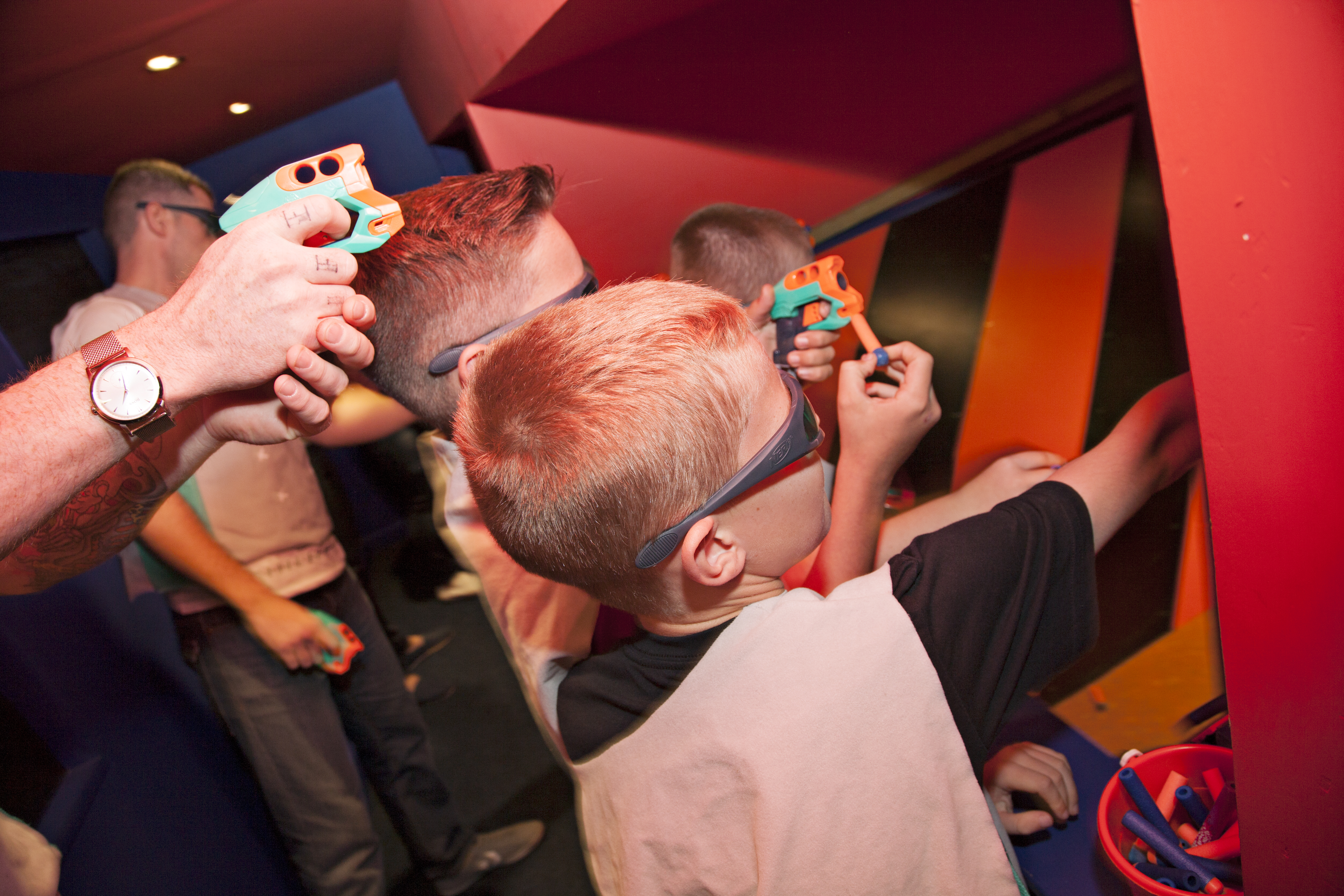
Nerf Zone

Blast Arena at Gulliver's Land is one of three official Blast Arenas operated by Gulliver's. The other two are located at Warrington, Cheshire and Matlock Bath, Derbyshire. Blast Arena goggles, vest and blaster are provided to each participant. Blast Arena is suitable for children aged 6 and over. The attraction is completely indoors, with the option of a birthday party package.

The Blast Arena centre is located within Dinosaur and Farm Park, close to Splash Zone and The SFEAR.

== Splash Zone ==
One of the first standalone attractions at Gulliver's Land, Splash Zone is a water playground situated indoors. There is no standing water; the splash area consists of water play elements such as cannons, sprays and a giant tipping bucket.

=== Additional watersides ===
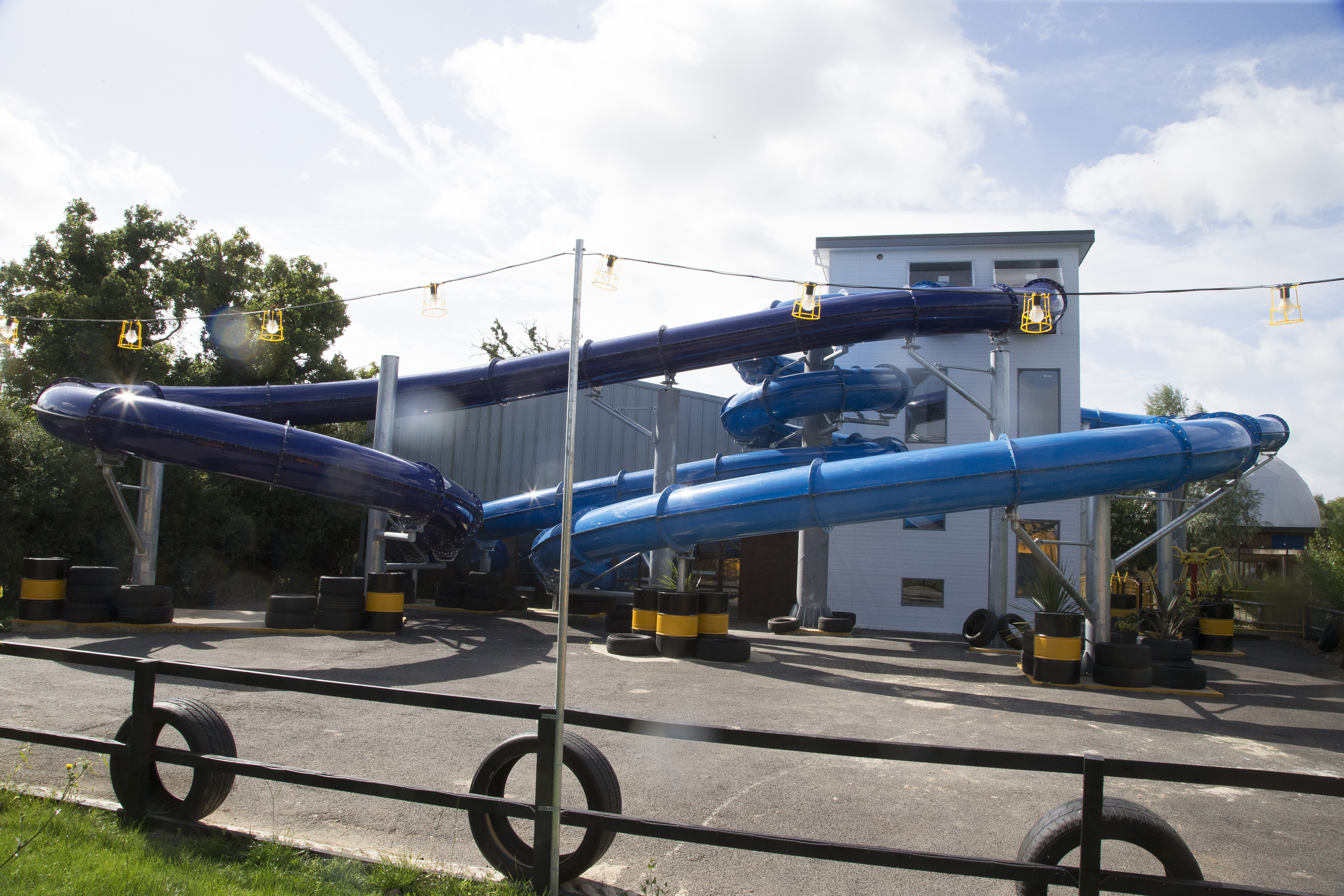
Splash Zone

In Summer 2017 the Splash Zone attraction launched 3 new waterslides. Targeted towards older children, the slides have a height restriction of 1.0 metre (3 ft 3 in).

== Theme Park Rides ==
Name	Height restriction*	Child to Adult Ratio	Notes	Image
Main Street
Carousel	Ride Alone: Over 90 centimetres (3.0 feet)	2	Child to adult ratio depends on chosen seat.	
JCB Zone
Crazy Mouse	With Adult: Over 90 cm Ride Alone: Over 120 centimetres (3.9 feet)	1		
Crazy Crane	With Adult: Over 120 cm Ride Alone: Over 130 centimetres (4.3 feet)	2		
Dodgems	With Adult: Over 90 cm Ride Alone: Over 140 centimetres (4.6 feet)	1		
Lilliput Land
Giant Tea Cups	Ride Alone: Over 120 cm	4		
Tiny Tots Play Area	Under 100 centimetres (3.3 feet)	N/A		
Cycle Monorail	With Adult: Over 90 cm Ride Alone: Over 140 cm	1	No open toed shoes allowed.	
Veteran Cars	With Adult: Under 120 cm Ride Alone: Over 120 cm	3		
Lilliput Castle
Dragon Siege	With Adult: Over 120 cm Ride Alone: Over 150 centimetres (4.9 feet), under 190 cm	2		
Gully's Jousting Castles	With Adult: (Slow cycle:: Over 90 cm (Fast cycle): Over 110 centimetres (3.6 feet) Ride Alone: Over 120 cm	1		
Gulliver's Travels	Ride Alone: Over 120 cm	1		
Discovery Bay
Rio Bravo	Ride Alone: Over 90 cm	5		
Crazy Barrels	Ride Alone: Over 120 cm	4		
Silvermine	Ride Alone: Over 120 cm	1		
Runaway Train	With Adult: Over 90 cm Ride Alone: Over 120 cm	1		
Log Flume	With Adult: Over 90 cm Ride Alone: Over 120 cm	3		
Adventure Land
Flying Raft	With Adult: Over 90 cm Ride Alone: Over 120 cm			
Jungle River	Ride Alone: Over 120 cm	3		
The Buccaneer	With Adult: Over 90 cm Ride Alone: Over 120 cm	4		
Tree Top Swings	With Adult: Over 90 cm Ride Alone: Over 120 cm	1		
Jungle Falls	With Adult: Over 90 cm Ride Alone: Over 120 cm	2		
Twist n Joust	With Adult: Over 90 cm Ride Alone: Over 120 cm	3		
Western World
Whirlwind	Ride Alone: Over 120 cm	3	Not open until 11:30	
Flying Texan Boots	Ride Alone: Over 120 cm	1	Not open until 11:30	
Deputy Drop Down	Between 90 cm and 150 cm	N/A	Not open until 11:30	
Pony Express	Between 90 cm and 150 cm	N/A	Not open until 11:30	

*On rides with no minimum height restriction, children must be able to sit in an upright position unaided.

== Incidents ==
=== Miniature Railway ===
On 10 May 2006, engineer Hugh Dow was killed whilst working on the park's miniature railway in a restricted area. He was stood on the coupling bar between two carriages when his head struck an overhead bridge as the train was driven by another member of staff. Investigative reporting from MK News following the incident uncovered training failures at the park, with an undercover reporter instructed to operate rides after not attending training. Following the HSE report, Gulliver's appointed a full time health and safety advisor.

== See also ==
- Gulliver's World
- Gulliver's Kingdom
