= International Waterski & Wakeboard Federation =

International sport governing body

- Formation: 1946; 80 years ago
- Type: Sports governing body
- Headquarters: Lausanne, Switzerland
- Members: 91 member federations
- President: Jose Antonio Perez Priego
- Website: iwwf.sport

The International Waterski & Wakeboard Federation (IWWF) is the world governing body for all towed water sports. Founded in Geneva, Switzerland in 1946, it is recognized by the International Olympic Committee (IOC) as the sole authority governing all towed water sports and has 91 affiliated member federations worldwide. The IWWF is also an affiliate member of the Global Association of International Sports Federations (GAISF) and is one of the seven founding sports of the World Games.

The IWWF's competitive and recreational towed water sports divisions include the following: Tournament (3-Event Waterskiing), Wakeboard, Barefoot, Show Skiing, Cable Wakeboard, Cableski, Ski Racing, and Disabled Skiing.

== Functions ==
Functions of the IWWF:

- Promotes and develops towed water sports worldwide through National Federations
- Develops technical rules for all towed water sport disciplines
- Organizes educational and training programs for technical officials and coaches
- Provides resources for federations for athlete and technical official development and education
- Represents federations and athletes as and when needed
- Manages towed water sport disciplines at Multi-Sport Games recognized by the IOC and its Regional Olympic Councils (World Games, Pan Am Games, Mediterranean Games, South East Asian Games, Asian Beach Games, South American Games, etc.)
- Secures hosts for and manages IWWF World Titled events – a total of 11 events biennially
- Secures hosts for and manages IWWF World Cup stops – 46 stops held and a total of $5.7 million in cash prizes disbursed to athletes since 2004
- Lobbies for inclusion in regional Multi-Sport, Youth, and Olympic Games
- Complies with the World Anti-Doping Code and supports a clean sport
- Seeks sponsorships

The current president of the IWWF is Jose Antonio Perez Priego from Mexico.

== Events ==
- Water Ski World Championships
- World Wakesurf Championships
- World Games
- IWSF World Cup (www.iwsfworldcup.com/) http://www.iwsf.com/AllWorldCup.php (2004–2015) Since 1996
- European Games
- Mediterranean Games
- IWWF Asian Championships
- IWWF European Championships

== Styles ==
1. Slalom, Trick, Jump Skiing (Water Skiing) since 1949
2. Barefoot Skiing since 1978
3. Ski Racing since 1979
4. Cable Skiing since 1988 or 1998
5. Adaptive Skiing since 1993
6. Wakeboarding since 2001
7. Cable Wakeboarding since 2001
8. Ski Racing since 2019

== Ages ==
1. Junior World Championships for Water Skiing since 1986
2. U21 World Championships for Water Skiing since 2003
3. U25 University World Championships for Water Skiing since 2004
4. 35+ World Championships for Water Skiing since 2010
5. 45+ World Championships for Water Skiing since 2010
6. 55+ World Championships for Water Skiing since 2010
7. 65+ World Championships for Water Skiing since 2014

== Regions ==
1. Asia-Pacific
2. Europe-Africa
3. Americas

== National Federations Members ==
- Federación Mexicana de Esqui Acuatico
- Federaçao Portuguesa de Ski Náutico
- Australian Waterski and Wakeboard Federation
- Costa Rica WaterSki Association
- Chinese Taipei Water-Ski Association
- Federación Colombaina de Esqui Nautico
- Turkish Underwater Sports Federation
- Czech Waterski Federation
- Waterski Federation of Belarus
- Belgian Wakekeboard Association
- Federation Francophone de ski nautique et de wakeboard
- Federación Mexicana de Ski Acuático
- Hungarian Waterski and Wakeboard Federation
- Finnish Water Ski Sports
- Victorian Water Ski Association
- Polish Motorboat and Waterski Federation
- Swedish Waterski Federation
- Federació Catalana d'Esquí Nàutic
- Federación Española de Esquí Náutico y Wakeboard
- French Wakeboard Association (Association Française de Wakeboard (AFW)
- Slovak Water Ski Federation
- Brazilian Water Ski Confederation
- Dutch Waterski Federation (Nederlandse Waterski Bond, NWB)
- Norwegian Waterski & Wakeboard Federation
- Queensland Tournament Waterski Association
- French waterski federation (Fédération Française de Ski Nautique, FFSN)
- Brazilian Water Ski Confederation
- Singapore Water Ski Federation
- Austrian Waterski Federation (Oesterreichischer Wasserskiverband, OEWSV)
- Danish Water Ski Federation
- Finnish Water Ski Sports
- Japan Water Ski Association
- IWSF Region Europe, Africa and Middle East
- Swiss Water Ski Federation
- Korea Water Ski Association
- National Collegiate Water Ski Association (USA, Div. of USAWS)
- Italian Waterski Federation
- Hong Kong Water Ski Association
- United Arab Emirates Water Ski Federation
- Austrian Water Ski Federation
- South African Water Ski Federation
- British Water Ski
- Finnish Water Ski Sports
- Water Ski and Wakeboard Canada / Ski Nautique et Planche Canada
- USA Water Ski
- German Waterski Federation
- Croatian Waterski Federation (Hrvatski Savez za skijanje na vodi)
- Danish Water Ski
- Bulgarian Water Ski Federation
- Latvian Waterski & Wakeboard Federation

== See also ==
- Association of IOC Recognised International Sports Federations
- U.S. Professional Water Ski Tour
- Wakeboarding Unleashed Featuring Shaun Murray

== Links ==
- http://www.iwsf.com/
- https://iwwfed-ea.org
- http://www.iwsf.com/WorldChampionships/
- http://www.iwsf.com/history/getMedals.php
- https://web.archive.org/web/20250000000000*/https://iwwf.sport/ Since 2019
- International Water Ski Federation (IWSF, www.iwsf.com)
- Cable Wakeboard World and European Council (CWWC and ECWC), www.cablewakeboard.net)
- IWSF World Cup (www.iwsfworldcup.com/)
- World Water Ski Racing (www.skirace.net)
