= Gulliver's World =

Theme park in Warrington, England

Coordinates: 53.406°N 2.618°W

Gulliver's World Theme Park Resort
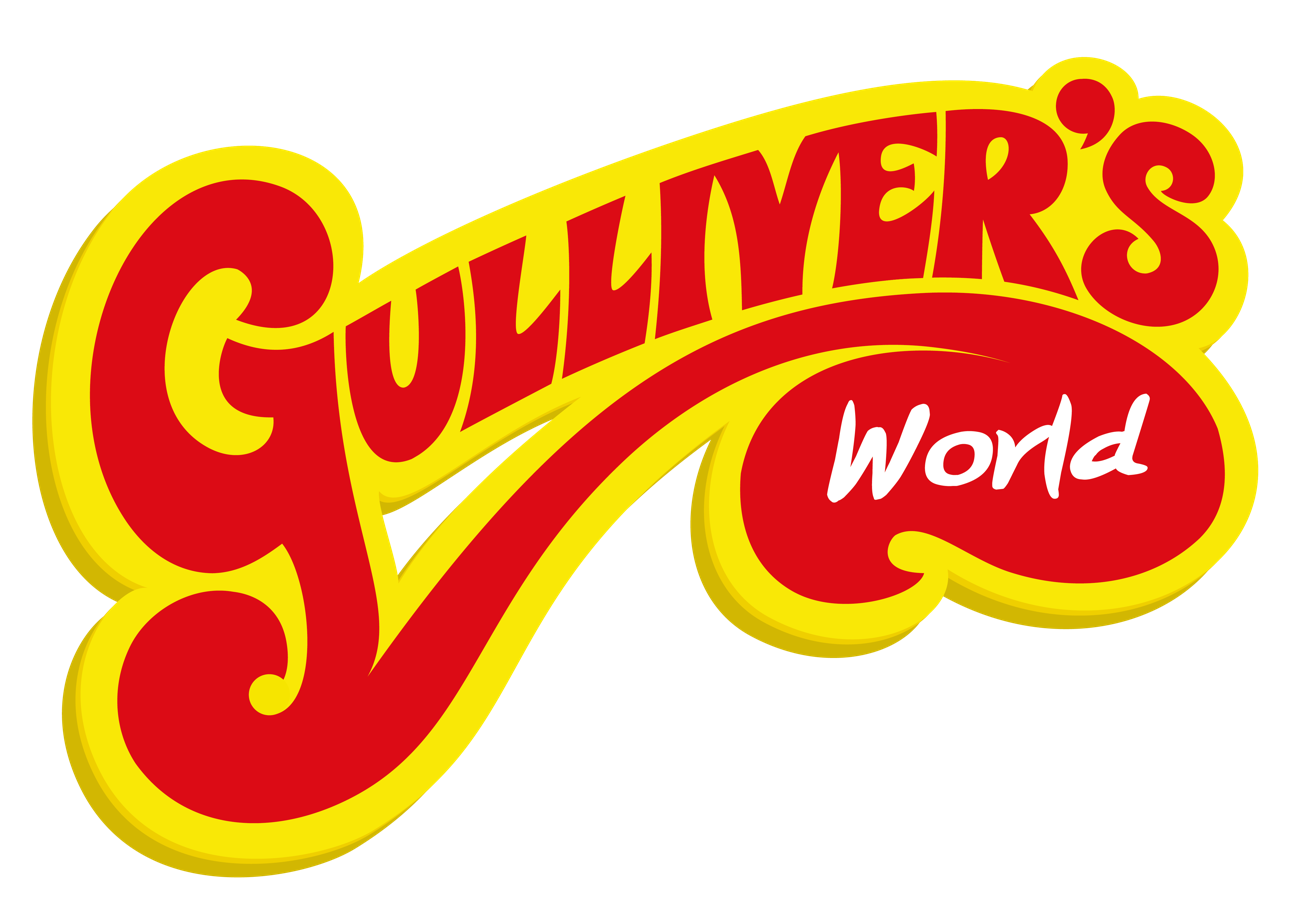

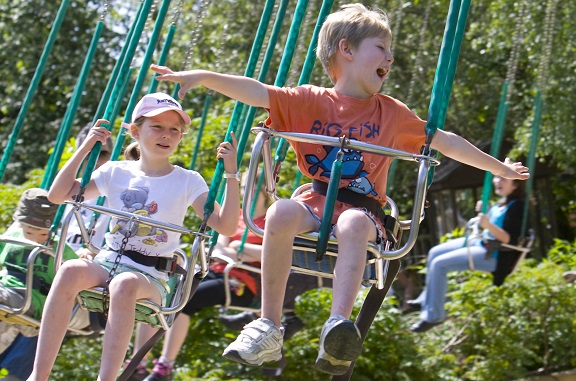
- Interactive map of Gulliver's World Theme Park Resort
- Location: Gulliver's World Resort, Warrington, Cheshire, England
- Status: Operating
- Opened: 1989; 37 years ago
- Operated by: Gulliver's Theme Parks
- Slogan: Giant Adventures for Families
- Operating season: Selected dates across the year
- Website: www.gulliversworldresort.co.uk

Gulliver's World is a theme park located in Warrington, England, loosely based on the world of Lilliput from Gulliver's Travels. It consists of the themed areas: Lilliput Land, Land of Oz, Western World, Gully's Cartoon Studios, Smuggler's Wharf, Safari Kingdom, Gully Town and Lost World. The park's attractions are designed for children between the ages of 2 and 13. Splash Zone and Blast Arena are two indoor attractions located next to the main theme park.

Gulliver's World's sister parks include Matlock Bath (Gulliver's Kingdom), Milton Keynes (Gulliver's Land) and Rotherham (Gulliver's Valley).

== History ==
Gulliver's World was opened in 1989 and is the second Gulliver's theme park to be built in the UK, with the first being Gulliver's Kingdom located in Matlock Bath. The park has expanded since then with additional attractions, bigger rides and with the opening of The Gulliver's Hotel to provide short breaks. Gulliver's have focused specifically on families with younger across their four theme parks.

Significant rides at the park include The Antelope, Desperado Drop and Apache Falls. Play areas are provided both indoors and outdoors for younger children.

In 2002 the indie rock band The Strokes visited the park and rode on a number of attractions. Footage from their day at the park was included in their 2004 tour film The Strokes: In Transit.

=== Incidents ===
On 13 July 2002, a 15-year-old girl with Down's syndrome fell 30 feet (9 m) from a Ferris wheel. She was taken to hospital, and died two days later from her injuries. The park were fined a total of £80,000 for failing to ensure a person's safety, and not carrying out risk assessments.

On 15 September 2018, The Crazy Train rollercoaster broke down after 2 wheels fell off during the ride, leaving 21 people trapped on the ride 50 feet above the ground for three hours. No one was injured.

== Rides and attractions ==
Gulliver's World has many rides.

=== Roller Coasters ===
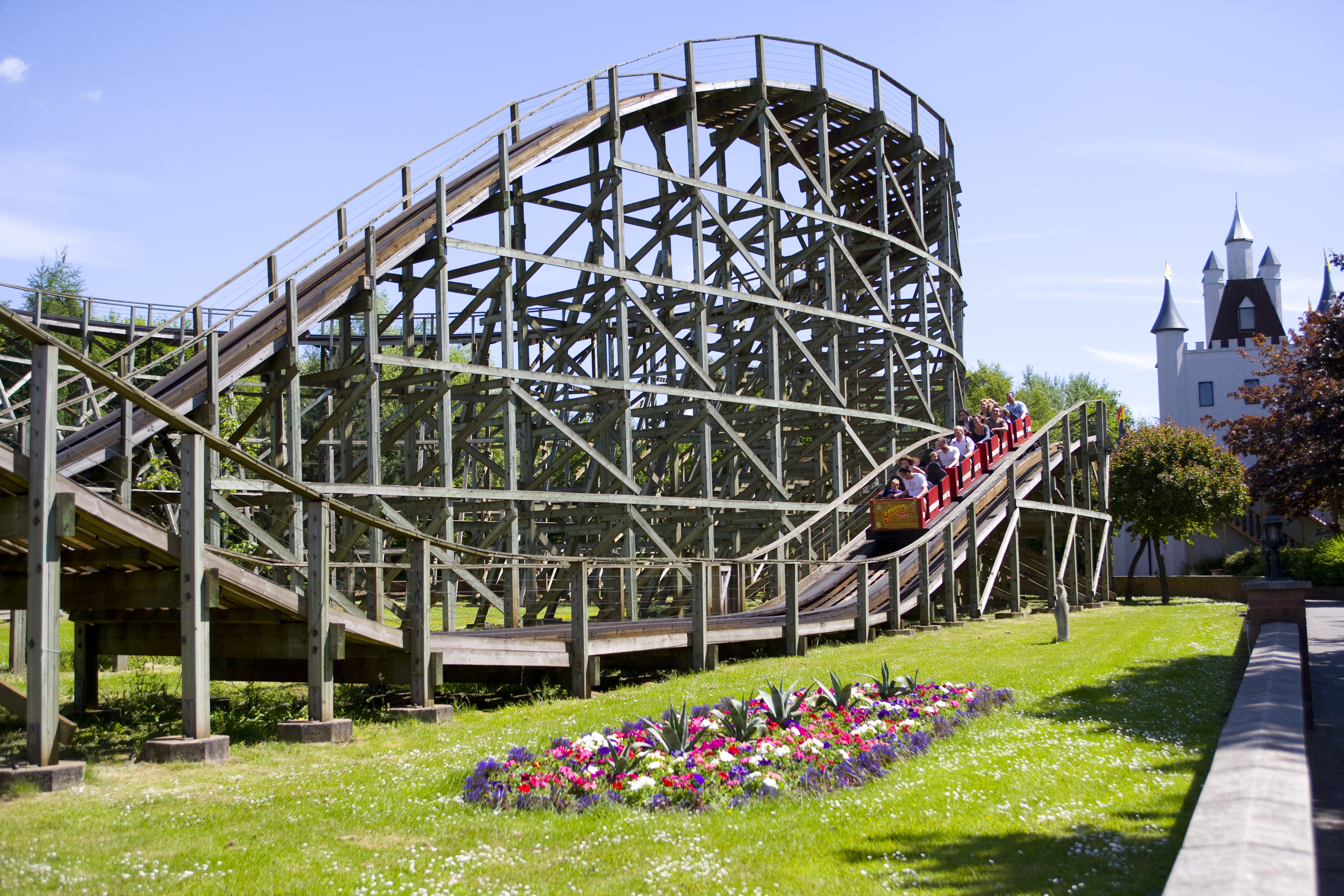
The Antelope Rollercoaster

Name	Year	Operational Status	Manufacturer	Description
Antelope	1995	Operating	Allott and Lomax	A Figure Eight Wooden Coaster.
Wriggler	2024	Operating	SBF Visa Group	Standard Wacky Worm-type coaster.
Grand Prix Racers	2023	Operating	SBF Visa Group	A family roller-coaster in the new "Gears" area.

=== Water Rides ===
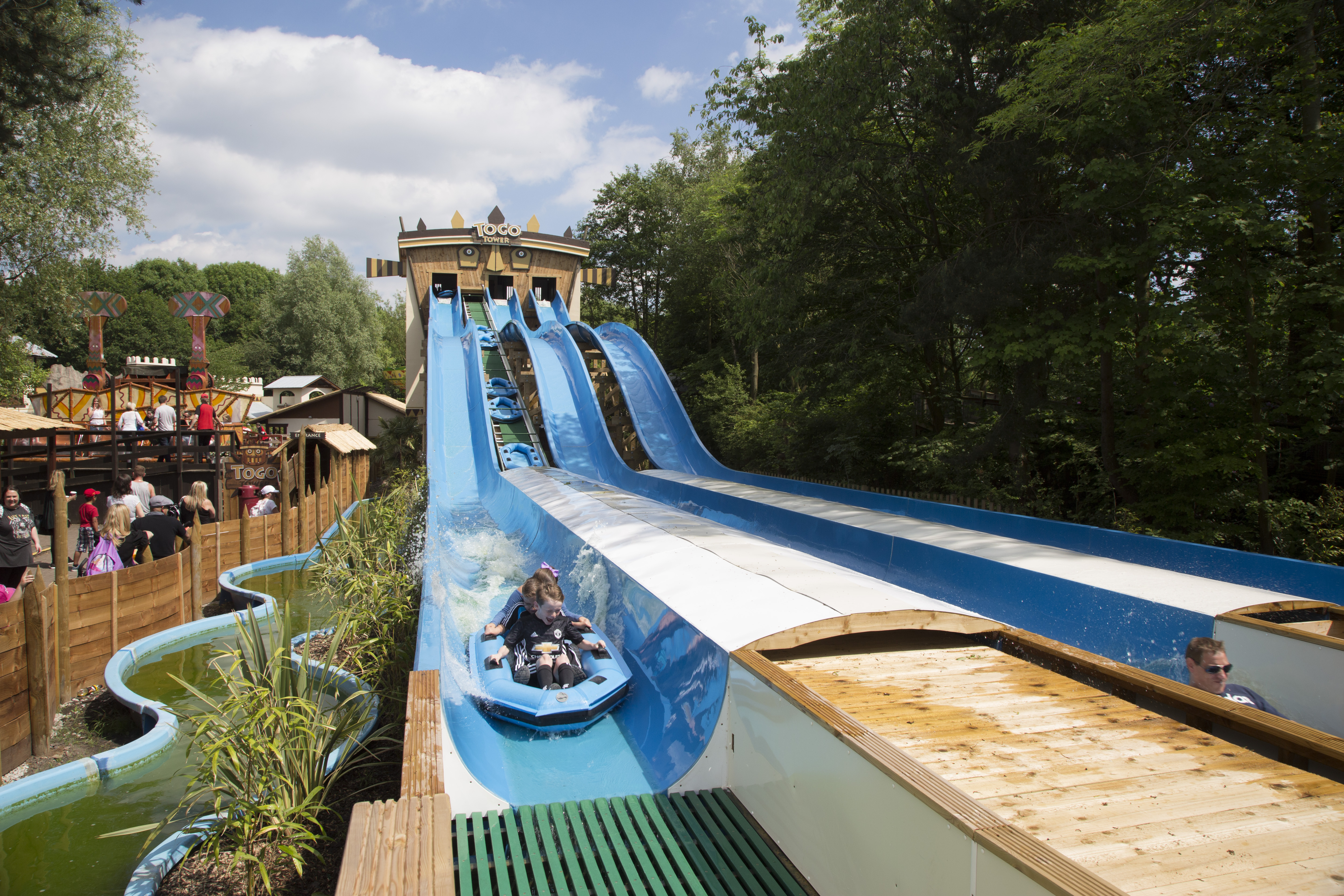
Togo Tower Ride

Name	Opened	Manufacturer	Description
Adventure Canyon	2001	Gulliver's	Lazy River-style boat ride.
Alpine Log Flume	1989	Big Country Motioneering	A Log Flume.
Apache Falls	2016	Gulliver's	A River Rapids ride.
Togo Tower	2017	Gulliver's	A set of Dinghy Waterslides.

=== Tracked Rides ===
Name	Opened	Manufacturer	Description
Dino Safari Tours	2003	Zamperla	Tracked convoy ride with a Dinosaur theme.
Gilly's Princess Ride	2014	Gulliver's	A tracked dark ride.
Gully Grand Prix	2013	Gulliver's	Racing themed dark ride.
Gulliver's Railroad	1989	Big Country Motioneering	Narrow Gauge Railway.
Temple Raider	2000	I.E. Park	Temple themed Dark Ride.
Tractor Ride	2007	SBF Visa Group	Tractor themed track ride.
Munchkin Motors	1989	SBF Visa Group / Supercar Leisure	A Classic Car ride.

=== Flat/Other Rides ===
Name	Opened	Manufacturer	Description
Dodgems	1989	Soli	Standard Bumper Cars ride.
Flight of the Pteranodon	2003	Zamperla	Kite Flyer ride.
Galleons	1989	Modern Products	Roundabout ride.
Hatchery	2000's	Mozer Rides	A Crazy Daisy ride.
Ladybird Ride	1990s	Modern Products	A ladybird-themed Roundabout ride.
Mad Hatter's Tea Party	1993	I.E. Park	Standard Teacups attraction.
Pirate Ship	1995	Zamperla	Standard Pirate Ship attraction.
Pirate's Cove	2011	Zamperla	Pirate themed Disk'O ride.
Safari Swings	2006	SBF Visa Group	Standard Chair-O-Plane ride.
Toy-town Ride	1993	Gulliver's	Animals that go in circles
Overdrive	2023	SBF Visa	Compact Midi Dance Party Gyro- Swing
Winged Monkeys	2025	SBF Visa	A Self Inverting Sky Racer Model

=== Former ===
Name	Opened	Closed	Manufacturer	Description
Aladdin's Circus Ride	2002	2011	Sartori	A Junior Railway.
Balloon Ride	1996	2016	SBF Visa Group	A Balloon-themed Ferris Wheel.
Barrel Ride	1992	2017	Gulliver's	Junior Teacups ride. Was relocated to Gulliver's Valley in preparation for its 2020 opening following removal.
Carousel Of Evolution	2007	2011	Gulliver’s	Short lived Roundabout Ride which opened in 2007 and has been left abandoned since 2011.
Chair-O-Plane	1995	N/A	SBF Visa Group	Standard Chair-O-Plane ride. Has gone through various owners in the UK fairground circuit since then.
Crazy Train	2015	2018	Pinfari	Sit Down Coaster. It was purchased from Codona's Amusement Park in 2015 and was completely dismantled for the 2019 season following an incident. The park later sold the coaster to Pleasureland Southport for the 2021 season.
Cycle Monorail	1994	2009	Sharand Engineering	Standard Cycle Monorail ride. Was scrapped following its removal.
Fire Brigade	2007	2019	Zamperla	Standard Fire Brigade ride. Placed in Storage following its removal and was later relocated to Gulliver's Valley in preparation for its 2020 opening.
Flying Elephants	2002	2013	I.E. Park	Standard Flying Elephants ride. Placed in Storage following its removal and was later relocated to Gulliver's Valley in preparation for its 2020 opening.
Giant Slide	1990	2006	Harry Steer Engineering	Standard Slide ride. Was scrapped following removal.
Leonard's Flying Raft	2003	2019	Zamperla	A Junior Miami ride. Was relocated to Gulliver's Valley in preparation for its 2020 opening.
Joker	2007	2021	Moser Rides	A Junior Drop Tower. Sold to Blackgang Chine and relocated to the park for the 2022 season.
Music Express	N/A	2013	SBF Visa Group	Roundabout ride. Placed in Storage following its removal and was later relocated to Gulliver's Valley in preparation for its 2020 opening.
Runaway Mine Carts	2006	2019	Zamperla	Mini Wild Mouse ride, similar to its bigger alternative Wild Mine Ride. Was relocated to Gulliver's Valley in preparation for its 2020 opening.
Runaway Train	1989	2003	Big Country Motioneering	Small Family Coaster. It was soon sold to private owners who sat the coaster at Tir Prince Fun Park for the 2004 season, and later travelled through the Asian fairground circuit before returning to the UK at Billing Aquadrome since 2013.
Runaway Mine Train	2004	2005	Zamperla	Steel Family Coaster with theming. It was sold to The American Adventure Theme Park for the 2006 season and following the park's closure it was sold to Flamingo Land in 2007.
Wild Mine Ride	1999	2015	L&T Systems	Wild Mouse Coaster with minecart cars. Sold to Funland Hayling Island for the 2016 season.
Wriggler	2013	2023	Pinfari	A Pinfari Wacky Worm Relocated from Camelot and now travels with Mitchell Smith.

== The Gulliver's Hotel Warrington ==
Opened in 2012, the Gulliver's Hotel forms part of Gulliver's World Resort. Accommodation is primarily designed for families, with relevant facilities and attractions nearby. Accommodation types include:

- Themed Family Suites
- Executive Suites
- Accessible Accommodation
- Interconnecting rooms

Themed rooms include the Swizzels Sweetie Suite and NERF Zone Suite.

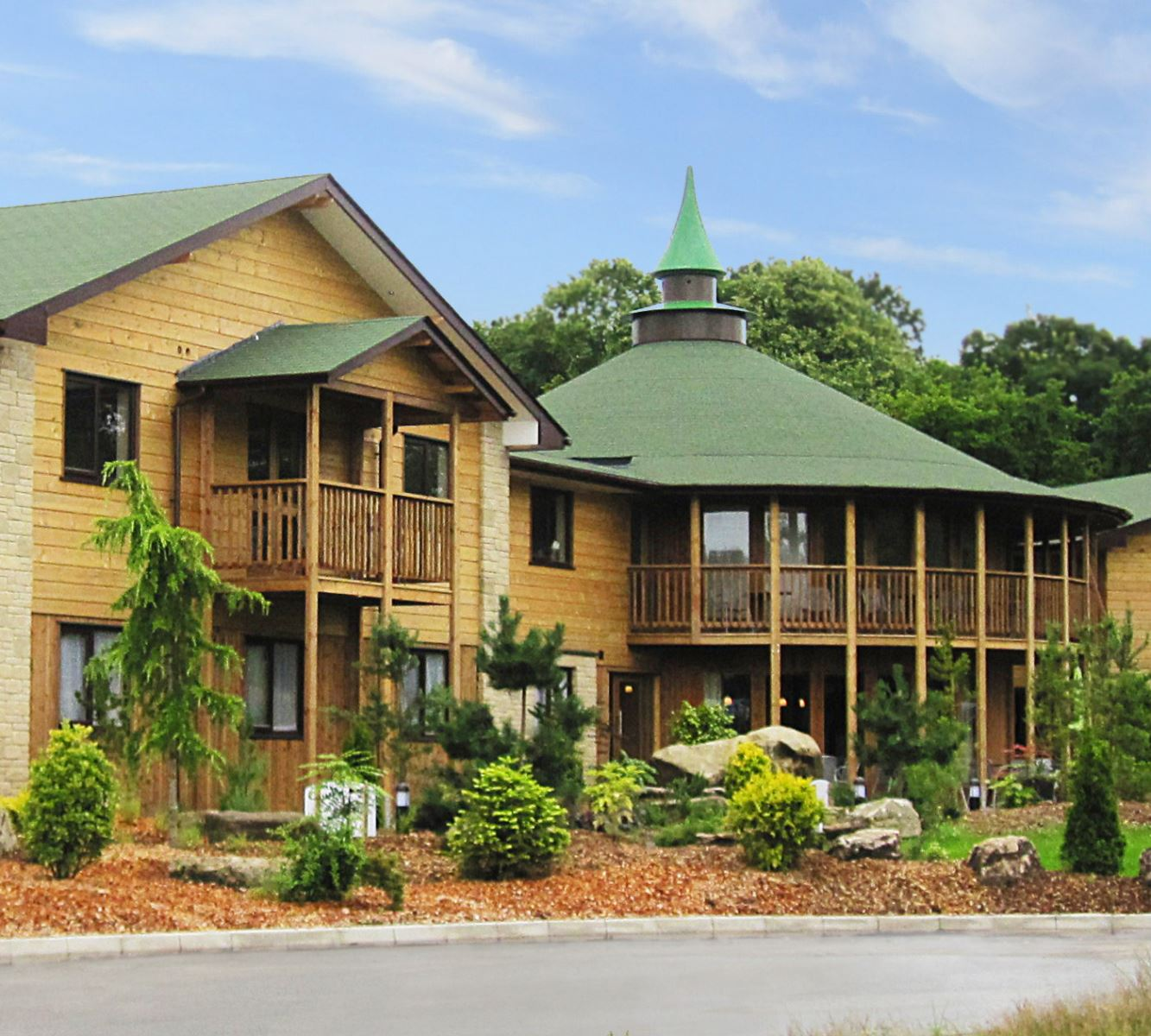
The Gulliver's Hotel

Designed around a woodland theme, selected suites have a balcony area and all have en-suite facilities.

== Splash Zone ==
Gulliver's World has expanded to include additional indoor attractions that are available throughout the year. Splash Zone is their first major indoor venue on the site, consisting of multiple water based features such as slides and sprays. There are sessions on selected term time dates that are just for pre-school children. These 'Splash Tots' sessions have been introduced in recent years due to the high demand from parents with toddlers.

In summer 2017 Splash Zone was relaunched with 6 additional waterslides.

In 2020 the Splash Zone was closed due to the pandemic. The Splash Zone has remained closed throughout the 2020 season and has not re-opened since 2020.

The Splash Zone building remains on the site as of 2026. The waterslides and splash areas are still housed inside the building. Much of the branding has been removed and the inside is used for the Land Of Lights Event at Christmas.

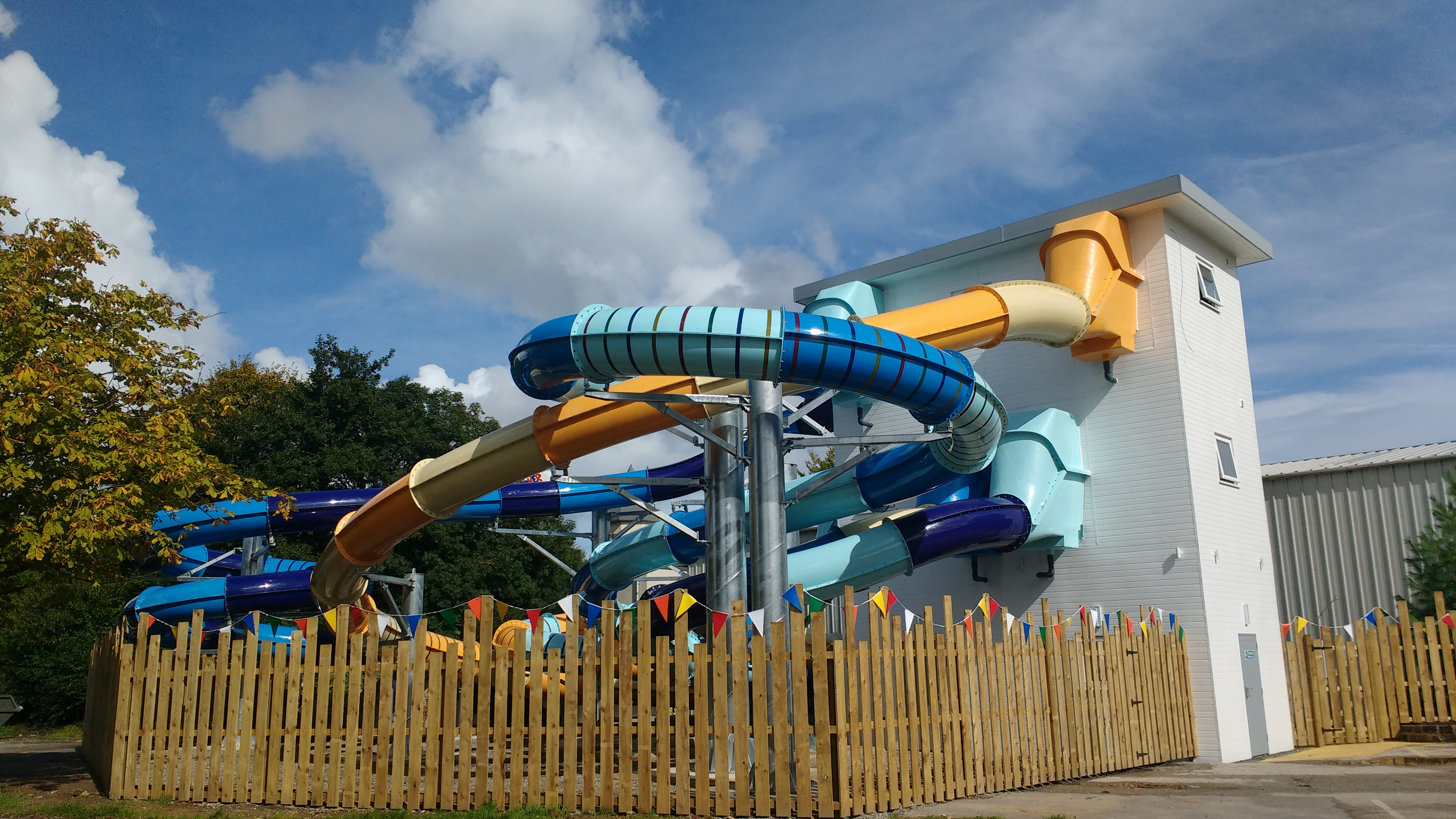
Splash Zone Warrington

== Blast Arena ==
Designed for children aged 6 and over, this indoor attraction has been a popular choice for birthday parties and group visits in Warrington. The Blast Arena provides participants with a chance to gain experience in the target range and then enter the main NERF Arena. NERF Blasters, goggles and target vest are provided for each session. There are two more NERF Zone venues operated by Gulliver's Theme Parks, they are located at Gulliver's Land Resort and Gulliver's Kingdom Resort.

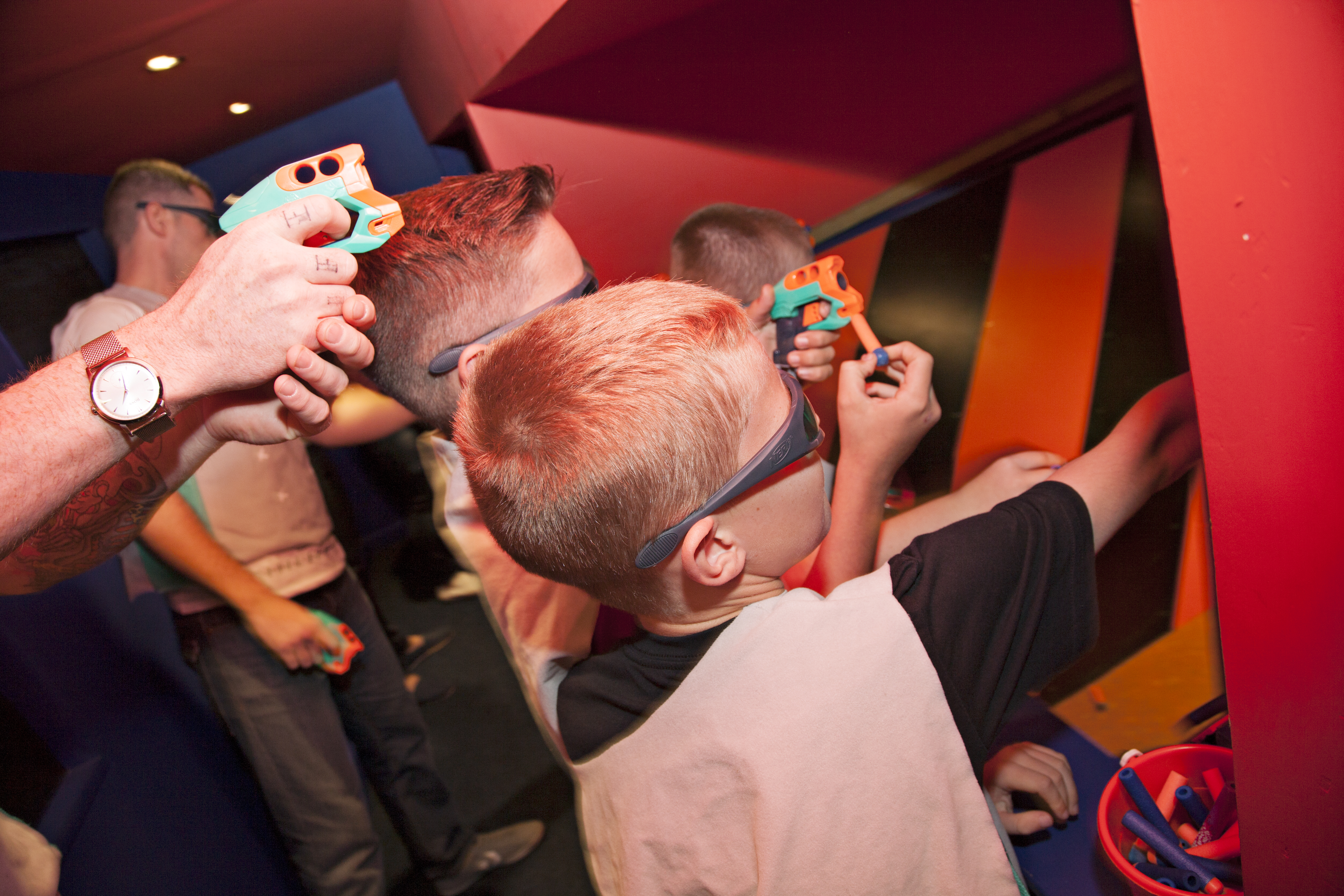
NERF Zone

== RAF Burtonwood Heritage Centre ==
The Gulliver's World site was once part of the RAF Burtonwood air base. The official RAF Burtonwood Heritage Centre was established and built on the theme park so that visitors could explore the history of the site in further detail. The centre features various collections including RAF memorabilia alongside numerous displays.
