= Wakeboarding =

Surface water sport

- Highest governing body: International Waterski & Wakeboard Federation
- First performed: 1985, United States as ski boarding

Characteristics
- Contact: No
- Mixed-sex: No
- Type: Aquatic
- Equipment: Wakeboard; motorboat or cable system; towline; life vest
- Venue: Body of water

Presence
- Olympic: none
- World Games: 2001–present

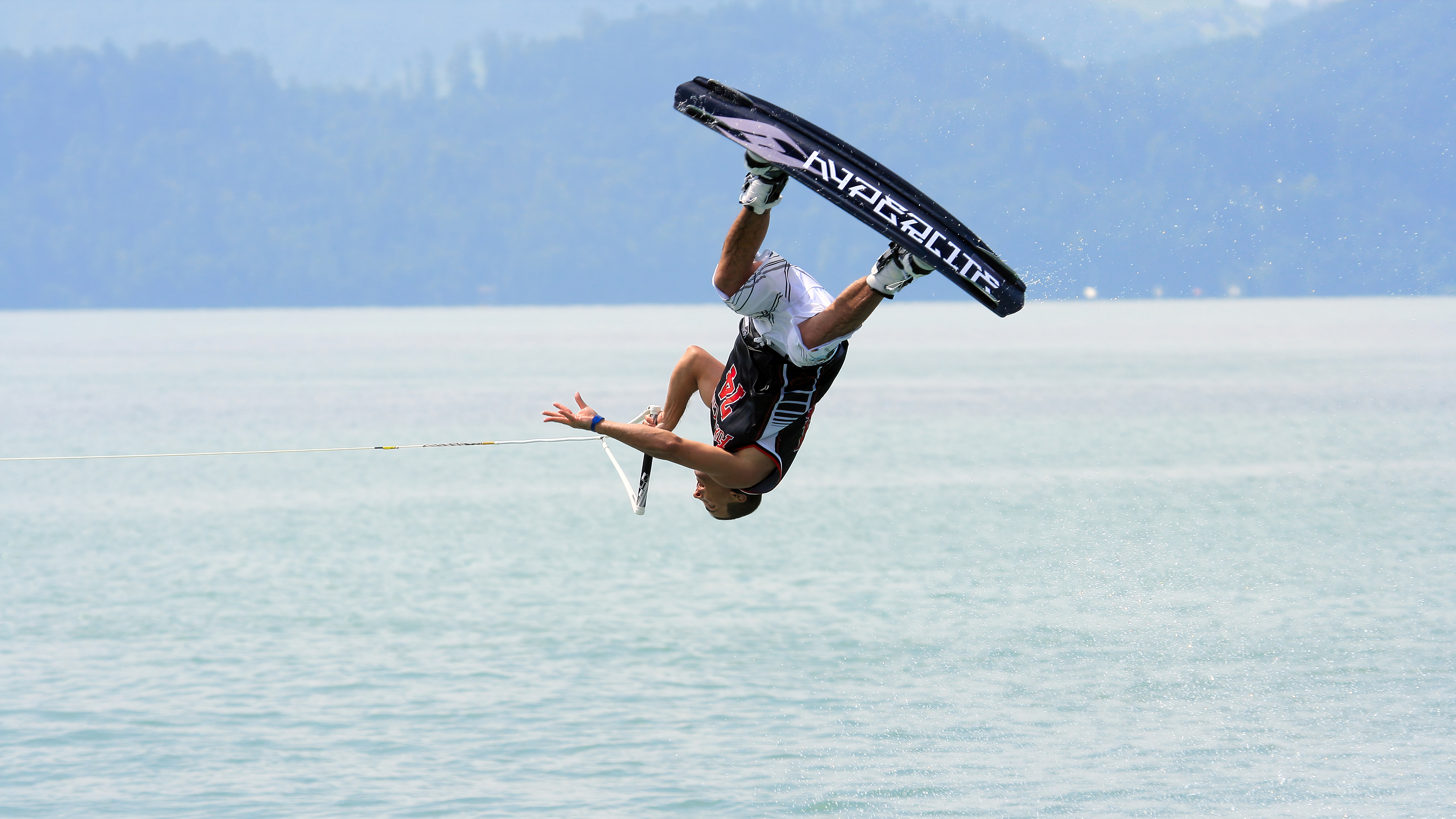
A person wakeboarding in Zug, Switzerland

Wakeboarding is a water sport in which the rider, standing on a wakeboard (a board with foot bindings), is towed behind a motorboat across its wake and especially up off the crest in order to perform aerial maneuvers. A hallmark of wakeboarding is the attempted performance of midair tricks. Wakeboarding was developed from a combination of water skiing, snowboarding and surfing techniques.

The rider is usually towed by a rope behind a boat, but can also be towed by cable systems and winches, and be pulled by other motorized vehicles like personal watercraft, cars, trucks, and all-terrain vehicles. The gear and wakeboard boat used are often personalized to each rider's liking.

Though natural watercourses such as rivers, lakes and areas of open water are generally used in wakeboarding, it is possible to wakeboard in unconventional locations, such as flooded roads and car parks, using a car as the towing vehicle.

Wakeboarding is done for pleasure and competition, ranging from freestyle wakeboarding and wakeboard parks to wakeboard competitions at the X Games, WWA Wakeboard World Championships, or similar events. Though it had an obscure start, it is now the world's fastest-growing water sport. The sport’s growth has averaged over 10% annually since 2010, outpacing nearly all other water sports.”

== History ==
=== Mono Water Ski ===
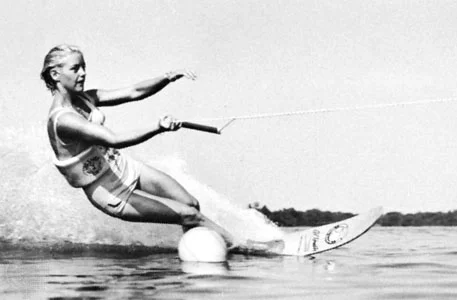
a woman riding a mono-water-ski on a slalom-course in Cypress Gardens, Winter Haven, Florida, USA, ca. 1950

The sport that would later become wake boarding began as water-skiing with mono water skis (single water skis) in the USA around 1950. The main difference between mono water skis and contemporary wake boards is the shape of the board, the stance and - to a degree - the length of the rope. Waterskiing tends to emphasize keeping clear of the towboats wake and whitewater and using the calmer water-surface while wakeboarding attempts to use wake and whitewater as artificial wave and surf by using a shorter line.

==== Surfboards as Mono ski ====
Wake surfing - using surfboards as mono water skis - began picking up traction around 1964, where it was seen as an "exciting new sport that's soon going to sweep the waterways." Although surfboards were originally used, boards without straps or bindings were first seen in New Zealand with boards called "skurfboards". Eventually, wake boards with bindings or straps were sold in Australia under the name "McSkis". Later, another company called "Skurfer" was founded by Tony Finn in 1985, named as such due to the board being a cross of a surfboard and a water ski. The first board made in the early 1990's was the Hyper lite board by the O’Brien company, a water ski manufacturer who marketed the board as a “compression-molded neutral-buoyancy wake board.” This was followed by a variety of boards that are curvier and more compact, creating a smoother ride.

The wake board rope has advanced over the years with improvements in the material makeup. When wakeboarding first started, wakeboarders used ski rope, which was made with stretchy cloth or plastic ropes. The latter soon grew in popularity, and a braided rope made out of polypropylene was eventually introduced. A few years later, a rope that was less stretchy was invented that gave the rider a more consistent pull on the rope, though they were heavier and larger in diameter. Modern ropes are coated with Spectra and Dyneema, which decrease the stretch and drag of the rope.

== Equipment ==
Wakeboarding in Tokyo, 2018

When wakeboarding, a wide variety of safety equipment is used. These include life vests or other buoyancy aids which prevent water-related injuries and deaths, as they keep the wearer buoyant until they are picked up. These vests especially help in situations where the rider is knocked unconscious or cannot tread water. Furthermore, wakeboarders use water-resistant helmets that are able to ventilate water so that the helmets do not fill up with water. Even the length of a wakeboarder's rope is important in providing safety; if the rope is too long, a wakeboarder will land on the flat part of the wake instead of the downside, and their knees will buckle.

Wakeboards themselves are also important to consider when preparing to ride. Four of the most common wakeboard styles include the continuous rocker, the three-stage rocker, the five-stage rocker, and the hybrid rocker. Rocker refers to the curve of the board from head to tail and each type of board has a different placement and amount of curve that works best for different types of rides. The presence or absence of fins on the bottom of a board can also make a drastic difference in how it rides. Beginning riders are usually better off with deeper fins. Wakeboards can also vary in the amount of fins they have which can be up to 5. Fins will make it easier to turn and stay level for beginners but should be removed for tricks and spins since they can make it easier to catch an edge on a jump or during a spin. Another part of the wakeboard itself to consider is the size of the board and the material, which are usually a wood or foam core with a fiber glass or carbon fiber coating.

At the same time, the length of a wakeboarding rope will vary based on the rider's preferences. Beginner ropes usually go from about 50’ to 75’ in total length, while more advanced riders will want a rope that goes from 65’ to 85’. A longer rope may allow for more preparation and momentum before performing tricks, whereas a shorter rope may require less speed and height to travel between wakes. In addition to this, the material of the rope being used can make a significant difference in ride experience. General guidelines recommend 50–65 ft for beginners, 65–75 ft for intermediates, and 75–85 ft for advanced riders to align with the optimal wake ramp.” The less stretch in the rope, the better it is for the rider to learn how to ride and do various tricks. Some of the best rope materials include Dyneema, Poly E, and Spectra. Each of these is known for its abrasion resistance, affordability and absorption, and durability respectively.

== Tricks ==
When wakeboarding, a variety of tricks may be attempted. Most of these stem from the wakeboarder adjusting their posture, edge, and distribution of weight so as to fly into the air upon hitting the wake. Various tricks include the toeside edge, the heelside edge, the ride switch, and the 180° spin.

More advanced tricks call for what is known as inversion or “inverts”. An invert is considered any action where the board is above the head of the rider. This does not necessarily mean the rider is fully upside down, as evidenced by the Raley, a trick where the rider extends their body parallel to the water bending at the knees to achieve inversion. The heel side backflip, otherwise known as a tantrum, is often regarded as the first and easiest invert to learn as an intermediate level rider. This is because the shape of the wake or the “kicker” (a type of floating ramp, used primarily at cable parks, that mimics the shape of a wake) naturally initiates the sequence of motions that are necessary to complete the trick.

== Community ==
People participate in this sport in various ways. Several major brands, like Byerly, O'Neill, O'Brien, Hyperlight and Ronix, offer advanced equipment and tips for both beginners and experienced riders. Many of these companies also use social media to attract new participants and grow the community.

=== Relationship to Kitesurfing ===
Many movements and tricks in wakeboarding bear close resemblance to moves also found in kitesurfing. This is reflected in close similarities between wakeboards and twin-tip kitesurf-boards. Wakeboarding in wake and waterski parks is thus often considered a more approachable wind-condition independent alternative to kitesurfing and has seen a surge in popularity in parallel to kitesurfing, especially in densely populated areas in Europe, such as Germany.

== See also ==
- Cable skiing
