= Australian Paralympic wheelchair tennis team =

Wheelchair tennis first entered the Summer Paralympic Games in 1988 as a demonstration sport and as a full medal sport at the 1992 Barcelona Games. Australia has competed at every Paralympic wheelchair tennis competition. There are two categories of medals - open division and quad division.

Notable Australian performances:

- Dylan Alcott won three gold and one silver medal at the 2016 Rio Paralympics and 2020 Tokyo Paralympics.
- David Hall has won six medals (1 gold medal, 3 silver medals and 2 bronze medals at three Games - 1996 to 2004.
- Daniela Di Toro at the London Games competed at her fifth Games (1996–2012). She won a silver medal in the women's doubles at the Sydney Games

== Medal table ==
Games	Gold	Silver	Bronze	Total
1988 Seoul	0	0	0	0
1992 Barcelona	0	0	0	0
1996 Atlanta	0	1	1	2
2000 Sydney*	1	2	0	3
2004 Athens	0	1	2	3
2008 Beijing	0	0	0	0
2012 London	0	0	0	0
2016 Rio	2	0	0	2
2020 Tokyo	1	1	0	2
2024 Paris	0	0	0	0
Totals (10 entries)	4	5	3	12

== Summer Paralympic Games ==
=== 1988 Seoul ===
Australia represented by:
Men – Michael Connell

Wheelchair tennis was a demonstration sport. Michael Connell won a silver medal in the men's singles.

=== 1992 Barcelona ===
Australia represented by:
Men - Michael Connell, David Hall
Women – Randa Hinson, Sue Twelftree

Australia didn't receive any medals.

=== 1996 Atlanta ===
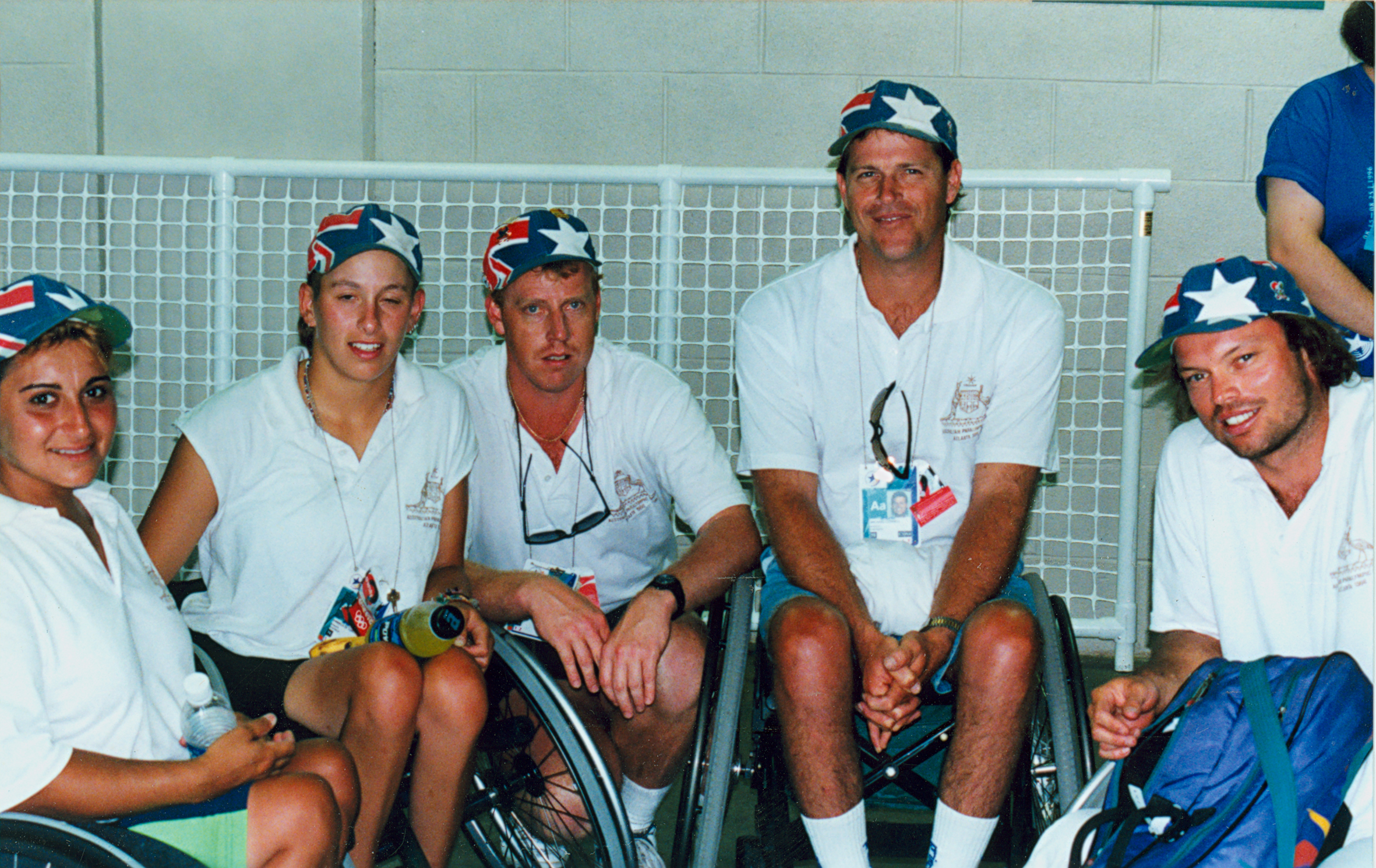
Australian wheelchair team at the 1996 Atlanta paralympic Games

Australia represented by:

Men – Mick Connell, David Hall
Women - Daniela Di Toro, Randa Hinson
Coach - Greg Crump

Australia won 1 silver medal and 1 bronze medal.

=== 2000 Sydney ===
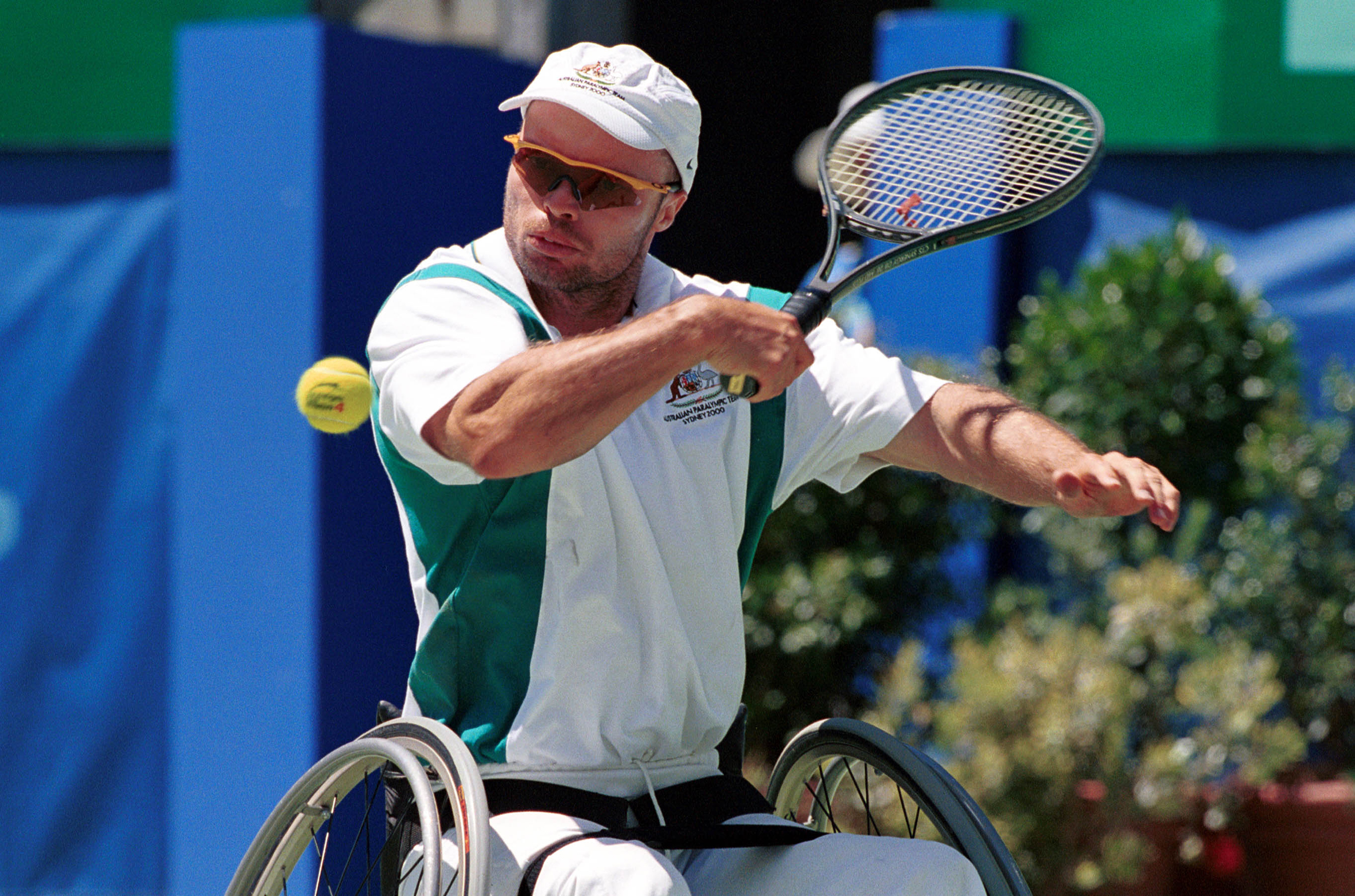
David Hall at the 2000 Sydney Paralym;pics where he won the men's singles gold medal

Australia represented in wheelchair tennis by:
Men - David Hall, David Johnson
Women – Daniela Di Toro, Branka Pupovac
Coach - Greg Crump (Head)

Australia had competitive results making three finals out of four and winning 1 gold and 2 silver medals. David Hall took one gold and one silver medal.

=== 2004 Athens ===
Australia represented in wheelchair tennis:
Men – Anthony Bonaccurso, David Hall, Ben Weekes
Women – Daniela Di Toro
Head coach- Greg Crump
Officials - Manager – Sallee Trewin
Australia won 2 silver and 2 bronze medals.

Detailed Australian Results

=== 2008 Beijing ===
Representing Australia in wheelchair tennis:
Men - Michael Dobbie, Ben Weekes
Women - Daniela Di Toro
Coach - Head Coach - Greg Crump Officials - Section Manager – Geoff Quinlan
Daniela Di Toro competed at her fourth Games. Australia did not win a medal as only Michael Dobbie progressed past the first round. Detailed Australian Results

=== 2012 London ===
Men - Ben Weekes, Adam Kellerman
Women - Daniela Di Toro, Janel Manns
Coaches – Greg Crump (Head), Craig Purcell
Officials - Section Manager – Brenda Tierney;

Daniela Di Toro competed at her fifth Games. Australia did not win any medals.

Detailed Australian Results

=== 2016 Rio ===
Men - Dylan Alcott, Heath Davidson, Ben Weekes, Adam Kellerman
Women - Sarah Calati
Coaches - Vernon Cheung (Men's), Franscois Vogelsberger (Quad)
Officials Team Leader - Brenda Tierney
Australia achieved impressive results winning two gold medals, Dylan Alcott taking the men's singles and men's quad doubles with Heath Davidson.

Detailed Australian Results

=== 2020 Tokyo ===
Men - Dylan Alcott, Heath Davidson, Martyn Dunn, Ben Weekes
Coaches- Jessica Moore (Men's), Franscois Vogelsberger (Quad)
Officials - Team Leader - Brenda Tierney
Australia achieved impressive results winning one gold and one silver medals, Dylan Alcott taking gold the men's quad singles and teaming with Heath Davidson to win silver medal in the men's quad doubles.

Detailed Australian Results

=== 2024 Paris ===
Men - Anderson Parker, Ben Weekes
Coach- Marco Persi
Officials - Team Leader- Holly Hurst

Heath Davidson withdrew on 26 August 2024 due to an illness in his family. Australia did not win any medals.

Detailed Australian Results

== See also ==
- List of Australian Paralympic wheelchair tennis medalists
- Wheelchair tennis at the Summer Paralympics
- Australia at the Paralympics
