= Janel =

Janel is a feminine and masculine given name. Notable people with the name include:

== Female ==
- Janel Bishop (born 1974), beauty queen from Manchester, New Hampshire, who won the 1991 Miss Teen USA title
- Janel Brandtjen (born 1966), American politician
- Janel Curry, American geographer
- Janel Holcomb (born 1978), American cyclist
- Janel Jacobson (born 1950), American artist
- Janel Jorgensen (born 1971), former butterfly swimmer from the United States
- Janel Leppin (born 1981), American cellist and vocalist
- Janel Manns (born 1966), Australian tennis player
- Janel McCarville (born 1982), American professional basketball player
- Janel Moloney (born 1969), American actress
- Janel Mueller (1938–2022), American academic
- Janel Parrish (born 1988), American actress
- Janel Tisinger (born 1983), American racquetball player
- Janel Tsai (born 1975), Taiwanese actress and model

== Male ==
- Janel Gauthier (born 1950), Canadian psychologist

== See also ==
- Janela (disambiguation)
- Janelle (disambiguation)
