= Janelle (given names) =

- Gender: Female

Origin
- Languages: Hebrew, Cornish
- Meaning: God is Gracious, Fair one

Other names
- Related names: Janel, Janell, Jane, Janegel, Jennifer

Janelle, and variations such as Janegel, are feminine given names, variant of Jane which derives from the Greek name Ἰωάννης (Iōannēs), derived from the Hebrew name יוֹחָנָן (Yochanan), meaning "God is merciful". Other origin of the name is Jennifer, which Janelle can derivate, meaning the "fair one".

== People ==
- Janelle Adams (born 1990), American basketball player
- Janelle Anyanonu, American politician
- Janelle Arthur (born 1989), American singer-songwriter
- Janelle Asselin (born 1983), American editor
- Janelle Atkinson (born 1982), Jamaican swimmer
- Janelle Ayres, American immunologist and microbiologist
- Janelle Bailey (born 1999), American basketball player
- Janelle Billingslea (born 1980s), American runner
- Janelle Brown (born 1973), American novelist
- Janelle Bynum (born 1975), American politician and businesswoman
- Janelle Casanave (born 1981/82), contestant on The Real World: Key West
- Janelle Chanona, Belizean journalist turned marine advocate and parliamentarian
- Janelle Cole (born 1996), American cyclist
- Janelle Commissiong (born 1953), Trinidad-and-Tobago-born beauty contestant
- Janelle Cordia (born 1987), American soccer player
- Janelle Cuthbertson (born 1990), Australian rules footballer
- Janelle Elford (born 1970), Australian swimmer
- Janelle Falzon (born 1981), Australian swimmer
- Janelle Mae Frayna (born 1996), Filipina chess player
- Janelle Fullbright (1945–2016), Cherokee politician and educator
- Janelle Jamer (born 1983), Philippine actress
- Janelle James (born 1979), American comedian, writer, and actress
- Janelle John-Bates, Trinidad and Tobago politician
- Janelle Johnson (1923–1995), American film actress
- Janelle Johnson (died 1983), American murder victim and formerly missing person
- Janelle Kellman (born 1973), American politician
- Janelle Kirtley (1943–2017), American water skier
- Janelle Knox-Hayes, American geographer
- Janelle Lawson (born 1987), Australian netball player
- Janelle Lindsay (born 1976), Australian pilot
- Janelle Lynch (born 1969), American artist
- Janelle Monáe (born 1985), American musician
- Janelle Parks (born 1962), retired American cyclist
- Janelle Patton (1972/73–2002), Australian murder victim
- Janelle Pierzina (born 1980), contestant on the U.S. reality show Big Brother
- Janelle Poole, Australian politician
- Janelle Quintana (born 1989), Philippine actress
- Janelle Redhead (born 1989), Grenadian runner
- Janelle Saffin (born 1954), Australian politician
- Janelle Salaün (born 2001), French basketball player
- Janelle Sarauw (born 1985), American politician
- Janelle Shane, American researcher
- Janelle Shepherd (born 1985), Australian judo practitioner
- Janelle Smiley (born 1981), American ski mountaineer
- Janelle Stelson, American politician
- Janelle Taylor (born 1944), American author
- Janelle Washington (born 1997), American artist and author
- Janelle Wong, American political scientist

== See also ==
- Janele, a given name
- Janell, a given name
