= List of Australian Paralympic wheelchair tennis medalists =

Wheelchair tennis first entered the Summer Paralympic Games in 1988 as a demonstration sport. Australia has competed at every Paralympic wheelchair tennis competition.

== Medalists ==
As of the 2008 Games.

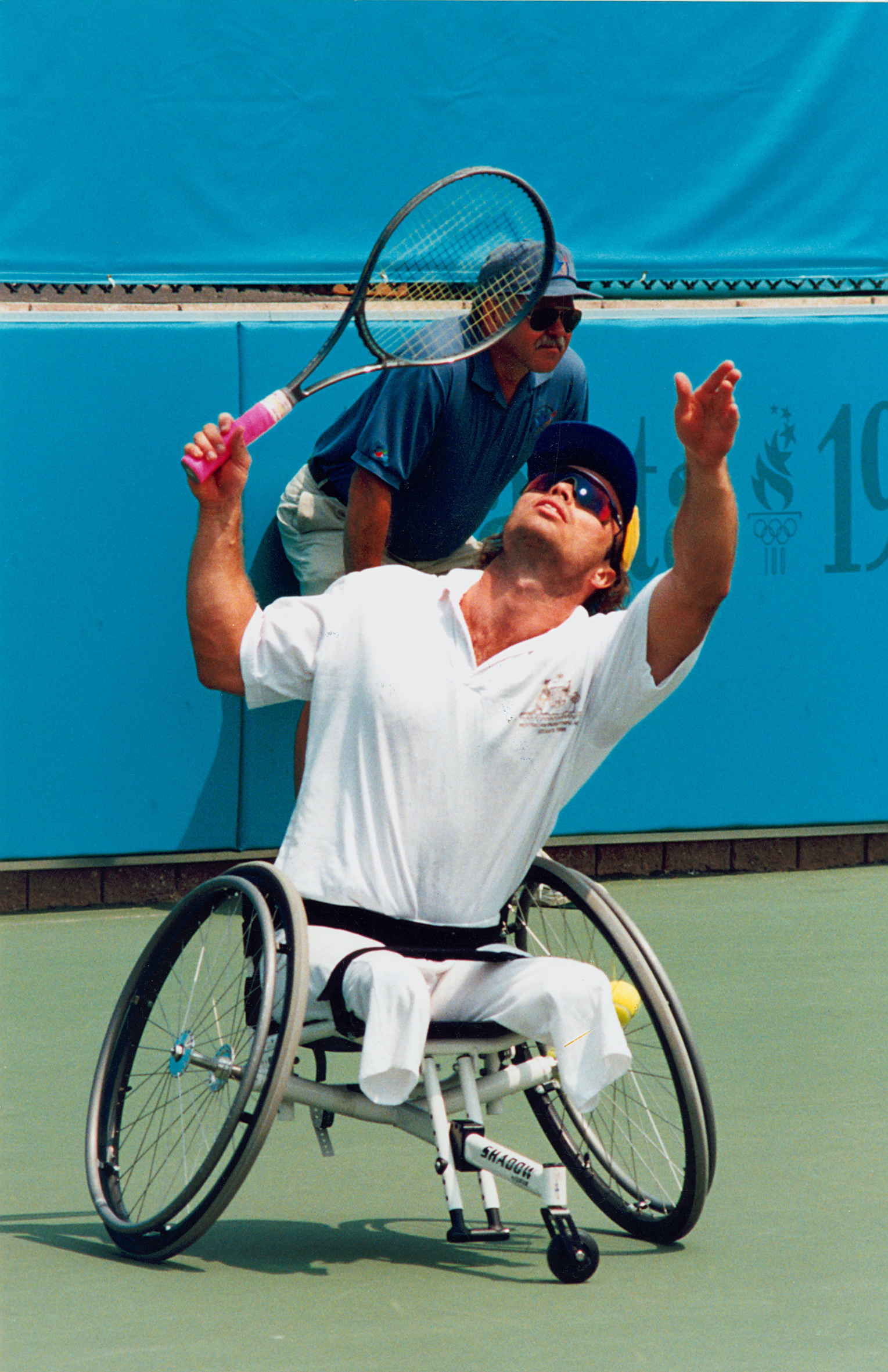
David Hall, Australia's most successful wheelchair tennis player, serving at the 1996 Atlanta Paralympic Games

Athlete	Gold	Silver	Bronze	Total
David Hall	1	3	2	6
Mick Connell	0	2	0	2
Daniela Di Toro	0	1	0	1
Branka Pupovac	0	1	0	1
David Johnson	0	1	0	1
Anthony Bonaccurso	0	0	1	1

== Summer Games ==
=== 1988 ===
Australia won a silver medal.

Medal	Name	Event
Silver	Mick Connell	Men's singles

=== 1996 ===
Australia won 1 silver and 1 bronze medal.

Medal	Name	Event
Silver	David Hall, Mick Connell	Men's doubles
Bronze	David Hall	Men's singles

=== 2000 ===
Australia won 1 gold and 2 silver medals.

Medal	Name	Event
Gold	David Hall	Men's singles
Silver	Daniela Di Toro, Branka Pupovac	Women's doubles
Silver	David Hall, David Johnson	Men's doubles

=== 2004 ===
Australia won 1 silver medal and 2 bronze medals.

Medal	Name	Event
Silver	David Hall	Men's singles
Bronze	David Hall, Anthony Bonaccurso	Men's doubles
Bronze	Daniela Di Toro	Women's singles

== See also ==
- Australian Paralympic wheelchair tennis team
- Wheelchair tennis at the Summer Paralympics
