= Janelle =

Janelle may refer to:

- Janelle (given names)
- Janelle (surnames)
- 20673 Janelle, asteroid

Fictional characters:

- Janelle, a.k.a. Janae Timmins
- Janelle Duco, in episode "From a Whisper to a Scream" of television series Grey's Anatomy

== See also ==
- The Real Janelle, music album
- Janell, a given name
- Janel (disambiguation)
