= List of U.S. National Water Ski Championships champions =

This is a list of U.S. National Water Ski Championships champions.

Year	Location	Slalom	Trick	Jump	Overall
1939	Jones Beach, New York	Bruce Parker	Bruce Parker	Jack Schiess	Bruce Parker
1939	Jones Beach, New York	Esther Yates			Esther Yates
1940	Jones Beach, New York	Charles Sligh/Karl Popelik	Bruce Parker	Bruce Parker	Bruce Parker
1940	Jones Beach, New York	Virginia Pfaff	Virginia Praff		Virginia Pfaff
1941	Holland, Michigan	Bud Pichard	Doug Fonda	Charles Sligh	Charles Sligh
1941	Holland, Michigan	Lyda Mae Helder	Lyda Mae Helder		Lyda Mae Helder
1942	Not contested due to World War II				
1943	Not contested due to World War II				
1944	Not contested due to World War II				
1945	Not contested due to World War II				
1946	Holland, Michigan	Bill Telling	Doug Fonda	Charles Sligh	Lew Withey
1946	Holland, Michigan	Willa Worthington	Willa Worthington	Katy Turner	Willa Worthington
1947	Holland, Michigan	Bud Leach	Bob Sligh	Bob Sligh	Bob Sligh
1947	Holland, Michigan	Dottie Anderson	Willa Worthington	Willa Worthington	Willa Worthington
1948	Middle River, Maryland	Bud Leach	Bob Sligh	Buddy Boyle	Dick Pope Jr.
1948	Middle River, Maryland	Dottie Anderson	Willa Worthington	Johnette Kirkpatrick	Willa Worthington
1949	Middle River, Maryland	Dick Pope, Jr.	Dick Pope, Jr.	Buddy Boyle	Dick Pope, Jr.
1949	Middle River, Maryland	Willa McGuire	Willa McGuire	Willa Mcquire	Willa McGuire
1950	Seattle, Washington	Dick Pope, Jr.	Jack Anderson	Dick Pope, Jr.	Dick Pope, Jr.
1950	Seattle, Washington	Willa McGuire	Willa McGuire	Janette Burr	Willa McGuire
1951	Lake Placid, New York	Skillman Suydam	Dick Pope, Jr.	Jack Flanagan	Skillman Suydam
1951	Lake Placid, New York	Willa McGuire	Willa McGuire	Willa McGuire	Willa McGuire
1952	Minocqua, Wisconsin	Emilio Zamudio	Emilio Zamudio	Alfredo Mendoza	Emilio Zamudio
1952	Minocqua, Wisconsin	Evie Wolford	Marguerite Williams	Marguerite Williams	Marguerite Williams
1953	Long Beach, California	Warren Witherell	Warren Witherell	Alfredo Mendoza	Warren Witherell
1953	Long Beach, California	Willa McGuire	Willa McGuire	Willa McGuire	Willa McGuire
1954	Laconia, New Hampshire	Warren Witherell	Alfredo Mendoza	Butch Rosenberg	Butch Rosenberg
1954	Laconia, New Hampshire	Willa McGuire	Willa McGuire	Joan Turbett	Willa McGuire
1955	Lakeland, Florida	Warren Witherell	Warren Witherell	Butch Rosenberg	Butch Rosenberg
1955	Lakeland, Florida	Willa McGuire	Willa McGuire	Connie Der	Willa McGuire
1956	Laporte, Indiana	Chuck Emry	Warren Witherell	Alfredo Mendoza	Alfredo Mendoza
1956	Laporte, Indiana	Leah Marie Atkins	Leah Marie Atkins	Sandra Lecklider	Elayne Roper
1957	San Diego, California	Chuck Stearns	Wally Albright	Joe Cash	Chuck Stearns
1957	San Diego, California	Leah Marie Atkins	Leah Marie Atkins	Nancie Rideout	Leah Marie Atkins
1958	Callaway, Georgia	Simon Khoury	Chuck Stearns	Joe Cash	Chuck Stearns
1958	Callaway, Georgia	Nancie Rideout	Nancie Rideout	Nancie Rideout	Nancie Rideout
1959	Laconia, New Hampshire	Joe Cash	Chuck Stearns	Mike Osborn/Buster MacCalla	Mike Osborn
1959	Laconia, New Hampshire	Nancie Rideout	Vicki Vance	Nancie Rideout	Nancie Rideout
1960	Minneapolis, Minnesota	Chuck Stearns	Chuck Stearns	Chuck Stearns	Chuck Stearns
1960	Minneapolis, Minnesota	Norine Bardill	Norine Bardill	Judy Rosch	Norine Bardill
1961	Austin, Texas	Jim Jackson	Chuck Stearns	Jim Jackson	Mike Amsbry
1961	Austin, Texas	Jenny Hodges	Janelle Kirtley	Barabara Cooper	Janelle Kirtley
1962	Callaway, Georgia	Chuck Stearns	Al Tyll	Larry Penacho	Chuck Stearns
1962	Callaway, Georgia	Jenny Hodges	Jenny Hodges	Cecile Campbell	Jenny Hodges
1963	Long Beach, California	Chuck Stearns	Al Tyll	Jim Jackson	Larry Penacho
1963	Long Beach, California	Janelle Kirtley	Janelle Kirtley	Barbara Clack	Barbara Clack
1964	Webster, Massachusetts	Joker Osborn	Al Tyll	Jim Jackson	Joker Osborn
1964	Webster, Massachusetts	Janelle Kirtley	Dicksie Ann Hoyt	Barbara Clack	Dicksie Ann Hoyt
1965	Minneapolis, Minnesota	Roland Hillier	Al Tyll	Chuck Stearns	Chuck Stearns
1965	Minneapolis, Minnesota	Barbara Clack	Dicksie Ann Hoyt	Barbara Clack	Dicksie Ann Hoyt
1966	Miami, Florida	Tom Decker	Roland Hillier	Paul Merrill	Paul Merrill
1966	Miami, Florida	Barbara Clack	Barbara Clack	Barbara Clack	Barbara Clack
1967	Austin, Texas	Chuck Stearns	Alan Kempton	Jim Jackson	Chuck Stearns
1967	Austin, Texas	Stephanie Stephens	Weslie Walker	Barbara Clack	Wesley Walker
1968	Canton, Ohio	Mike Suyderhoud	Alan Kempton	Mike Suyderhoud	Mike Suyderhoud
1968	Canton, Ohio	Liz Allan	Liz Allan	Liz Allan	Liz Allan
1969	Berkeley, California	Bruce Martin	Alan Kempton	Mike Suyderhoud	Mike Suyderhoud
1969	Berkeley, California	Liz Allan	Liz Allan	Liz Allan	Liz Allan
1970	Canton, Ohio	Mike Suyderhoud	Ricky McCormick	Mike Suyderhoud	Mike Suyderhoud
1970	Canton, Ohio	Liz Allan	Christy Lynn Weir	Liz Allan	Liz Allan
1971	Columbus, Ohio	Kris LaPoint	Ricky McCormick	Mike Suyderhoud	Mike Suyderhoud
1971	Columbus, Ohio	Christy Lynn Weir	Liz Shetter	Liz Shetter	Liz Shetter
1972	Seattle, Washington	Kris LaPoint	Robert Kempton	Ricky McCormick	Mike Suyderhoud
1972	Seattle, Washington	Christy Lynn Weir	Liz Shetter	Linda Leavengood	Liz Shetter
1973	Petersburg, Virginia	Kris LaPoint	Tony Krupa	Ricky McCormick	Wayne Grrimditch
1973	Petersburg, Virginia	Liz Shetter	Liz Shetter	Linda Giddens	Liz Shetter
1974	Pine Mountain, Georgia	Kris LaPoint	Russ Stiffler	Mike Suyderhoud	Ricky McCormick
1974	Pine Mountain, Georgia	Liz Shetter	Liz Shetter	Liz Shetter	Liz Shetter
1975	Tomahawk, Wisconsin	Kris LaPoint	Robert Kempton	Wayne Grimditch	Ricky McCormick
1975	Tomahawk, Wisconsin	Cindy Todd	Liz Shetter	Liz Shetter	Liz Shetter
1976	Miami, Florida	Bob LaPoint	Tony Krupa	Bob LaPoint	Chris Redmond
1976	Miami, Florida	Cindy Todd	Linda Giddens	Cindy Todd	Cindy Todd
1977	Berkeley, California	Kris LaPoint	Ricky McCormick	Ricky McCormick	Ricky McCormick
1977	Berkeley, California	Cathy Marlow	Pam Folsom	Linda Giddens	Camille Duvall
1978	Tivoli, Michigan	Bob LaPoint	Cory Pickos	Robert Kempton	Ricky McCormick
1978	Tivoli, Michigan	Deena Brush	Cyndi Benzel	Deena Brush	Deena Brush
1979	Du Quoin, Illinois	Bob LaPoint	Ricky McCormick	Sammy Duvall	Ricky McCormick
1979	Du Quoin, Illinois	Cindy Todd	Karin Roberge	Cindy Todd	Karin Roberge
1980	Tyler, Texas	Carl Roberge	Cory Pickos	Bob LaPoint	Carl Roberge
1980	Tyler, Texas	Cyndi Benzel	Karin Roberge	Linda Giddens	Karin Roberge
1981	Du Quoin, Illinois	Carl Roberge	Cory Pickos	Bob LaPoint	Carl Roberge
1981	Du Quoin, Illinois	Cindy Todd	Barbara Cleveland	Linda Giddens	Cyndi Benzel
1982	Du Quoin, Illinois	Kris LaPoint	Cory Pickos	Sammy Duvall	Carl Roberge
1982	Du Quoin, Illinois	Deena Brush	Cyndi Benzel	Cindy Todd	Cyndi Benzel
1983	Du Quoin, Illinois	Carl Roberge	Cory Pickos	Carl Roberge	Carl Roberge
1983	Du Quoin, Illinois	Deena Brush	Karin Roberge	Deena Brush	Karin Roberge
1984	Zachary, Louisiana	Bob LaPoint	Cory Pickos	Mike Morgan	Sammy Duvall
1984	Zachary, Louisiana	Deena Brush	Britt Larsen	Deena Brush	Deena Brush
1985	Du Quoin, Illinois	Carl Roberge	Cory Pickos	Mike Morgan	Carl Roberge
1985	Du Quoin, Illinois	Camille Duvall	Tawn Larsen	Deena Brush	Karin Roberge
1986	West Palm Beach, Florida	Carl Roberge	Tory Baggiano	Mike Morgan	Carl Roberge
1986	West Palm Beach, Florida	Kim Laskoff	Deena Brush	Deena Brush	Deena Brush
1987	West Palm Beach, Florida	Andy Mapple	Cory Pickos	Mike Hazelwood	Carl Roberge
1987	West Palm Beach, Florida	Jennifer Leachman	Britt Larsen	Lisa Simoneau	Deena Brush
1988	West Palm Beach, Florida	Bob LaPoint	Tory Baggiano	Sammy Duvall	Carl Roberge
1988	West Palm Beach, Florida	Camille Duvall	Ana Marie Carrasco	Deena Mapple	Deena Mapple
1989	Zachary, Florida	Andy Mapple	Kreg Llewellyn	Mike Kjellander	Kreg Llewellyn
1989	Zachary, Florida	Deena Brush Mapple	Tawn Larson	Deena Brush Mapple	Deena Brush Mapple
1990	Sacramento, California	Carl Roberge	Mick Neville	Carl Roberge	Carl Roberge
1990	Sacramento, California	Susi McCormick	Britt Larsen	Deena Mapple	Deena Mapple
1991	Sacramento, California	Andy Mapple	Patrice Martin	Sammy Duvall	Sammy Duvall
1991	Sacramento, California	Helena Kjellander/Jennifer Leachman	Tawn Larsen	Sherri Slone	Karen Neville
1992	Destin, Florida	Carl Roberge	Cory Pickos	Carl Roberge	Patrice Martin
1992	Destin, Florida	Susi Graham	Tawn Larsen	Deena Mapple	Julie Petrus
1993	Destin, Florida	Andy Mapple	Patrice Martin	Sammy Duvall	Patrice Martin
1993	Destin, Florida	Susi Graham	Tawn Larsen	Camille Duvall	Kim DeMacedo
1994	West Palm Beach, Florida	Ben Favret	Mike Morgan	J.D. Wiswall	Travis Moye
1994	West Palm Beach, Florida	Karen Truelove	Lori Zoellner	Lynda Davidson	Karen Truelove
1995	West Palm Beach, Florida	Wade Cox	Russell Gay	Fred Krueger	Fred Krueger
1995	West Palm Beach, Florida	Jennifer Leachman	Rhoni Barton	Brenda Baldwin	Rhoni Barton
1996	Beaches of South Walton, Florida	Chris Parrish/Jeff Rodgers	Cory Pickos	Markham Smith	Travis Moye
1996	Beaches of South Walton, Florida	Kristi Overton-Johnston	Tawn Larsen-Hawn	Brenda Baldwin	Rhoni Barton
1997	West Palm Beach, Florida	Wade Cox	Russell Gay	Ronald Thompson II	Micheal McCormick
1997	West Palm Beach, Florida	Karen Truelove	Rhoni Barton	Rhoni Barton	Rhoni Barton
1998	West Palm Beach, Florida	Jeff Rodgers	Russell Gay	Scot Ellis	Micheal McCormick
1998	West Palm Beach, Florida	Jennifer Leachman	Tawn Larsen	Susie Lohr	Karen Truelove
1999	Bakersfield, California	Wade Cox	Russell Gay	Ryan Fitts	Scott Smith
1999	Bakersfield, California	Karen Truelove	Rhoni Barton	Karen Truelove	Rhoni Barton
2000	Bakersfield, California	Jason Paredes	Russell Gay	Freddy Krueger	Jimmy Siemers
2000	Bakersfield, California	Karen Truelove	Mandy Nightingale	Lori Krueger	Rhoni Barton
2001	Bakersfield, California	Jeff Rodgers	Russell Gay	Freddy Krueger	Jimmy Siemers
2001	Bakersfield, California	Regina Jaquess	Brandi Hunt	Brenda Baldwin	Regina Jaquess
2002	Houston, Texas	Jamie Beauchesne	Jimmy Siemers	Michael Heath	Michael McCormick
2002	Houston, Texas	Jill Knutson	Mandy Nightingale	Brandi Hunt	Rhoni Barton
2003	Houston, Texas	Ben Favret	Jimmy Siemers	Jimmy Siemers	Jimmy Siemers
2003	Houston, Texas	Natalie Hamrick	Tarah Benzel	Jennifer Kaiser	Tarah Benzel
2004	West Palm Beach, Florida	Chris Parrish	Russell Gay	John Burris	John Burris
2004	West Palm Beach, Florida	April Coble-Eller	Regina Jaquess	Rhoni Barton	Rhoni Barton
2005	West Palm Beach, Florida	Chris Parrish	Jimmy Siemers	Jimmy Siemers	Jimmy Siemers
2005	West Palm Beach, Florida	April Coble	Jane Gay	Tarah Benzel	Tarah Benzel
2006	Arvin, California	Chris Parrish	Jimmy Siemers	Jimmy Siemers	Jimmy Siemers
2006	Arvin, California	Joy Todd	Joy Todd	Joy Todd	Mandi Williams
2007	Arvin, California	Nick Parsons	Jimmy Siemers	Scot Ellis	Jimmy Siemers
2007	Arvin, California	Alex Lauretano	Alex Lauretano	Alex Lauretano	Alex Lauretano
2008	West Palm Beach, Florida	Nick Parsons	Storm Selsor	Freddy Krueger	Brian Kinney
2008	West Palm Beach, Florida	April Coble-Eller	Joy Todd-Strickland	Regina Jaquess	Regina Jaquess
2009	West Palm Beach, Florida	Chris Rossi	Russell Gay	Brian Kinney	Brian Kinney
2009	West Palm Beach, Florida	April Coble-Eller	Danyelle Bennett	Joy Todd-Strickland	Joy Todd-Strickland
2010	Wilmington, Illinois	Chris Parrish	Russell Gay	Freddy Krueger	Storm Selsor
2010	Wilmington, Illinois	Rhoni Bischoff	Danyelle Bennett	Alex Lauretano	Danyelle Bennett
2011	Wilmington, Illinois	Chris Parrish	Adam Pickos	Freddy Krueger	Tyler Lorenz
2011	Wilmington, Illinois	April Coble-Eller	Alex Lauretano	Lauren Morgan	Joy Todd-Strickland
2012	West Palm Beach, Florida	Chris Parrish	Adam Pickos	Stephen Seal	Stephen Seal
2012	West Palm Beach, Florida	April Coble-Eller	Joy Todd-Strickland	Lauren Morgan	Danyelle Bennett
2013	West Palm Beach, Florida	Nate Smith	Adam Pickos	Freddy Krueger	Brian Kinney
2013	West Palm Beach, Florida	Regina Jaquess	Regina Jaquess	Regina Jaquess	Regina Jaquess
2014	Martindale, Texas	Nate Smith	Russell Gay	Freddy Krueger	Jimmy Siemers
2014	Martindale, Texas	Regina Jaquess	Erika Lang	Regina Jaquess	Regina Jaquess
2015	West Palm Beach, Florida	Nate Smith	Adam Pickos	Michael Stevenson	Dylan Schaffer
2015	West Palm Beach, Florida	Regina Jaquess	Regina Jaquess	Regina Jaquess	Regina Jaquess
2016	Caldwell, Idaho	Brian Detrick	Nicholas Lang	Nicholas Lang	Nicholas Lang
2016	Caldwell, Idaho	Allie Nicholson	Ellie Horton	Makayla Haw	Makayla Haw
2017	Martindale, Texas	Nate Smith	Kevin Malak	Nick Lang	
2017	Martindale, Texas	Kelly Zoellner	Danyelle Bennett	Erika Lang	Lauren Morgan
2018	Maize, Kansas	Nate Smith	Adam Pickos	Freddy Krueger	Samuel Greenwood
2018	Maize, Kansas	Regina Jacquess	Erika Lang	Regina Jacquess	Regina Jacquess
2019	West Palm Beach, Florida	Nate Smith	Kevin Jack	Freddy Krueger	Dylan Schaffer
2019	West Palm Beach, Florida	Regina Jacquess	Anna Gay	Lauren Morgan	Regina Jacquess
2020	Zachary, Louisiana	Nate Smith	Kevin Jack	Freddy Krueger	Sam Greenwood
2020	Zachary, Louisiana	Regina Jacquess	Anna Gay	Regina Jacquess	Regina Jacquess
2021	Wilmington, Illinois	Nate Smith	Adam Pickos	Freddy Krueger	Garrett Reese
2021	Wilmington, Illinois	Brooke Baldwin	Anna Gay	Lauren Morgan	Brooke Baldwin
2022	Maize, Kansas	Nate Smith	Kevin Jack	Freddy Krueger	Cale Burdick
2022	Maize, Kansas	Regina Jaquess	Erika Lang	Lauren Morgan	Anna Gay
2023	West Palm Beach, Florida				
