= Janell =

Janell is a feminine given name. Notable people with the name include:

- Janell Burse (born 1979), American professional basketball player
- Janell Cannon (born 1957), American children's writer and illustrator
- Janell Moon, American author of spiritual non-fiction and poetry
- Janell Smith (1947–2020), American Olympic sprinter
- Janell Wheeler (born 1985), American musician among American Idol semi-finalists
- Janell Shirtcliff (born 1982 or 1983), American filmmaker, photographer, and music video director

== See also ==
- Janele, a given name and surname
- Janelle (given names)
