= Janelle (surname) =

Janelle and Janel are surnames. Those bearing them include:

- Emil Janel (1897–1981), Swedish-born American artist
- Richard Janelle (born 1947), Canadian politician
- Al Janelle (born c. 1990), musician in September Hase

== See also ==
- Janelle (given name)
- Janele
