= Billingslea =

Billingslea is a surname. Notable people with the surname include:

- Alma Jean Billingslea (born 1946), American Civil Rights activist and teacher
- Beau Billingslea (born 1944), American actor
- Charles Billingslea (1914–1989), United States Army major general
- Charlton W. Billingslea (died 1889), American politician and judge
- Janelle Billingslea (born 1980s), American sprinter
- Joe Billingslea (born 1937), American singer and performer
- Marshall Billingslea, American government official
