= Wheelchair tennis at the 1988 Summer Paralympics – Men's singles =

Wheelchair tennis – Men's singles at the VIII Paralympic Games
- Paralympic wheelchair tennis

Medalists
1st place, gold medalist(s)		Laurent Giammartini	France
2nd place, silver medalist(s)		Mick Connell	Australia
3rd place, bronze medalist(s)		Chip Turner	United States
3rd place, bronze medalist(s)		Sasson Aharoni	Israel

Men's singles
- Wheelchair tennis at the 1988 Summer Paralympics

Events
Singles	men	women
- Summer Paralympics

The men's singles wheelchair tennis competition at the 1988 Summer Paralympics in Seoul from 15 until 24 October 1988. It was a demonstration sport and there wasn't a match for the third place (two bronze medals were awarded)

== Draw ==
=== Key ===
- INV = Bipartite invitation
- IP = ITF place
- ALT = Alternate
- r = Retired
- w/o = Walkover

=== Finals ===
Semifinals
Mick Connell (AUS)	6	7	6
Chip Turner (USA)	7	6	0
Laurent Giammartini (FRA)	6	6
Sasson Aharoni (ISR)	0	0

Final (gold medal match)
Mick Connell (AUS)	2	2
Laurent Giammartini (FRA)	6	6
