= Janela =

Janela may refer to:

- Janela, Cape Verde, a village in Santo Antão, Cape Verde
- Ribeira da Janela, a parish in the district of Porto Moniz in Madeira
- Ribeira da Janela, Cape Verde, a river in Santo Antão, Cape Verde
