= Anthony Bonaccurso =

Australian wheelchair tennis player

Personal information
- Nationality: Australia
- Born: 28 November 1975 (age 50) Sunshine, Victoria
Medal record
Wheelchair tennis
Paralympic Games
Bronze medal – third place	2004 Athens	Men's Doubles

Anthony Bonaccurso is a Paralympic alpine skier and tennis player competitor from Australia. He won a bronze medal at the 2004 Athens Games in the Men's Doubles event. He is one of the few Australian Paralympians to compete at both Summer and Winter Games.

== Personal ==
He was born on 28 November 1975 in Sunshine, Victoria. At the age of 17, he climbed a pole at a railway station and was electrocuted and fell to the ground. The fall resulted in spinal injuries.

== Tennis ==
He took up wheelchair tennis in 1993 and joined the tour at the age of 23. In 2002, he was a member of the Australian team that won the World Team Cup in Italy. At the 2004 Athens Summer Games, he teamed with David Hall to win the bronze medal in the Men's Doubles. He was a top 20 player and won six consecutive Victorian Hardcourt Championships. He is currently a tennis coach for wheelchair and able-bodied tennis players.

Australian wheelchair tennis coach Greg Crump commented that "His attitude is, that's what you've got, get on with it. He played tennis as part of his rehab and carried on from there. He's very strong, fit, fast and focused."

Bonaccurso is a player ambassador for the International Tennis Federation wheelchair program. In 2015, he and renowned tennis coach Greg Crump, visited Cambodia to raise awareness about wheelchair tennis through a series of coaching clinics and interactive sessions with boys and girls taking part in the ITF-Tennis Cambodia program.

== Alpine skiing ==
He first represented Australia at the 1998 Nagano Winter Games where he competed in three alpine skiing events. His best result was 17th in the Men's Slalom LW11. After the Games, he returned to wheelchair tennis.
