= Janel Curry =

American geographer

Janel M. Curry is an American geographer and academic administrator. She currently leads the American Scientific Affiliation (ASA) as its president, having spent much of her earlier career in academic administration — most notably as provost of Gordon College and, later, interim vice president for academic affairs at Medaille College.

== Early life and education ==
Curry is a 1977 graduate of Bethel College (now Bethel University), where she earned a B.A. in political science with high honors. She then moved on to the University of Minnesota for graduate work in geography, completing her M.A. in 1981 and her Ph.D. in 1985.

== Academic career ==
Curry's teaching career started at Central College in Pella, Iowa, where she joined the geography faculty in 1985. Eleven years later she moved to Calvin College in Grand Rapids, Michigan, as a professor of geography and environmental studies. At Calvin she held two endowed chairs over the years — the Spoelhof Teacher-Scholar Chair (1996–97) and, later, the Byker Chair in Christian Perspectives in Business, Economics, and Political Science (2008–2012) — and from 2000 to 2009 served as the college's dean of research and scholarship.

Her Fulbright record dates back to 1995, when she received a Fulbright Research Fellowship to study at the University of Guelph in Ontario, comparing how differing societal philosophies in the United States and Canada shaped natural resource policy.

Curry became provost of Gordon College in 2012, a post she held until 2020, taking her final year as sabbatical. From there she went on to Medaille College in Buffalo, New York, serving as interim vice president for academic affairs from 2020 to 2021.

It was during her time at Gordon that Curry received her third career Fulbright award: a 2019 Fulbright Specialist appointment supporting the development of a leadership center at Forman Christian College in Lahore, Pakistan. Gordon's own announcement of the award traced her earlier Fulbright work back to a fellowship in general education at City University of Hong Kong.

== American Scientific Affiliation ==
Curry joined the ASA as executive director in 2022, taking over from interim director John Wood, and has since held the title of president. Coverage of the appointment noted she had already been an ASA fellow and member for 25 years by that point.

Speaking with Science Times in 2026, Curry described the ASA's mission in terms of making room for scientists of Christian faith — creating space, as she put it, for the language of science and the language of faith to coexist without either needing to override the other.

== Research ==
Curry's scholarship covers rural and agricultural geography, environmental policy, and how religious worldviews shape natural resource management. Her focus shifted somewhat in the 2010s toward questions of gender and institutional leadership: working with Amy Reynolds, she co-led the Women in Leadership National Study, which surveyed leadership demographics across evangelical organizations and found that most did not publicly state whether leadership roles were open to women. The study drew attention from Christianity Today, which interviewed Curry about the findings in September 2014, and was cited again two years later in a Religion News Service piece on leadership diversity within evangelical institutions.

== Selected publications ==
- Curry, Janel M., and Paul Hanstedt, eds. Reading Hong Kong, Reading Ourselves. City University of Hong Kong Press, 2014.
- Curry, Janel M., and Ronald A. Wells, eds. Faithful Imagination in the Academy: Explorations in Religious Belief and Scholarship. Lexington Books, 2008.
- Curry, Janel M., and Steve McGuire. Community on Land: Community, Ecology, and the Public Interest. Rowman and Littlefield, 2002.
