= Janel Manns =

Australian wheelchair tennis player

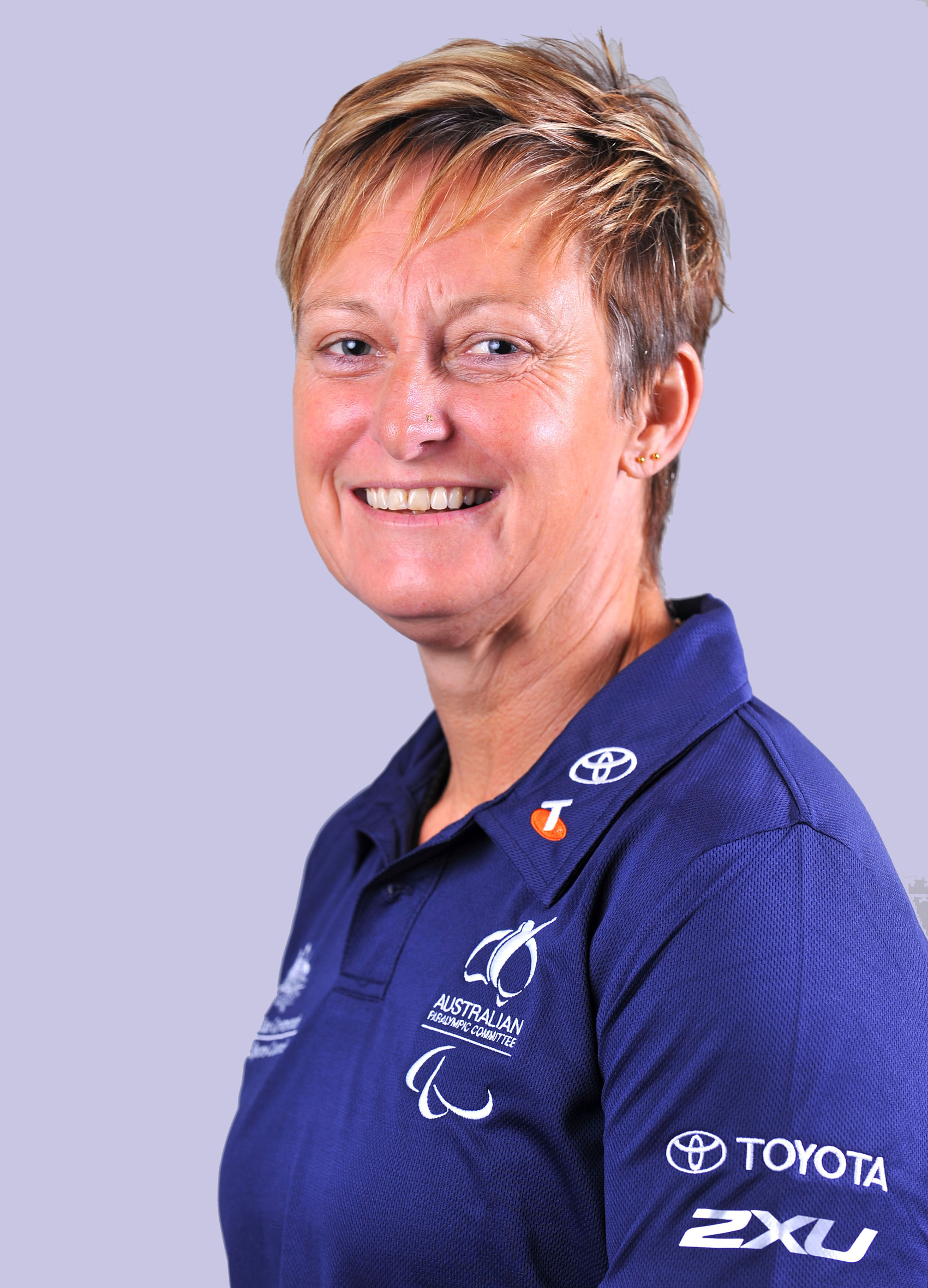
- 2012 Australian Paralympic team portrait of Manns
- Full name: Janel Manns
- Country (sports): Australia
- Residence: Port Macquarie, New South Wales
- Born: 28 May 1966 (age 59)
- Turned pro: 2006
- Plays: Left Handed

Singles

Other tournaments

Doubles

Other doubles tournaments
- Last updated on: 13 July 2012.

Janel Manns (born 28 May 1966) is an Australian wheelchair tennis player. She has been selected to represent Australia at the 2012 Summer Paralympics in tennis.

== Personal ==
Manns was born on 28 May 1966 and is from Port Macquarie, though she has lived in Sydney prior to moving back home. She is left-handed. Following a bathroom accident at the age of thirty-two as a result of not safely crossing a wet floor, she became an incomplete paraplegic. She works for Port Macquarie TAFE as a teacher, temporarily leaving her position in late June 2012 in order to prepare for the London Paralympics.

== Tennis ==
Manns is a wheelchair tennis player. She started playing the sport in 2005, and debuted with the national team in 2006. Prior to taking up tennis, she played wheelchair basketball. She switched sports because it was easier to find local competitors in Port Macquarie. She was invited to a Melbourne training camp after head tennis coach Greg Crump heard she was switching sports. Crump continues to coach her when she represents Australia. In training, she has competed against able bodied players from her local club.

Manns is a member of Kendall Tennis. The club attempted to assist in funding some of her travels but had some difficulty in finding potential sponsors. Her regular coach from the club is John Manderson, who also serves on the clubs committee.

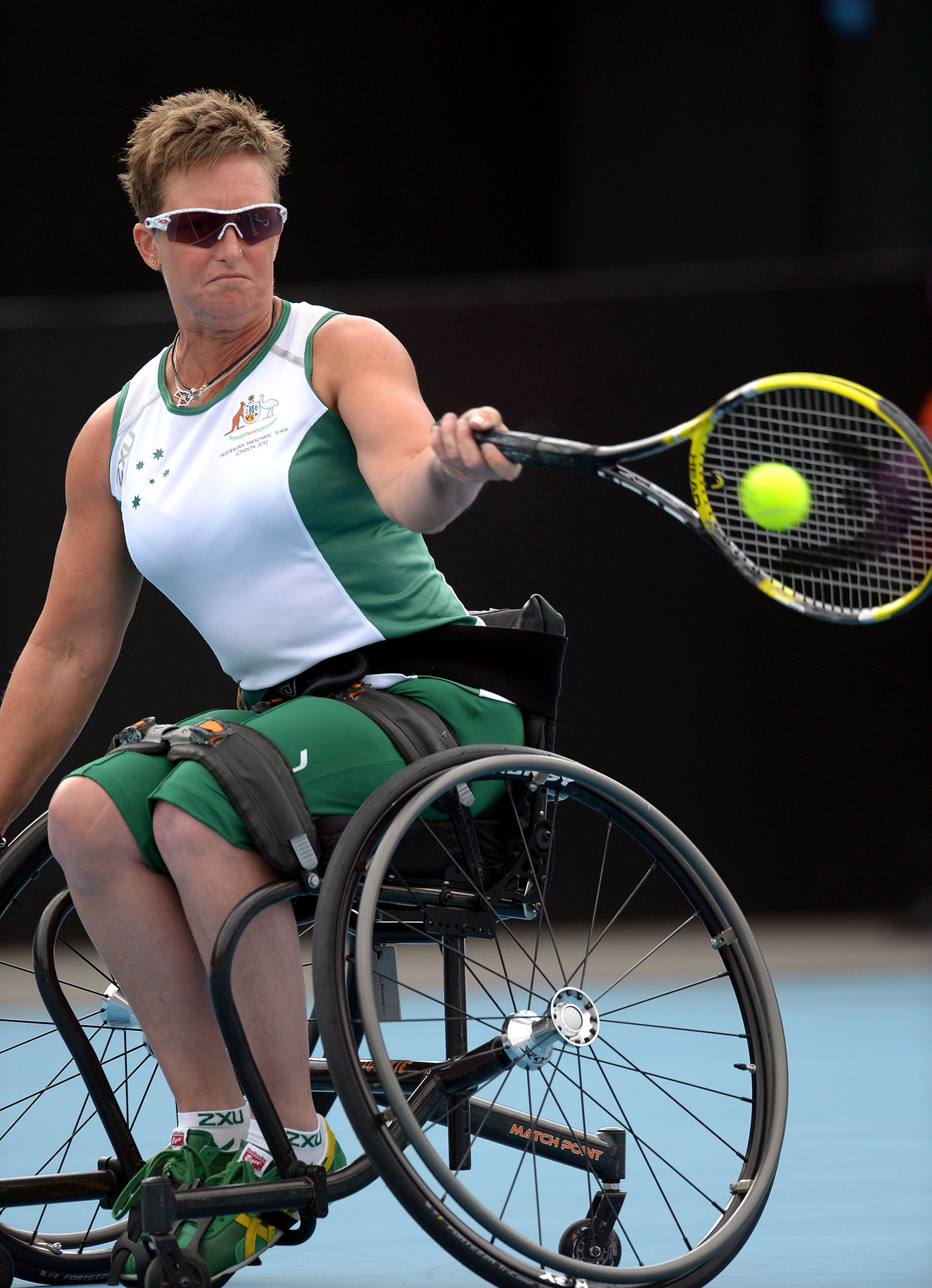
Manns at the 2012 London Paralympics

Manns won a bronze medal at the 2006 FESPIC Games in Kuala Lumpur, in her first appearance as a member of Australia's national team. She won three golds at the 2007 Arafura Games, in the mixed team, doubles and in the singles events. In 2010, she peaked in the rankings at seventeenth in the world in the singles event. Because of financial problems that prevented her from traveling, she was unable to compete for a while and her ranking fell to sixty-third in the world. In 2011, she played in several tournaments in South America, including competitions in Barranquilla, Santiago, Minas Gerais and Buenos Aires. In Minas Gerais and Buenos Aires, she made the finals in the women's wheelchair singles. In Barranquilla and Santiago, she made the semi-finals in the women's wheelchair singles. She won the women's wheelchair doubles event with Argentine partner Andrea Medrano in Santiago and Barranquilla. Following these events, she improved her world ranking to number thirty. By April 2011, she had been selected as a member of Australia's Shadow Paralympic Squad ahead of the 2012 Summer Paralympics.

Manns was selected to represent Australia at the 2012 Summer Paralympics in women's singles and women's doubles wheelchair tennis at what will be her first Paralympics. Her doubles partner will be Daniela Di Toro. Her first match is scheduled to start on 1 September.
