= Janel Jacobson =

- Born: 1950; Minneapolis, Minnesota
- Known for: Ceramic, woodworking
- Website: janeljacobson.com

Janel Jacobson (born 1950 in Minneapolis, Minnesota) is an American artist known for ceramics and woodcarving. She started her career carving porcelain and has since changed her medium to wood, most often boxwood. Her work is in the Philadelphia Museum of Art the Racine Art Museum, the Smithsonian American Art Museum (SAAM), and the Yale University Art Gallery. Several of her works were acquired by the SAAM as part of the Renwick Gallery's 50th Anniversary Campaign.
