= Janell Moon =

American writer

Janell Moon is an American author of spiritual non-fiction and poetry. In 2002, her book The Wise Earth Speaks to Your Spirit was voted one of the year's best spiritual books by Spirituality and Health magazine.

Her poetry awards include the National Main Street Rag Poetry Contest, The Stonewall Prize from the Chestnut Hills Press, the Salt Hill National Prize from Syracuse University in New York, the Whiskey Hill Award, the Georgia State University Randall Jared Award, the Billie Murray Denny Poetry Award, The Red Rock Review Prize, The Villa Montalvo Poetry Prize, the Gertrude Award, Comstock Poetry Award, and the Poet Lore Award.

She is also a hypnotherapist.

== Works ==
- Riding Free in a Blue Studebaker (2008)
- The Prayer Box: Create, Write and Live Your Prayers (2004)
- How to Pray Without Being Religious (2004)
- The Wise Earth Speaks to Your Spirit: 52 Ways to Find Your Soul Voice Through Journal Writing (2002)
- Stirring the Waters: Writing to Find Your Spirit (2001)
- The Mouth of Home (1999)
