= Janelle Billingslea =

American sprinter

Janelle A. Billingslea (born 1980s) is best known for setting a world record (junior) in the women's 500 m dash. She is currently working on her first book as well as an assortment of other projects.

== Early life and education ==
Billingslea was born in Washington, D.C., but relocated to Juneau, Alaska, at an early age. Billingslea attended Juneau Douglas High School (JDHS) and after winning numerous state championships in track and basketball relocated to Washington, D.C. focus on track. Billingslea won all four of her events during the outdoor season and was named Gatorade Player of the Year for Washington D.C. She graduated from Georgetown University with a degree in political science and psychology.

== Work ==
Although invited to train with the Nike Farm Team, Billingslea sustained a potential career-ending injury to her left Achilles tendon. As a result, her career in track and field was sidelined. After graduating, Billingslea landed a position with the United States Department of Defense that took her all over the world. Here she traveled and met with high-ranking US and foreign officials. Currently she is working on her first book, which was scheduled to be released in 2008. After recovering from her injury, she has decided to resume training for world championships and future Olympic Games.
