= Janele =

Janele is a given name and a surname. Notable people with the name include:

- Hannelore Janele (born 1943), Austrian swimmer
- Janele Hyer-Spencer (born 1964), American politician

== See also ==
- Janelle (disambiguation)
