= Mick Connell =

Australian wheelchair tennis player

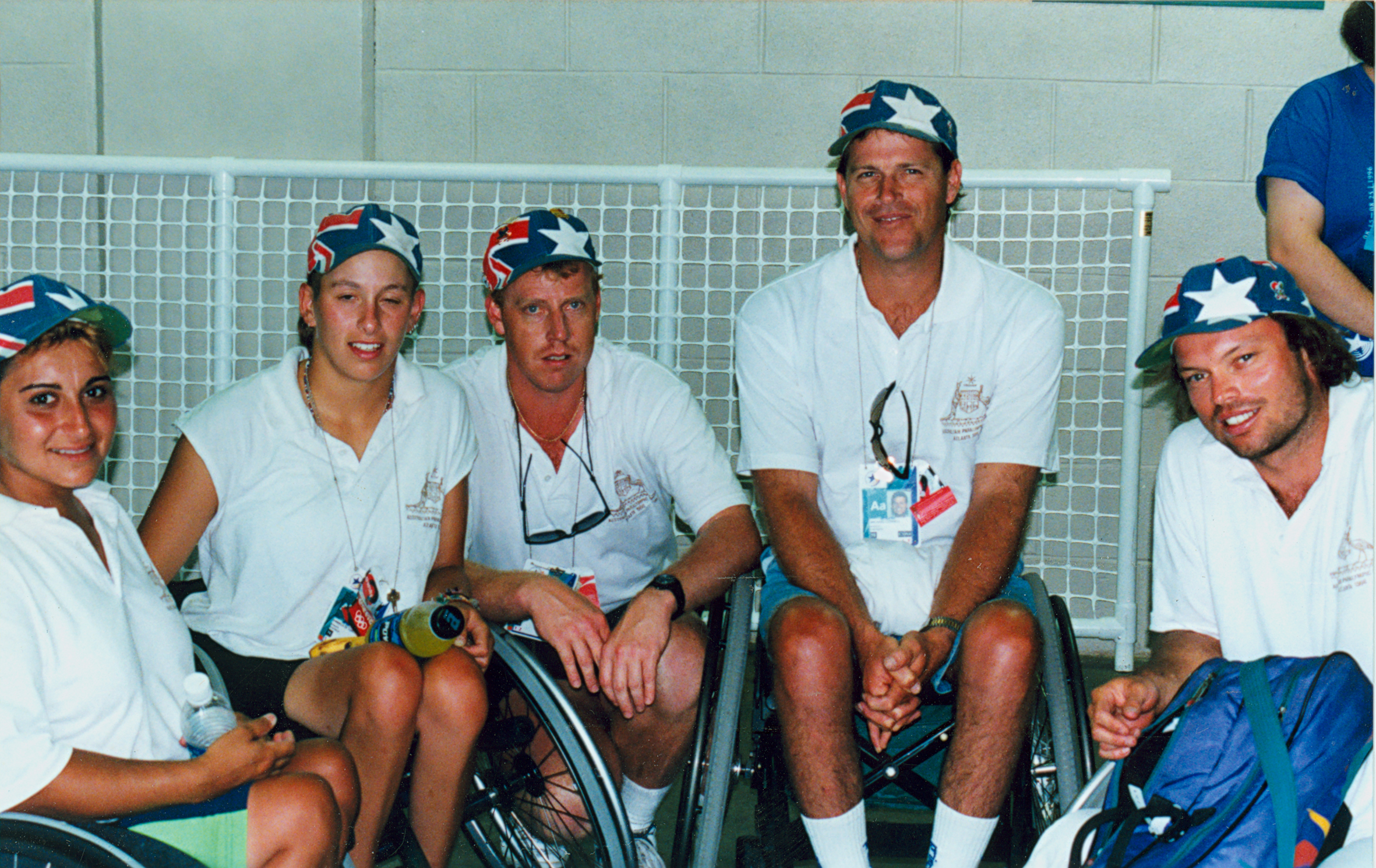
- Full name: Michael Connell
- Country (sports): Australia
- Born: 13 November 1961 (age 64) Liverpool, New South Wales
- Plays: Right Handed

Singles
- Highest ranking: No. 2 (2 February 1993)
- Current ranking: No. 175

Doubles
- Highest ranking: No. 1 (18 October 1994)
- Current ranking: No. 173

Grand Slam doubles results
- Australian Open: W (1996)
Medal record
Representing Australia
Men's wheelchair tennis
Paralympic Games
Silver medal – second place	1988 Seoul	Men's Singles "Demonstration event"
Silver medal – second place	1996 Atlanta	Men's Doubles
- Last updated on: 17 October 2012.

Michael "Mike" Connell (born 13 November 1961) is an Australian former wheelchair tennis player. He won a silver medal in the Men's Singles event at the 1988 Seoul Paralympics. He participated without winning any medals at the 1992 Barcelona Paralympics. In 1996, he won the men's doubles at the Australian Open with his partner, David Hall. At the 1996 Atlanta Paralympics, he won a silver medal in the Men's Doubles event with Hall.

Connell won three Australian Opens - 1989, 1991 and 1993). His other tournament victories included three Japan Opens (1986, 1987, 1989), two Swiss Opens (1988, 1992), three Austrian Opens (1988, 1991, 1993), two German Opens (1988, 1990), the 1988 French Open and the 1994 Belgian Open. In 1994, Connell and Hall won the World Team Cup, Australia's first win at this prestigious tournament.

Connell runs the "Wheelies" Wheelchair Tennis program and coaches Adam Kellerman. In 2014, Connell was still competing in major tournaments in Australia.
