= Janelle Kirtley =

American World Champion water skier (1943–2017)

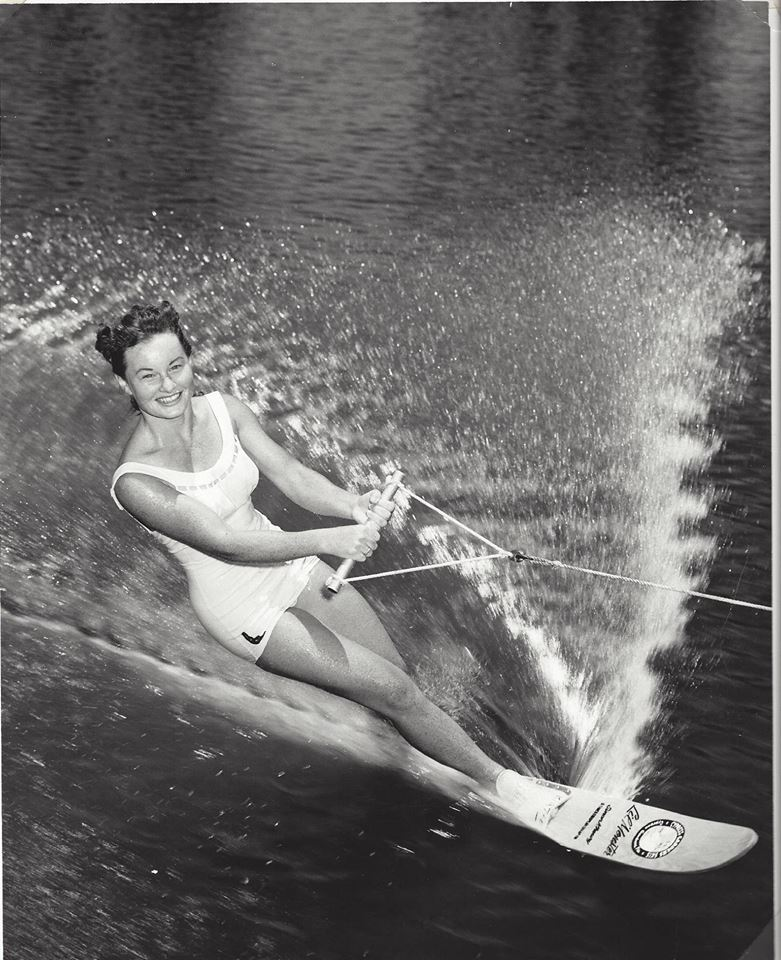
Janelle Kirtley Skiing at Cypress Gardens 1960

Janelle (Jane Ellen) Kirtley Godfrey (December 8, 1943 - April 28, 2017) was an American former World Champion water skier.

== Biography ==
Janelle was born on December 8, 1943, in Birmingham, Alabama to Robert H Kirtley and Mary Leona Perry Kirtley. With the strict guidance of her parents, she learned how to ski at age 5, and started competing in water skiing tournaments in 1956. In 1959, at the age of 15, she was on the U.S. Women's National Water Ski Team and competed in Milan, Italy in 1959. In 1960 she won overall in the Masters Water Ski Tournament, and she went on to win the World Championship in the 1961 World Tournament Women's Slalom Title and the 1963 Tricks and Slalom. She obtained several Water Skiing National Titles. In 1961 she enrolled in the School of Nursing at St. Vincent's in Birmingham and then graduated in 1964. In 2001 she was recognized with the Award of Distinction from the Water Ski Hall of Fame, and she was inducted into the Alabama Sports Hall of Fame in 2009.

== Personal life ==
In 1965, Janelle married Roland LeGrand Godfrey, of Adamsville Alabama, and raised three sons in Forestdale and Adamsville Alabama. Janelle has eight grandchildren and two great-grandchildren. Her family continued the water skiing tradition and continue to ski in the waters she practiced in on the Black Warrior River in Alabama. One of her most famous sayings to her family of water skiers is "If you ain't falling you ain't trying". And she would put this saying into practice in her daily life as viewed in this footage of Janelle trick skiing in Cypress Gardens, FL between the years 1958 and 1960.

== Filmography ==
- Stay Hungry

== Tournament results ==
- 1956 Overall, Slalom, and Tricks National Champion (La Porte, Indiana), Girls Division
- 1957 Slalom National Champion (San Diego, CA), Girls Division
- 1959 1st Slalom, 2nd Overall, Jr Dixie Tournament (The Water Skier Magazine Results), Cypress Gardens, Florida, Girls Division
- 1959 Tricks and Overall, IDA Cason Callaway Gardens Invitational, Pine Mointain, Georgia, Girls Division
- 1959 Slalom and Tricks National Champion and Second Overall (Laconia, New Hampshire), Girls Division
- 1960 Overall and Slalom National Champion (Minneapolis, MN), Girls Division
- 1960 Overall Masters Water Ski Tournament Women Division
- 1961 Overall and Tricks National Champion (Austin, Texas), Women Division The Water Skier Magazine 1961
- 1961 World Water Skiing Champions Women Slalom and Women Overall
- 1963 Slalom and Tricks National Champion (Long Beach, California), Women Division
- 1964 Slalom National Champion (Webster, Massachusetts), Women Division
- 1964 Slalom Masters Water Ski Tournament Women Division
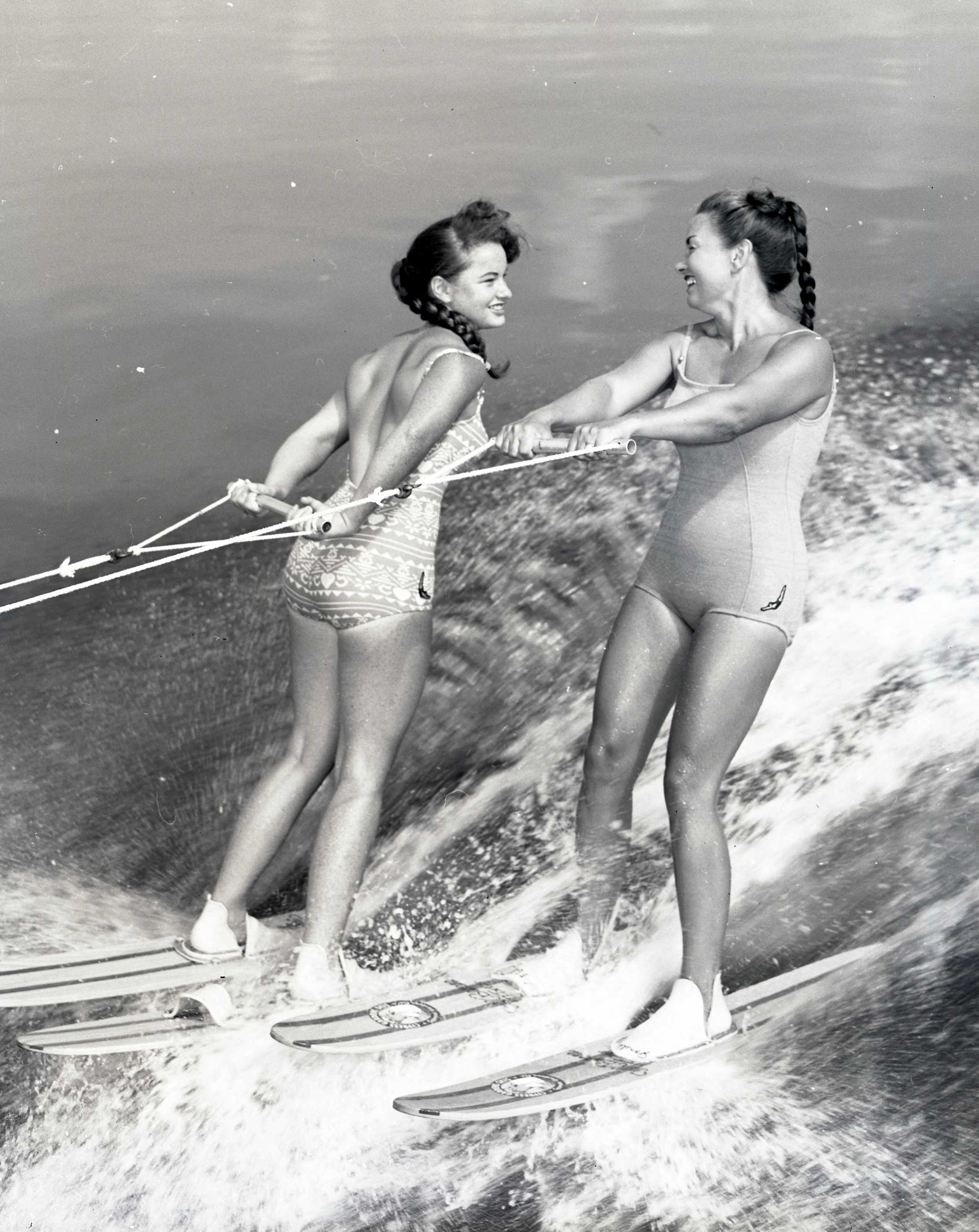
Janelle (Daughter) and Leona Kirtley (Mother) Doubles Front to Back Facing (1962)

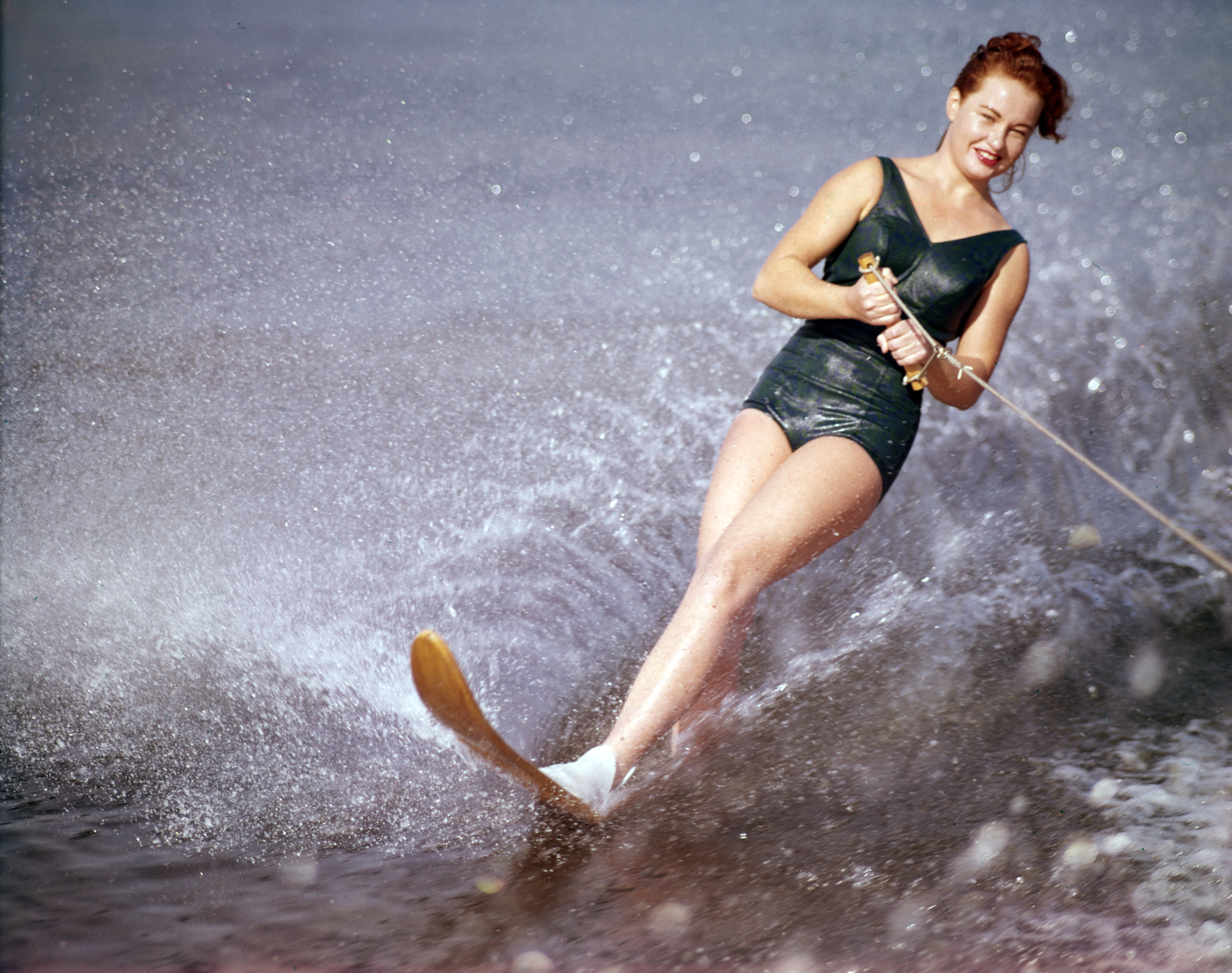
Janelle Kirtley Cypress Gardens (1960)

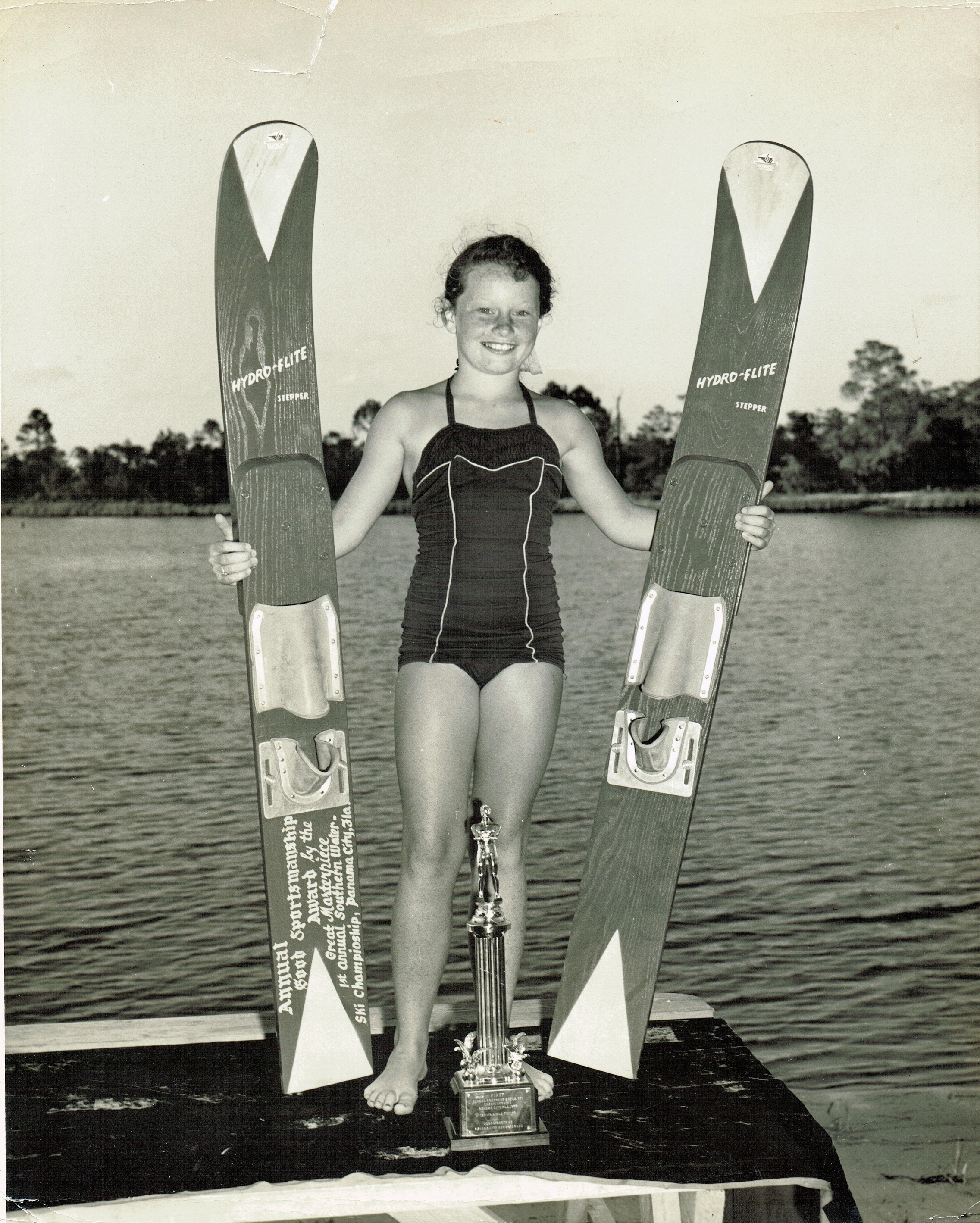
Janelle Kirtley receives a sportsmanship award at 12 years old. (1955)

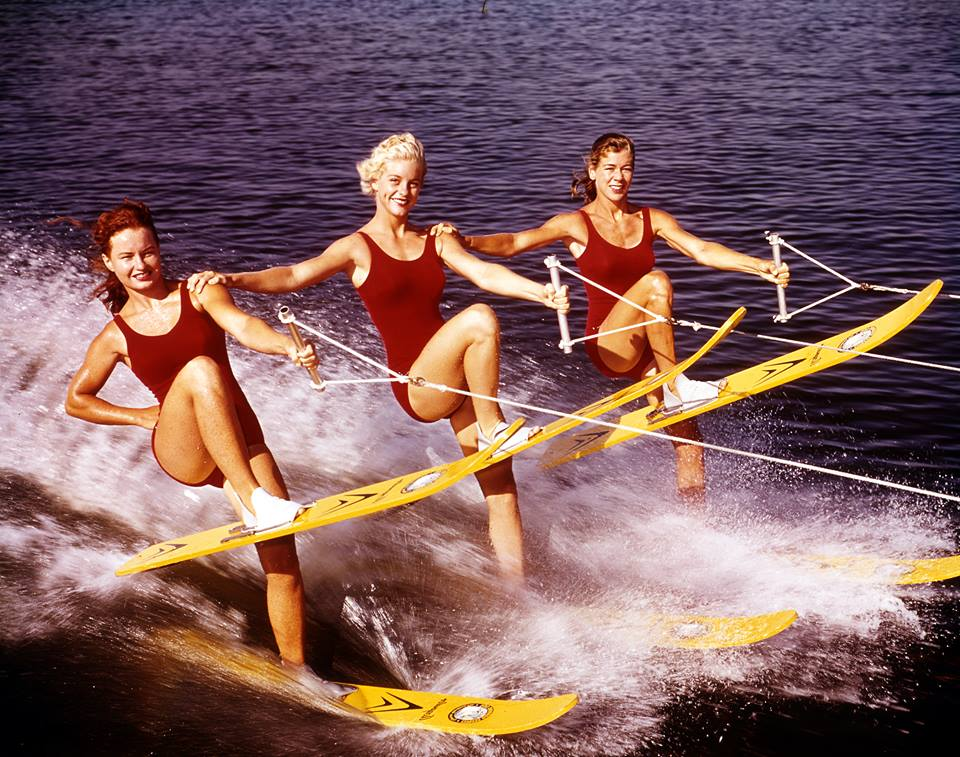
Janelle Kirtley Skiing at Cypress Gardens (August, 1960)

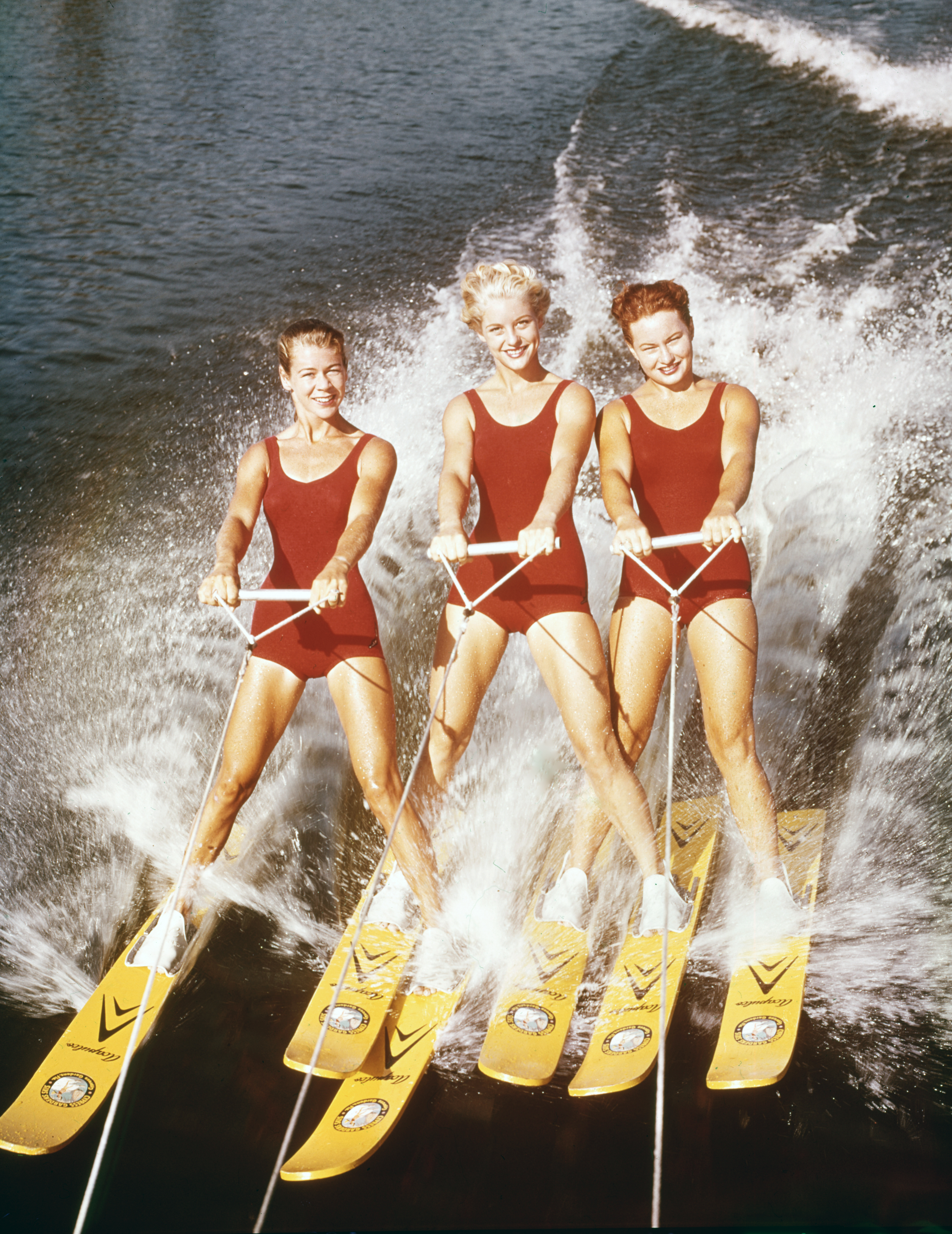
Judy Rosch, Barbara Cooper Clack, Janelle Kirtley (1961)

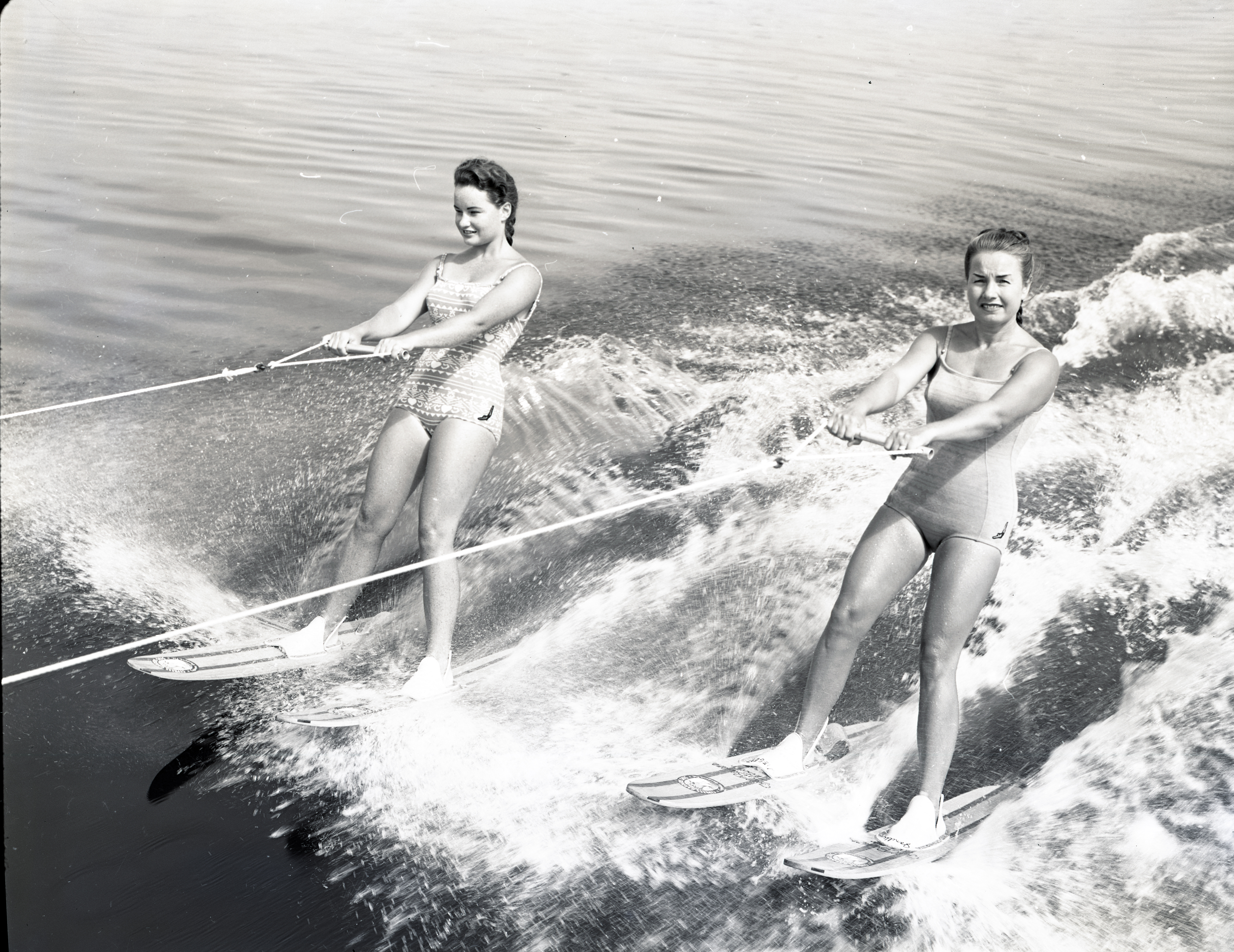
Janelle (Daughter) and Leona Kirtley (Mother) Doubles Both Front Facing (1962)

Janelle Kirtley Masters Water Ski Tournament ABC Wide World of Sports (1962)

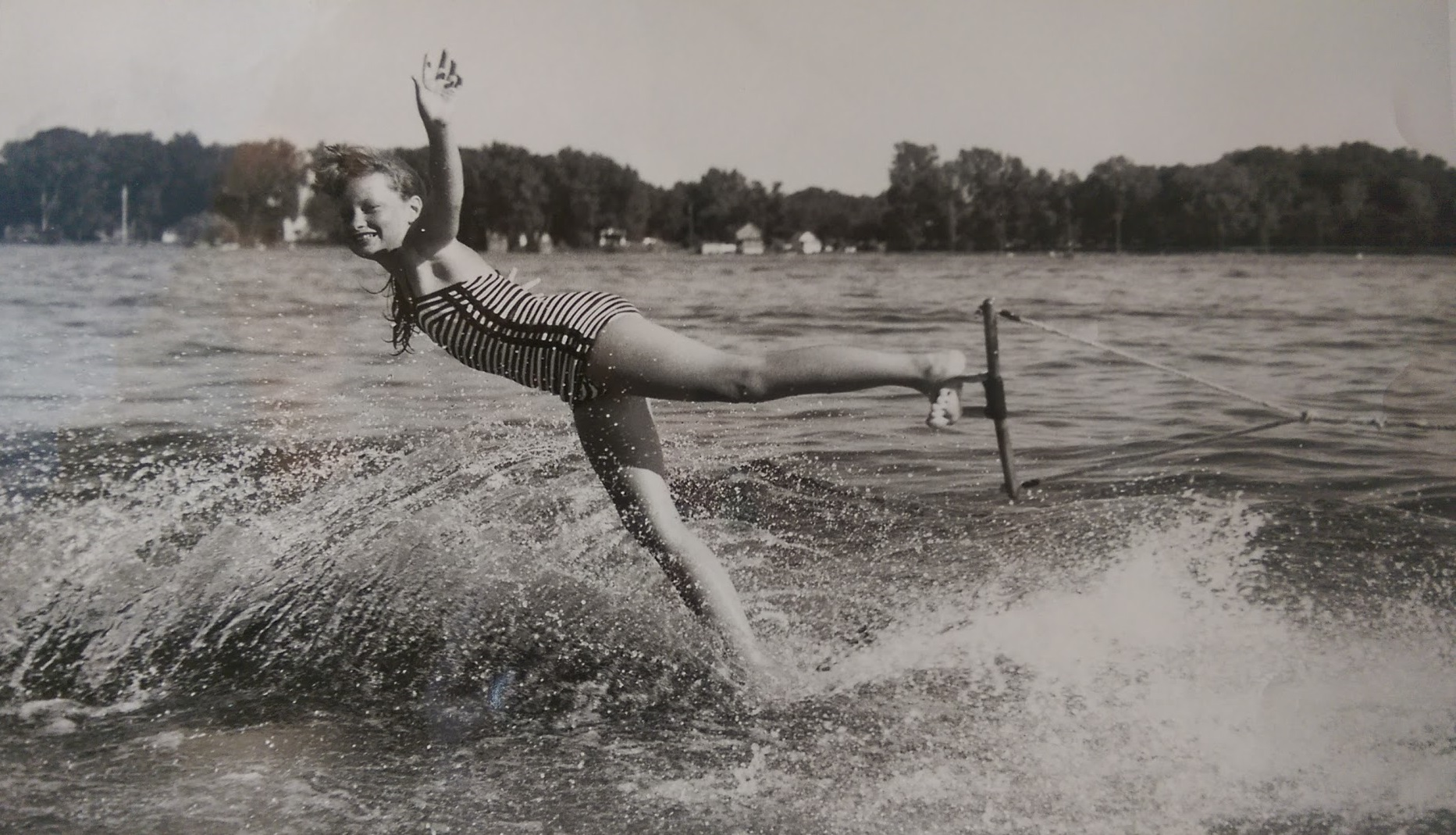
Janelle Kirtley ToeHold Janelle Kirtley Practicing Toehold at 13 Years old (1956)
