= Greg Crump =

Australian wheelchair tennis coach

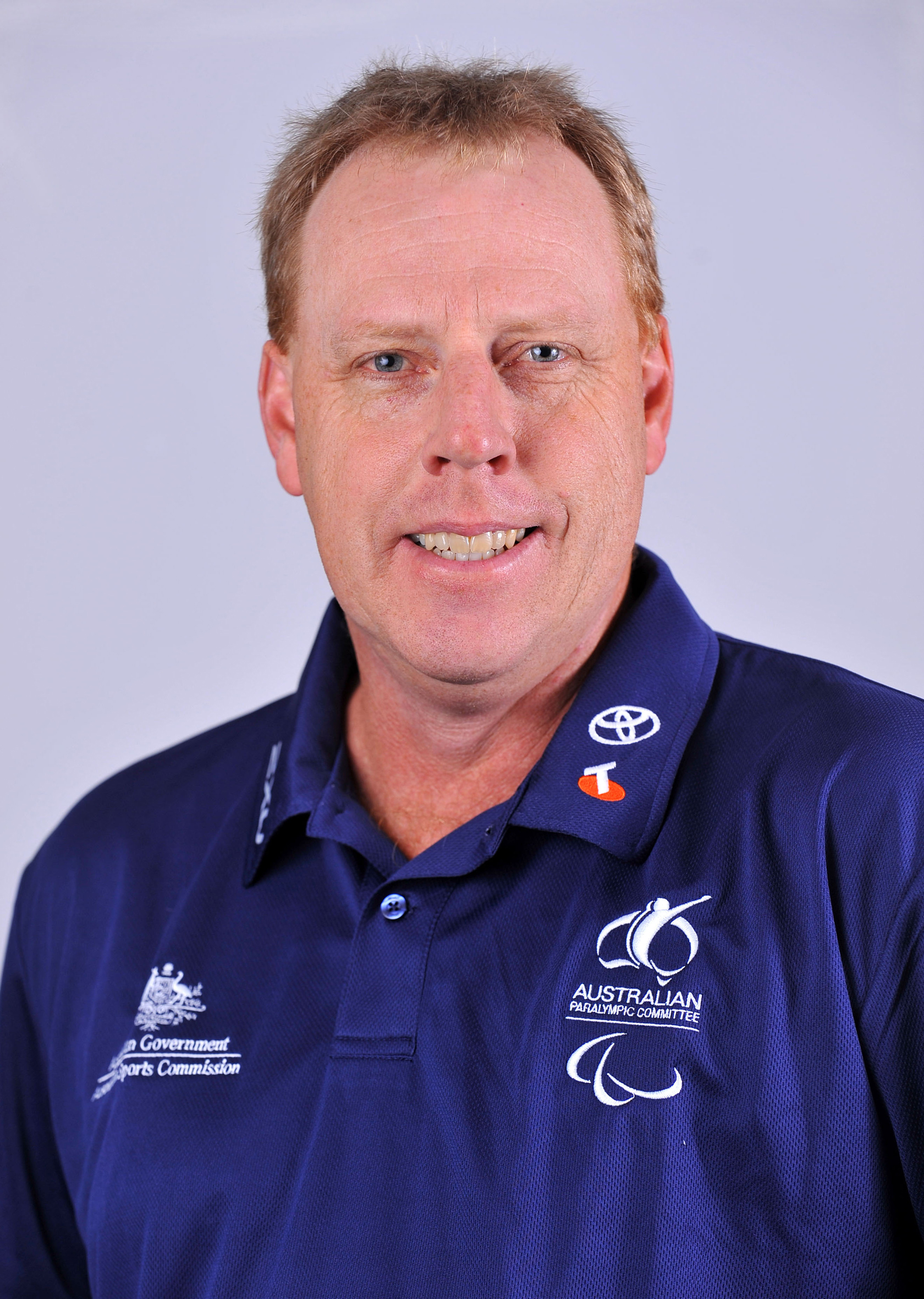
- 2012 Australian Paralympic Team portrait of Crump

Personal information
- Nationality: Australian
- Born: Wangaratta

Sport
- Country: Australia
- Sport: Wheelchair Tennis
- Now coaching: Australian National Wheelchair Tennis Team

Greg Crump is an Australian wheelchair tennis coach. He was selected to coach Australia at the 2012 Summer Paralympics in the wheelchair tennis.

== Wheelchair tennis ==
Crump began coaching wheelchair tennis in the late 1980s. One of the first competitors he coached was Daniela Di Toro, who took up the sport when she was thirteen years old at Crump's suggestion. He was the coach of the Australian national team in 2008. At the 2008 Summer Paralympics, he coached Daniela Di Toro. He was the coach of the Australian national team in 2009. He encouraged Australian wheelchair basketball player Melanie Hall to make the switch from that sport to wheelchair tennis following the 2008 Summer Paralympics. He was the coach of the Australian national team in 2010. Players he worked with in 2010 included Henry De Cure, Keegan Oh-Chee, Stephan Rochecouste and Anderson Parker. In August 2010, he ran a wheelchair tennis coaching clinic in Vanuatu. It was the first clinic of its kind to be held in the country. He was the coach for the Australian national team again in 2011. As a coach of the national that year, he coached Keegan Oh-Chee at an event. He coached the national team at a World Cup event played at the University of Pretoria in South Africa in 2011. In 2011, he hosted a clinic at the Broadview Tennis Club in Adelaide, South Australia that was made possible by the ITF wheel-chair Tennis Department. Players from around the region attended the clinic he hosted, including one from Sri Lanka. He was the Australian national team coach in 2012. He supported the creation of the 2012 Australian Wheelchair Tennis Tour. In 2012, he was coaching Luba Josevski, Michael Dobbie, Matthew Ingram He was selected to coach Australia at the 2012 Summer Paralympics in the wheelchair tennis.
