= List of U.S. states and territories by elevation =

Elevation extremes of United States by state, district, and territory

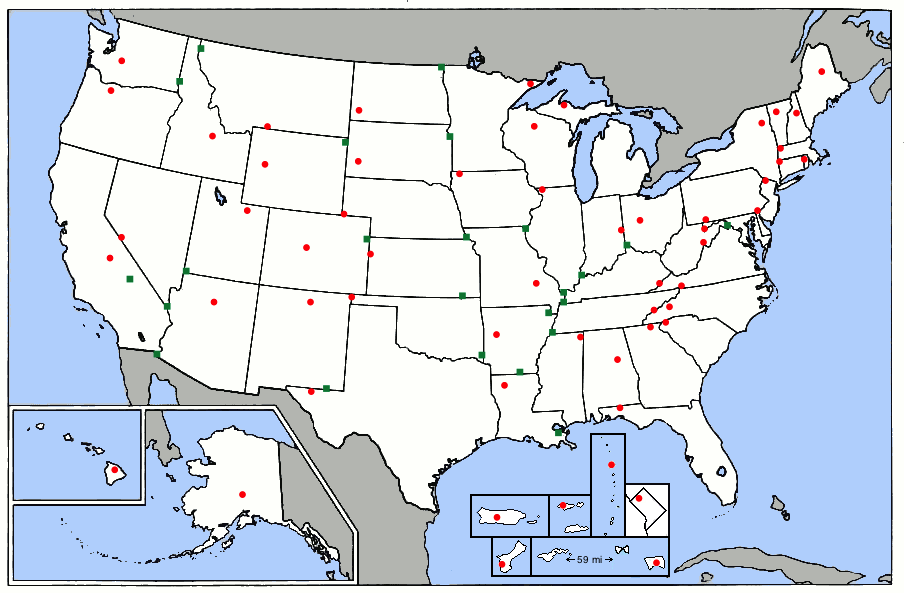
Enlargeable U.S. map with state and territory high points shown as red dots and low points as green squares except where low point is a shoreline.

Enlargeable map of the 50 U.S. states by mean elevation.

This list includes the topographic elevations of each of the 50 U.S. states, the District of Columbia, and the U.S. territories.

The elevation of a geographic area may be stated in several ways. These include:

1. The maximum elevation of the area (high point); (Note: A high point may be (1.) a topographic summit, or (2.) a point on a border.)
2. The minimum elevation of the area (low point); (Note: A low point may be (1.) the border crossing of a gulch, stream, or river; or (2.) the shore of a reservoir, lake, or ocean; or (3.) the bottom of an endorheic basin. The elevation of a stream, river, reservoir, or lake will vary seasonally. The bottom of an endorheic basin may fill with water.)
3. The arithmetic mean elevation of the area (statistical mean elevation); (Note: The mean elevation of an area is the arithmetic average of all point elevations in the area.)
4. The median elevation of the area (statistical 50% elevation); (Note: The median elevation of an area is the median of all point elevations in the area.) and
5. The elevation range of the area. (Note: The elevation range of an area is the maximum elevation minus the minimum elevation.)

All topographic elevations are adjusted to the North American Vertical Datum of 1988 (NAVD 88). All geographic coordinates are adjusted to the World Geodetic System of 1984 (WGS 84). The mean elevation for each state, the District of Columbia, and Puerto Rico is accurate to the nearest 100 feet (30 m). Mean elevation data is not available for the other U.S. territories.

== Cultural significance ==
Those who try to summit the highest point in each U.S. state and territory are known as highpointers.

== Elevations ==
Elevations of the 50 U.S. states, the District of Columbia, and the U.S. territories
State, district, or territory	Highest point, rank & elevation			Lowest point, rank & elevation			Elevation: rank, mean; rank, range				High point coordinates (Note: Coordinates are adjusted to the World Geodetic System of 1984 (WGS 84).)
Alabama	Cheaha Mountain	38	2,405 ft 733 m	Gulf of Mexico	3	sea level	41	500 ft 150 m	38	2,405 ft 733 m	33°29′07″N 85°48′31″W
Alaska (Note: Alaska has the highest point in North America and the greatest elevation range of any U.S. state.)	Mount McKinley (Denali) (Note: The summit of Denali is the highest point in the United States and all of North America. Federally designated as Mount McKinley, Denali is both the third most topographically prominent summit and the third most topographically isolated summit on Earth. Denali is the highest point in the entire Arctic Ocean Basin.)	1	20,310 ft 6190.5 m	Gulf of Alaska, Bering Sea, and Arctic Ocean	3	sea level	15	1,900 ft 580 m	1	20,310 ft 6190.5 m	63°04′08″N 151°00′23″W
American Samoa	Lata Mountain on Taʻū Island	36	3,169 ft 966 m	Pacific Ocean	3	sea level	N/A		35	3,169 ft 966 m	14°13′59″S 169°27′15″W
Arizona	Humphreys Peak	12	12,637 ft 3851.8 m	Colorado River at Mexico border	33	70 ft 21 m	7	4,100 ft 1250 m	6	12,567 ft 3830 m	35°20′47″N 111°40′41″W
Arkansas	Mount Magazine (Note: Mount Magazine is the highest summit of the Ozarks.)	37	2,753 ft 839 m	Ouachita River at Louisiana border	32	55 ft 17 m	37	650 ft 200 m	37	2,698 ft 822 m	35°10′02″N 93°38′41″W
California (Note: California has the lowest point in North America. California also has the highest point and greatest elevation range of any U.S. state except Alaska.)	Mount Whitney (Note: Mount Whitney is the highest summit of the Sierra Nevada. Mount Whitney is the highest point of both the San Joaquin Basin and the Great Basin.)	2	14,505 ft 4421.0 m	Badwater Basin in Death Valley (Note: The Badwater Basin, an endorheic basin in Death Valley, is the lowest point in the United States and all of North America. The Salton Sea, an endorheic basin with the lowest water level in North America, is currently near the −239.6-foot (−73.0 m) level.)	1	−285 ft −87 m	11	2,900 ft 880 m	2	14,787 ft 4507 m	36°34′43″N 118°17′33″W
Colorado (Note: Colorado has the highest mean elevation and the highest low point of any U.S. state.)	Mount Elbert (Note: Mount Elbert is the highest summit of the Rocky Mountains of the United States and Canada. Mount Elbert is the highest point in the Mississippi River Basin.)	3	14,440 ft 4401.2 m	Arikaree River at Kansas border (Note: The point where the Arikaree River flows out of Colorado and into Kansas is the highest low point of any U.S. state, higher than the high points of 18 states and the District of Columbia.)	57	3,317 ft 1011 m	1	6,800 ft 2070 m	10	11,123 ft 3390 m	39°07′04″N 106°26′43″W
Connecticut	Southern slope of Mount Frissell at Massachusetts border (Note: Connecticut is the only U.S. state with a high point that is not a topographic summit, although several other high points have a topographic prominence of less than 50 feet (15 m). The highest summit in Connecticut is Bear Mountain, approximately 1.45 miles (2.33 km) south-southeast; its exact elevation is disputed, but it is at least 60 feet (18 m) lower than the highest point on Mount Frissell in Connecticut.)	39	2,386 ft 727 m	Long Island Sound	3	sea level	41	500 ft 150 m	39	2,386 ft 727 m	42°02′59″N 73°28′58″W
Delaware (Note: Delaware has the lowest mean elevation of any U.S. state or the District of Columbia.)	Near the Ebright Azimuth	54	449 ft 137 m	Atlantic Ocean	3	sea level	52	60 ft 20 m	54	449 ft 137 m	39°50′10″N 75°31′20″W
District of Columbia	Point Reno	55	414 ft 126 m	Potomac River at eastern Maryland border	31	1 ft 0.3 m	49	150 ft 50 m	55	413 ft 126 m	38°57′06″N 77°04′34″W
Florida (Note: Florida has the lowest high point and the smallest elevation range of any U.S. state or the District of Columbia.)	Britton Hill (Note: Britton Hill is the lowest high point of any U.S. state or the District of Columbia.)	56	345 ft 105 m	Atlantic Ocean and Gulf of Mexico	3	sea level	50	100 ft 30 m	56	345 ft 105 m	30°59′05″N 86°16′57″W
(Georgia (U.S. state)) Georgia	Brasstown Bald	25	4,784 ft 1458 m	Atlantic Ocean	3	sea level	38	600 ft 180 m	22	4,784 ft 1458 m	34°52′28″N 83°48′40″W
Guam	Mount Lamlam (Note: Although only 1,332 feet (406 m) above sea level, the summit of Mount Lamlam is 195 miles (314 km) northeast and 37,160 feet (11,330 m) above the Challenger Deep.)	48	1,332 ft 406 m	Pacific Ocean	3	sea level	N/A		46	1,332 ft 406 m	13°20′23″N 144°39′56″E
Hawaii	Mauna Kea (Note: Mauna Kea is the highest summit of the island of Hawaiʻi and the entire North Pacific Ocean. Hawaiʻi is second only to New Guinea as the tallest island on Earth. Mauna Kea is the tallest mountain on Earth if measured from its base at −19,684 feet (−6,000 m) below the surface of the Pacific Ocean to its summit at 13,796 feet (4,205 m) for a total rise of 33,480 feet (10,205 m). Neighboring Mauna Loa is the most voluminous mountain on Earth.)	6	13,803 ft 4207.3 m	Pacific Ocean	3	sea level	10	3,030 ft 920 m	4	13,803 ft 4207 m	19°49′15″N 155°28′05″W
Idaho	Borah Peak	11	12,668 ft 3861.2 m	Confluence of Snake and Clearwater rivers	49	710 ft 216 m	6	5,000 ft 1520 m	7	11,958 ft 3645 m	44°08′15″N 113°46′52″W
Illinois	Charles Mound (Note: Charles Mound is approximately 1,300 feet (400 m) south of the Wisconsin border.)	50	1,235 ft 376.4 m	Confluence of Mississippi and Ohio rivers	39	279 ft 85 m	38	600 ft 180 m	49	956 ft 291 m	42°30′15″N 90°14′23″W
Indiana	Hoosier Hill	49	1,257 ft 383 m	Confluence of Wabash and Ohio rivers	41	320 ft 98 m	34	795 ft 242 m	50	937 ft 286 m	40°00′04″N 84°50′55″W
Iowa	Hawkeye Point	45	1,671 ft 509 m	Confluence of Mississippi and Des Moines rivers	44	480 ft 146 m	22	1,100 ft 340 m	47	1,191 ft 363 m	43°27′37″N 95°42′32″W
Kansas	Mount Sunflower (Note: Mount Sunflower is approximately 2,630 feet (800 m) east of the Colorado border.)	29	4,041 ft 1232 m	Verdigris River at Oklahoma border	48	679 ft 207 m	14	2,000 ft 610 m	32	3,362 ft 1025 m	39°01′19″N 102°02′14″W
Kentucky	Black Mountain	28	4,139 ft 1262 m	Mississippi River at Kentucky Bend	38	257 ft 78 m	35	750 ft 230 m	28	3,882 ft 1183 m	36°54′51″N 82°53′38″W
Louisiana (Note: Louisiana is the only U.S. region with land below sea level outside of California.)	Driskill Mountain	53	535 ft 163 m	New Orleans	2	−8 ft −2.4 m	50	100 ft 30 m	53	543 ft 166 m	32°25′30″N 92°53′48″W
Maine	Mount Katahdin (Note: Mount Katahdin is the highest summit of the Longfellow Mountains.)	22	5,270 ft 1606.4 m	Atlantic Ocean	3	sea level	38	600 ft 180 m	21	5,270 ft 1606 m	45°54′16″N 68°55′17″W
Maryland	Hoye-Crest	33	3,370 ft 1027 m	Atlantic Ocean	3	sea level	44	350 ft 110 m	31	3,370 ft 1027 m	39°14′15″N 79°29′08″W
Massachusetts	Mount Greylock (Note: Mount Greylock is the highest summit of the Berkshires.)	32	3,489 ft 1063 m	Atlantic Ocean	3	sea level	41	500 ft 150 m	30	3,489 ft 1063 m	42°38′14″N 73°09′57″W
Michigan	Mount Arvon (Note: The summit of Mount Arvon is the highest point on the Upper Peninsula of Michigan.)	41	1,979 ft 603 m	Lake Erie	45	571 ft 174 m	29	900 ft 270 m	44	1,408 ft 429 m	46°45′21″N 88°09′19″W
Minnesota	Eagle Mountain	40	2,302 ft 702 m	Lake Superior	47	601 ft 183 m	21	1,200 ft 370 m	41	1,701 ft 518 m	47°53′51″N 90°33′38″W
Mississippi	Woodall Mountain	52	807 ft 246.0 m	Gulf of Mexico	3	sea level	46	300 ft 90 m	52	807 ft 246 m	34°47′16″N 88°14′30″W
Missouri	Taum Sauk Mountain (Note: Taum Sauk Mountain is the highest summit of the St. Francois Mountains.)	44	1,772 ft 540 m	Saint Francis River at southern Arkansas border	36	230 ft 70 m	33	800 ft 240 m	43	1,542 ft 470 m	37°34′17″N 90°43′45″W
Montana	Granite Peak (Note: Granite Peak is the highest summit of the Beartooth Mountains.)	10	12,807 ft 3903.5 m	Kootenai River at Idaho border	53	1,800 ft 549 m	8	3,400 ft 1040 m	11	11,007 ft 3355 m	45°09′49″N 109°48′27″W
Nebraska	Panorama Point (Note: Panorama Point is approximately 2,210 feet (670 m) north of the Colorado border.)	20	5,432 ft 1656 m	Missouri River at Kansas border	51	840 ft 256 m	12	2,600 ft 790 m	25	4,592 ft 1400 m	41°00′28″N 104°01′53″W
Nevada	Boundary Peak (Note: The summit of Boundary Peak is approximately 1,440 feet (440 m) northeast of the California border.)	9	13,147 ft 4007 m	Colorado River at California border	43	479 ft 146 m	5	5,500 ft 1680 m	5	12,668 ft 3861 m	37°50′46″N 118°21′05″W
New Hampshire	Mount Washington (Note: Mount Washington is the highest summit of the White Mountains. The summit of Mount Washington is the highest point on the northeastern Northern American continent.)	18	6,285.8 ft 1915.92 m	Atlantic Ocean (Gulf of Maine)	3	sea level	25	1,000 ft 300 m	17	6,286 ft 1916 m	44°16′14″N 71°18′12″W
New Jersey	High Point	43	1,802 ft 549 m	Atlantic Ocean	3	sea level	47	250 ft 80 m	40	1,802 ft 549 m	41°19′15″N 74°39′42″W
New Mexico	Wheeler Peak (Note: Wheeler Peak is the highest summit of the Taos Mountains.)	8	13,167 ft 4013.3 m	Red Bluff Reservoir on Texas border	55	2,842 ft 866 m	4	5,700 ft 1740 m	13	10,325 ft 3147 m	36°33′24″N 105°25′01″W
New York	Mount Marcy (Note: Mount Marcy is the highest summit of the Adirondack Mountains.)	21	5,343 ft 1628.57 m	Atlantic Ocean	3	sea level	25	1,000 ft 300 m	20	5,343 ft 1629 m	44°06′46″N 73°55′26″W
North Carolina	Mount Mitchell (Note: Mount Mitchell is the highest summit of the Appalachian Mountains. The summit of Mount Mitchell is the highest point on the eastern Northern American continent.)	16	6,684 ft 2037 m	Atlantic Ocean	3	sea level	36	700 ft 210 m	15	6,684 ft 2037 m	35°45′54″N 82°15′54″W
North Dakota	White Butte	31	3,506 ft 1069 m	Red River of the North at Manitoba border	50	750 ft 229 m	15	1,900 ft 580 m	36	2,756 ft 840 m	46°23′13″N 103°18′10″W
Northern Marianas	Mount Agrihan on the island of Agrihan (Note: The summit of Mount Agrihan is the highest point in the Northern Mariana Islands and all of Micronesia.)	35	3,204 ft 977 m	Pacific Ocean	3	sea level	N/A		34	3,204 ft 977 m	18°46′05″N 145°40′24″E
Ohio	Campbell Hill	47	1,548 ft 472 m	Ohio River at Indiana border	42	455 ft 139 m	32	850 ft 260 m	48	1,093 ft 333 m	40°22′13″N 83°43′12″W
Oklahoma	Black Mesa	23	4,975 ft 1516 m	Little River at Arkansas border	40	289 ft 88 m	20	1,300 ft 400 m	23	4,686 ft 1428 m	36°55′54″N 102°59′52″W
Oregon	Mount Hood (Note: Mount Hood is the highest summit of the Oregon Cascades.)	13	11,249 ft 3428.8 m	Pacific Ocean	3	sea level	9	3,300 ft 1010 m	9	11,249 ft 3429 m	45°22′25″N 121°41′46″W
Pennsylvania	Mount Davis	34	3,213 ft 979 m	Delaware River at Delaware border	3	sea level	22	1,100 ft 340 m	33	3,213 ft 979 m	39°47′10″N 79°10′36″W
Puerto Rico (Note: Puerto Rico has the highest point and greatest elevation range of any of the U.S. territories.)	Cerro de Punta (Note: Cerro de Punta is the highest point in any of the U.S. territories.)	27	4,390 ft 1338 m	Atlantic Ocean (Caribbean Sea)	3	sea level	31	856 ft 261 m	26	4,390 ft 1338 m	18°10′20″N 66°35′30″W
Rhode Island	Jerimoth Hill	51	811 ft 247 m	Atlantic Ocean	3	sea level	48	200 ft 60 m	51	811 ft 247 m	41°50′57″N 71°46′44″W
South Carolina	Sassafras Mountain	30	3,554 ft 1083 m	Atlantic Ocean	3	sea level	44	350 ft 110 m	29	3,554 ft 1083 m	35°03′54″N 82°46′38″W
South Dakota	Black Elk Peak (Note: Black Elk Peak is the highest summit of the Black Hills.)	15	7,244 ft 2208 m	Big Stone Lake on Minnesota border	52	966 ft 294 m	13	2,200 ft 670 m	18	6,278 ft 1914 m	43°51′58″N 103°31′52″W
Tennessee	Kuwohi (formerly Clingmans Dome) (Note: Kuwohi is the highest summit of the Great Smoky Mountains.)	17	6,643 ft 2025 m	Mississippi River at Mississippi border	35	178 ft 54 m	29	900 ft 270 m	16	6,465 ft 1971 m	35°33′46″N 83°29′55″W
Texas	Guadalupe Peak (Note: Guadalupe Peak is the highest summit of the Guadalupe Mountains.)	14	8,751 ft 2667.4 m	Gulf of Mexico	3	sea level	17	1,700 ft 520 m	14	8,751 ft 2667 m	31°53′29″N 104°51′39″W
Utah	Kings Peak (Note: Kings Peak is the highest summit of the Uinta Mountains and the Western Rocky Mountains.)	7	13,534 ft 4125 m	Beaver Dam Wash at Arizona border	54	2,180 ft 664 m	3	6,100 ft 1860 m	8	11,354 ft 3461 m	40°46′35″N 110°22′22″W
Vermont	Mount Mansfield (Note: Mount Mansfield is the highest summit of the Green Mountains.)	26	4,395.3 ft 1339.69 m	Lake Champlain	34	95 ft 29 m	25	1,000 ft 300 m	27	4,300 ft 1311 m	44°32′38″N 72°48′52″W
(United States Virgin Islands) Virgin Islands	Crown Mountain on the island of Saint Thomas	46	1,556 ft 474 m	Atlantic Ocean (Caribbean Sea)	3	sea level	N/A		42	1,556 ft 474 m	18°21′26″N 64°58′24″W
Virginia	Mount Rogers	19	5,711 ft 1740.6 m	Atlantic Ocean	3	sea level	28	950 ft 290 m	19	5,711 ft 1741 m	36°39′36″N 81°32′42″W
(Washington (state)) Washington	Mount Rainier (Note: Mount Rainier is the highest summit of the Cascade Range of the United States and Canada.)	4	14,400 ft 4389 m	Pacific Ocean	3	sea level	17	1,700 ft 520 m	3	14,400 ft 4389 m	46°51′10″N 121°45′37″W
West Virginia	Spruce Knob	24	4,862 ft 1482 m	Potomac River at Virginia border	37	240 ft 73 m	19	1,500 ft 460 m	24	4,622 ft 1409 m	38°41′59″N 79°31′59″W
Wisconsin	Timms Hill	42	1,951 ft 595 m	Lake Michigan	46	579 ft 176 m	24	1,050 ft 320 m	45	1,372 ft 418 m	45°27′03″N 90°11′43″W
Wyoming	Gannett Peak (Note: Gannett Peak is the highest summit of the Wind River Range and the Central Rocky Mountains. Gannett Peak is the highest point in the Green River Basin.)	5	13,809 ft 4209.1 m	Belle Fourche River at South Dakota border	56	3,101 ft 945 m	2	6,700 ft 2040 m	12	10,709 ft 3264 m	43°11′04″N 109°39′15″W
(United States) Outlying islands	Navassa Island high point	57	280 ft 85 m	Navassa Island in the Caribbean Sea and other islands in the Pacific Ocean	3	sea level	N/A		57	280 ft 85 m	18°23′48″N 75°00′45″W

=== Minor outlying islands ===
The highest points in the U.S. minor outlying islands, mostly unnamed:

- Baker Island high point – 26 feet (8 m)
- Howland Island high point – 10 feet (3 m)
- Jarvis Island high point – 23 feet (7 m)
- Johnston Atoll, Sand Island high point – 33 feet (10 m)
- Kingman Reef high point – less than 7 feet (2 m)
- Midway Atoll, Sand Island high point – 50 feet (15 m) – The highest point of the U.S. minor outlying islands in the Pacific Ocean.
- Navassa Island high point – 280 feet (85 m) – The highest point of all the U.S. minor outlying islands.
- Palmyra Atoll high point – 10 feet (3 m)
- Wake Island high point – 26 feet (8 m)

== Highpoint gallery (in order of elevation) ==
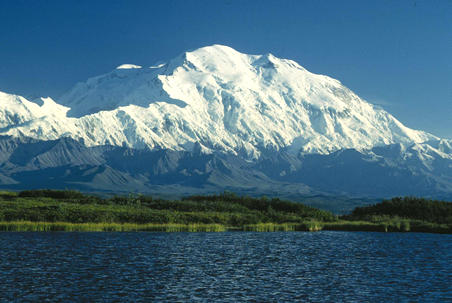
1. Denali in Alaska (federally designated Mount McKinley)

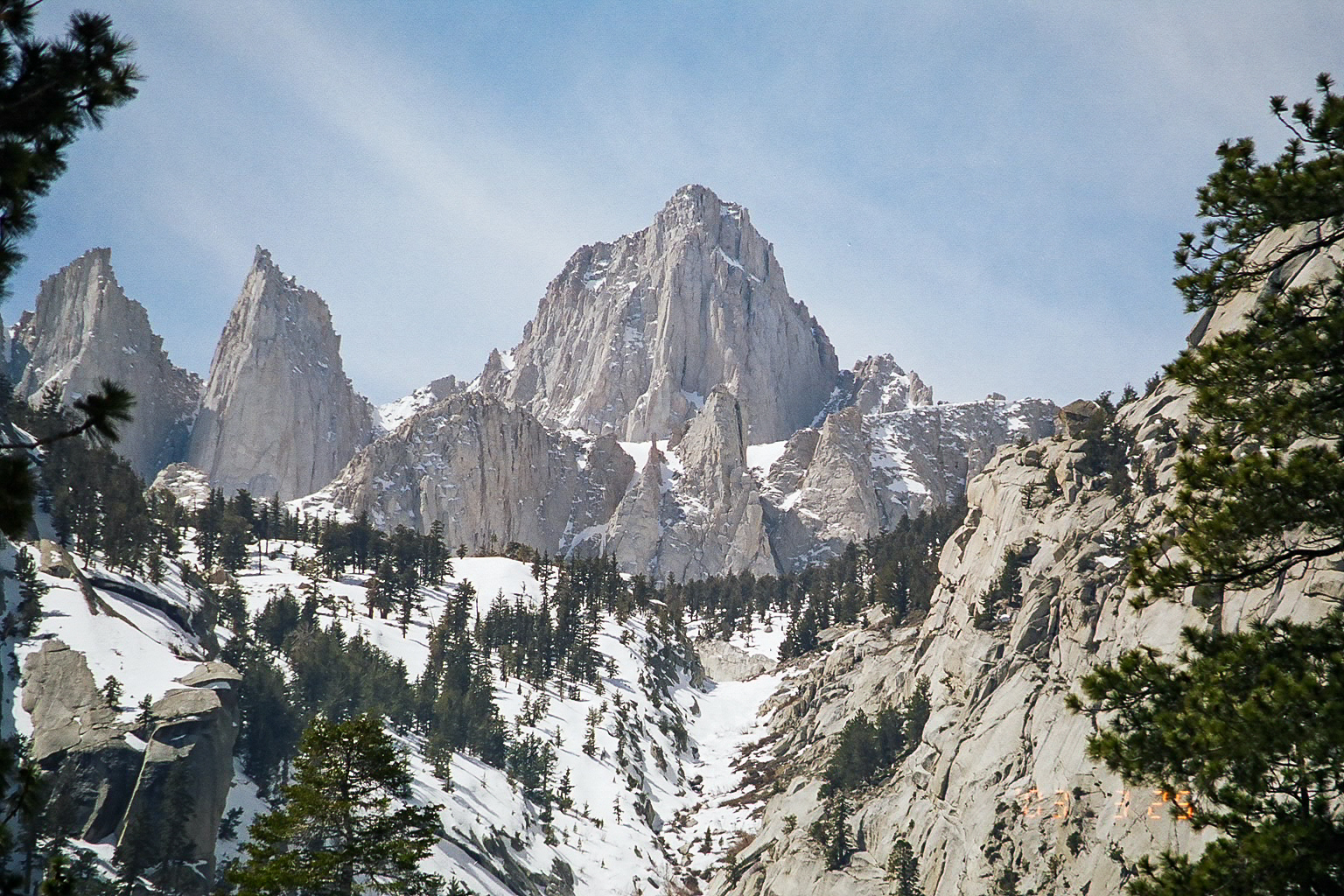
2. Mount Whitney in California

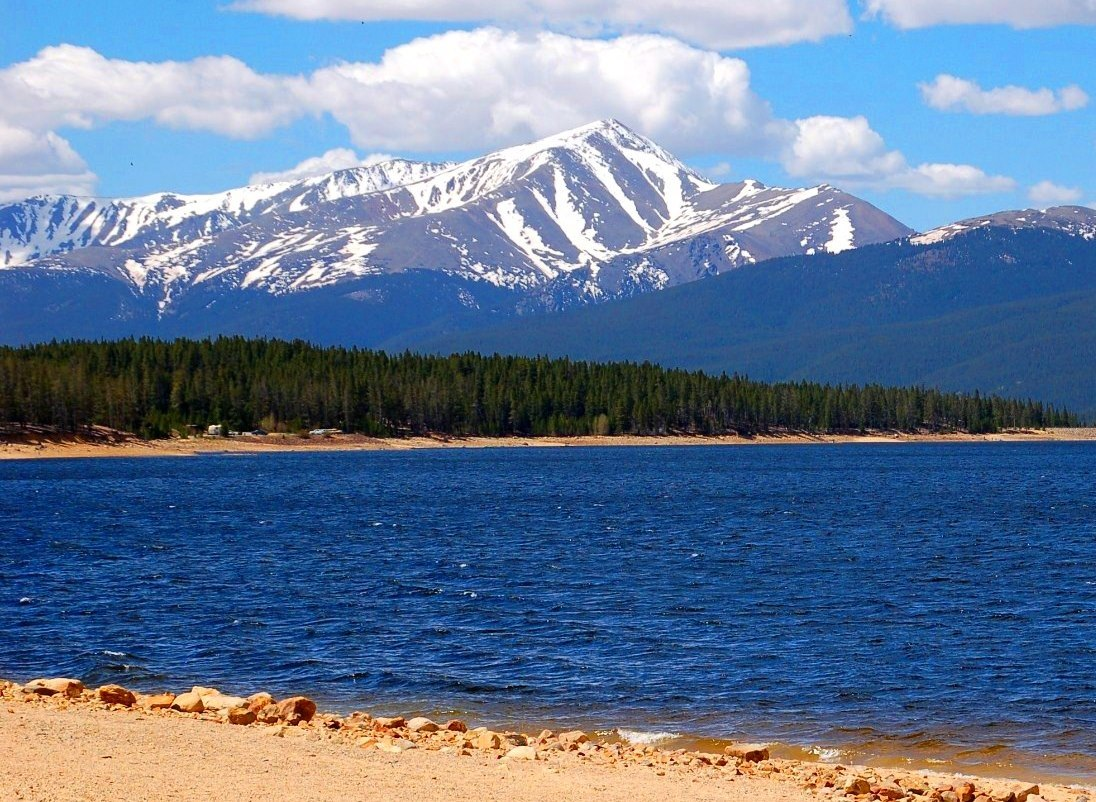
3. Mount Elbert in Colorado

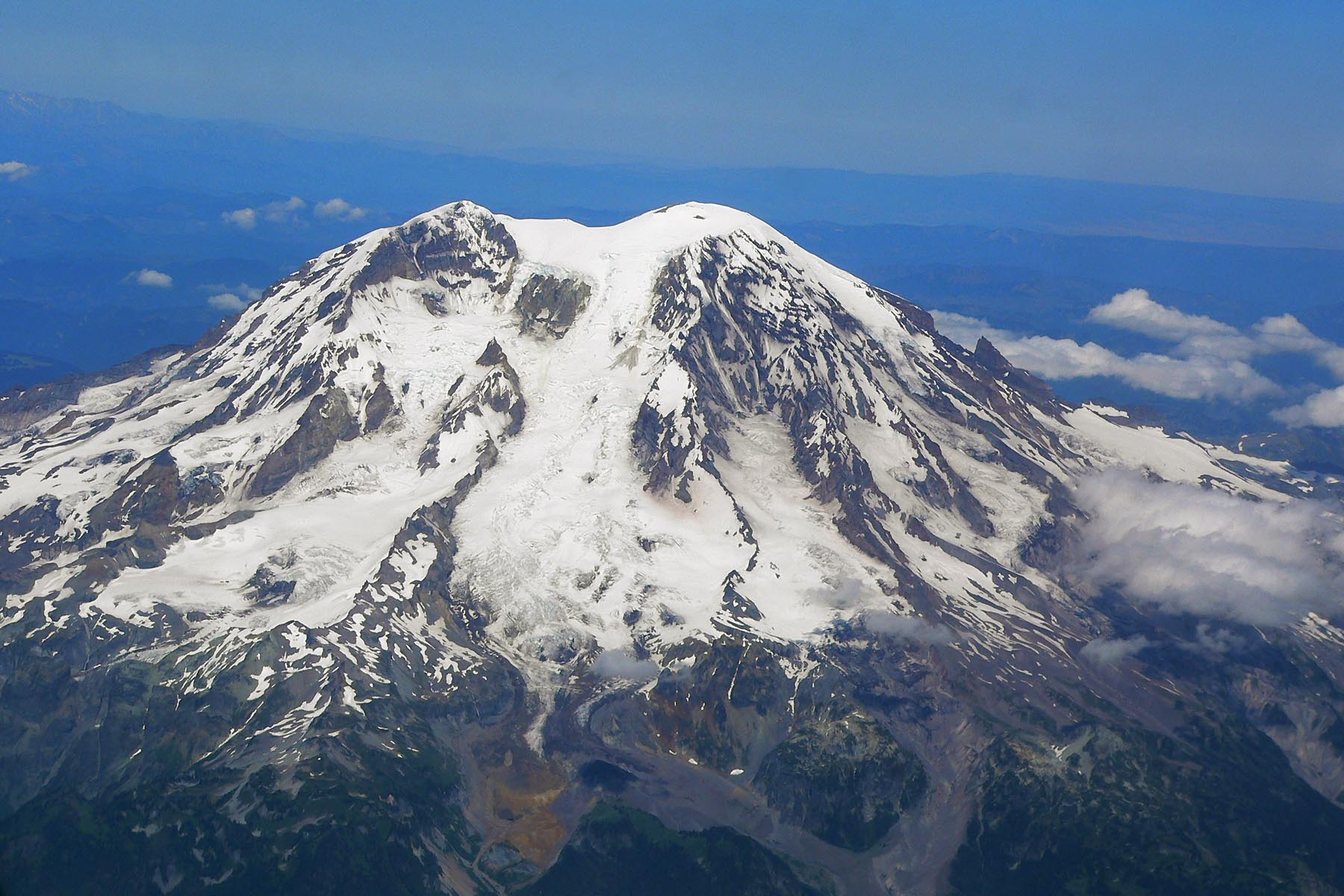
4. Mount Rainier in Washington

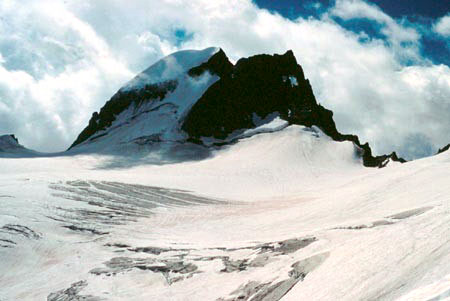
5. Gannett Peak in Wyoming

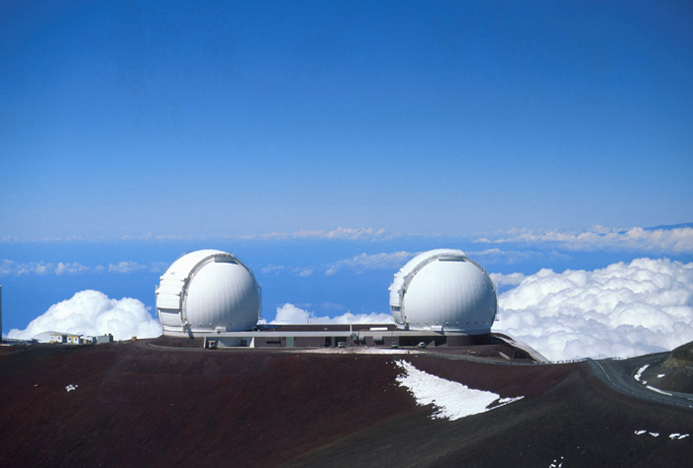
6. Mauna Kea in Hawaiʻi

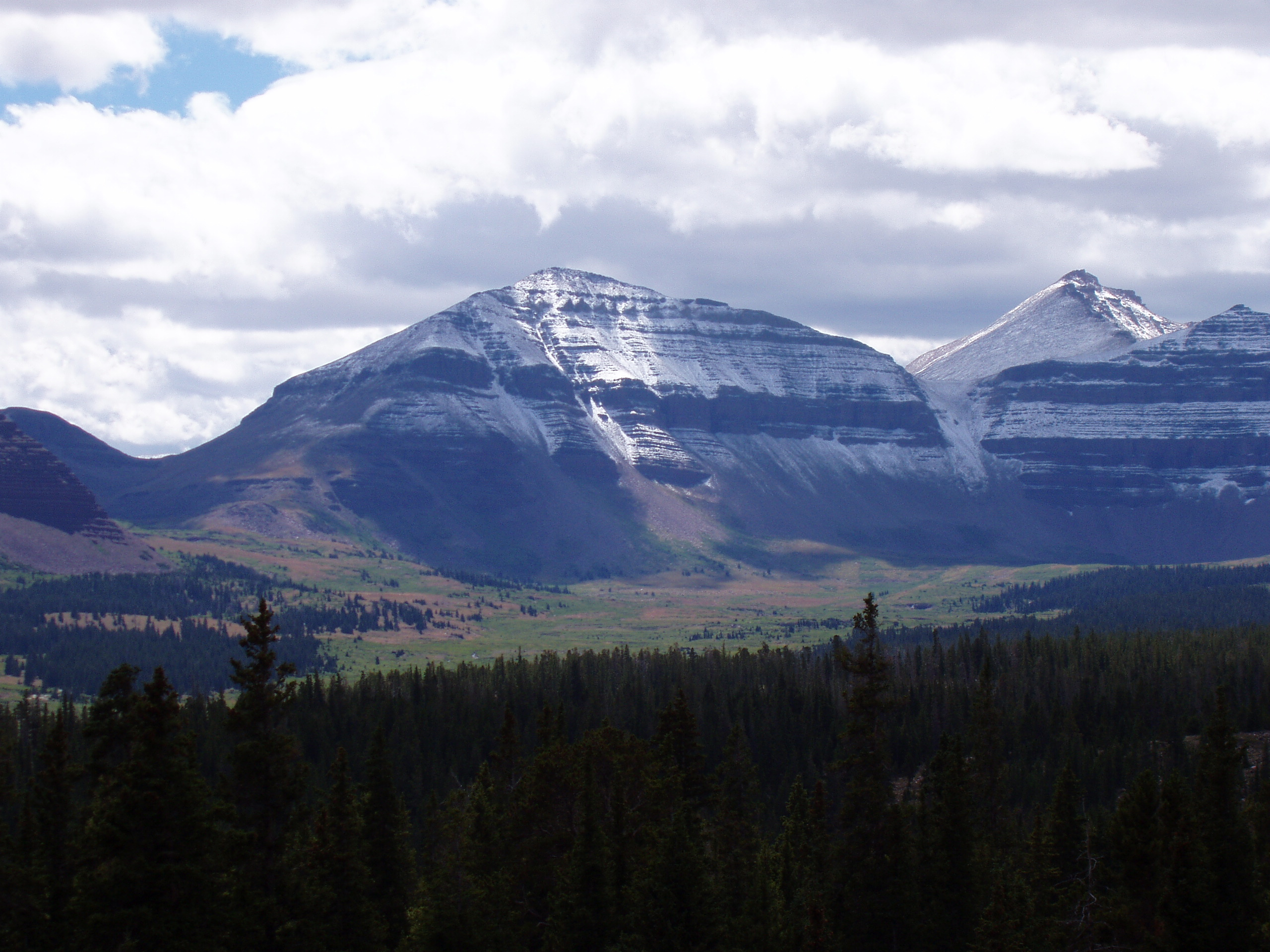
7. Kings Peak in Utah

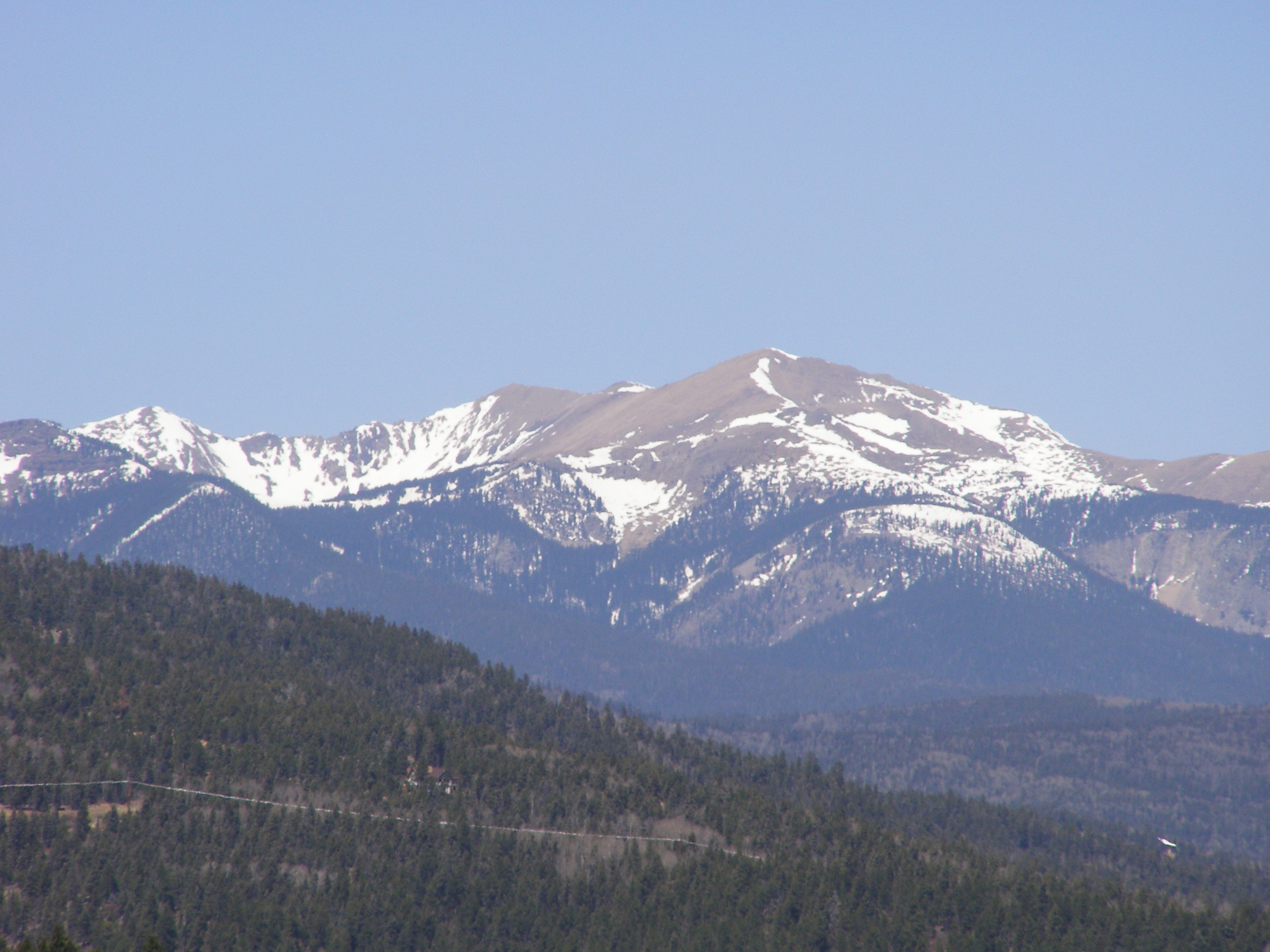
8. Wheeler Peak in New Mexico

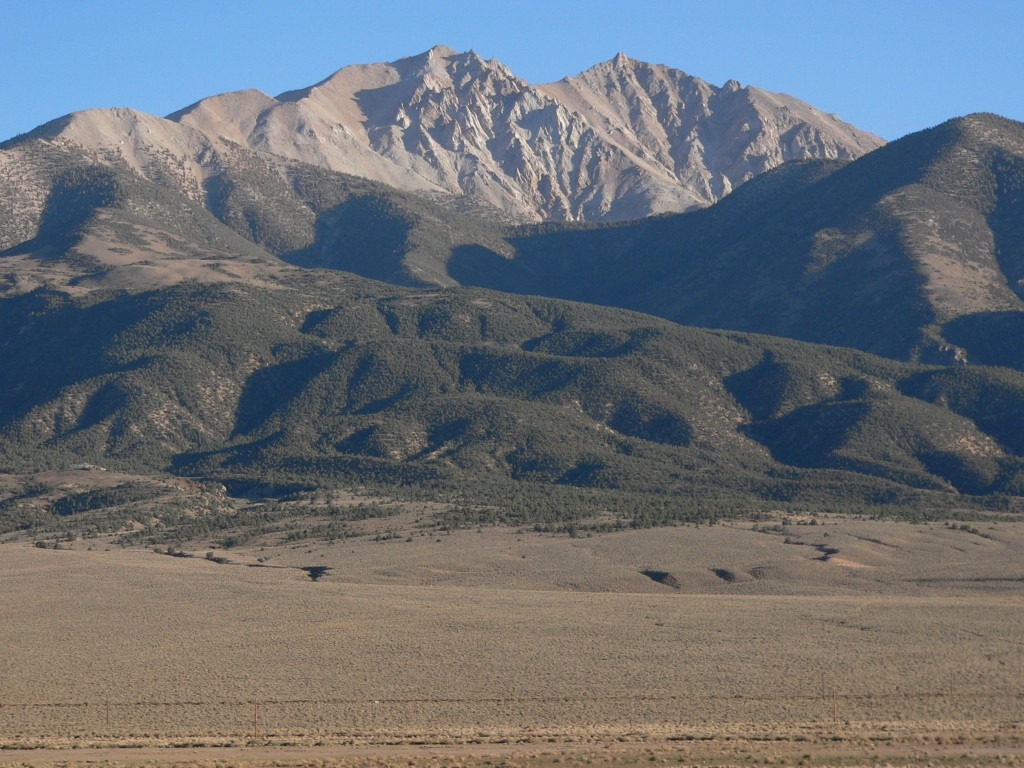
9. Boundary Peak in Nevada

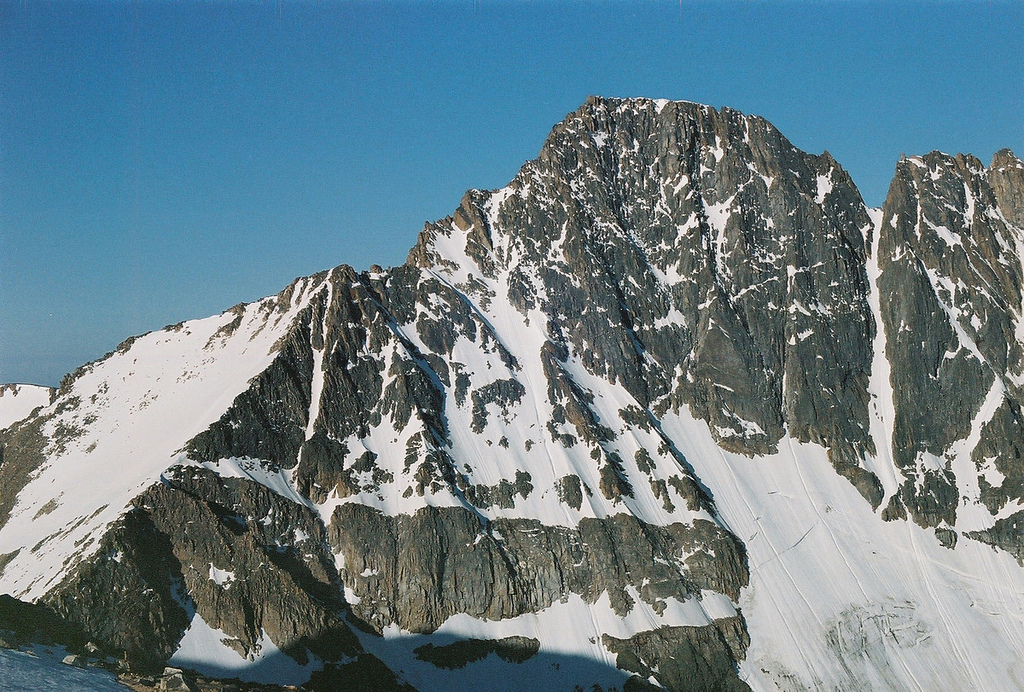
10. Granite Peak in Montana

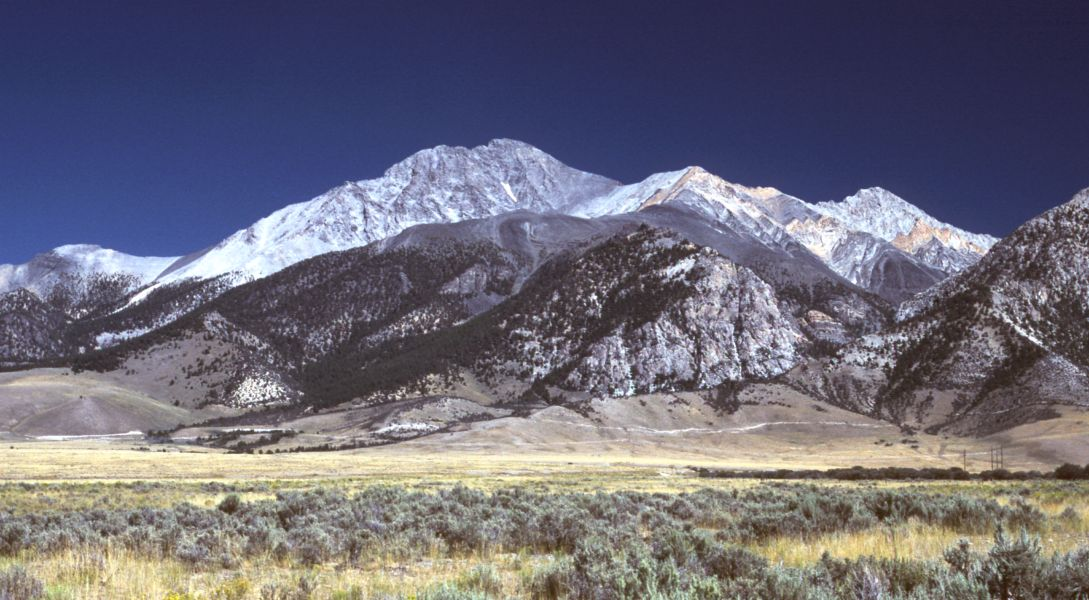
11. Borah Peak in Idaho

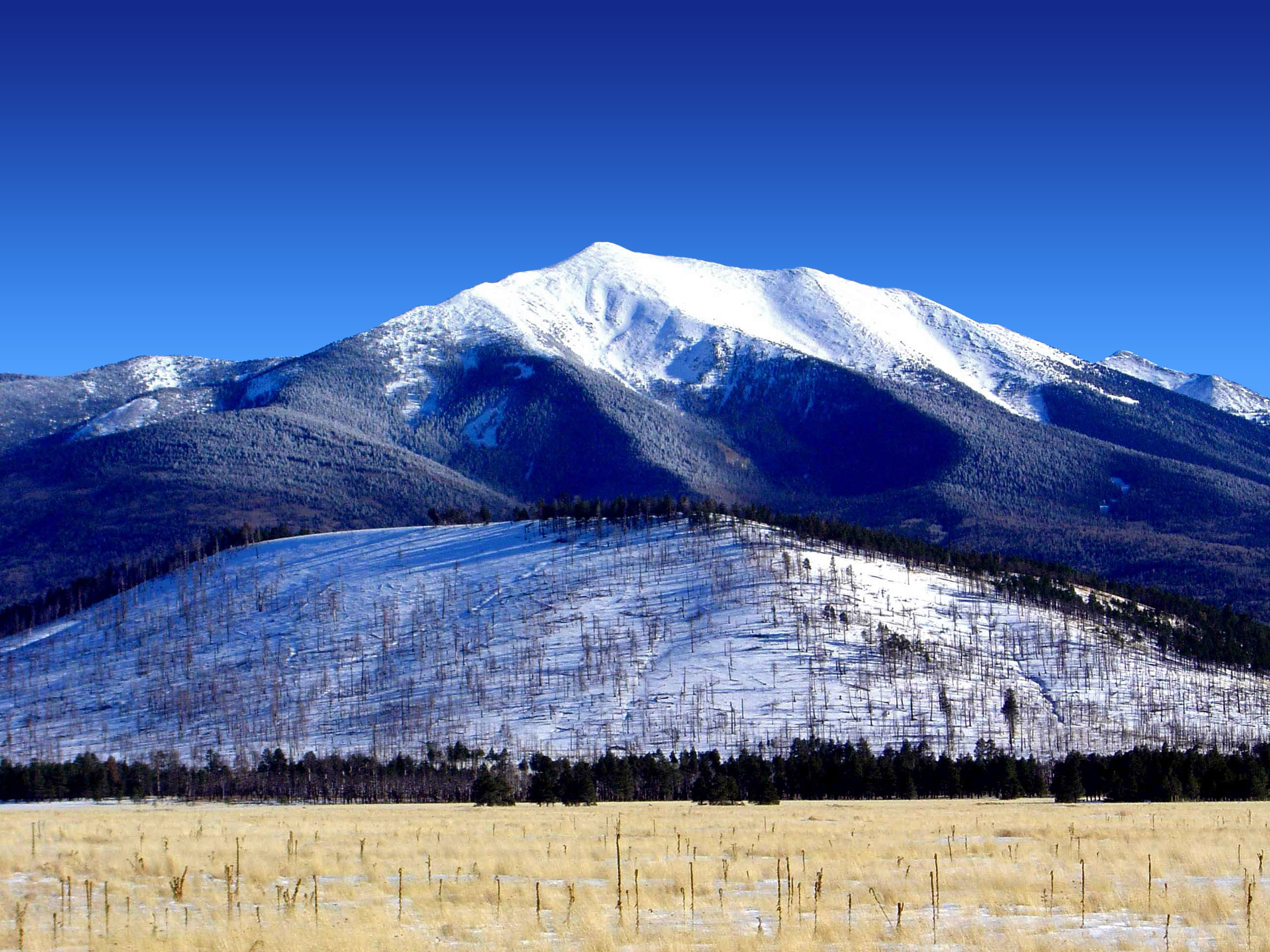
12. Humphreys Peak in Arizona

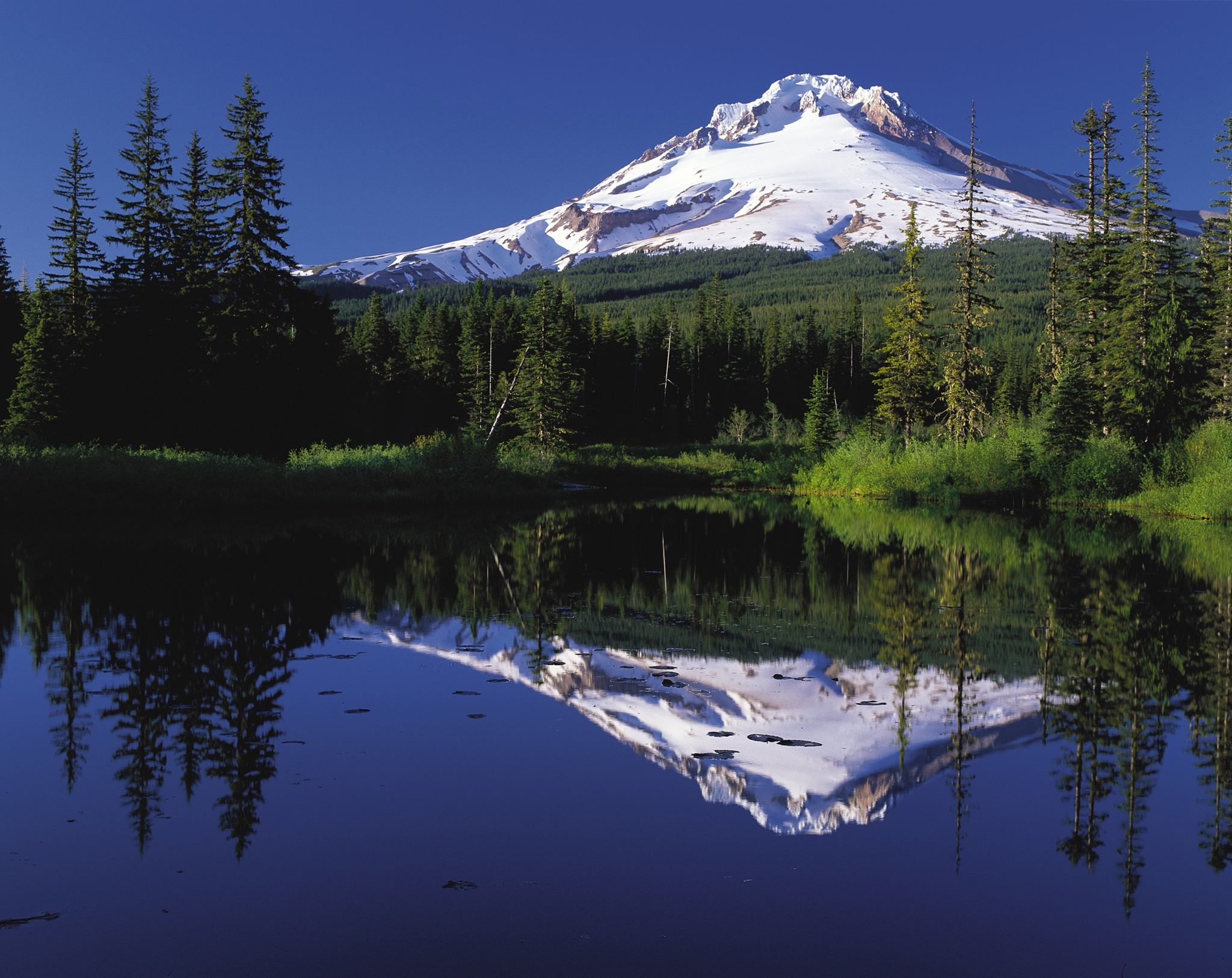
13. Mount Hood in Oregon

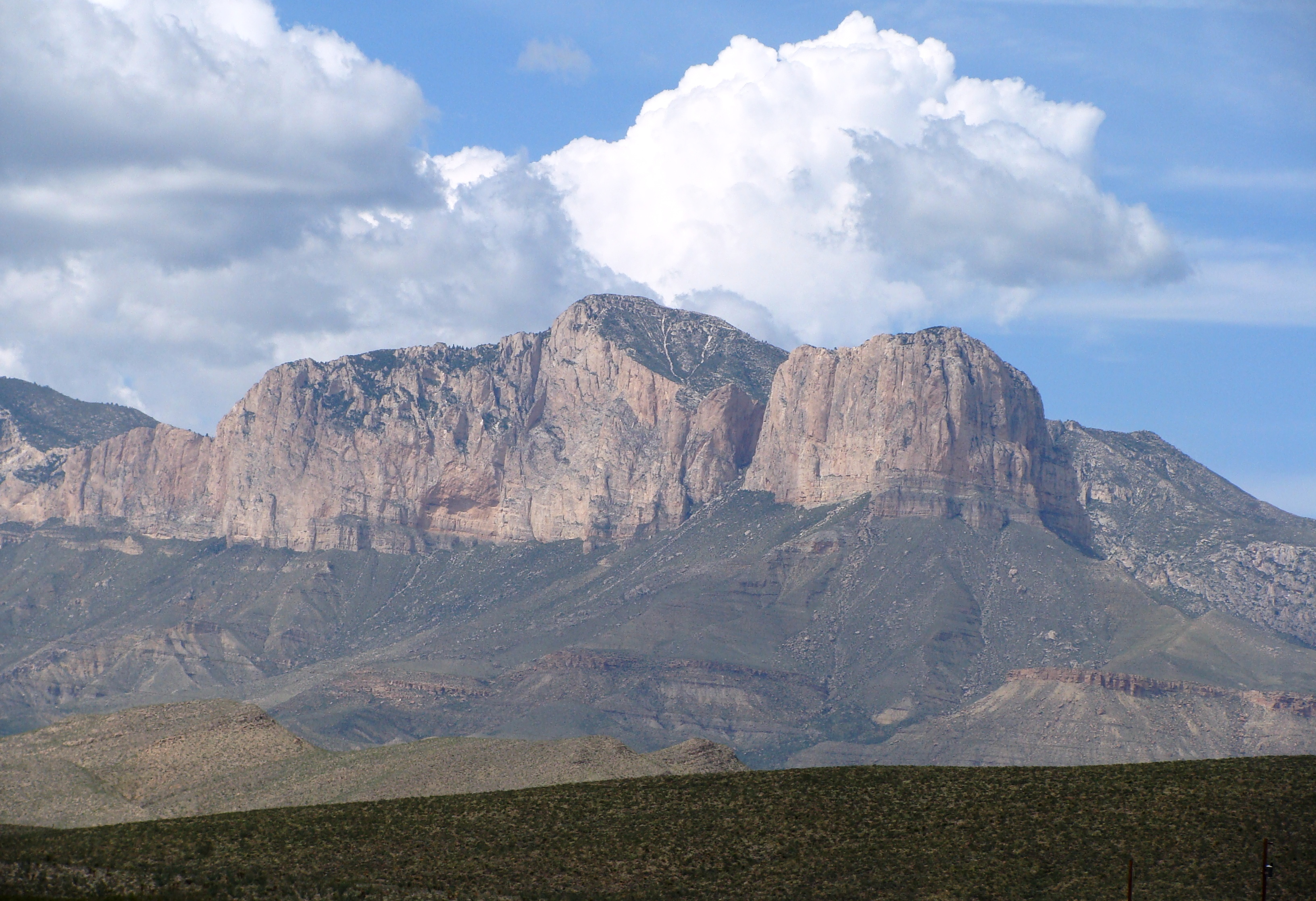
14. Guadalupe Peak in Texas

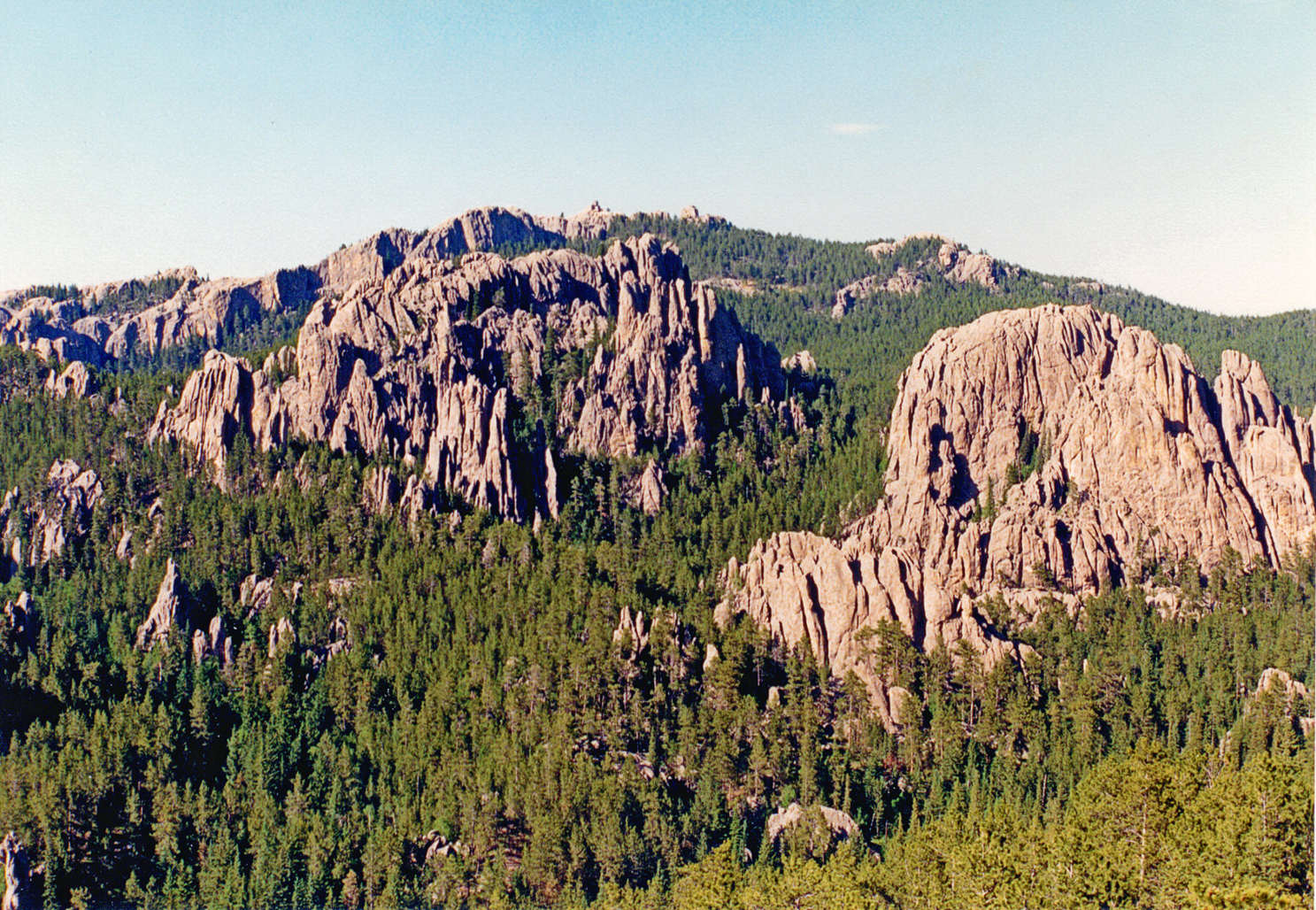
15. Black Elk Peak in South Dakota (formerly Harney Peak)

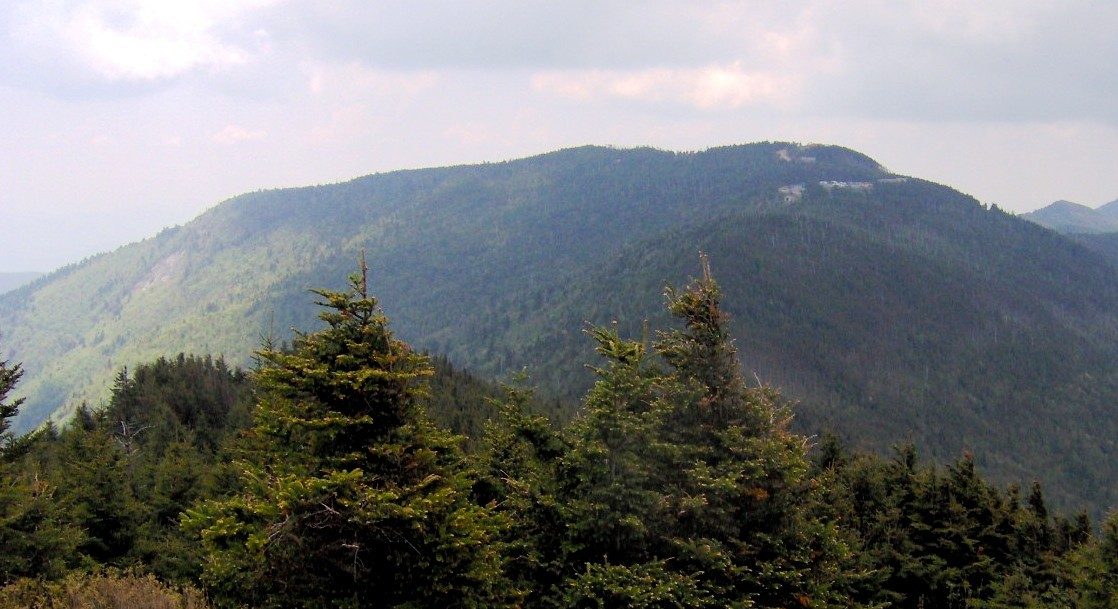
16. Mount Mitchell in North Carolina

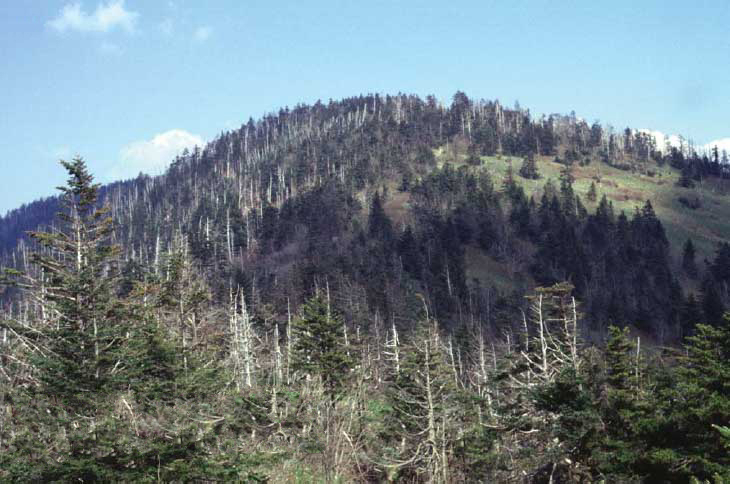
17. Kuwohi in Tennessee (formerly Clingmans Dome)

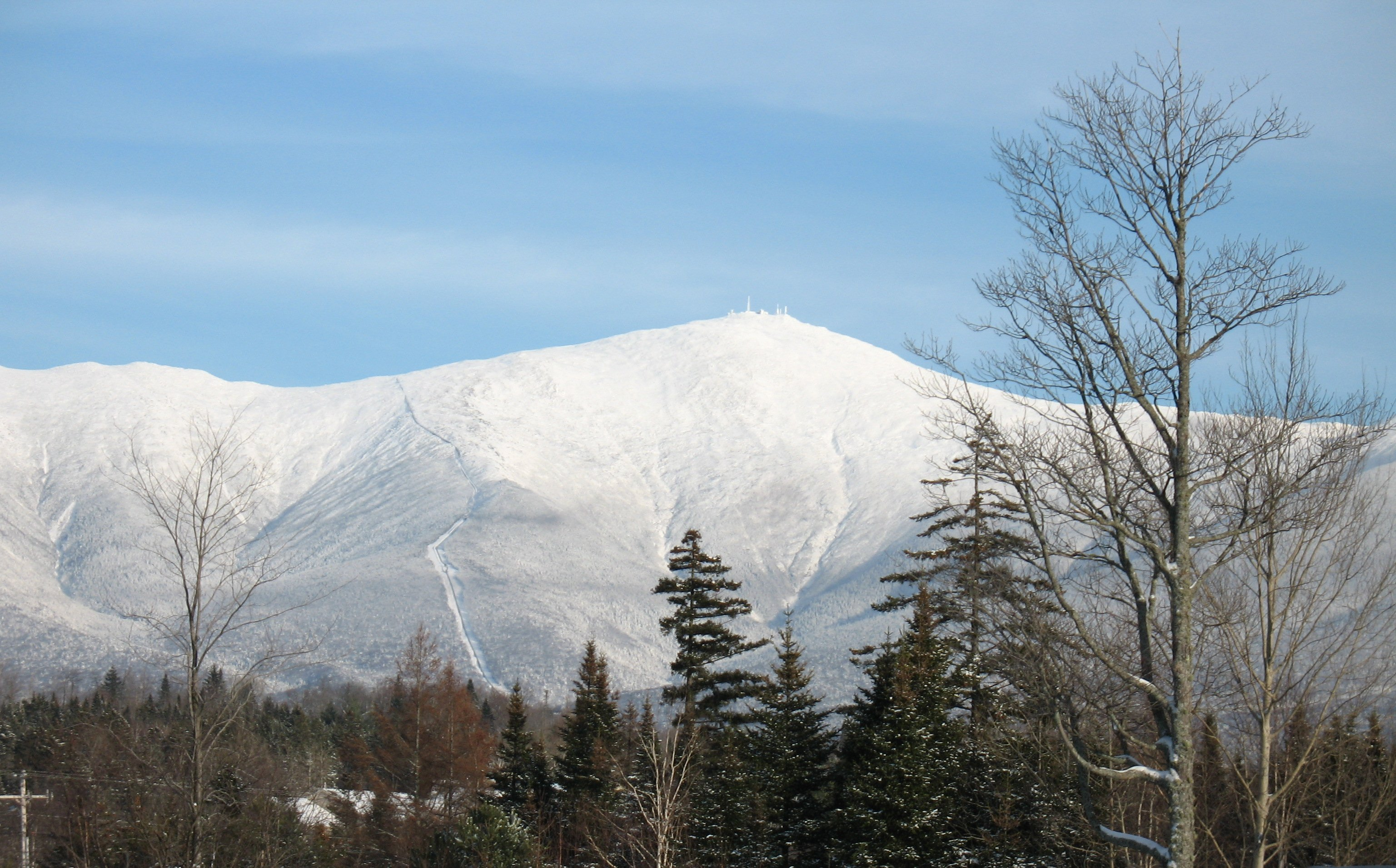
18. Mount Washington in New Hampshire

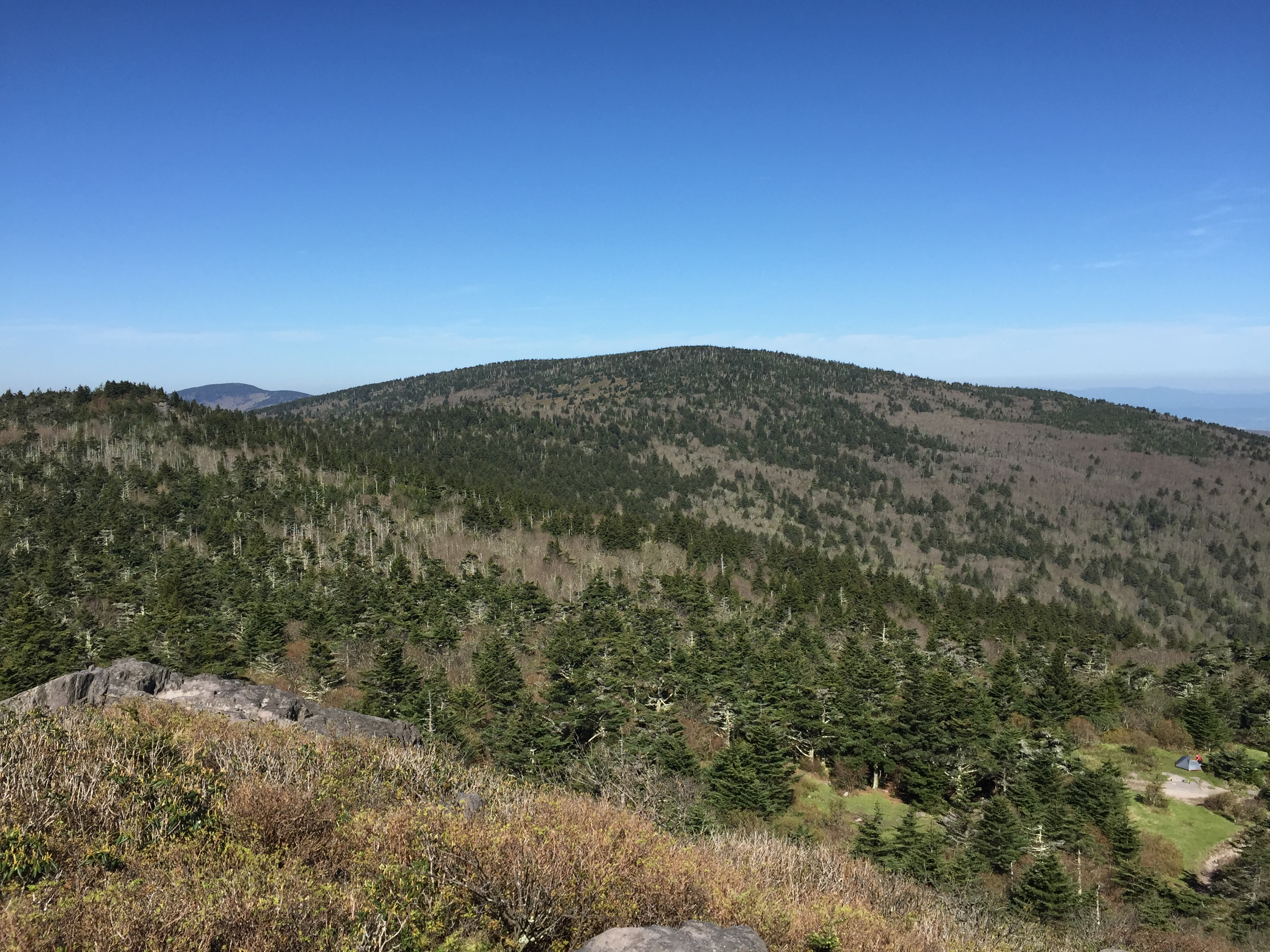
19. Mount Rogers in Virginia

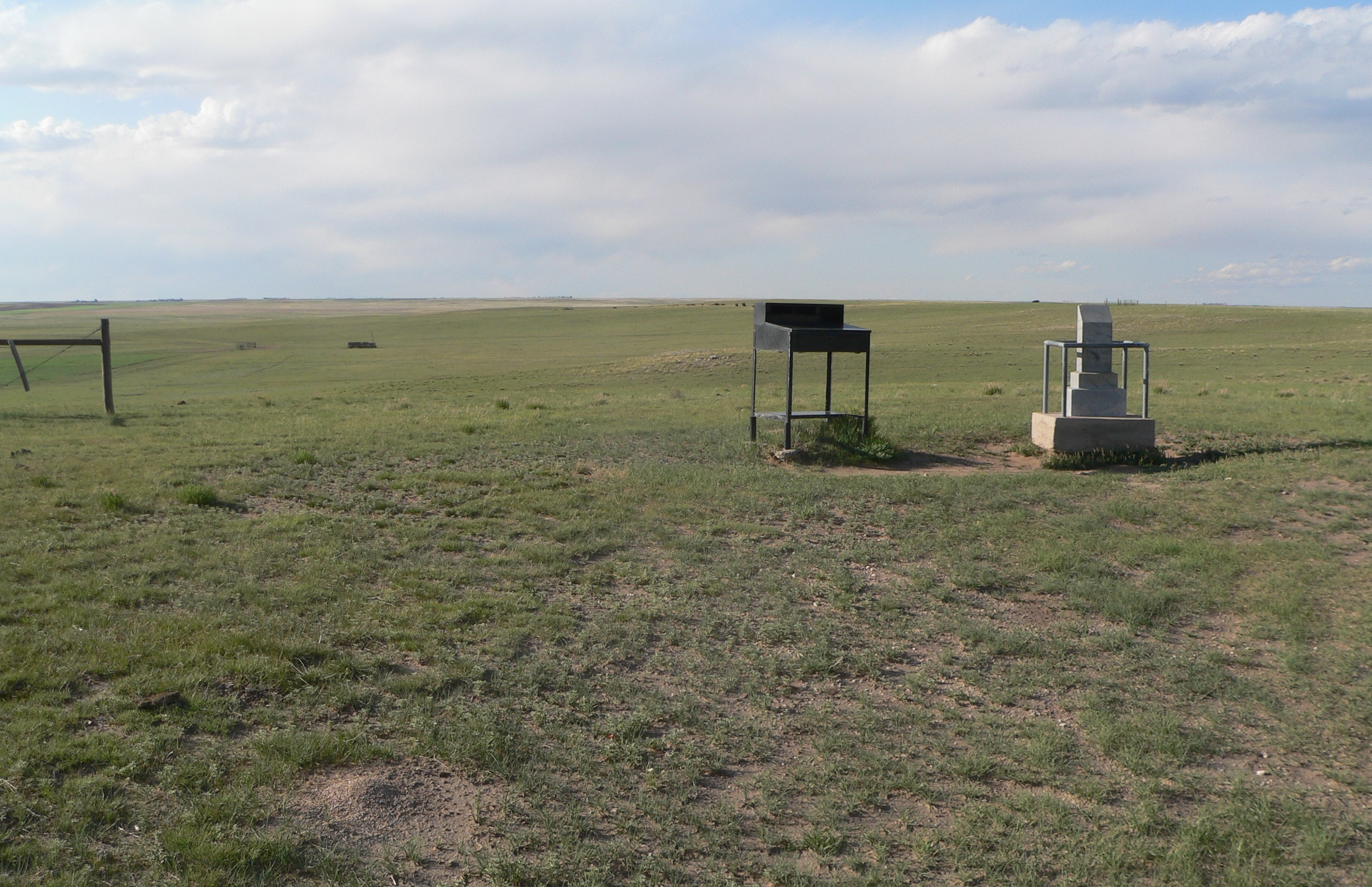
20. Panorama Point in Nebraska

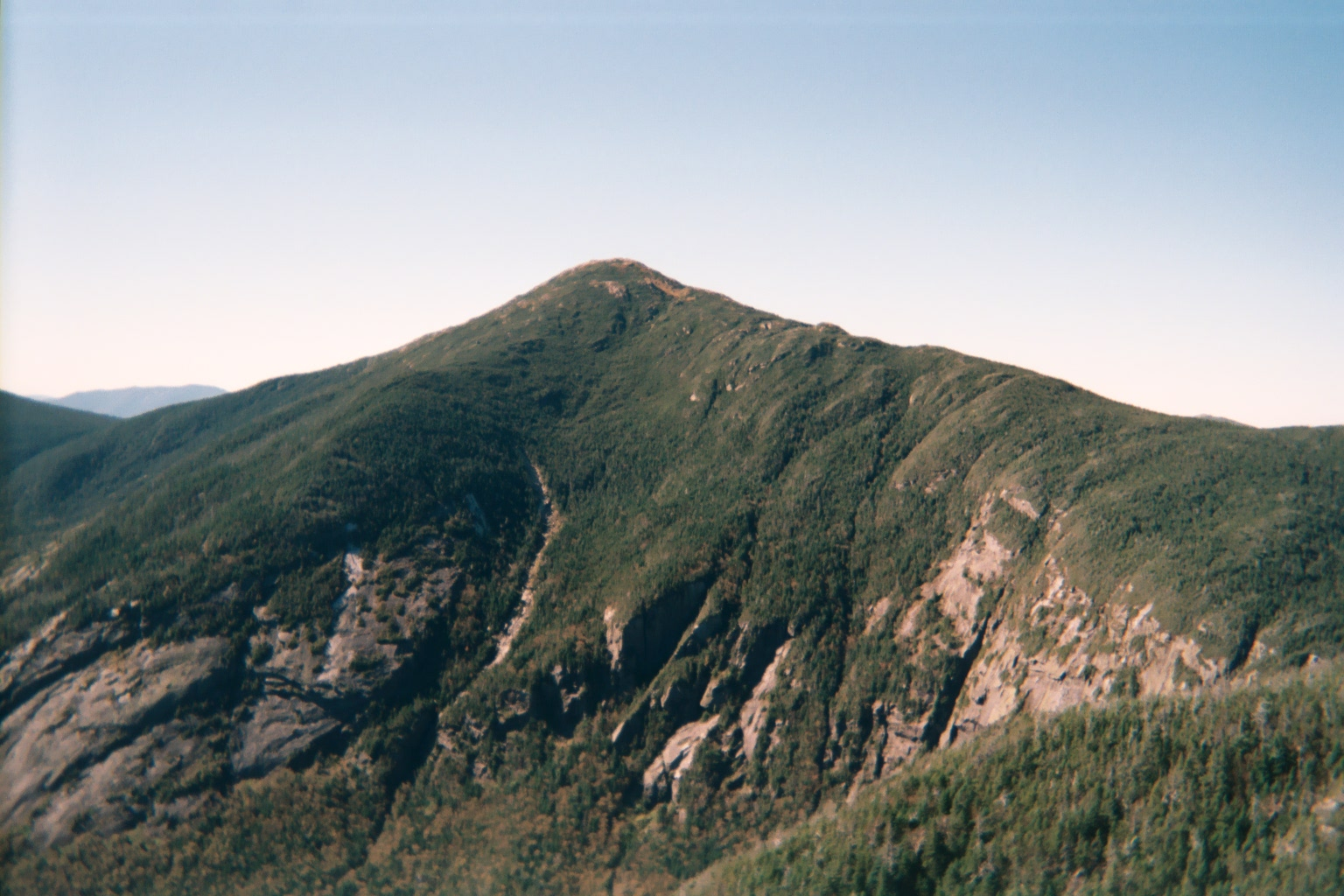
21. Mount Marcy in New York

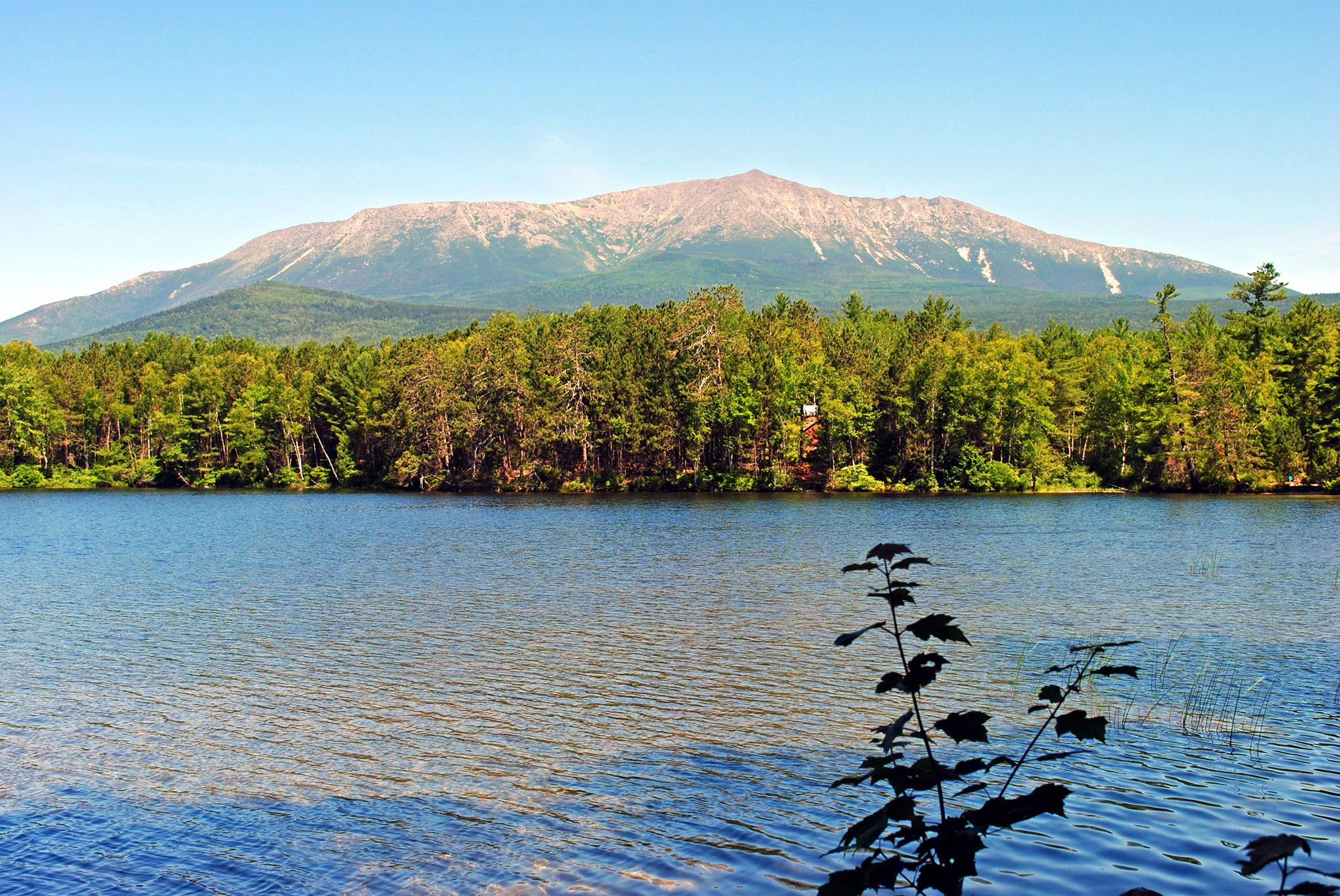
22. Mount Katahdin in Maine

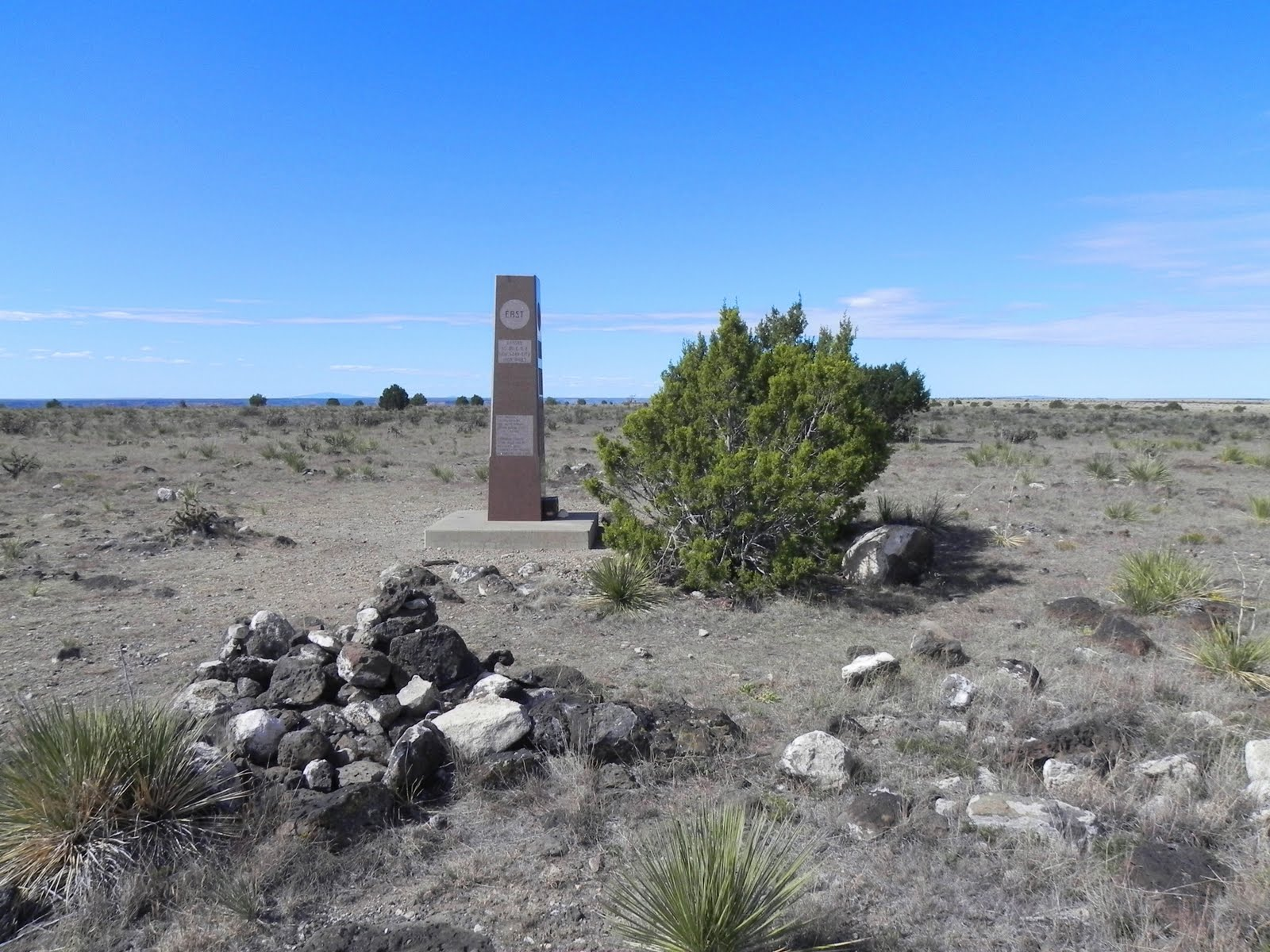
23. Black Mesa in Oklahoma

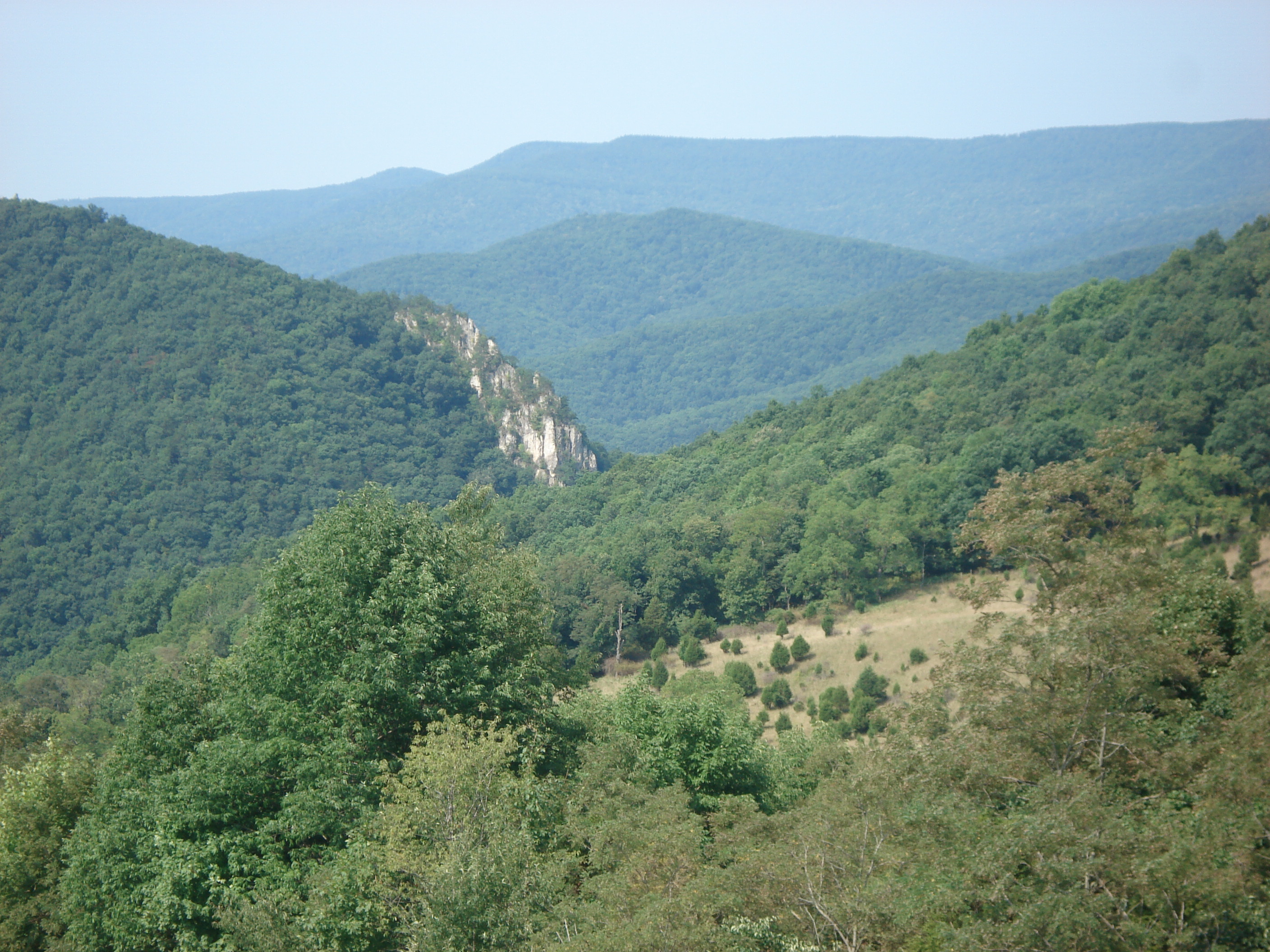
24. Spruce Knob in West Virginia (background mountain)

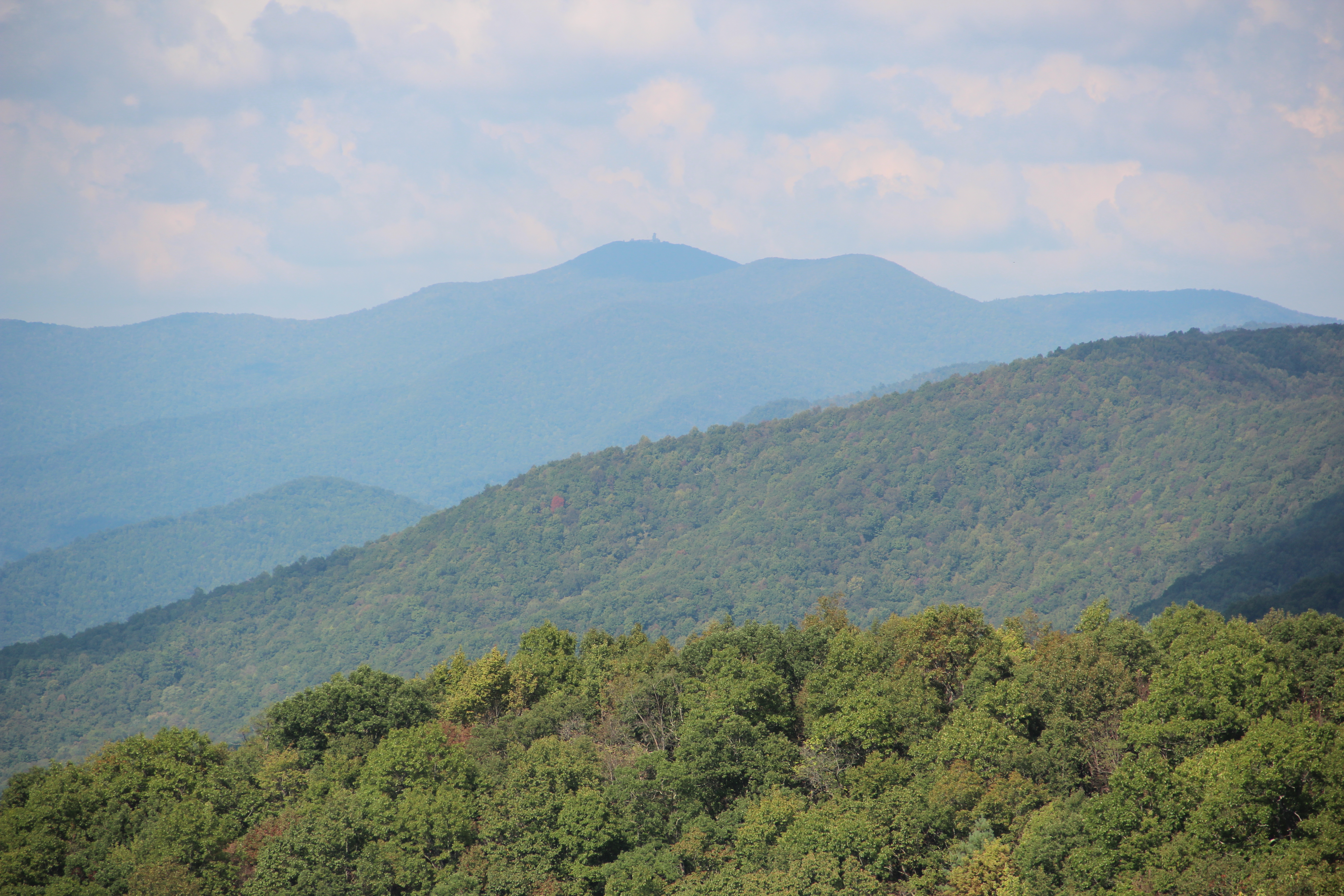
25. Brasstown Bald in Georgia (background mountain)

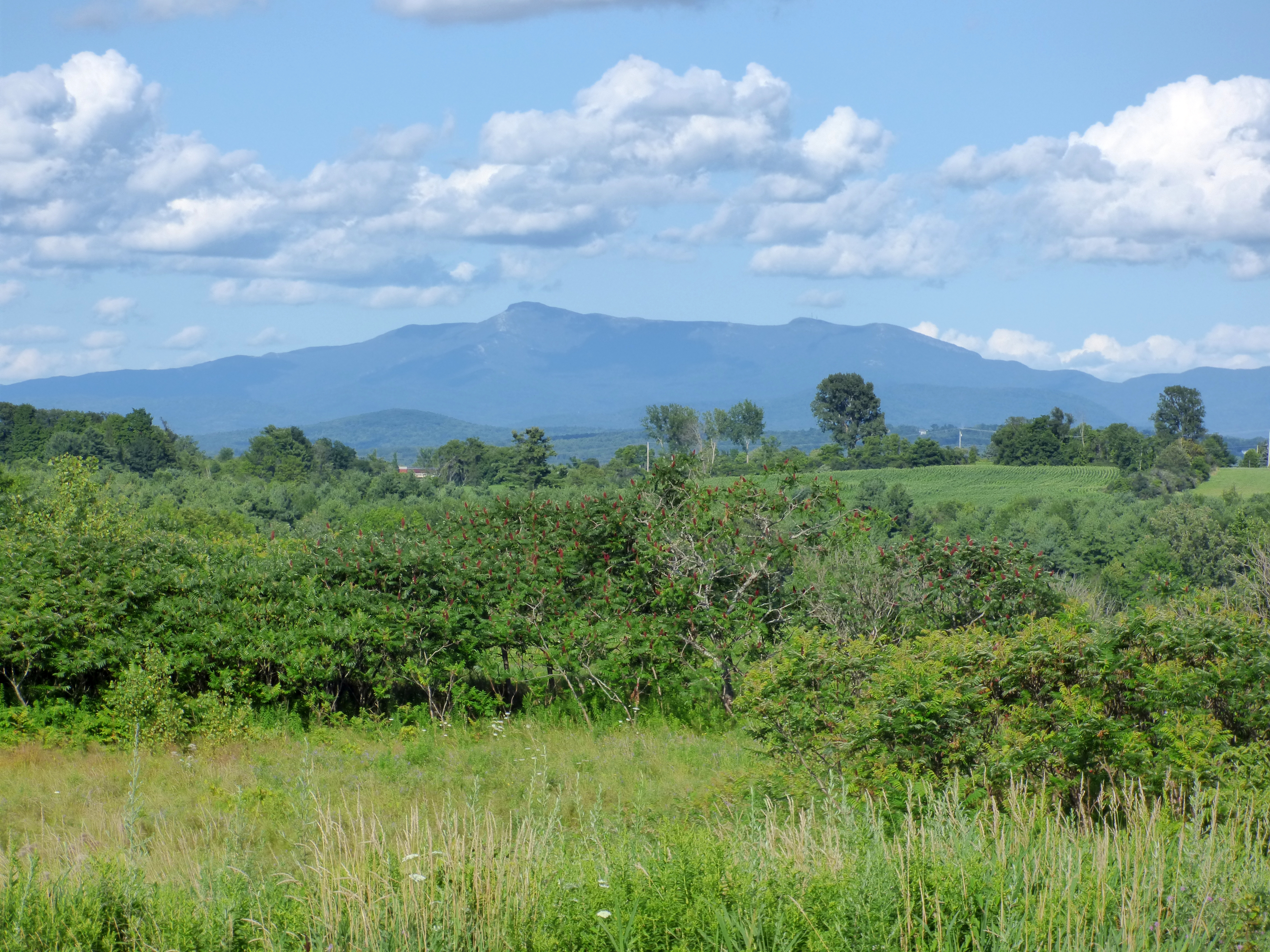
26. Mount Mansfield in Vermont

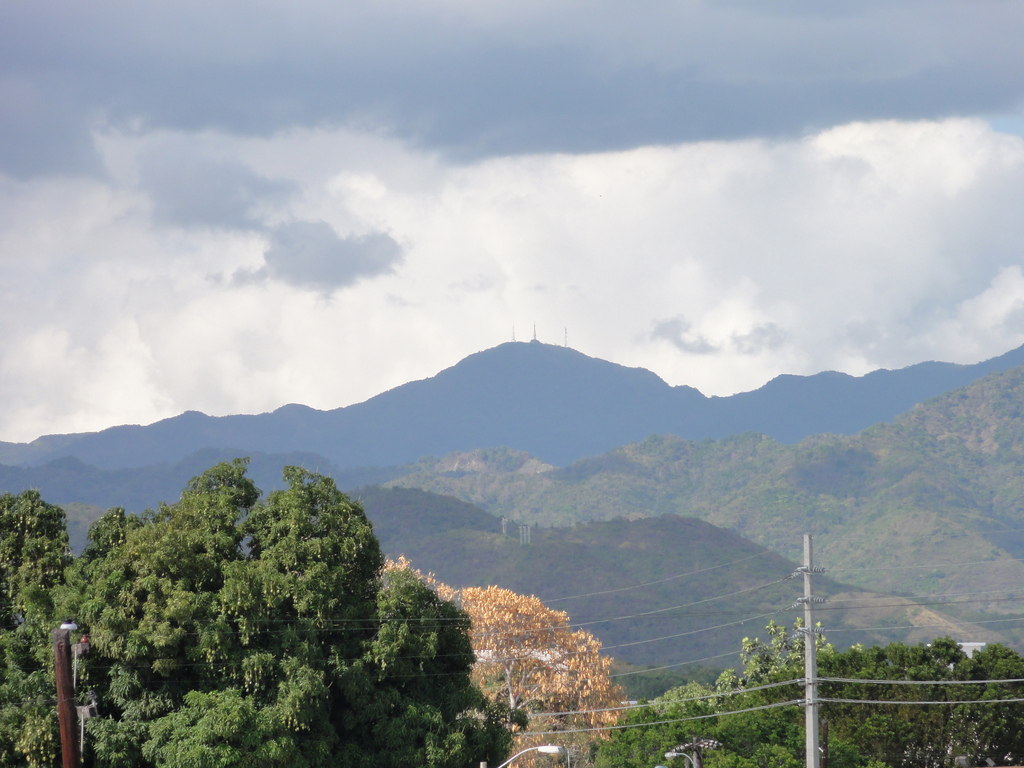
27. Cerro de Punta in Puerto Rico

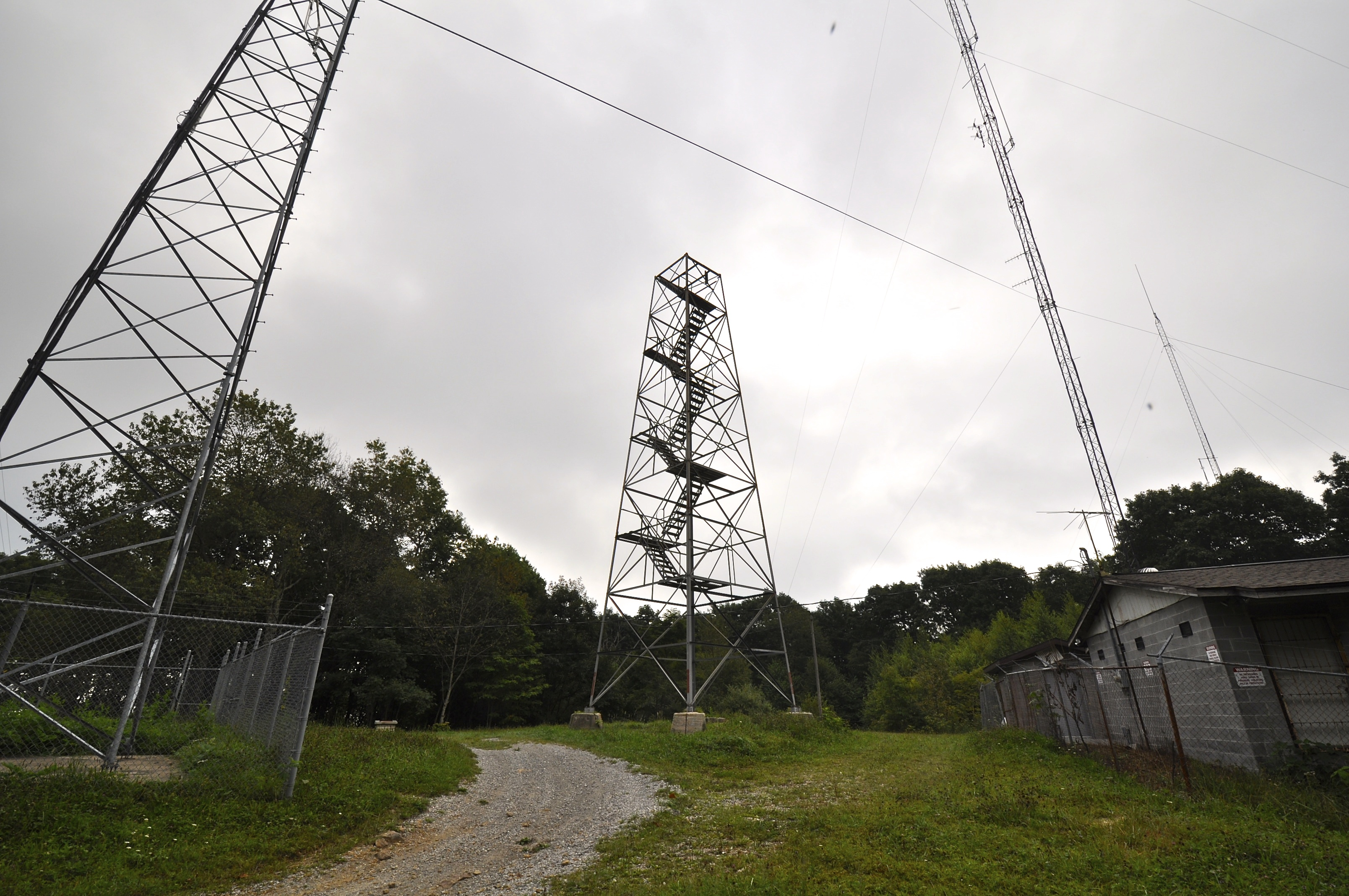
28. Black Mountain in Kentucky

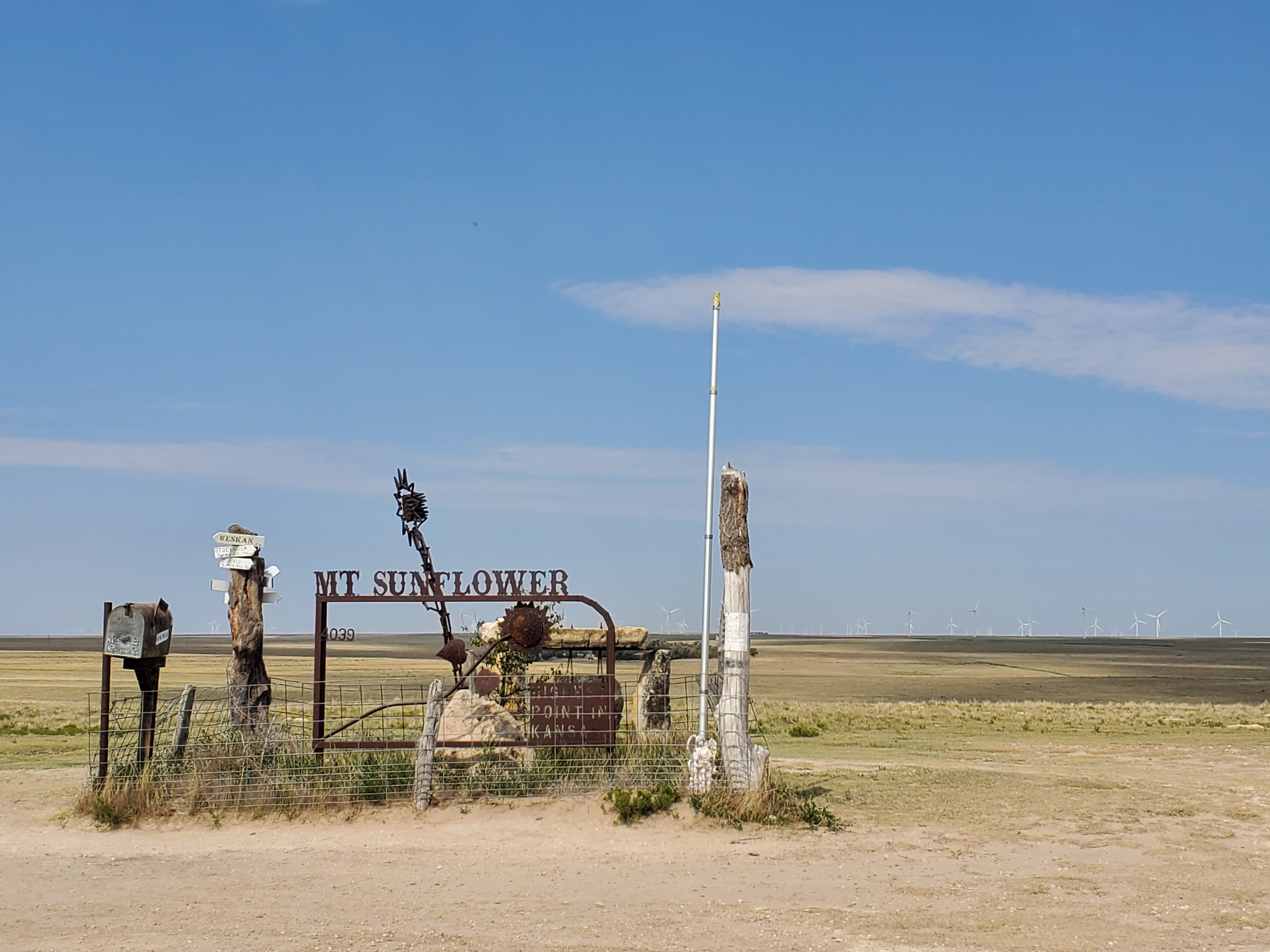
29. Mount Sunflower in Kansas

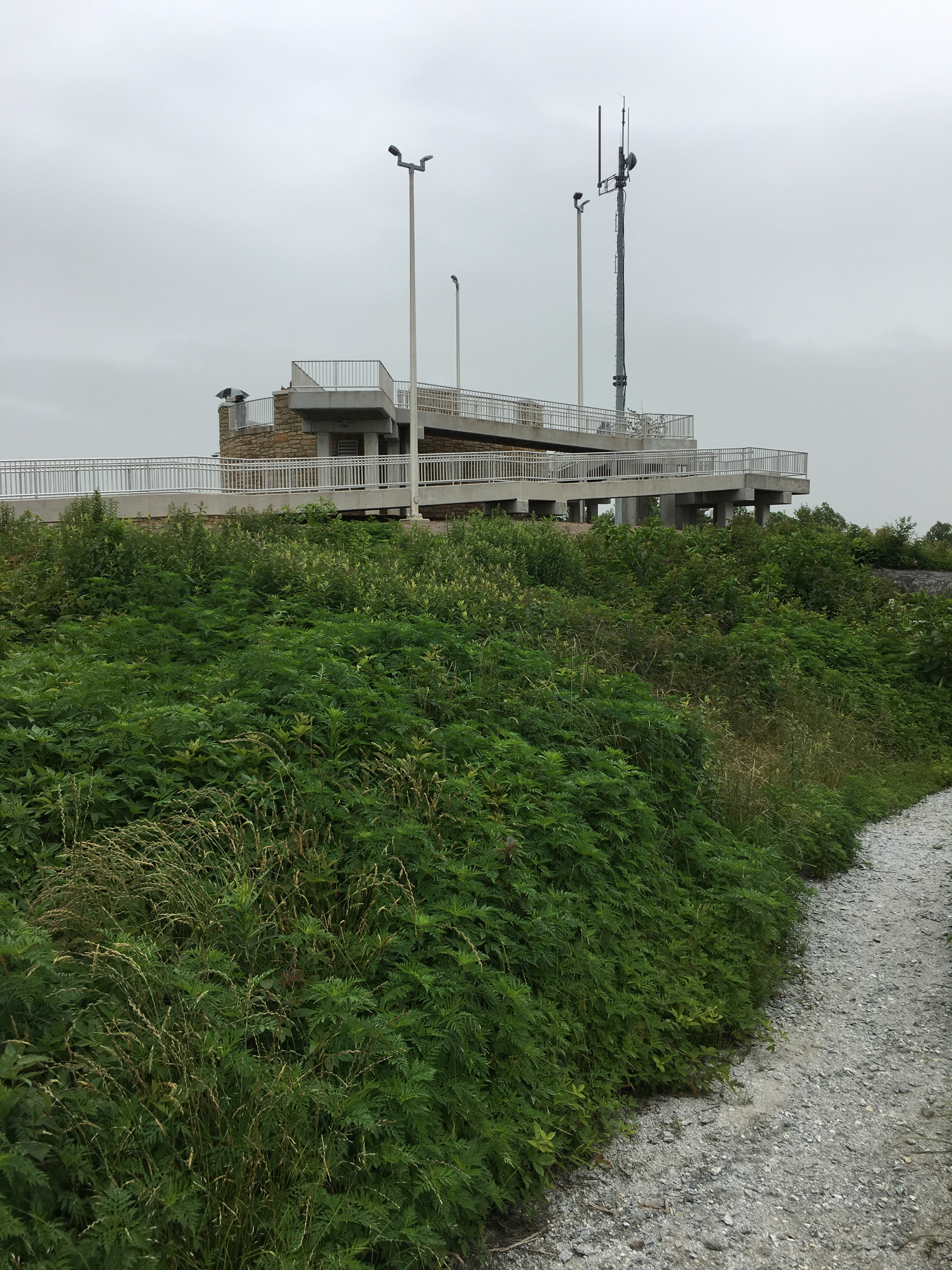
30. Sassafras Mountain in South Carolina

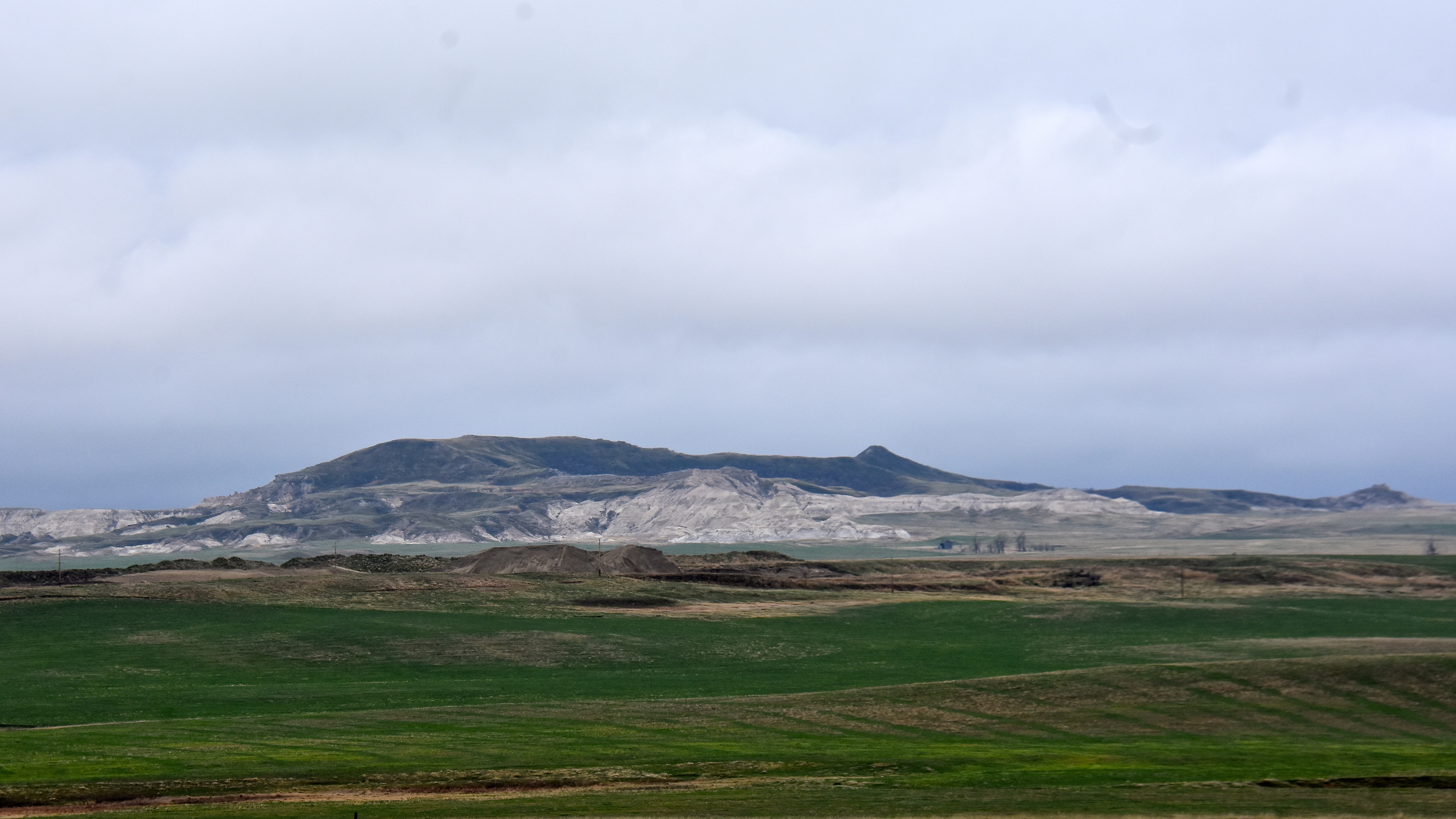
31. White Butte in North Dakota

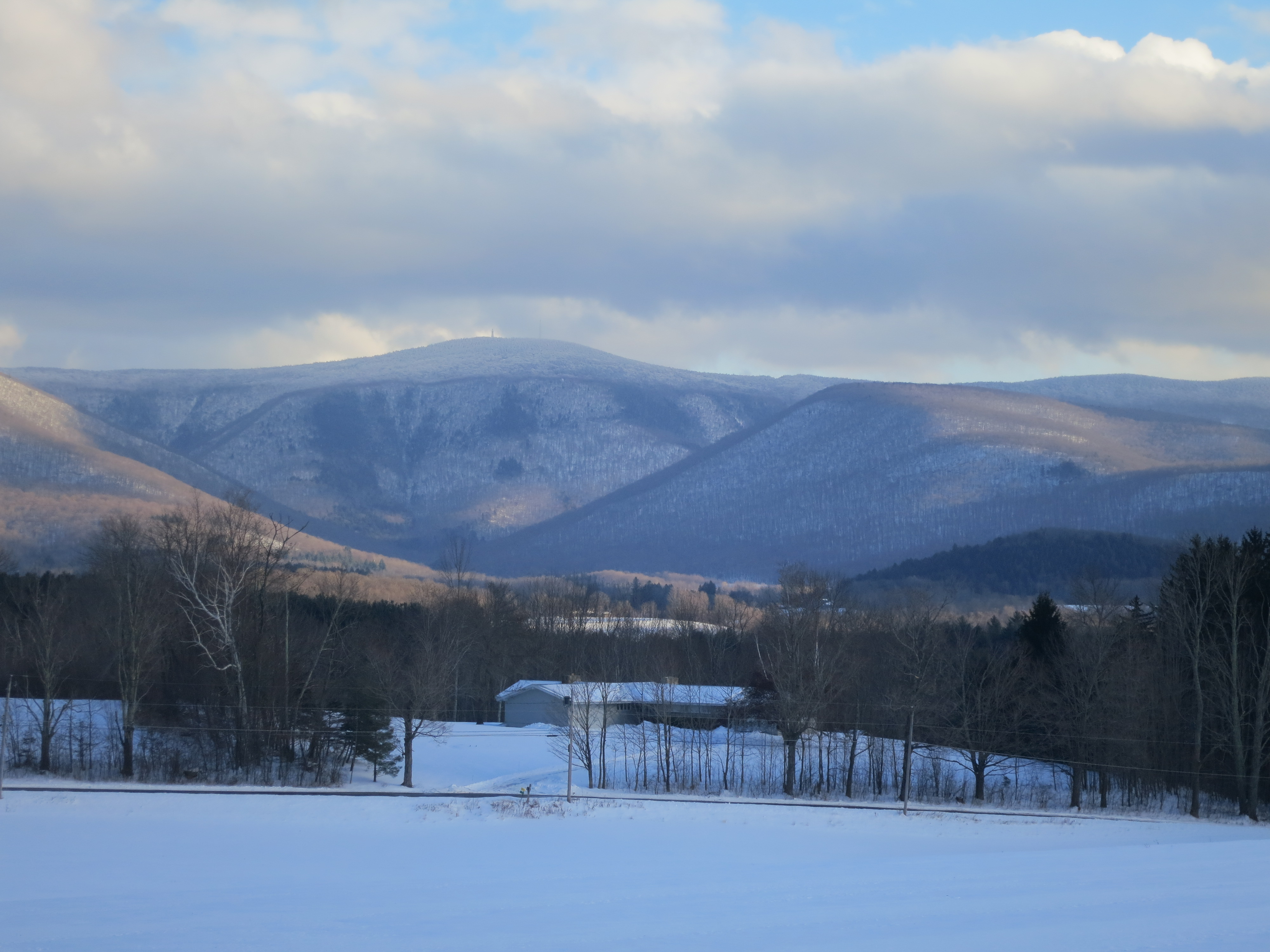
32. Mount Greylock in Massachusetts

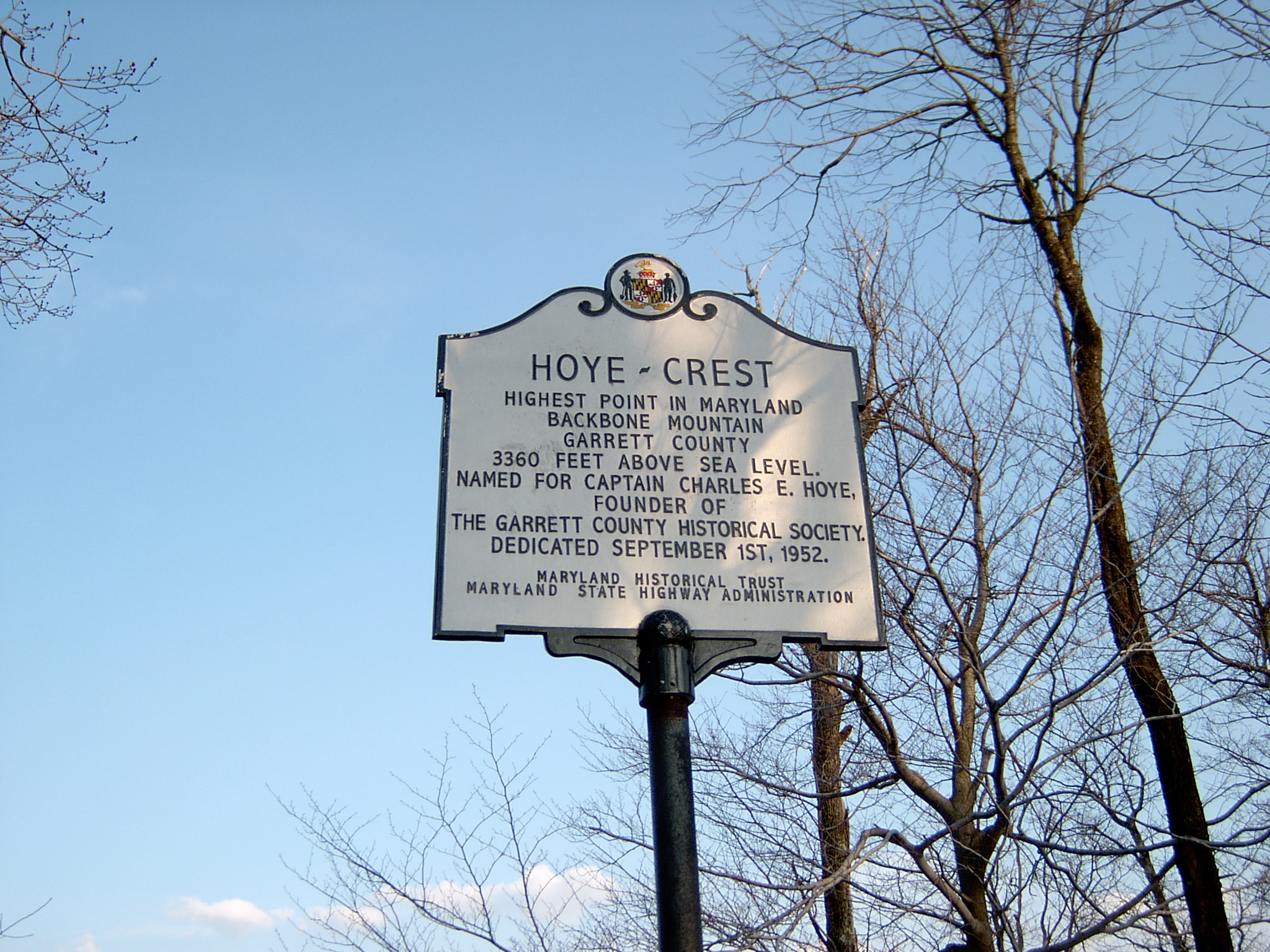
33. Hoye-Crest in Maryland

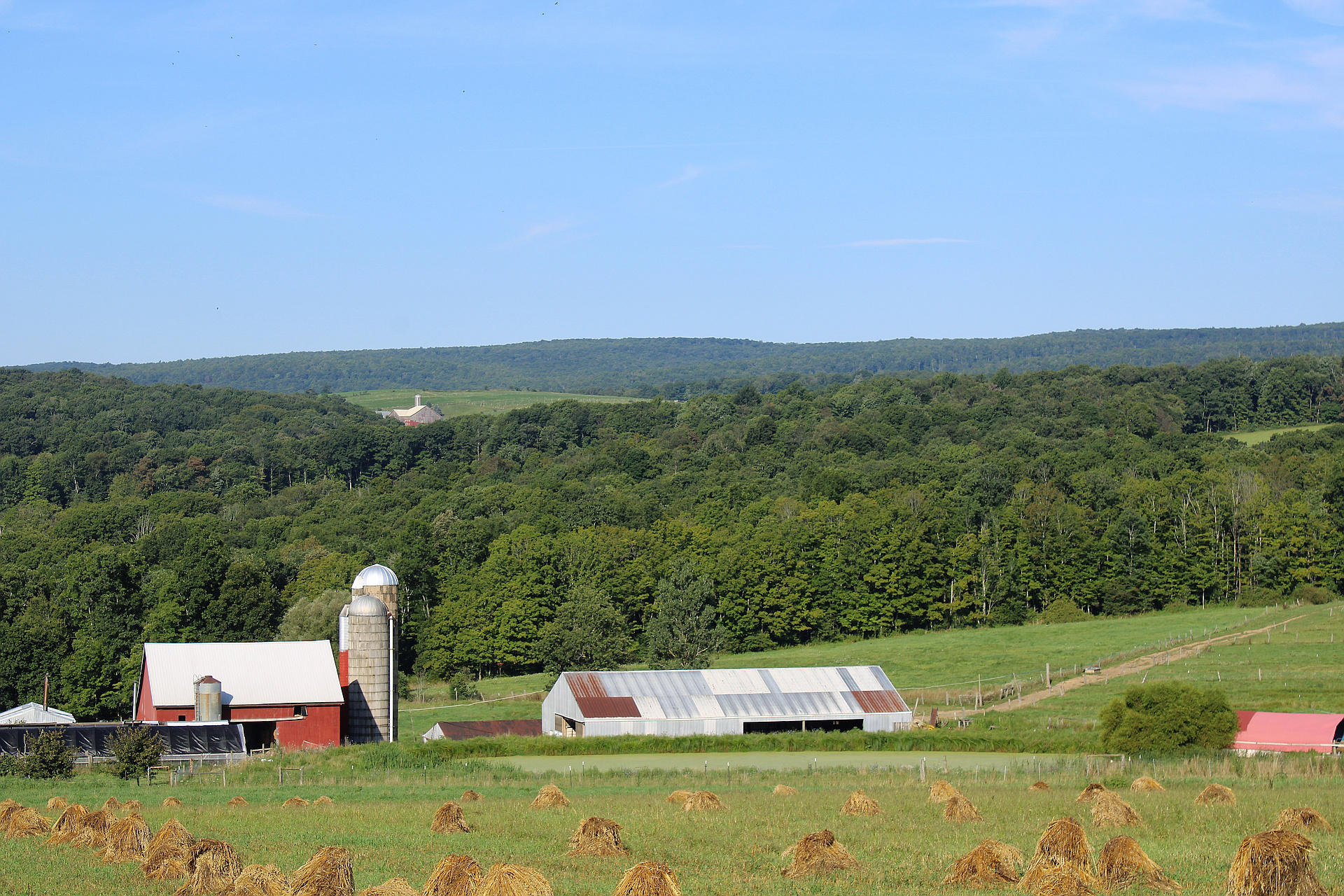
34. Mount Davis in Pennsylvania (background mountain)

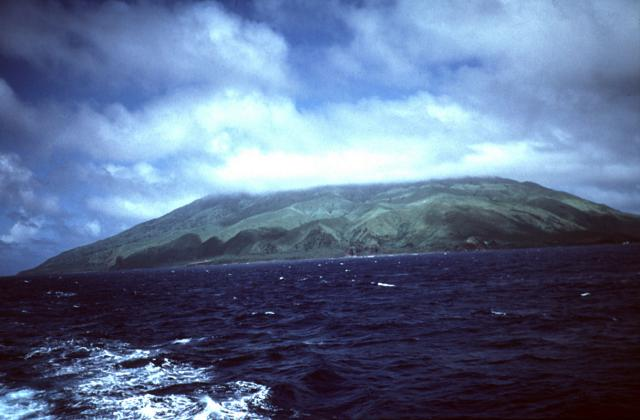
35. Mount Agrihan in the Northern Mariana Islands

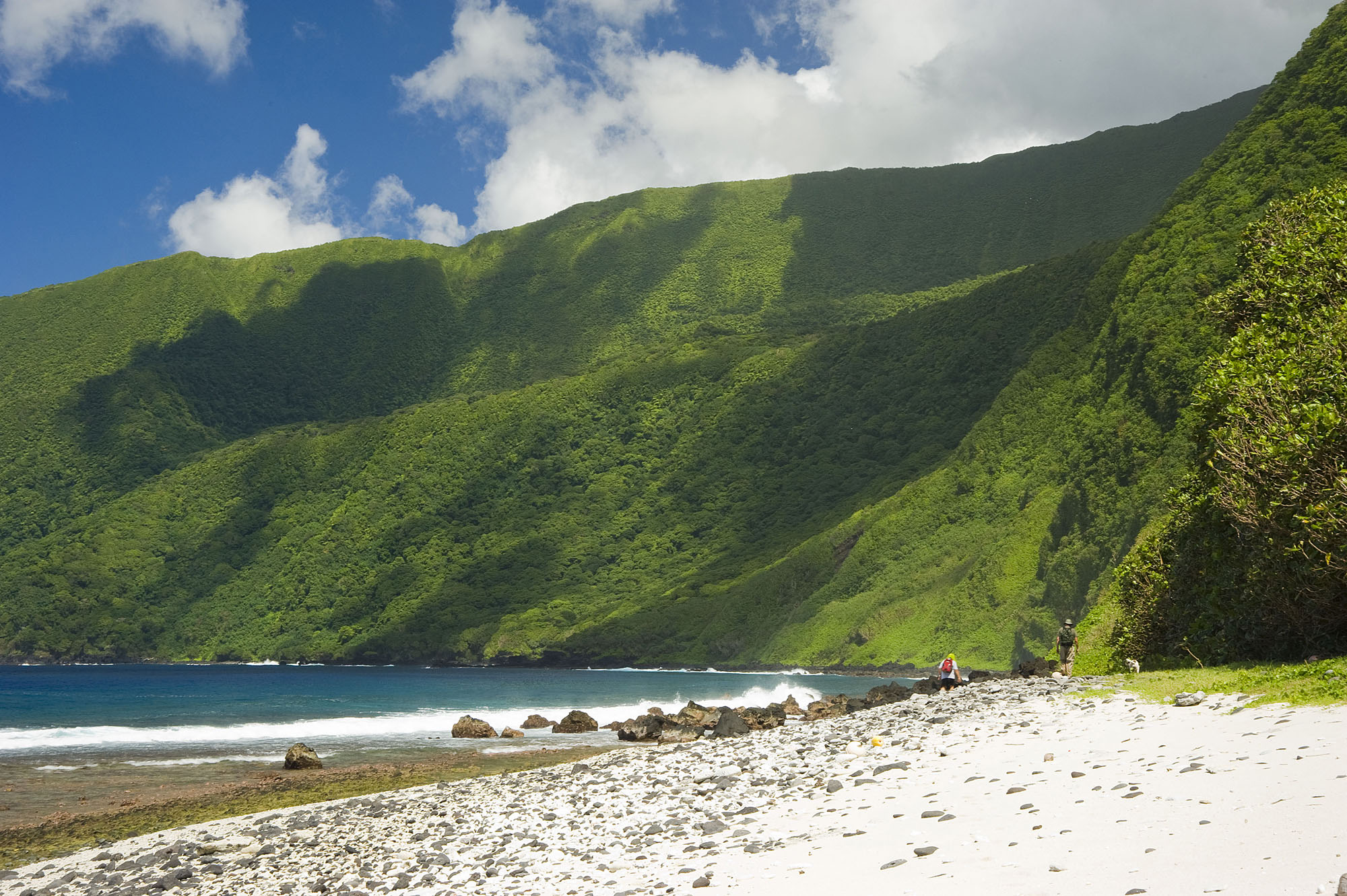
36. Lata Mountain in American Samoa

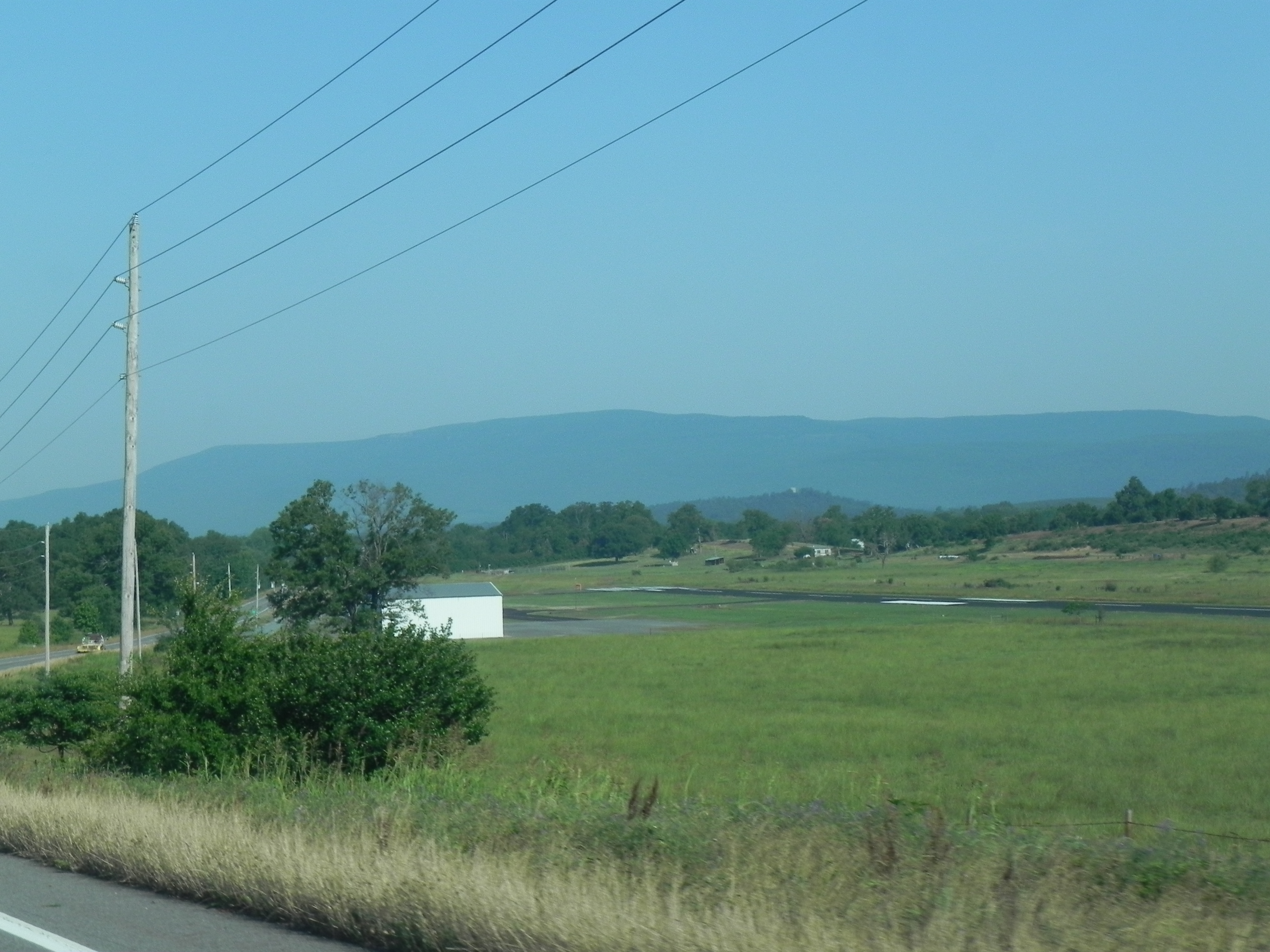
37. Mount Magazine in Arkansas

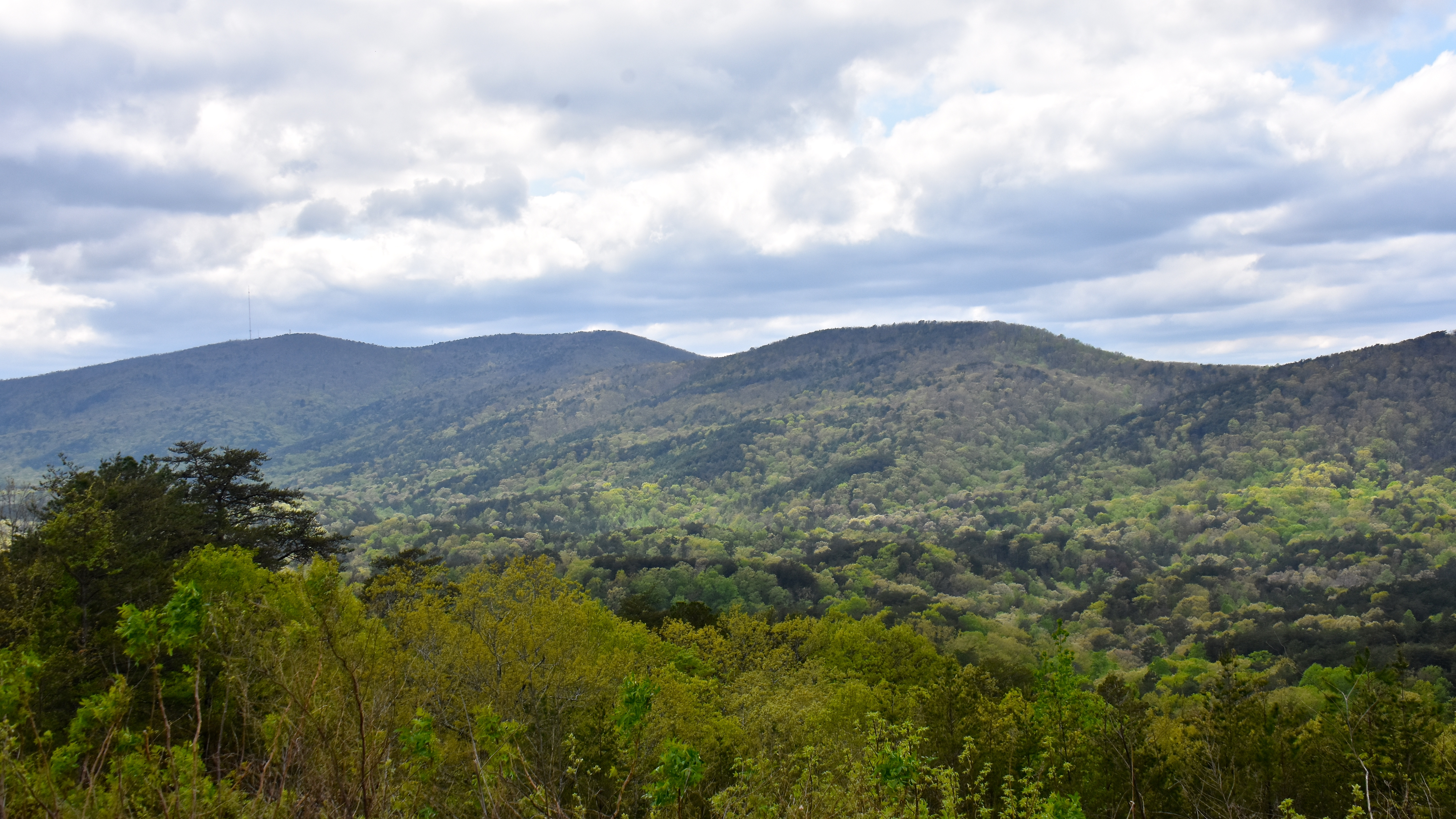
38. Cheaha Mountain in Alabama

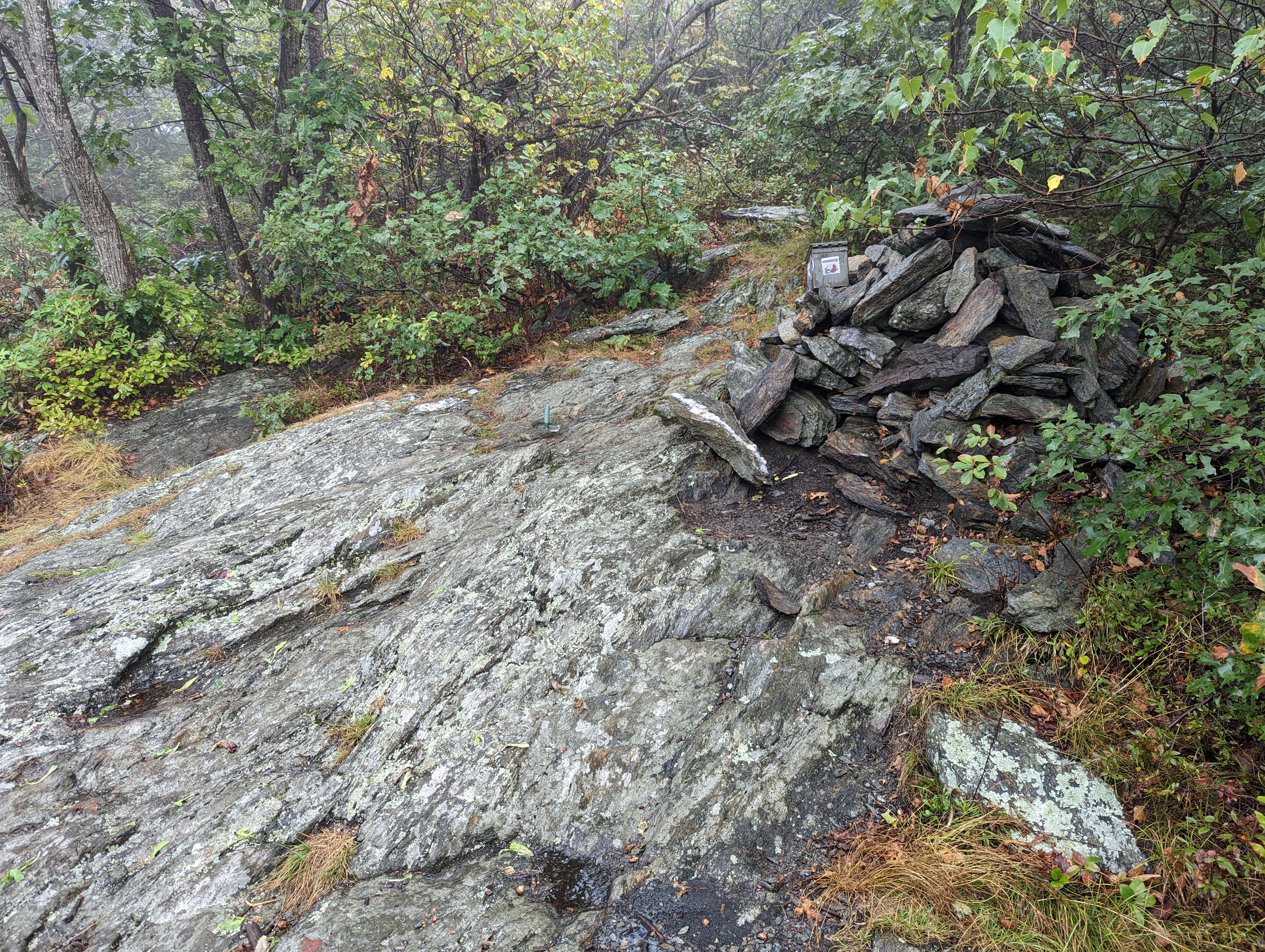
39. Southern Slope of Mount Frissell in Connecticut

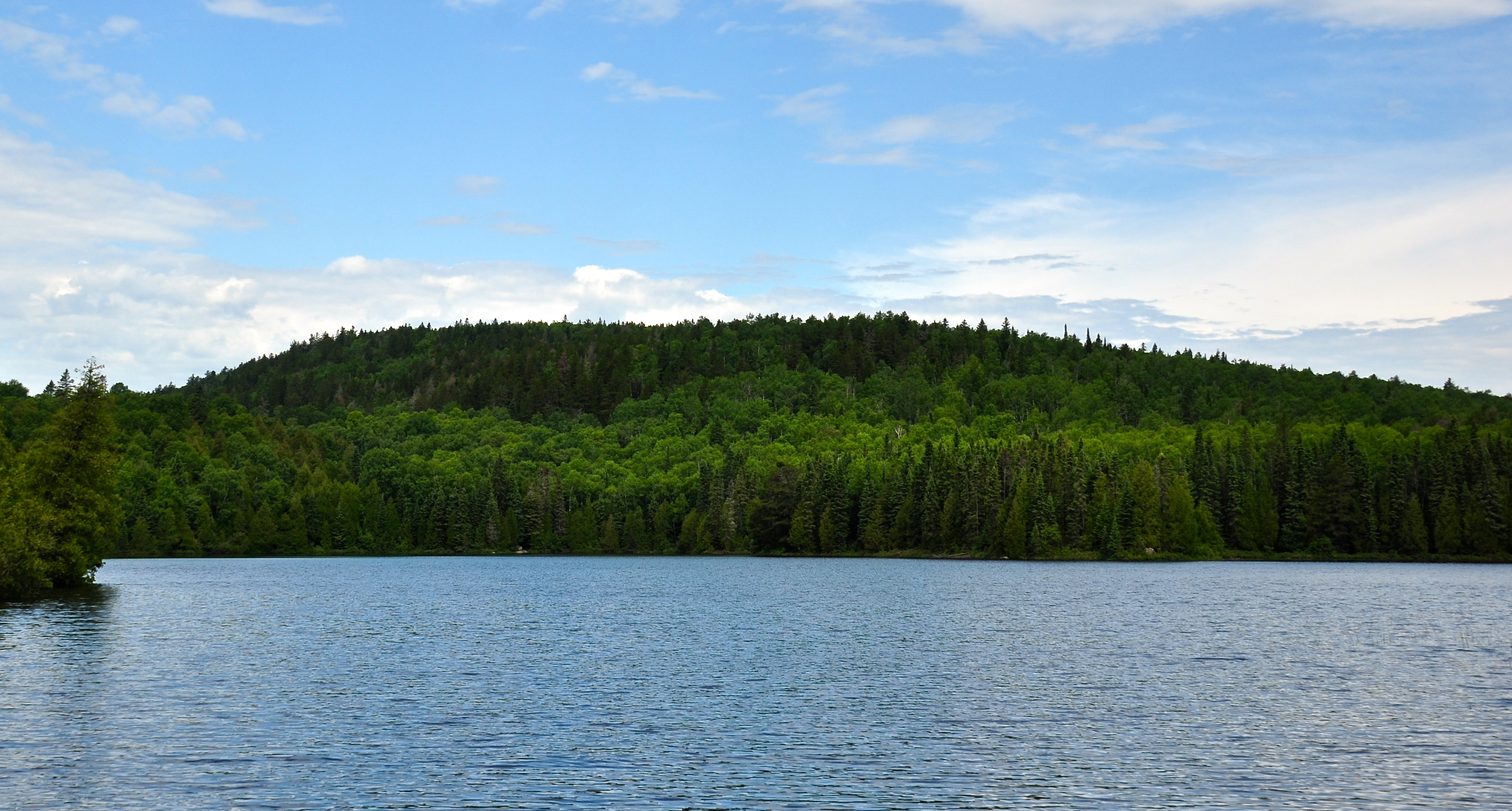
40. Eagle Mountain in Minnesota

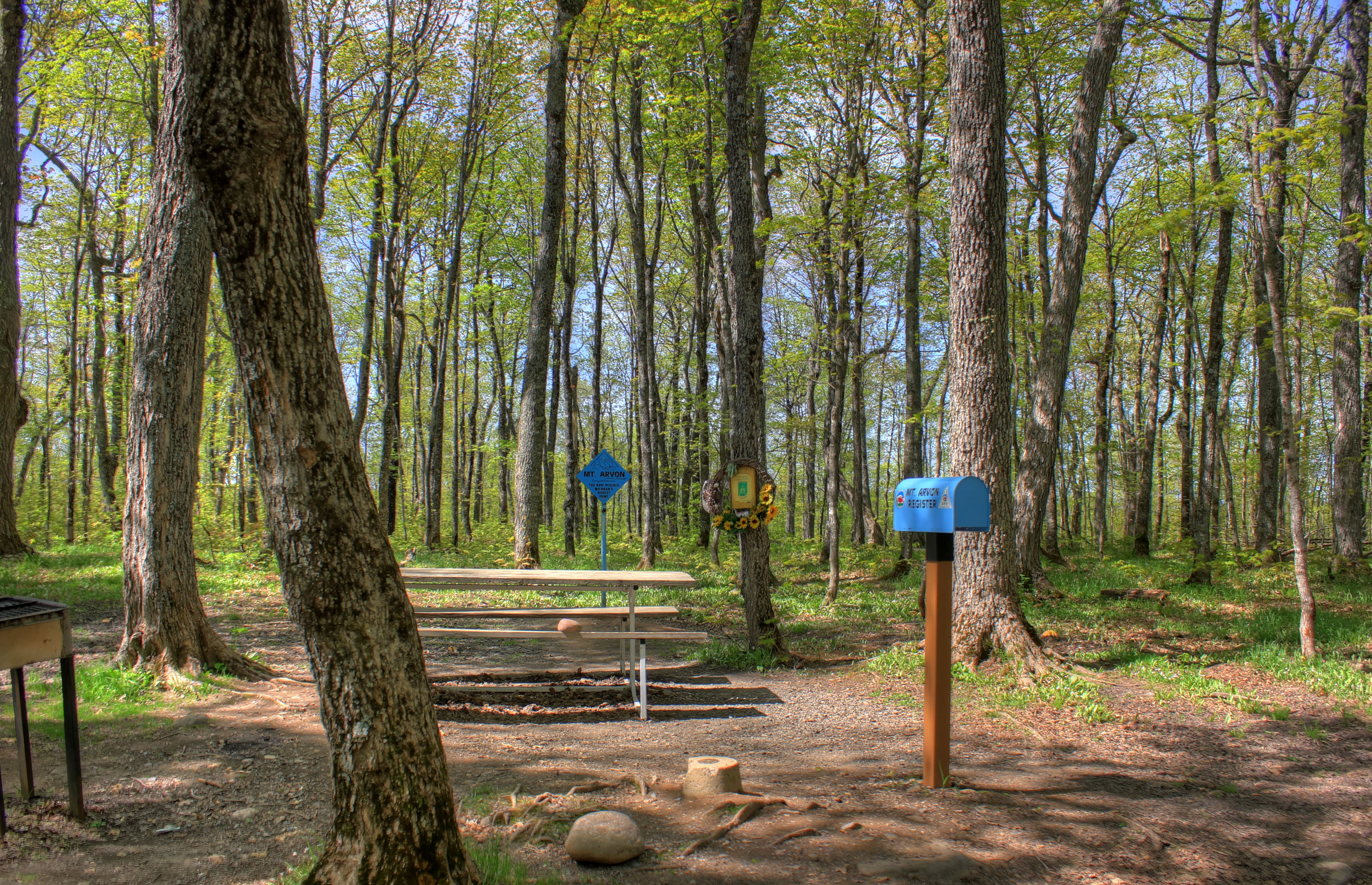
41. Mount Arvon in Michigan

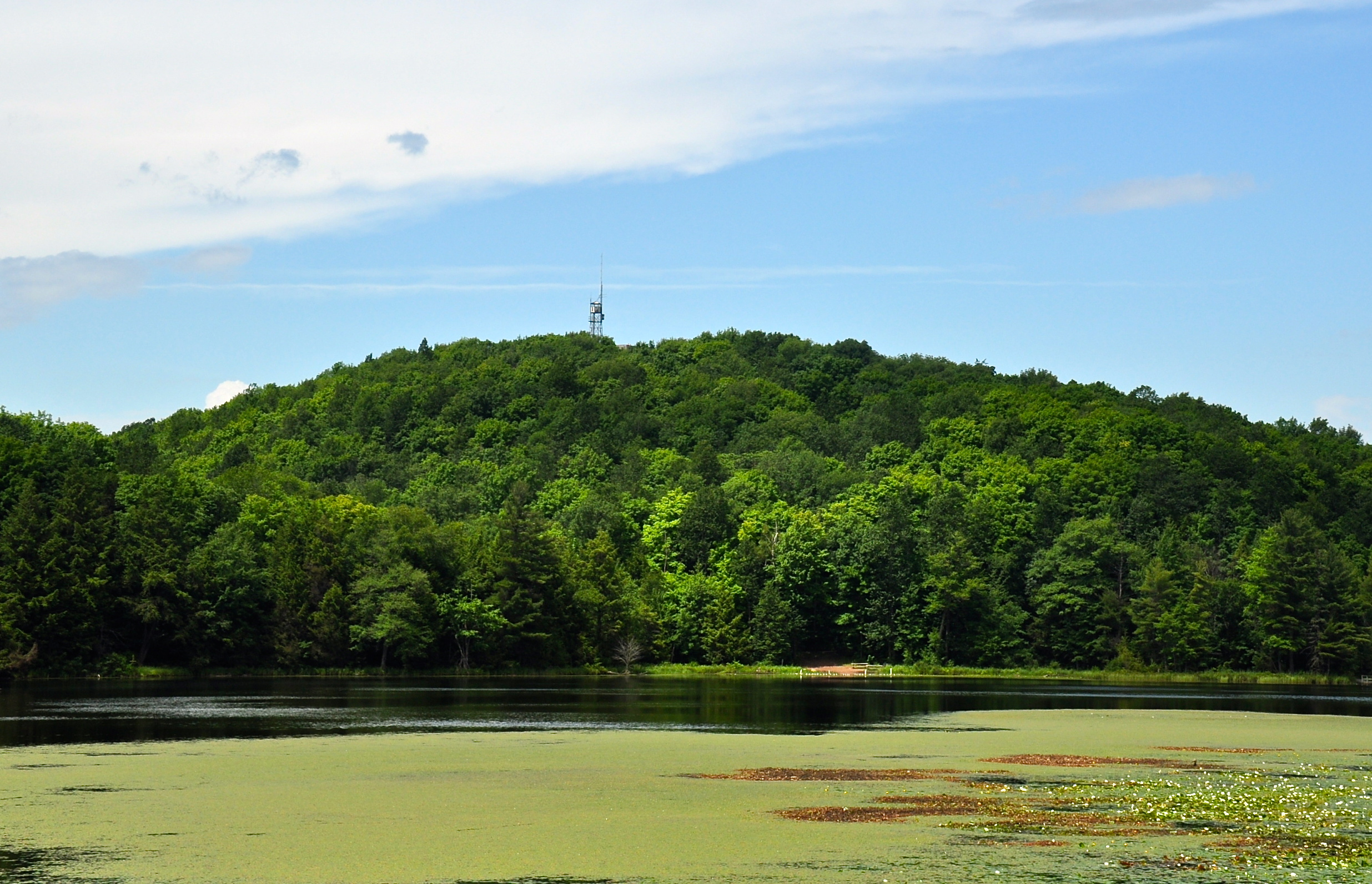
42. Timms Hill in Wisconsin

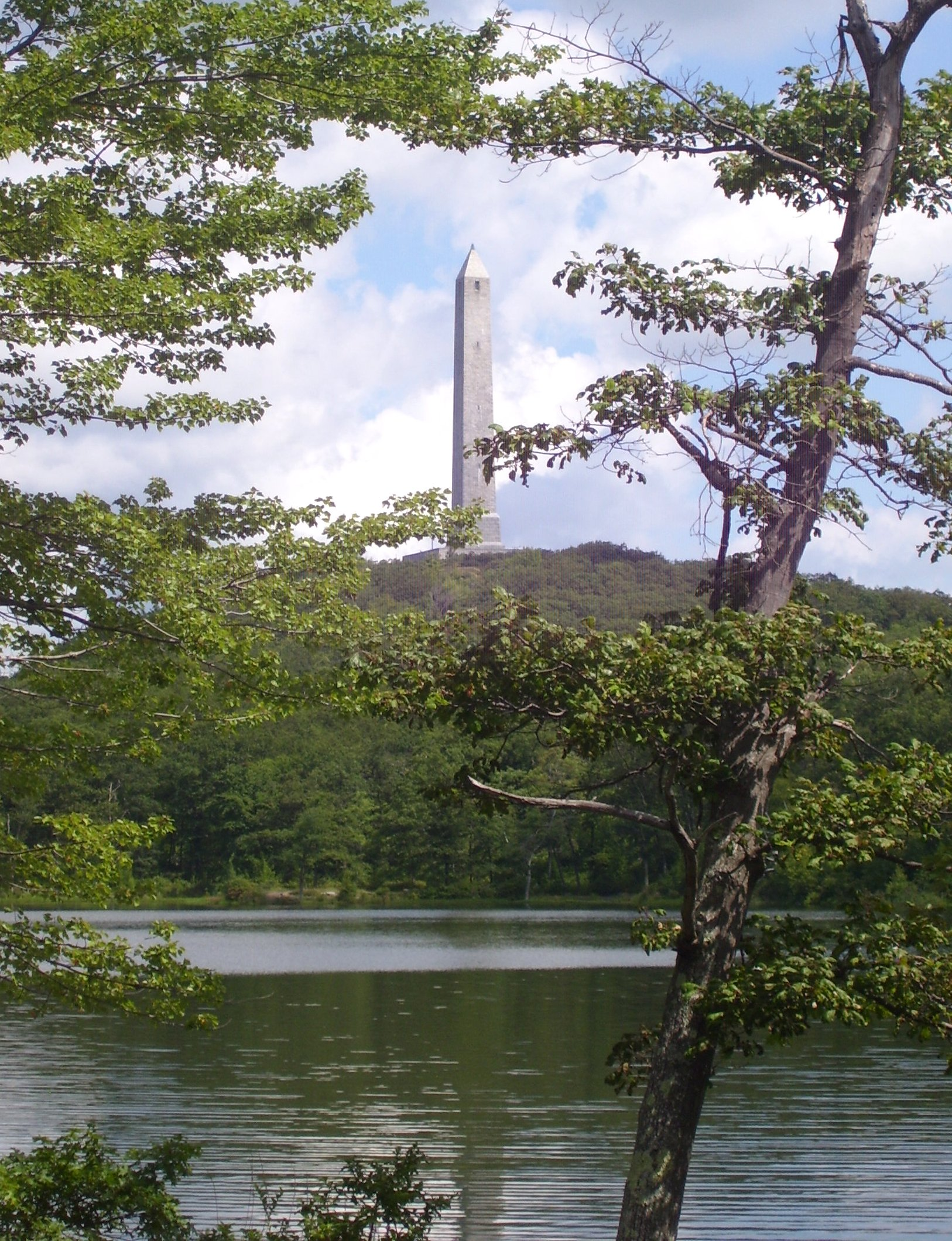
43. High Point in New Jersey

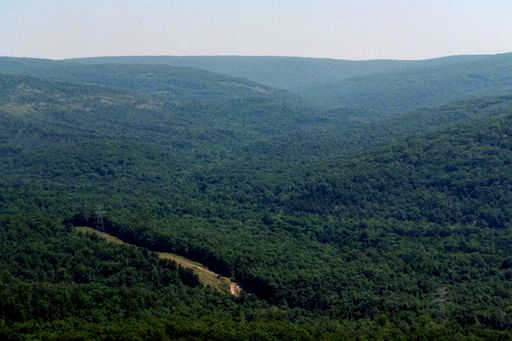
44. Taum Sauk Mountain in Missouri

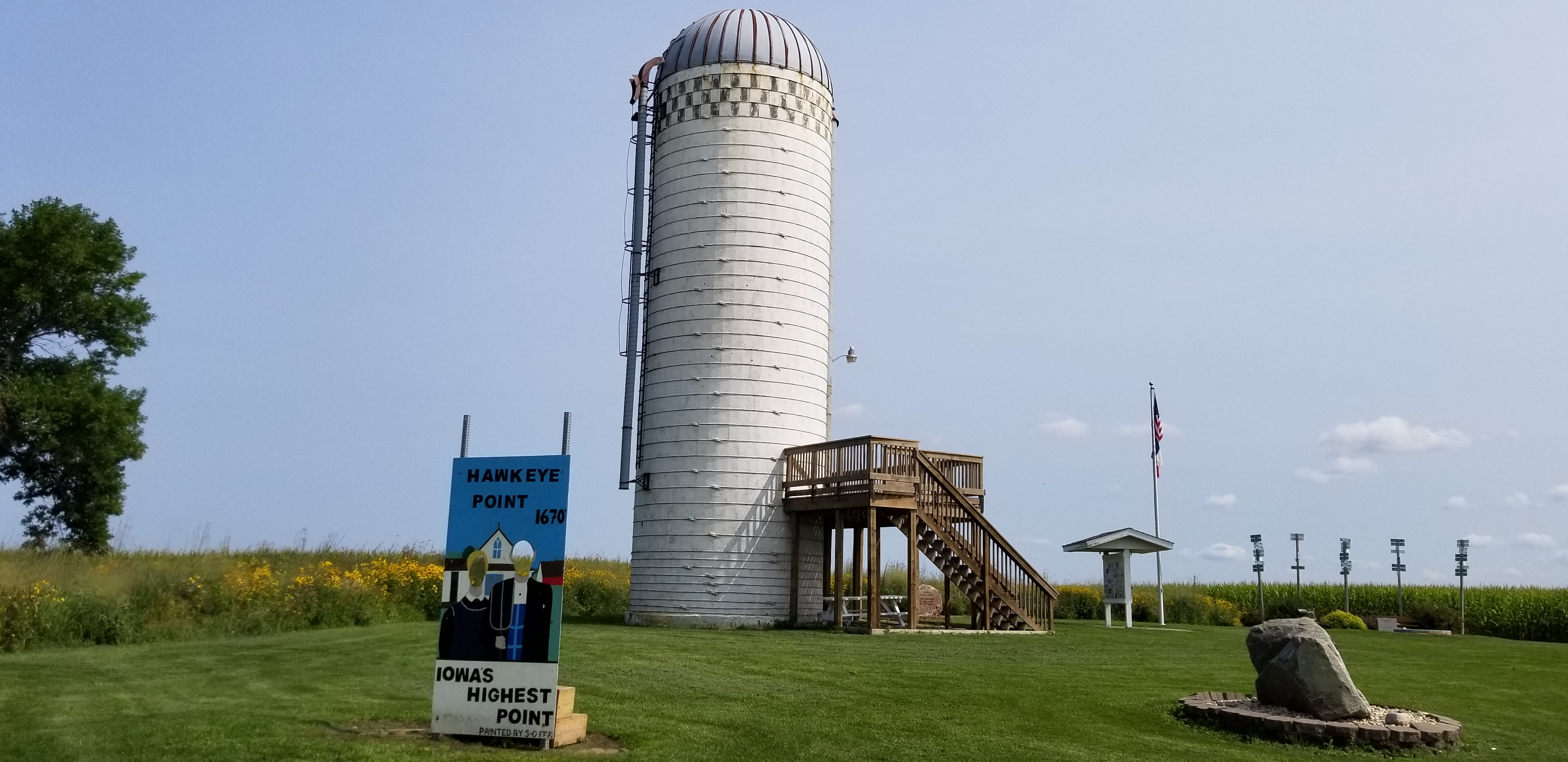
45. Hawkeye Point in Iowa

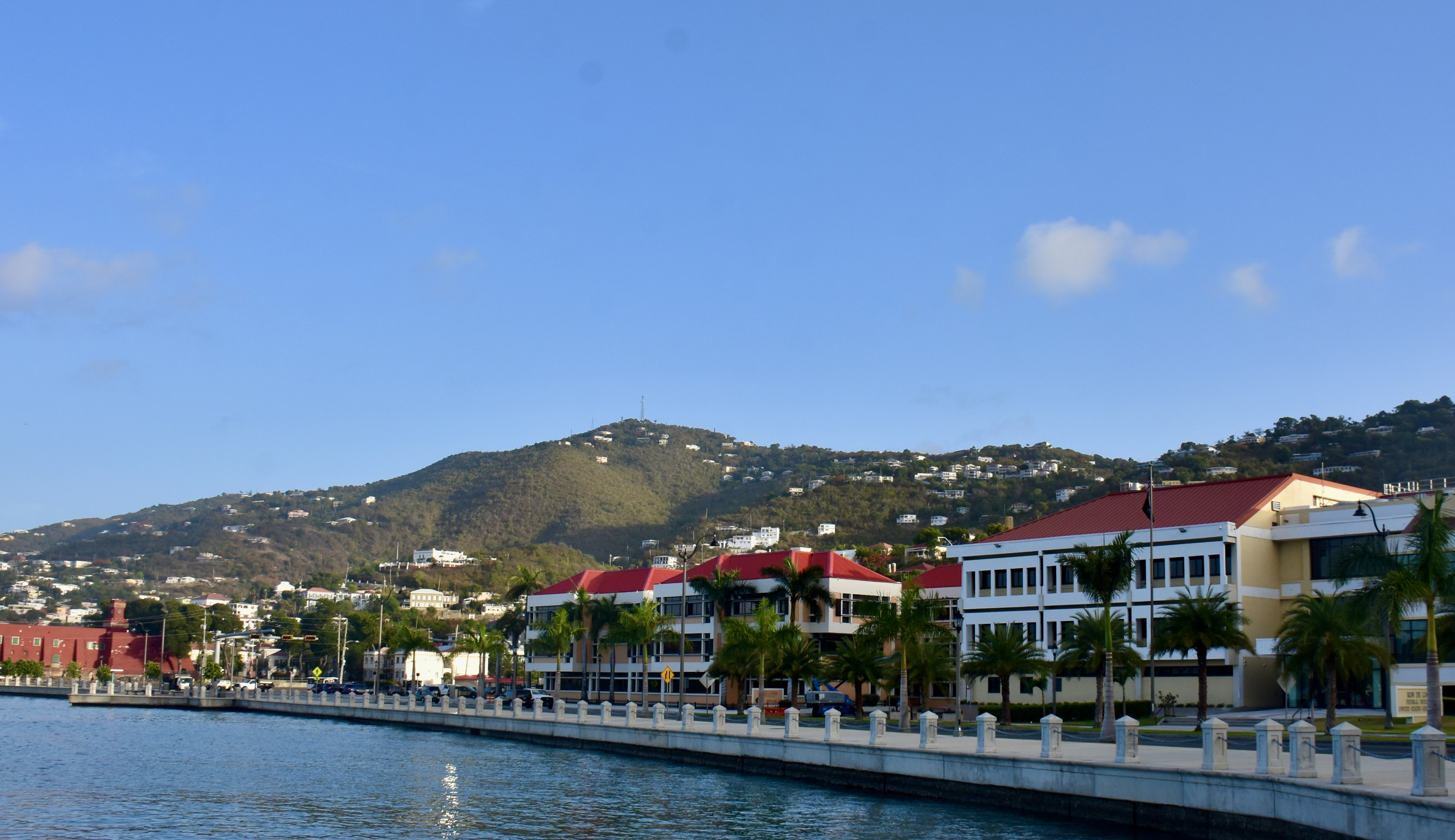
46. Crown Mountain in the US Virgin Islands

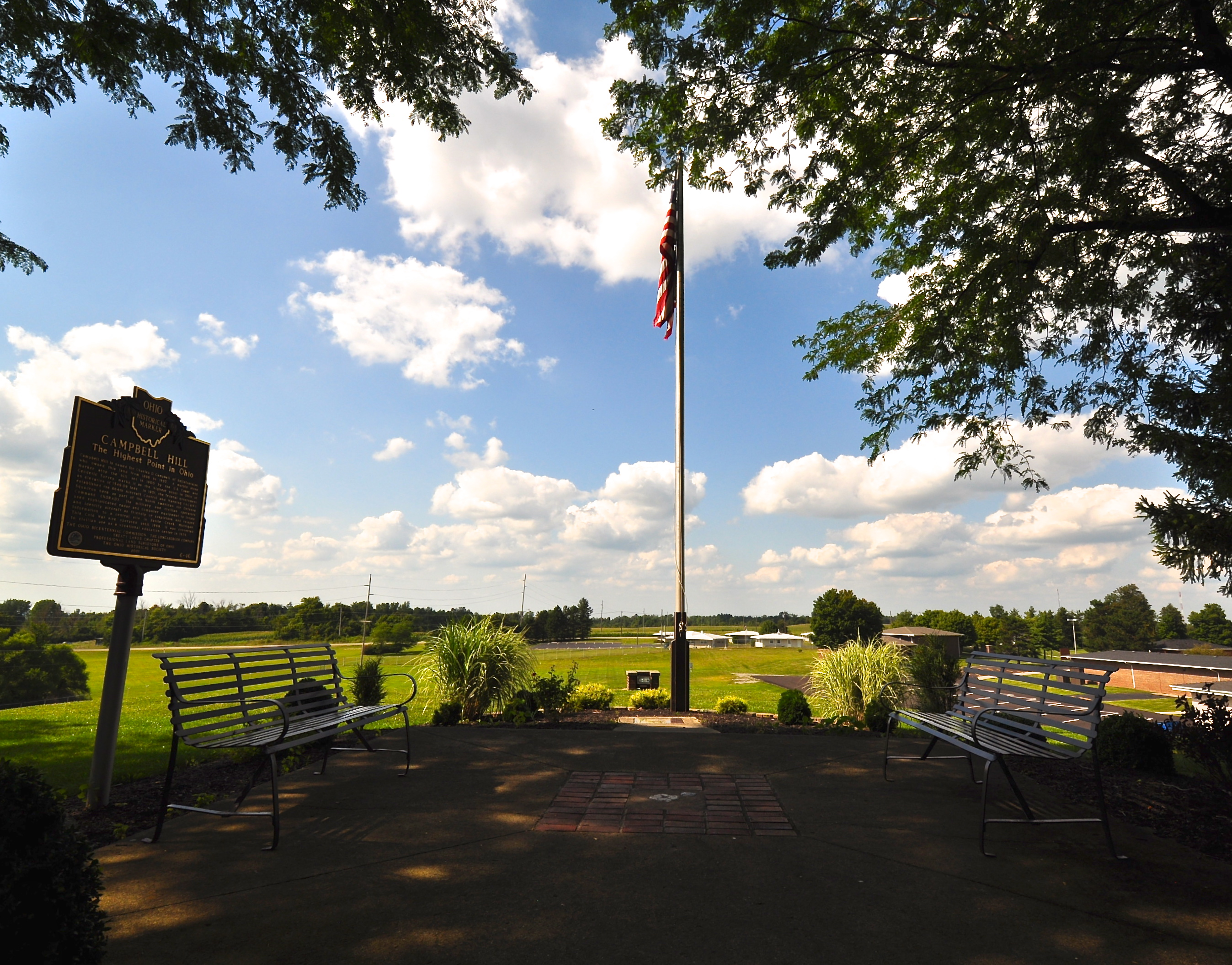
47. Campbell Hill in Ohio

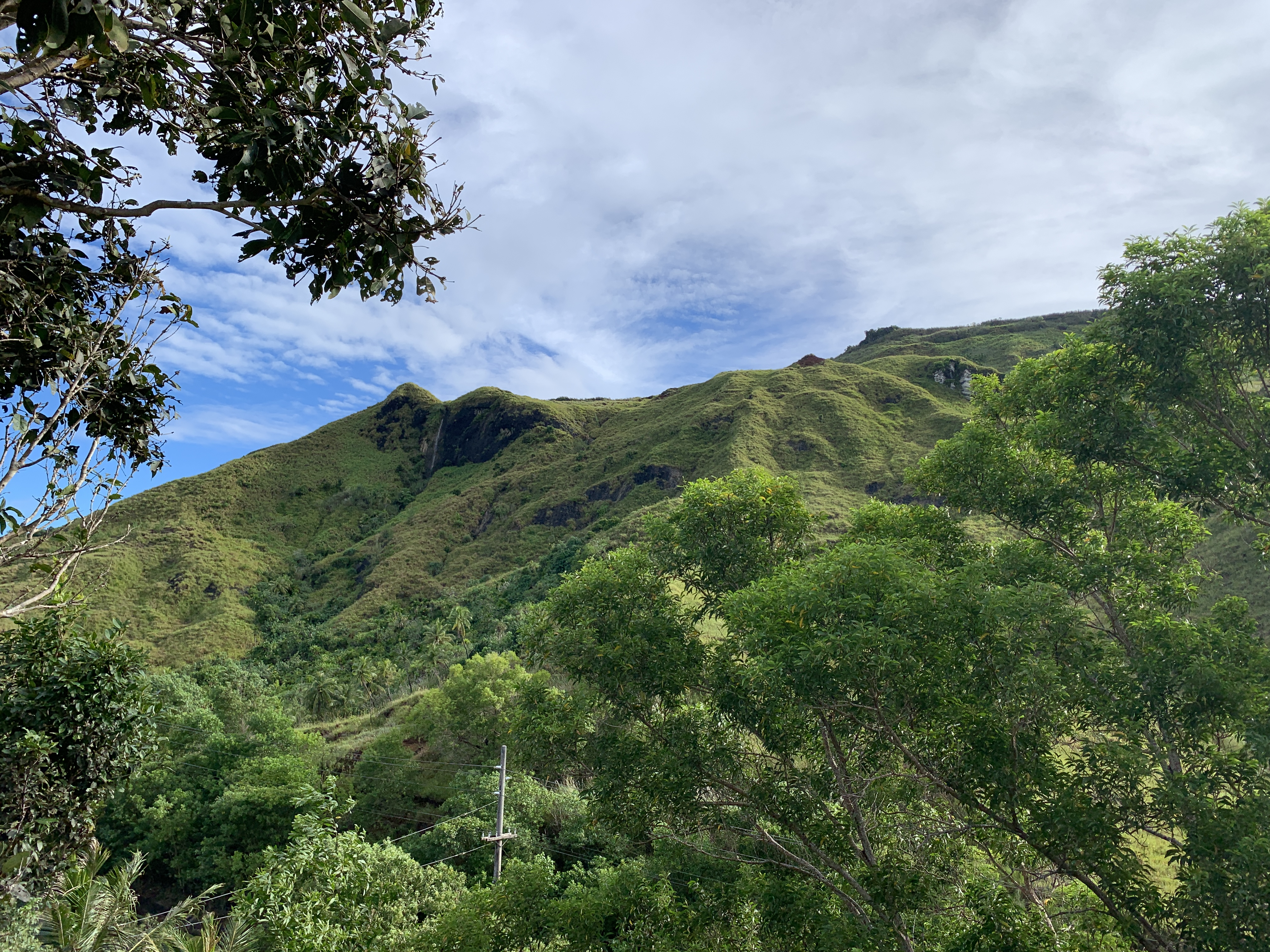
48. Mount Lamlam in Guam

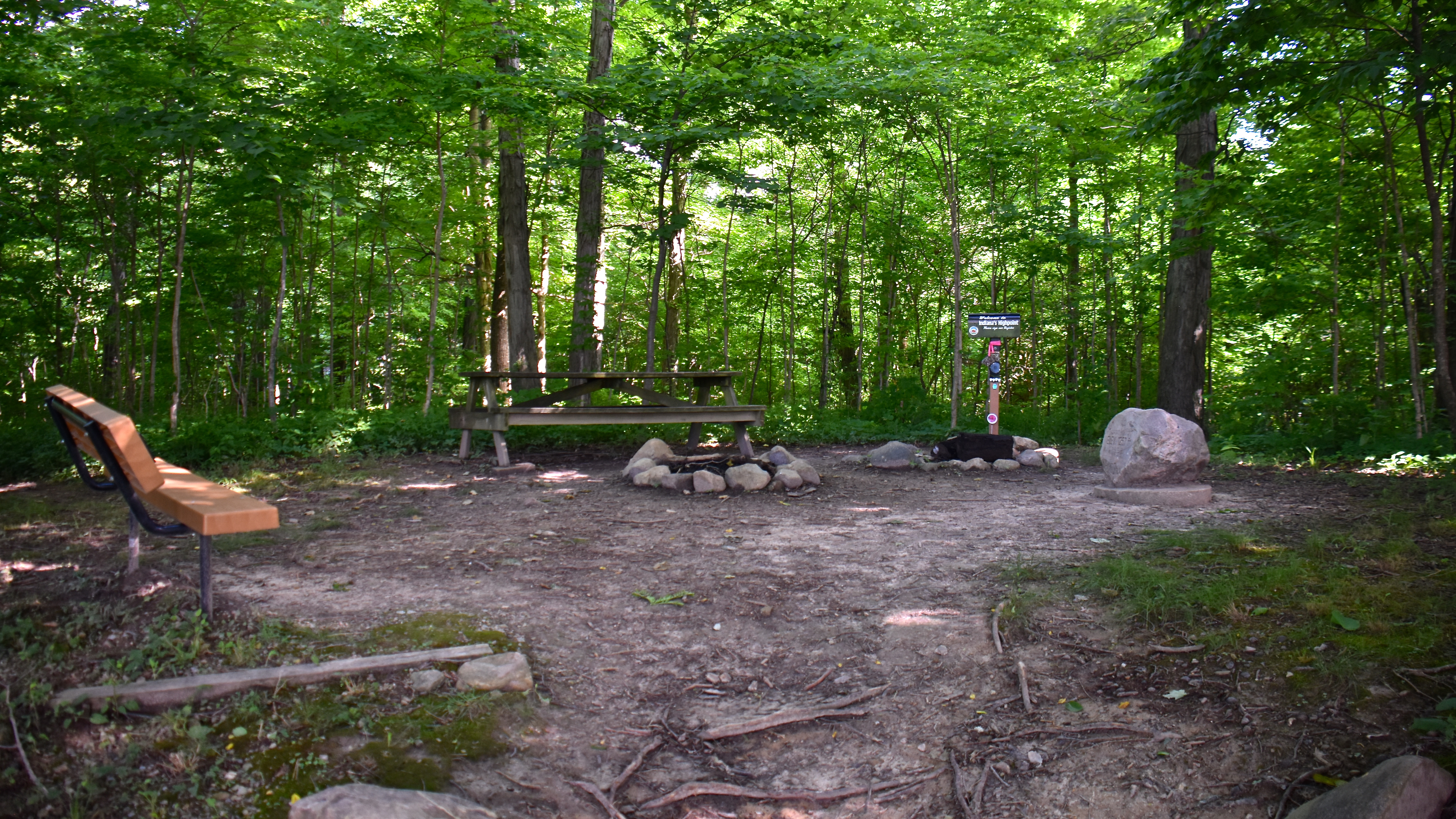
49. Hoosier Hill in Indiana

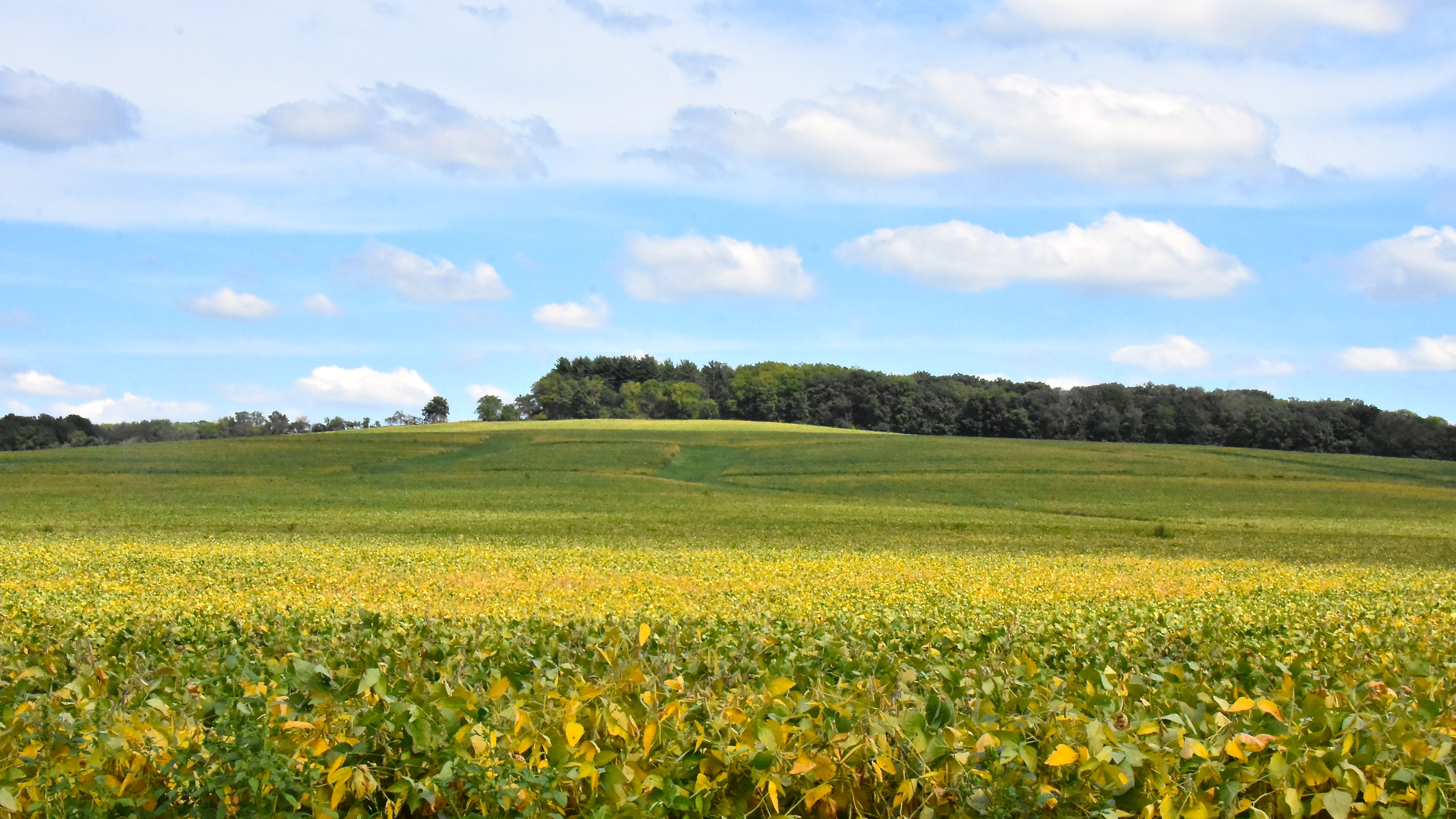
50. Charles Mound in Illinois

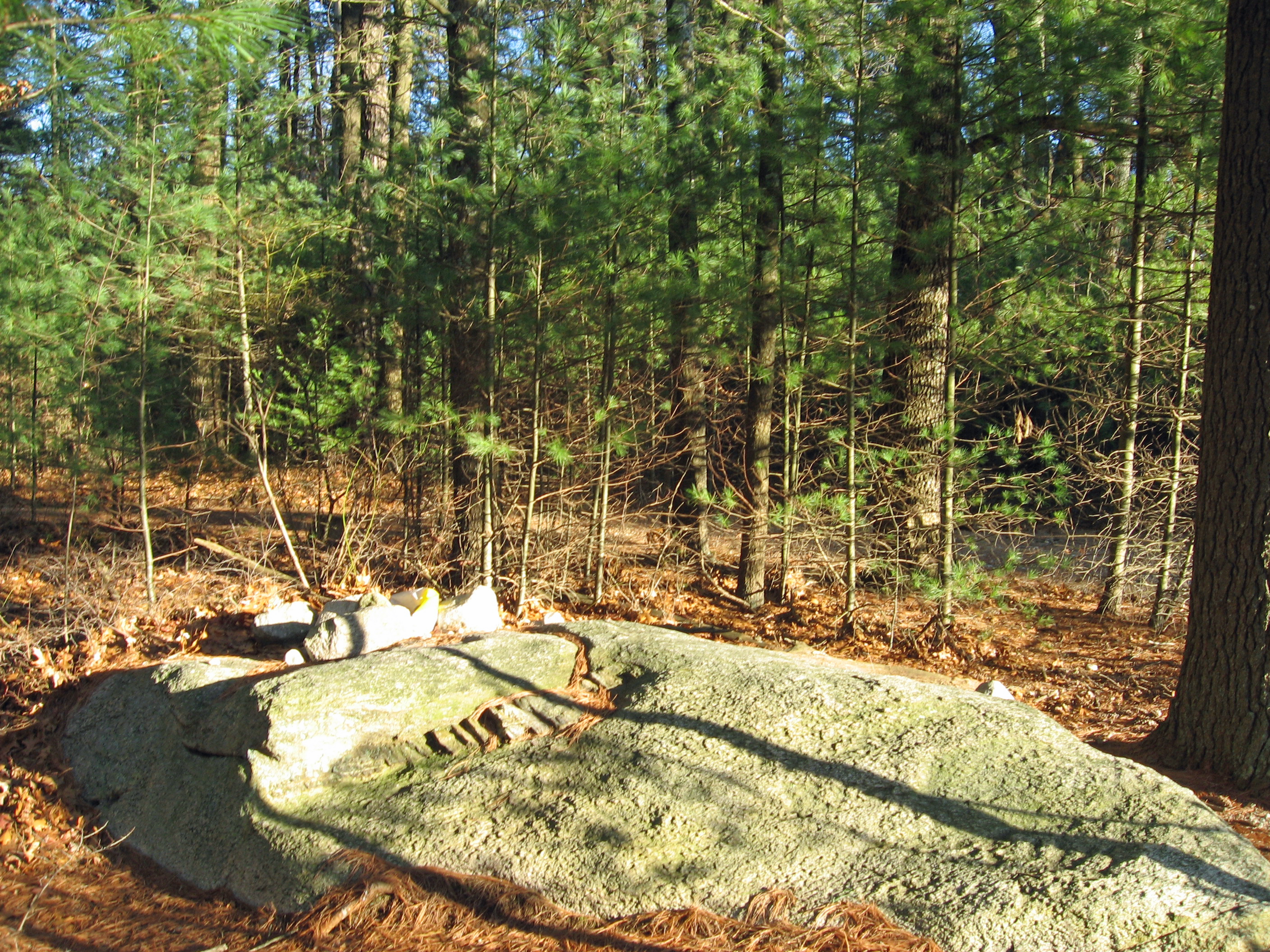
51. Jerimoth Hill in Rhode Island

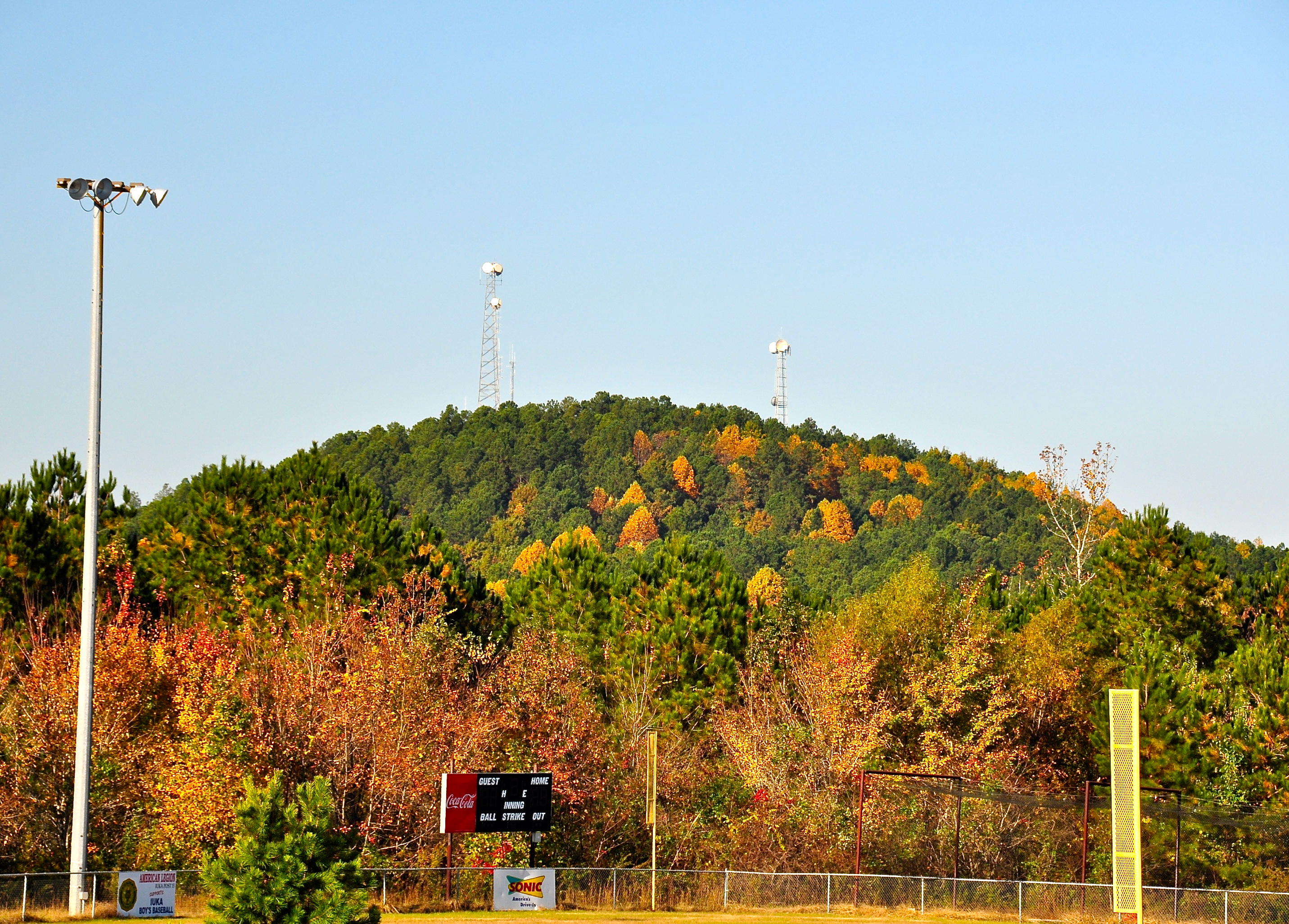
52. Woodall Mountain in Mississippi

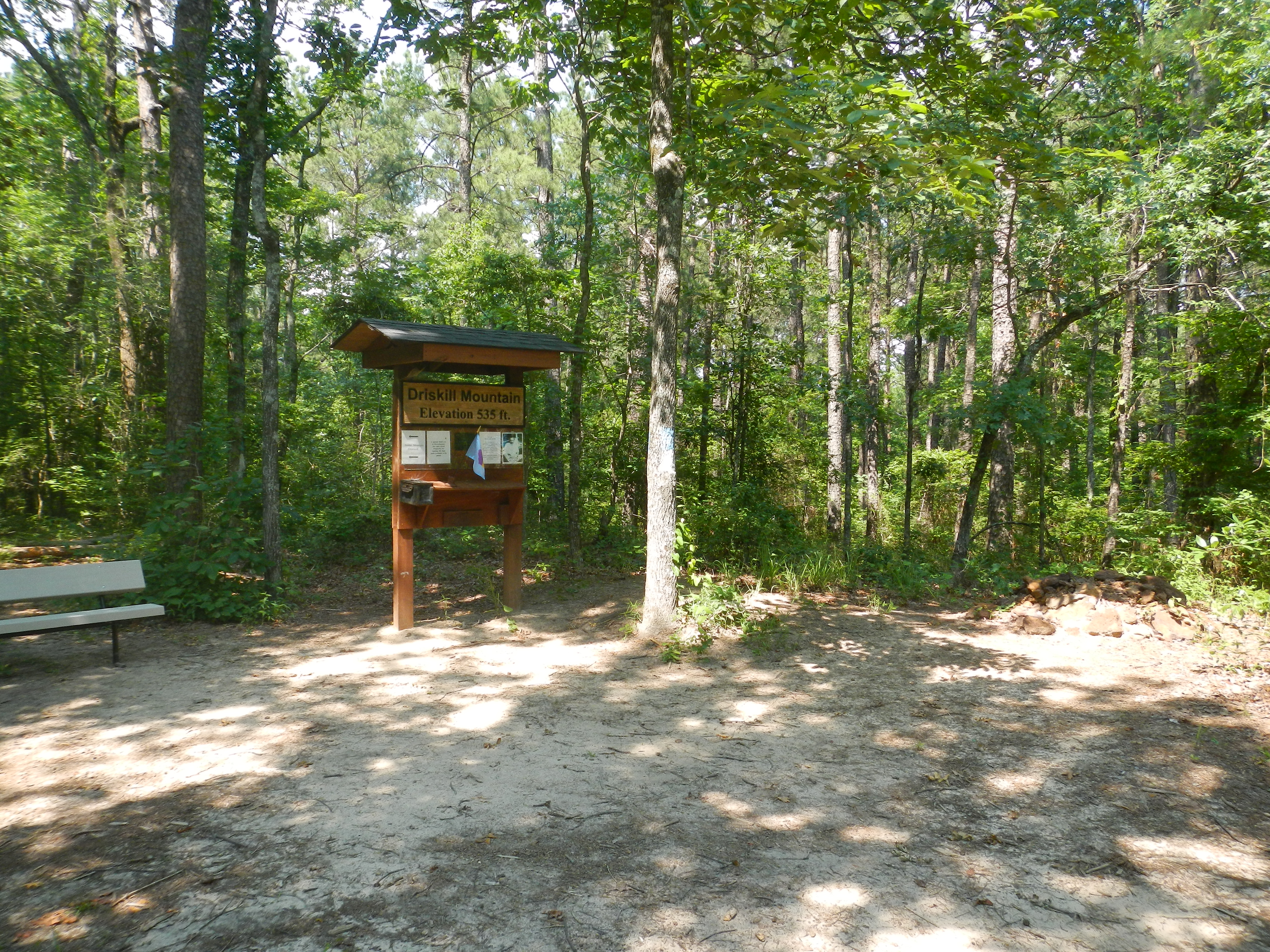
53. Driskill Mountain in Louisiana

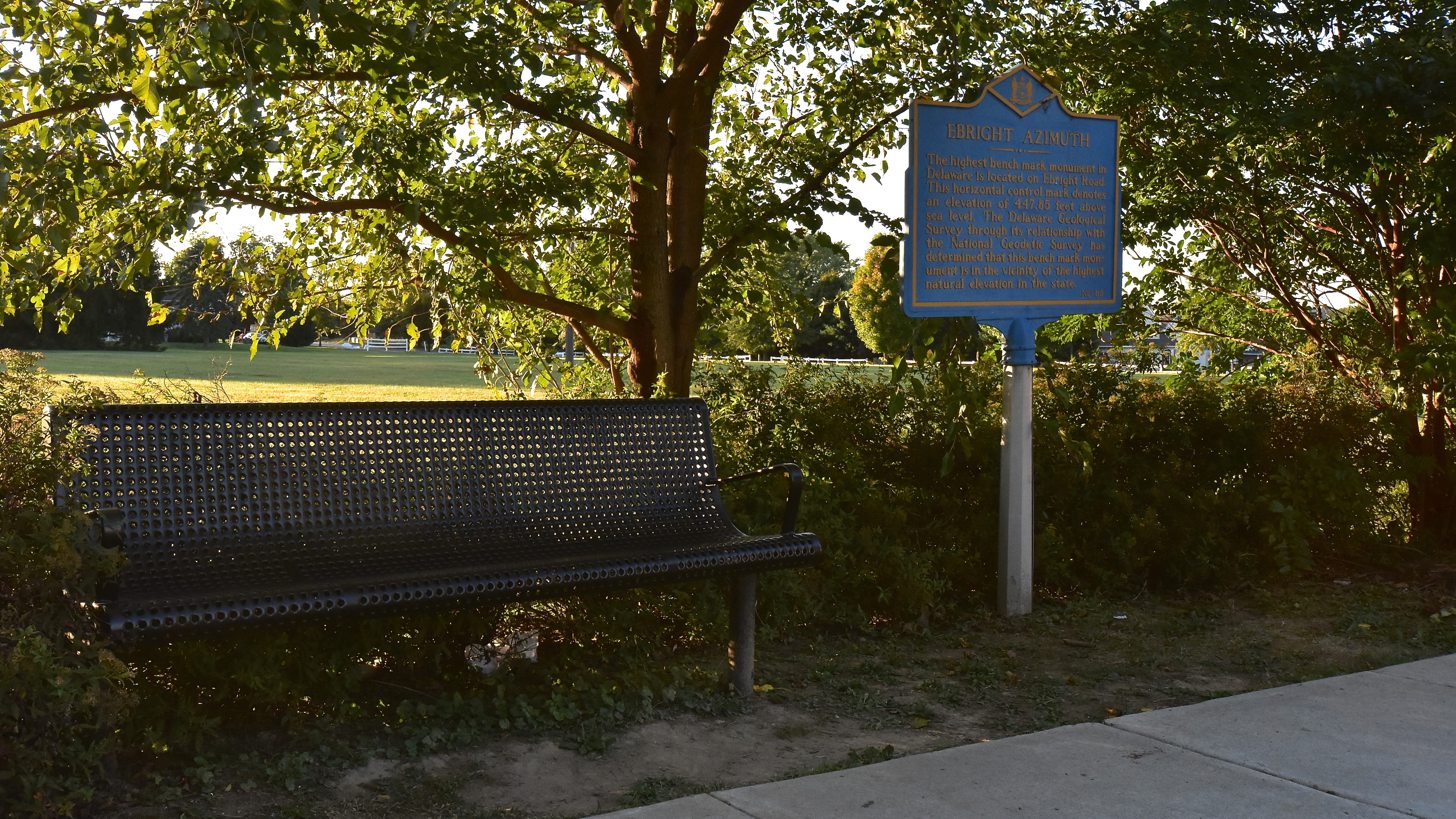
54. Ebright Azimuth in Delaware

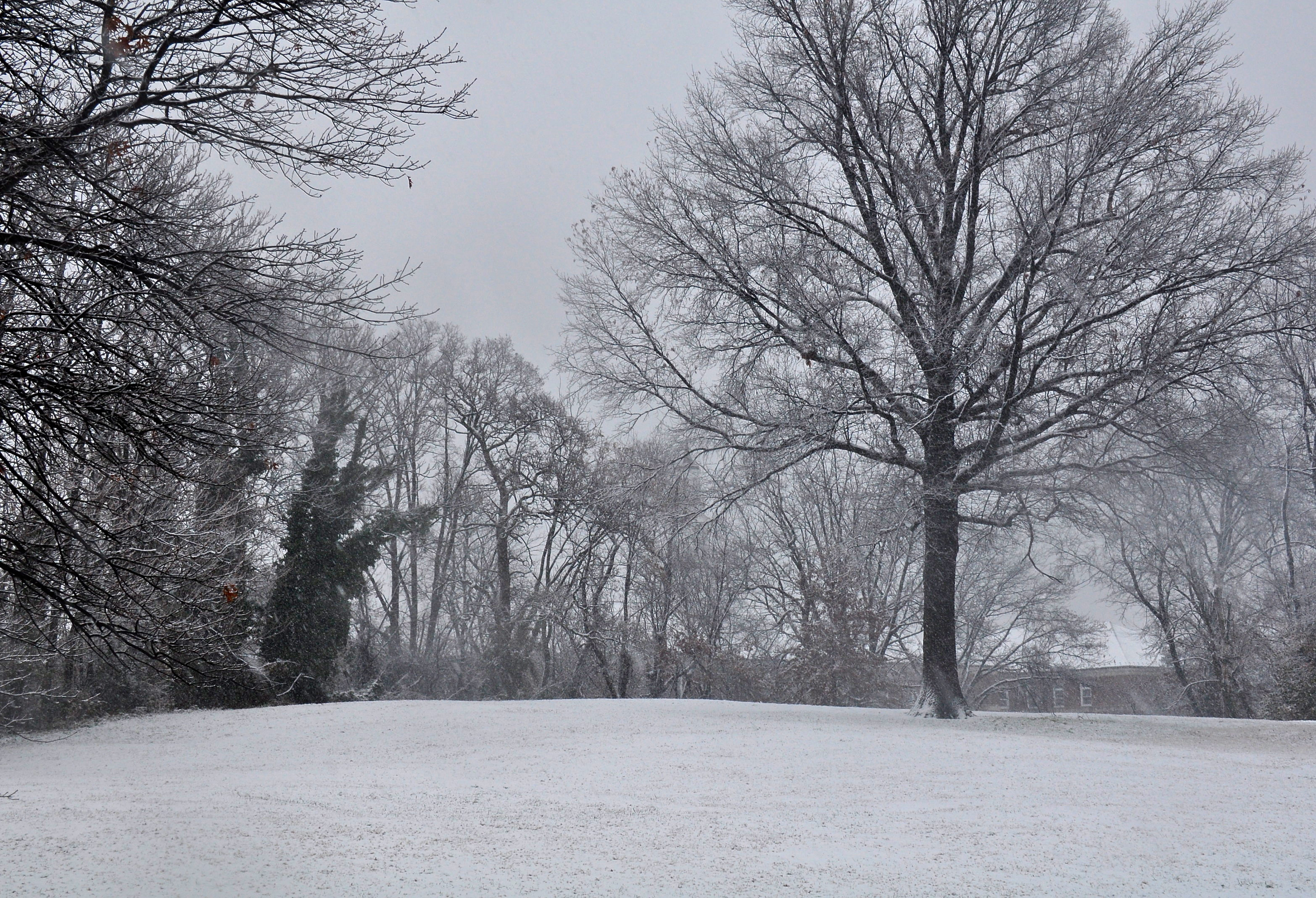
55. Point Reno in the District of Columbia

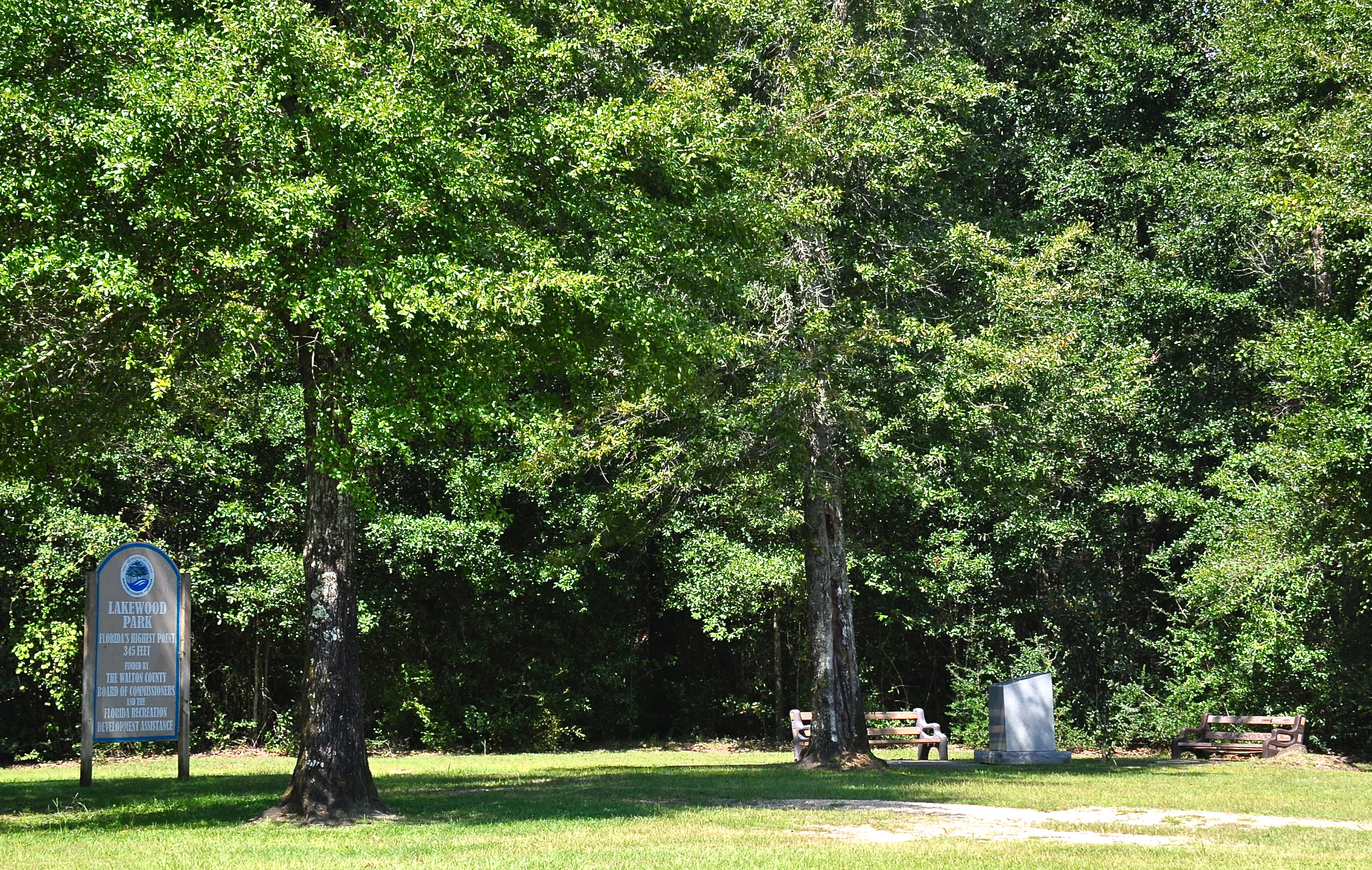
56. Britton Hill in Florida

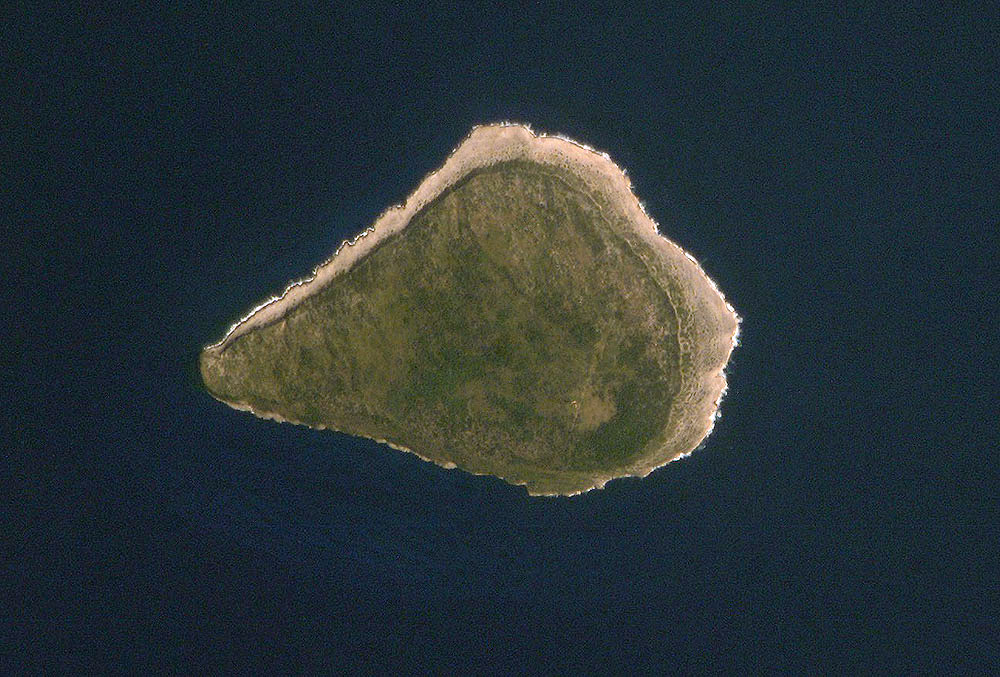
57. The highest point of Navassa Island is the highest point of all the US Minor Outlying Islands.

== Lowpoint gallery ==
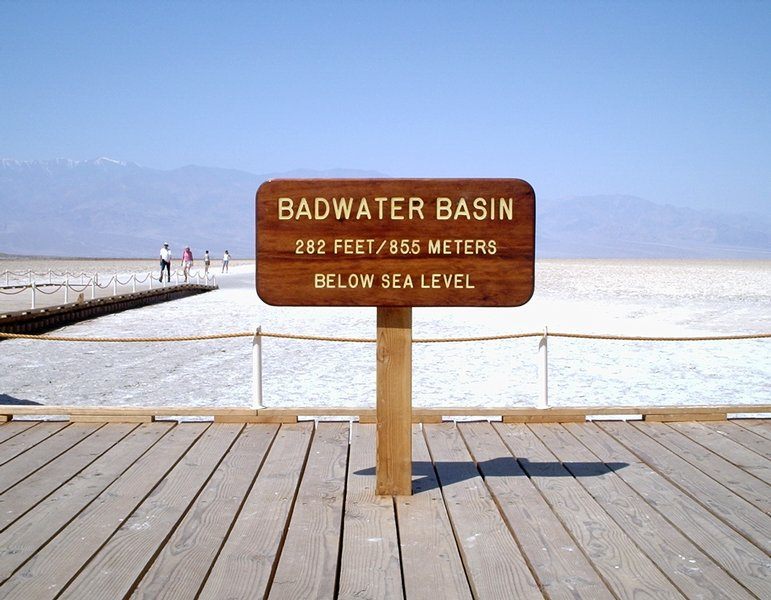
The Badwater Basin in Death Valley is the lowest point in California, the United States, and all of North America.

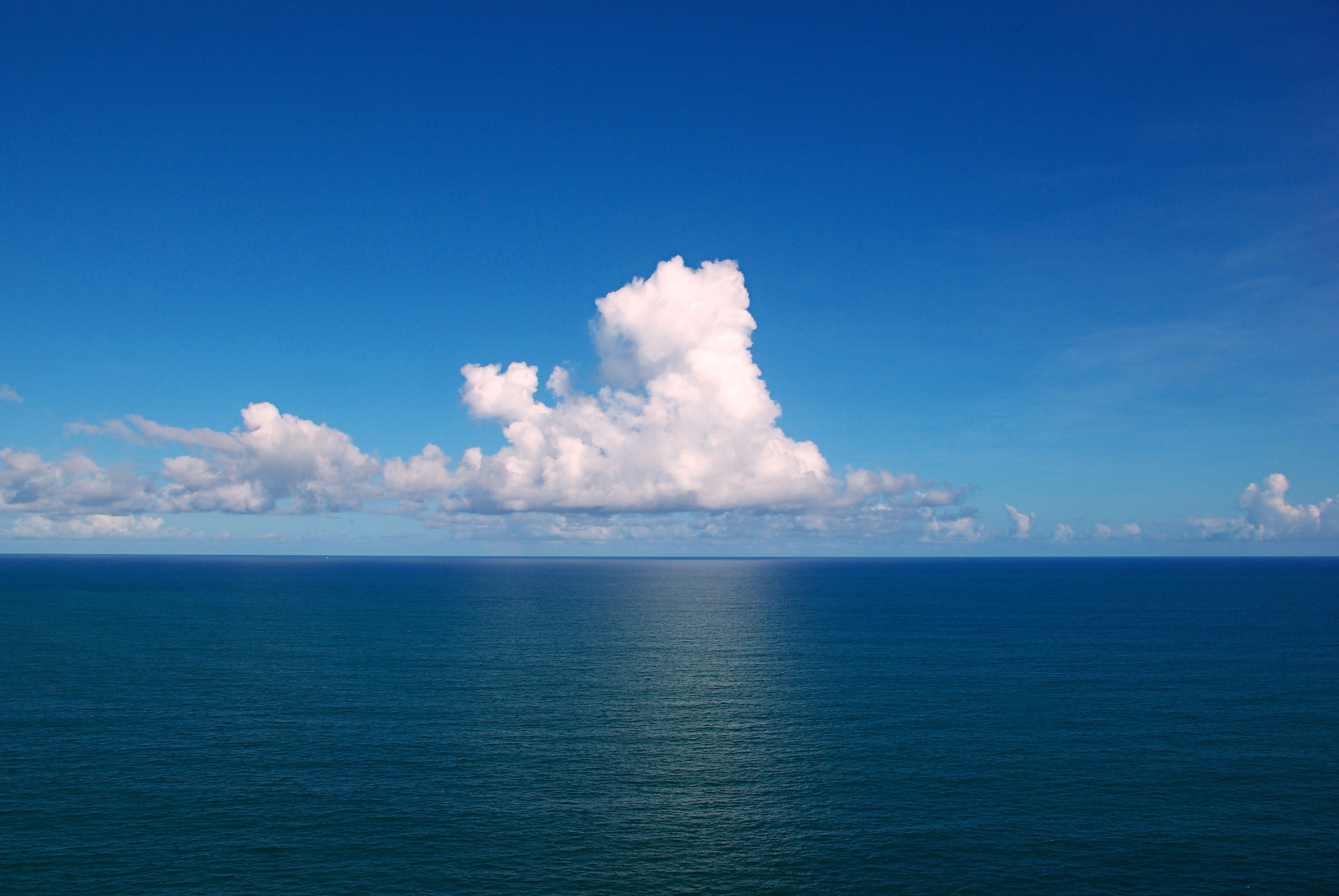
The lowpoints of Alabama, Alaska, American Samoa, Connecticut, Delaware, Florida, Georgia, Guam, Hawaii, Maine, Maryland, Massachusetts, Mississippi, New Hampshire, New Jersey, New York, North Carolina, the Northern Mariana Islands, Oregon, Pennsylvania, Puerto Rico, Rhode Island, South Carolina, Texas, the US Virgin Islands, Virginia, Washington, and the US Minor Outlying Islands are all at sea level.

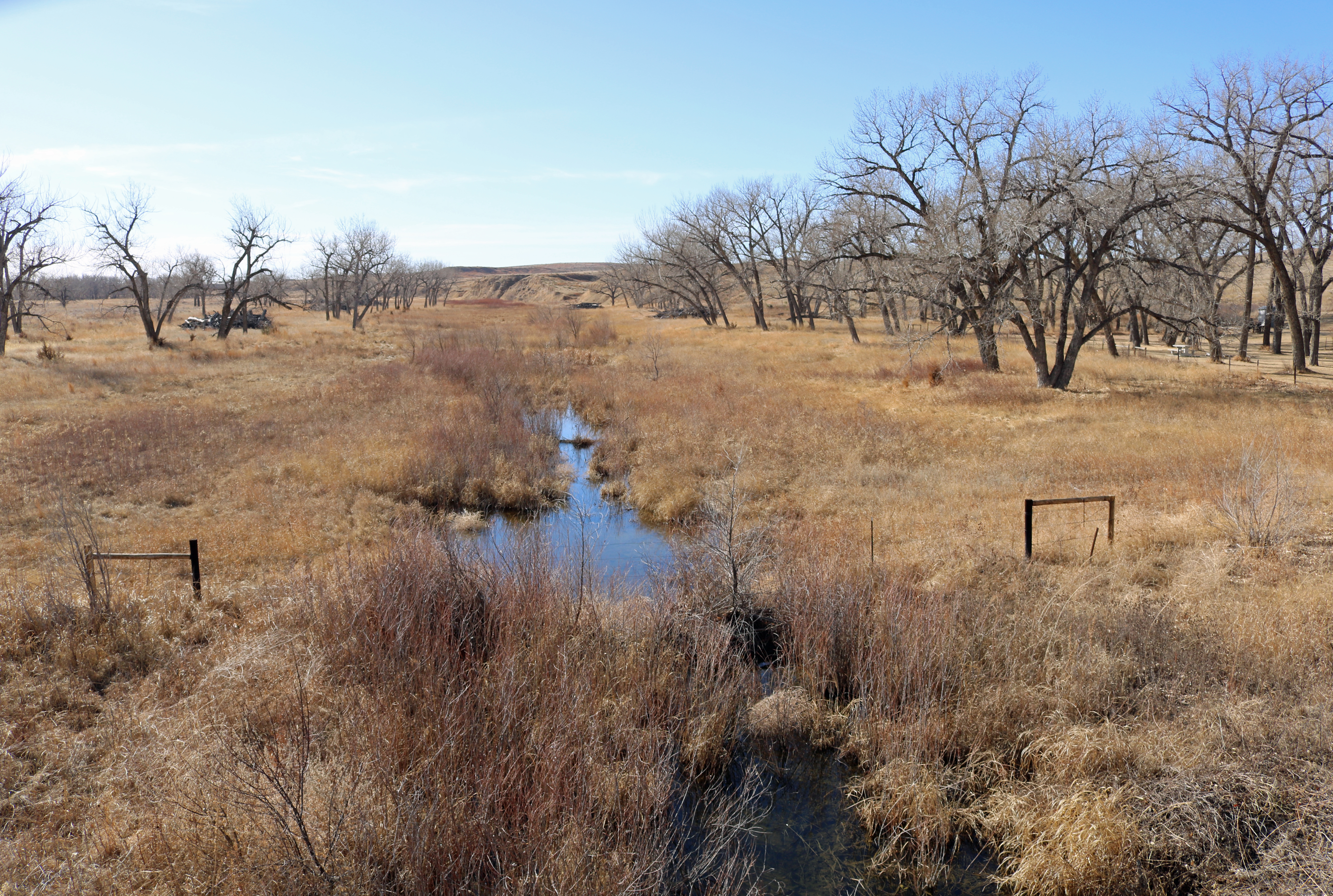
The Arikaree River at the Colorado-Kansas border is the lowest point in Colorado, and the highest state lowpoint in the United States.

== See also ==
- Highpointing
- List of elevation extremes by country
- List of elevation extremes by region
- Lists of highest points
  - List of highest U.S. county high points
  - List of mountain peaks of the United States
    - List of the highest major summits of the United States
    - List of the most prominent summits of the United States
    - List of the most isolated major summits of the United States
- List of highest counties in the United States
- List of highest United States cities by state
