= List of Florida's highest points =

This list of Florida's highest points in the state of Florida includes natural and manmade points.

Most of the state's highest named points are in Holmes, Walton, and Washington counties, in the sub-Piedmont highlands of northern Florida. The highest points in peninsular Florida are found along the Lake Wales Ridge, running through the central portion of the peninsula, and the Brooksville Ridge, which parallels the northwestern coast of the peninsula.

Geographic points (permanent earthworks) of human origin are also included, designated as "N/A, Artificial".

#	Point	Elevation (ft)	Range/Region	County	Geographic Coordinates
1	Britton Hill	345 feet (105 m)	Northern Highlands of Florida	Walton County	30°59′18″N 86°16′55″W
2	Oak Hill	331	Northern Highlands of Florida	Washington County	30°41′46″N 85°27′51″W
3	High Hill	323	Northern Highlands of Florida	Washington County	30°43′53″N 85°29′07″W
4	Falling Waters Hill	318	Northern Highlands of Florida	Washington County	30°43′53″N 85°32′06″W
5	Sugarloaf Mountain	312	Lake Wales Ridge	Lake County	28°38′58″N 81°43′59″W
6	Camp Lake South	310	Lake Wales Ridge	Lake County	28°35′55″N 81°43′46″W
7	Unnamed Peak east of Jacks Lake	307	Lake Wales Ridge	Lake County	28°33′22″N 81°43′06″W
8	Danley Hill	305	Northern Highlands of Florida	Walton County	30°58′25″N 86°11′46″W
9	Clay Hill (Pasco County High Point)	301	Brooksville Ridge	Pasco County	28°25′38″N 82°15′42″W
10	Crooked Lake Sandhill	300+	Lake Wales Ridge	Polk County	27°48′32″N 81°32′18″W
11	Unnamed peak east of Shepherd Lake	300+	Lake Wales Ridge	Lake County	28°37′38″N 81°43′47″W
12	Orange Hill	300+	Northern Highlands of Florida	Washington County	30°40′26″N 85°30′34″W
13	Iron Mountain	295	Lake Wales Ridge	Polk County	27°56′09″N 81°34′38″W
14	Mount Pleasant	295	Northern Highlands of Florida	Gadsden County	30°39′25″N 84°41′28″W
15	Sandy Mountain	295	Northern Highlands of Florida	Walton County	30°39′45″N 86°17′02″W
16	Mud Hill	285	Northern Highlands of Florida	Washington County	30°37′05″N 85°37′13″W
17	Hudson Hill	282	Northern Highlands of Florida	Holmes County	30°51′28″N 85°56′19″W
18	Sexton Hill	282	Northern Highlands of Florida	Washington County	30°36′40″N 85°34′12″W
19	Griffin Hill	280	Northern Highlands of Florida	Holmes County	30°52′04″N 85°57′11″W
20	Unnamed Hill	279	Red Hills Region	Leon County	30°35′58″N 84°18′14″W
21	Fox Hill	276	Northern Highlands of Florida	Walton County	30°49′26″N 86°17′36″W
22	Weaver Hill	276	Northern Highlands of Florida	Washington County	30°37′08″N 85°38′16″W
23	Sand Mountain	272	Northern Highlands of Florida	Washington County	30°33′33″N 85°31′34″W
24	Windy Hill	272	Lake Wales Ridge	Lake County	28°30′56″N 81°42′26″W
25	Unnamed Peak southeast of Brooksville	270+	Brooksville Ridge	Hernando County	28°30′08″N 82°21′38″W
26	Chinsegut Hill	269	Brooksville Ridge	Hernando County	28°37′09″N 82°21′52″W
27	Chalk Hill	269	Northern Highlands of Florida	Washington County	30°34′23″N 85°33′30″W
28	Medley Landfill	265	N/A, Artificial	Miami-Dade County	25°51′32″N 80°21′00″W
29	Tate Hill	262	Northern Highlands of Florida	Holmes County	30°51′30″N 85°55′41″W
30	Mondon Hill	261	Brooksville Ridge	Hernando County	28°32′39″N 82°18′20″W
31	Brownell Hill	259	Northern Highlands of Florida	Holmes County	30°49′41″N 85°55′37″W
32	Reynolds Hill	256	Northern Highlands of Florida	Holmes County	30°50′29″N 85°57′20″W
33	Frazee Hill	251	Brooksville Ridge	Pasco County	28°23′47″N 82°12′36″W
34	Orange County High Point	250+	Lake Wales Ridge	Orange County	28°30′34″N 81°43′46″W
35	Cross Ridge	250	Lake Wales Ridge	Lake County	28°31′51″N 81°43′56″W
36	North Sugarloaf	250	Lake Wales Ridge	Lake County	28°39′29″N 81°44′27″W
37	Bunker Hill	249	Northern Highlands of Florida	Holmes County	30°47′45″N 85°58′25″W
38	Corbett Hill	249	Northern Highlands of Florida	Holmes County	30°58′18″N 85°37′59″W
39	Anderson Hill	247	Lake Wales Ridge	Lake County	28°31′43″N 81°44′09″W
40	Unnamed peak in Dundee	246	Lake Wales Ridge	Polk County	28°00′34″N 81°35′35″W
41	Highland Crest	246	Lake Wales Ridge	Polk County	27°55′00″N 81°34′21″W
42	Le Heup Hill	243	Brooksville Ridge	Pasco County	28°18′49″N 82°12′04″W
43	Marietta Hill	243	Lake Wales Ridge	Polk County	27°53′27″N 81°34′08″W
44	Nursery Hill	243	Brooksville Ridge	Pasco County	28°19′03″N 82°11′58″W
45	Murphy Hill	243	Northern Highlands of Florida	Holmes County	30°58′24″N 85°34′33″W
46	Orange Mountain	241	Lake Wales Ridge	Lake County	28°30′24″N 81°43′33″W
47	Ray Hill	240+	Northern Highlands of Florida	Walton County	30°39′34″N 85°57′30″W
48	Hickory Hill	240	Brooksville Ridge	Hernando County	28°28′59″N 82°16′25″W
49	Balcom Hill	240	Northern Highlands of Florida	Holmes County	30°58′59″N 85°33′47″W
50	Riley Hill	240	Northern Highlands of Florida	Holmes County	30°58′32″N 85°33′49″W
51	Jackson Hill	236	Northern Highlands of Florida	Holmes County	30°50′39″N 85°56′26″W
52	Terra del Sol	236	Lake Wales Ridge	Polk County	28°16′52″N 81°39′45″W
53	McIntosh Hill	233	Northern Highlands of Florida	Holmes County	30°56′48″N 85°35′00″W
54	Nancy Padgett Hill	233	Northern Highlands of Florida	Holmes County	30°48′30″N 85°59′49″W
55	Citrus County High Point	230+	Brooksville Ridge	Citrus County	28°53′40″N 82°26′41″W
56	Coates Hill	230	Northern Highlands of Florida	Holmes County	30°59′15″N 85°41′16″W
57	Highlands Reserve	230	Lake Wales Ridge	Polk County	28°18′23″N 81°40′17″W
58	Marsh Hill	230	Northern Highlands of Florida	Holmes County	30°56′41″N 85°35′50″W
59	Texas Hill	230	Northern Highlands of Florida	Jefferson County	30°33′24″N 83°52′19″W
60	Unnamed Peak in Haines City	226	Lakes Wales Ridge	Polk County, Florida	28°05′32″N 81°36′55″W
61	Tillis Hill	226	Brooksville Ridge	Citrus County	28°43′41″N 82°24′51″W
62	Unnamed Peak west of Avalon Lake	226	Lake Wales Ridge	Lake County	28°30′39″N 81°39′33″W
63	Unnamed Peak north of Lake Charles	226	Lake Wales Ridge	Lake County	28°33′50″N 81°44′35″W
64	Mount Trashmore	225	N/A, Artificial	Broward County	26°17′01″N 80°09′42″W
65	Orange County High Point	225	Lake Wales Ridge	Orange County	28°30′34″N 81°39′27″W
66	Greer Hill	223	Brooksville Ridge	Pasco County	28°17′48″N 82°11′20″W
67	Crater Hill	220	Northern Highlands of Florida	Holmes County	30°56′52″N 85°36′13″W
68	Bradford County High Point	220	Trail Ridge	Bradford County	30°01′59″N 82°02′56″W
69	Putnam County High Point	220	Trail Ridge	Putnam County	29°39′44″N 81°55′12″W
70	Brown Hill	213	Northern Highlands of Florida	Holmes County	30°58′20″N 85°35′29″W
71	Smothers Hill	213	Northern Highlands of Florida	Holmes County	30°54′44″N 85°35′26″W
72	Taylor Hill	213	Northern Highlands of Florida	Holmes County	30°57′21″N 85°38′40″W
73	Bailey Hill	210	Brooksville Ridge	Hernando County	28°36′07″N 82°28′44″W
74	Kirk Hill	210	Brooksville Ridge	Hernando County	28°35′05″N 82°18′27″W
75	Stokes Hill	203	Northern Highlands of Florida	Holmes County	30°56′25″N 85°36′43″W
76	Blackburn Hill	200	Northern Highlands of Florida	Holmes County	30°56′27″N 85°39′18″W
77	Sixteenth Hill	200	Northern Highlands of Florida	Jackson County	30°44′29″N 84°56′13″W
78	Saddle Hill	194	Northern Highlands of Florida	Holmes County	30°46′49″N 85°55′17″W
79	Big Hill	190	Northern Highlands of Florida	Washington County	30°40′57″N 85°46′28″W
80	Stage Coach Hill	190	Brooksville Ridge	Citrus County	28°41′16″N 82°24′07″W
81	Bunker Hill	186	Lake Wales Ridge	Osceola County	28°19′20″N 81°35′56″W
82	Lake Louisa State Park High Point	185	Lake Wales Ridge	Lake County	28°27′13″N 81°43′34″W
83	Thrill Hill	185	Mount Dora Ridge	Lake County	28°52′15″N 81°37′11″W
84	Dykes Hill	184	Northern Highlands of Florida	Walton County	30°36′12″N 85°58′33″W
85	McKinnon Hill	184	Northern Highlands of Florida	Walton County	30°36′10″N 85°57′30″W
86	Tucker Hill	181	Brooksville Ridge	Hernando County	28°35′35″N 82°17′49″W
87	Worley Hill	180	Northern Highlands of Florida	Holmes County	30°53′12″N 85°36′46″W
88	Laurel Hill	177	Northern Highlands of Florida	Walton County	30°35′32″N 85°55′48″W
89	Big Hill	174	Northern Highlands of Florida	Walton County	30°36′02″N 85°57′02″W
90	Hudson Hill	174	Northern Highlands of Florida	Washington County	30°34′14″N 85°40′53″W
91	Morrison Hill	174	Northern Highlands of Florida	Holmes County	30°45′33″N 85°57′30″W
92	Hunter Hill	171	Northern Highlands of Florida	Walton County	30°36′04″N 85°56′27″W
93	Five Mile Pond Hill	170	Brooksville Ridge	Citrus County	28°50′04″N 82°24′03″W
94	Tangerine Hill	167	Mount Dora Ridge	Orange County	28°46′14″N 81°37′53″W
95	Tomato Hill	166	Central Valley	Lake County	28°48′48″N 81°50′13″W
96	Nearing Hill	164	Northern Highlands of Florida	Washington County	30°45′22″N 85°33′15″W
97	Haddock Hill	161	Northern Highlands of Florida	Washington County	30°38′00″N 85°39′30″W
98	Poplar Head Hill	161	Northern Highlands of Florida	Washington County	30°43′47″N 85°39′07″W
99	Sheep Hill	161	Northern Highlands of Florida	Holmes County	30°43′29″N 85°55′03″W
100	Long Pond Hill	154	Northern Highlands of Florida	Holmes County	30°43′38″N 85°58′08″W
101	Sand Hill	154	Northern Highlands of Florida	Washington County	30°46′58″N 85°32′56″W
102	Reynold Hill	151	Northern Highlands of Florida	Holmes County	30°54′09″N 85°53′34″W
103	Fishers Island	151	Lake Wales Ridge	Osceola County	28°19′38″N 81°37′29″W
104	Saint Paul Hill	148	Northern Highlands of Florida	Walton County	30°40′54″N 85°56′32″W
105	Scrub Hill	144	Northern Highlands of Florida	Walton County	30°34′23″N 86°08′41″W
106	Hickory Hill	131	Northern Highlands of Florida	Jackson County	30°37′01″N 84°56′03″W
107	Hicks Hill	131	Northern Highlands of Florida	Washington County	30°51′51″N 85°35′13″W
108	Mill Spring Hill	131	Northern Highlands of Florida	Holmes County	30°50′59″N 85°53′36″W
109	Old Hammock Hill	131	Northern Highlands of Florida	Holmes County	30°57′09″N 85°40′51″W
110	Seminole County High Point	130	Mount Dora Ridge	Seminole County	28°41′17″N 81°27′04″W
111	Steep Hollow Hill	128	Northern Highlands of Florida	Washington County	30°41′33″N 85°50′53″W
112	Scenic Hill	120	Lake County	Lake County	28°49′40″N 81°35′30″W
113	Black Jack Hill	110	Gilchrist County Hills	Gilchrist County	29°39′52″N 82°42′58″W
114	Hogan Hill	108	Northern Highlands of Florida	Walton County	30°36′11″N 85°56′01″W
115	Crawford Hill	105	Northern Highlands of Florida	Walton County	30°35′45″N 85°55′36″W
116	Harry P Leu Gardens High Point	104	Orlando Ridge	Orange County	28°33′57″N 81°21′20″W
117	Lake Norris Hill	100	Marion Upland	Lake County	28°55′02″N 81°33′44″W
118	Saint Francis Hill	98	Marion Upland	Lake County	29°01′33″N 81°26′01″W
119	Seminole State Forest South High Point	95	Marion Upland	Lake County	28°49′00″N 81°28′03″W
120	Bess Nook	92	Northern Highlands of Florida	Washington County	30°43′07″N 85°44′03″W
121	Prevatt Lake Sandhill	85	Mount Dora Ridge	Orange County	28°43′10″N 81°29′28″W
122	Kelly Park High Point	85	Mount Dora Ridge	Orange County	28°45′34″N 81°30′32″W
123	Club Lake Ridge	83	Mount Dora Ridge	Orange County	28°43′50″N 81°30′01″W
124	Ridge Road	85	Largo Clearwater Ridge	Pinellas County	27°54′34″N 82°47′14″W
125	Skyline Drive	80	Atlantic Coastal Ridge	Martin County	27°15′09″N 80°14′00″W
126	Slaughter Hill	79	Northern Highlands of Florida	Holmes County	28°30′17″N 82°10′31″W
127	Aske Hill	72	Brooksville Ridge	Hernando County	30°51′46″N 85°52′47″W
128	Vista View Park	69.95	N/A, Artificial	Broward County	26°04′04″N 80°20′34″W
129	Rock Springs Run State Preserve High Point	63	Marion Upland	Lake County	28°48′01″N 81°26′43″W
130	Blue Mountain	56	Northern Highlands of Florida	Walton County	30°20′50″N 86°12′11″W
131	Indian Hill	51	Southwest Florida	Collier County	25°54′48″N 81°41′41″W
132	Red Hill	49	Northern Highlands of Florida	Liberty County	30°13′20″N 85°03′59″W
