= Geology of Florida =

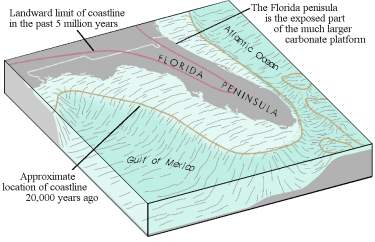
The structure of the Florida platform, the foundation of which came from the African continent over 200 million years ago.

Florida is part of the Florida Platform, a plateau of sedimentary rocks of the Mesozoic and Cenozoic eras sitting atop a basement of igneous, metamorphic, and sedimentary rocks of Proterozoic, Paleozoic, and Triassic age. The Florida Platform also includes southern Alabama and Georgia and the continental shelf adjacent to the three states. Part of the Florida basement was part of Africa before the formation of the supercontinent Pangaea, but separated from Africa and remained attached to North America when Pangaea broke up in the early Jurassic, while the rest of the Florida basement consists of volcanic rocks that erupted during that breakup.

The emergent portion of the platform was created during the Eocene to Oligocene as the Gulf Trough filled with silts, clays, and sands. Flora and fauna began appearing during the Miocene. No land animals were present in Florida prior to the Miocene.

== Basement ==
=== Components ===
The basement of the Florida Platform comprises igneous, metamorphic, and sedimentary rocks of Proterozoic, Paleozoic, and Triassic age. The top of the basement of the platform is marked by an unconformal surface of pre-Middle Jurassic age overlain by evaporite, carbonate, and siliciclastic deposits of Middle Jurassic to Holocene ages. The top of the basement is approximately 915 metres (3,002 ft) below mean sea level (MSL) in the north-central Florida peninsula, and slopes downward on the east towards the Atlantic Ocean basin, on the west towards the Gulf of Mexico basin, and on the south towards the South Florida Basin, reaching 5,180 metres (16,990 ft) below MSL in southern Florida.

The basement rocks of the Florida Platform are divided into two regions by the Jay Fault that runs from southeastern Florida to the northwest across the Florida peninsula to north of Tampa Bay and then under the Gulf and across the western end of the Florida panhandle. To the northeast of the Jay Fault various metamorphic and other volcanic rocks of early Paleozoic age known as the Osceola Complex extend into southern Georgia and the Florida panhandle. The Suwannee Basin sequence of middle Paleozoic sandstones and shales, which is up to 2.5 kilometres (1.6 mi) thick, overlies the Osceola Complex in northern Florida and southeastern Georgia. A complex graben system, known as the South Georgia Rift, Southwest Georgia Embayment, Apalachicola Embayment, or Tallahassee Graben, underlies much of the Florida panhandle and southern Georgia. Southwest of the Jay Fault in the southern part of the Florida peninsula the basement is primarily composed of the Mesozoic-age South Florida Volcanic Rocks.

=== Origin ===
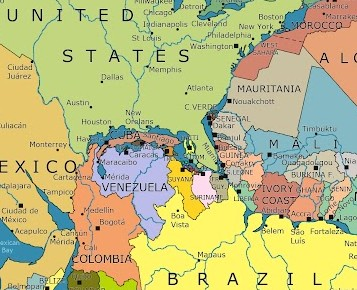
Map of Pangaea with modern countries overlaid. Florida is in the center, extending between western Africa and northern South America.

The Florida Platform originated in Gondwana in the early Paleozoic. Data from paleontology, isotope geochemistry, and paleomagnetism studies indicate that the platform was part of the West Africa continental margin. In the late Paleozoic Era, Laurentia (the core of what is now North America) converged on Gondwana, closing the Iapetus Ocean and creating the Pangaea supercontinent. The part of Gondwana facing Laurentia included what are now western Africa and northern South America.

Reconstructions of Pangaea place the Florida Platform at the junction of the African, North American, and South American continents. A system of rifts that would eventually produce the Atlantic Ocean began opening along the pre-Pangaea continental margins during the Triassic. The rifting is believed to have been initiated by hot spots, including one near the southern end of the Florida Platform. Isotopic signatures of the South Florida Volcanic Rocks indicate they were produced by a hot spot. The initial rifting along the join between North American and what is now the Florida Platform failed, and the rifting shifted, separating the Florida Platform from Africa.

As a result of the rifting, North America began separating from Africa and South America in the early Jurassic, with the Gulf of Mexico also opening in the early Jurassic. Grabens and horsts in the basement of the western part of the Florida Platform may have developed due to stresses on the crust caused by the opening of the Gulf of Mexico, or may be horsts that broke off of North America and reattached to the Florida Platform. The Florida Platform has been tectonically quiet since the end of the rifting. There has been regional uplift in the sedimentary layers that have accumulated on the Florida Platform, but they are the product of epeirogenic movement caused by density changes resulting from dissolution of limestone.

== Limestone Over Bedrock ==
Florida was covered by shallow water during the earlier part of the Cenozoic Era, which is the main reason why there is a massive amount of limestone under its surface. The largest deposits of rock phosphate in the United States are found in Florida. Most of this is in Bone Valley in central and west-central Florida.

Extended systems of underwater caves, sinkholes and springs are found throughout the state and supply most of the water used by residents. This type of terrain (geomorphology) that develops over a carbonate platform or strata is called karst topography. Cover-Collapse sinkhole risk is attributed to groundwater withdrawals and conditions, which are effected by population density and use of surrounding resources. Florida-characteristic rainfall events also contribute to sinkhole development.

The limestone is topped with sandy soils deposited as ancient beaches over millions of years as global sea levels rose and fell. During the last glacial period, lower sea levels and a drier climate revealed a much wider peninsula, largely savanna. While there are sinkholes in much of the state, modern sinkholes most commonly form in the Tampa Bay area and Central Florida. Pinellas and Hillsborough Counties have had notable sinkhole events in the last 30 years, concurrent with increased urban and suburban development.

== Geomorphology ==
Geomorphological units in Florida

Geomorphology is the study of the origins of landforms. Landforms in Florida include topographical elements such as ridges, valleys, plains, marine terraces, and karst landforms. All of Florida falls within the Coastal Plain of the Eastern United States, and has a maximum elevation above sea level of 104 metres (341 ft). Marine forces have dominated the shaping of landforms in Florida. Geologists began recognizing geomorphological regions in Florida in the late 19th century. In 1913, a report divided the central peninsula of Florida into four sections. A 1939 study divided Florida into more than 60 physiographic regions. A study in 1964 described Florida as having several physiographic regions; the Atlantic Coastal Lowlands, Intermediate Coastal Lowlands, Gulf Coastal Lowlands, Central Highlands, Northern Highlands, and Mariana Lowlands, with almost 100 secondary and tertiary sub-divisions. As of 2022, the Florida Geological Survey has designated 10 geomorphological districts and 71 geomorphological provinces in Florida. The districts share topography that has been produced by related processes. Provinces have shared features that have a common origin. Some of the districts and provinces in northern Florida are only partly in Florida, extending into Georgia or Alabama.

=== Ancient Sea Levels ===
Florida has a number of sand ridges that are believed to have formed as barrier islands, beach ridges or spits along ancient shore lines. The sand had been eroded from the southern Appalachian Mountains and the coastal plain at the foot of those mountains and eventually filled the Gulf Trough and then spread across the carbonate surface of the Florida Platform. Sea level fluctuations and ocean currents sculpted the sand into long ridges, the most prominent of which are Lake Wales Ridge, Trail Ridge (which extends into Georgia), Mount Dora Ridge, and Brooksville Ridge. Other ridges on peninsular Florida include the Atlantic Coastal Ridge, Bell Ridge, Bombing Range Ridge, Center Park Ridge, Crescent City Ridge, Green Ridge, Lake Henry Ridge, Lakeland Ridge, Orlando Ridge, Ten Mile Ridge, and Winter Haven Ridge. The Gordonville Ridge, Lake Henry Ridge, Lakeland Ridge, and Winter Haven Ridge are grouped with the Lake Wales Ridge in the Lake Wales Ridge Complex geomorphological province.

Fluctuations in sea level during the Quaternary glaciation resulted in sea water periodically inundating parts of Florida. Geologists have identified several raised beaches, also known as marine terraces, in Florida at various elevations above the current sea level. These features were believed to have been created by wave action when the sea level was relatively steady for a prolonged period. Eight marine terrace levels have been identified at various locations in Florida, although not all in the same study, including:

- The Hazelhurst terrace or delta shoreline, formerly called the Brandywine terrace, is a reported relic shoreline found in Forida's panhandle and, less extensively, eastward to Jefferson and Madison counties. Deposits attributed to the terrace or delta are found at elevations of 65.5 to 97 metres (215 to 318 ft), and may have been formed in the late Miocene or early Pliocene epochs.
- The Coharie terrace is found at elevations of 215 to 220 feet (66 to 67 m), and may have formed during the Pre-Illinoian stage of the Quaternary glaciation.
- The Sunderland or Okeefenokee terrace is found at elevations of 150 to 170 feet (46 to 52 m), and may have formed during the Pre-Illinoian stage of the Quaternary glaciation.
- The Wicomico terrace is found at elevations of 90 to 105 feet (27 to 32 m), and may have formed during the Sangamonian stage of the Quaternary glaciation.
- The Penholloway terrace is found at elevations of 70 to 80 feet (21 to 24 m), and may have formed during the Sangamonian stage of the Quaternary glaciation.
- The Talbot terrace is found at elevations of 40 to 45 feet (12 to 14 m), and may have formed during the Sangamonian stage of the Quaternary glaciation.
- The Pamlico terrace is found at elevations of 25 to 35 feet (7.6 to 10.7 m), and may have formed during the interglacial period between the Early and Late Wisconsin glaciations.
- The Silver Bluff terrace is found at elevations of 8 to 10 feet (2.4 to 3.0 m), and may have formed during the Holocene epoch.

An interactive map of Marine terraces in Florida is maintained by the Florida Department of Environmental Protection.

While it was formerly thought that sea levels had risen as high as 70 metres (230 ft) above the current sea level during the Pleistocene, and that the above reported terraces had been produced during periods in which the sea level had remained at the corresponding elevation for an extended period of time, it is now believed that the sea level never rose more than 20 metres (66 ft) above the current level during the Pleistocene, and that not all of the terraces are from the Pleistocene. The terraces are no longer considered valid stratigraphic units, and the sediments forming them are often described as "undifferentiated sands".

== Earthquakes ==
Florida is tied with North Dakota as having the fewest earthquakes of any US state. Because Florida is not located near any tectonic plate boundaries, earthquakes are very rare, but not completely unknown. In January 1879, a shock occurred near St. Augustine. There were reports of heavy shaking that knocked plaster from walls and articles from shelves. Similar effects were noted at Daytona Beach 50 miles (80 km) south. The tremor was felt as far south as Tampa and as far north as Savannah, Georgia. In January 1880, Cuba was the center of two strong earthquakes that sent severe shock waves through the city of Key West, Florida. Another earthquake centered outside Florida was the 1886 Charleston earthquake. The shock was felt throughout northern Florida, ringing church bells at St. Augustine and severely jolting other towns along that section of Florida's east coast. Jacksonville residents felt many of the strong aftershocks that occurred in September, October, and November 1886. A magnitude 6.0 earthquake in 2006 centered about 260 miles (420 km) southwest of Tampa and west of Fort Myers in the Gulf of Mexico sent shock waves through southwest and central Florida. The earthquake was too small to trigger a tsunami, and no damage was reported. Minor shaking was felt in Southwest Florida. Some taller buildings in the city of Cape Coral reported swaying. On January 28, 2020, a 7.7 magnitude earthquake between Cuba and Jamaica was felt in Florida, causing many office and residential buildings in Miami to be evacuated. In Orlando, the Spectrum Stadium at University of Central Florida shook from the earthquake.

== Geological Sites ==
There are nine state-designated geological sites in Florida. These are either state parks or known geologic sites.

- Windley Key Fossil Reef Geological State Park Florida Caverns State Park
- Edward Ball Wakulla Springs State Park
- Falling Waters State Park
- Torreya State Park
- Jennings Bluff Tract
- Paynes Prairie Preserve State Park
- Alum Bluff

== See also ==
Okeechobean Sea

Everglades Pseudoatoll

Acline Fauna

Florida Museum of Natural History

Geomorphology

Isotope geochemistry

Sedimentary rock

== Sources ==
- Heatherington, Ann L.; Mueller, Paul A. (1997). "Geochemistry and Origin of Florida Crustal Basement Terranes". In Randazzo, Anthony F.; Jones, Douglas S. (eds.). The Geology of Florida. Gainesville, Florida: University Press of Florida. pp. 27–38. ISBN 9780813014968.
- Hine, Albert C. (1997). "Structural and Paleoceanographic Evolution of the Margins of the Florida Platform". In Randazzo, Anthony F.; Jones, Douglas S. (eds.). The Geology of Florida. Gainesville, Florida: University Press of Florida. pp. 169–194. ISBN 9780813014968.
- Randazzo, Anthony F. (1997). "The Sedimentary Platform of Florida: Mesozoic to Cenozoic". In Randazzo, Anthony F.; Jones, Douglas S. (eds.). The Geology of Florida. Gainesville, Florida: University Press of Florida. pp. 39–56. ISBN 9780813014968.
- Schmidt, Walter (1997). "Geomorphology and Physiography of Florida". In Randazzo, Anthony F.; Jones, Douglas S. (eds.). The Geology of Florida. Gainesville, Florida: University Press of Florida. pp. 1–12. ISBN 9780813014968.
- Smith, Douglas L.; Lord, Kenneth M. (1997). "Tectonic Evolution and Geophysics of the Florida Basement". In Randazzo, Anthony F.; Jones, Douglas S. (eds.). The Geology of Florida. Gainesville, Florida: University Press of Florida. pp. 13–26. ISBN 9780813014968.
- Scott, Thomsas M. (2011). "Geology of the Florida Platform: Pre-Mesozoic to Recent". In Buster, Noreen A.; Holmes, Charles W. (eds.). Gulf of Mexico Origin, Waters, and Biota: Volume 3, Geology. Texas A&M University Press. ISBN 978-1-60344-290-9.
- Williams, Christopher P.; Scott, Thomas M.; Upchurch, Sam B. (2022). Florida Geomorphology Atlas. Special Publication 59 (Report). Tallahassee, Florida: Florida Geological Survey.
