= List of highest United States cities by state or territory =

This is an incomplete list of the highest settlements in each state or territory in the United States, as well as the District of Columbia. These settlements may be cities, towns, census-designated places or other unincorporated communities. Only settlements that are permanently occupied year-round are included.

In some cases, the elevation provided is the highest point within the limits of the settlement, while in others it is the average elevation or the elevation of the settlement's central point. As such, the different settlements listed may not be directly comparable. Some unincorporated communities, such as Lakewood, Florida, lack official boundaries; it is therefore subjective whether a specific high point can be said to be located within these settlements.

== List ==
Elevation	Name	State, district or territory	Ref.	Comments
1708 feet (521 m)	Mentone	Alabama		
3396 feet (1035 m)	Paxson	Alaska		
1340 feet (408 m)	A'oloau village	American Samoa		The highest village on Tutuila island (and American Samoa) is the village of A'oloau — A'oloau is at an elevation of 1,340 feet (410 meters), and had a population of 615 as of 2010. The highest peak in American Samoa is Lata Mountain at an elevation of 3,163 feet (964 meters). Lata Mountain is located in the Manu'a District on Ta‘ū island. There are no human settlements on the highest elevations of Lata Mountain. The population of the Manu'a Islands (which includes Ta'u) is 1,143 as of 2010.
8356 feet (2547 m)	Greer	Arizona		Greer is an unincorporated community and census-designated place in Apache County, Arizona, United States. Located within the White Mountains of Arizona and surrounded by the Apache-Sitgreaves National Forest Greer is the highest town in the state at an elevation of approximately 8,400 feet (2,600 m). The highest incorporated town in Arizona is Eagar at an elevation of 7,080 feet (2,160 m). Eagar lies 20 minutes northeast of Greer along the New Mexico border.
2339 feet (713 m)	Deer	Arkansas		Unincorporated; highest incorporated city is Winslow at 1,729 feet (527 m)
7920 feet (2414 m)	Mammoth Lakes	California		Highest incorporated town in California is Mammoth Lakes at an elevation of 7,920 feet (2,410 m)
10,578 feet (3224 m)	Alma	Colorado		The town limits of Winter Park (9052 feet (2759 m)) extend to 12,060 feet (3676 m). Alma is the highest incorporated city at 10,578 feet (3224 m). Climax is at 11,362 feet (3,463 m) and once was incorporated, but is no longer and does not have a permanent population.
1319 feet (402 m)	Goshen	Connecticut		Other contenders include Norfolk, often considered the "icebox" of the state, and Salisbury, which contains the state's highest point at 2,379 feet on the border with Massachusetts.
420 feet (128 m)	Barkley	Delaware		The city is closest to Ebright Azimuth, the highest point in the state
409 feet (125 m)	Washington DC	District of Columbia		Fort Reno Park has the highest point in the District of Columbia.
345 feet (105 m)	Lakewood	Florida		Unincorporated settlement by Britton Hill, the highest natural point in Florida. Britton Hill is the lowest high point in any state. The highest incorporated town is nearby Paxton, at 318 feet (97 m).
3297 feet (1005 m)	Sky Valley	Georgia		The elevation of the valley floor is approximately 3,100 feet, while areas within the city limits on the slopes of Rabun Bald exceed 4,200 feet.
1332 feet (406 m)	Agat	Guam		Mount Lamlam is the highest mountain in Guam (1,332 ft/406 meters), and it is located within the boundaries of the village of Agat. However, most of the village's population lives near sea level. The village of Umatac is also at a high elevation.
3750 feet (1143 m)	Volcano	Hawaii		
6290 feet (1917 m)	Island Park	Idaho		
994 feet (303 m)	Stockton	Illinois		
1211 feet (369 m)	Bethel	Indiana		
1598 feet (487 m)	Allendorf	Iowa		Unincorporated; highest incorporated city or town is Melvin at 1,581 feet (482 m).
3907 feet (1191 m)	Kanorado	Kansas		
1762 feet (537 m)	Payne Gap	Kentucky		
384 feet (117 m)	Arcadia	Louisiana		
1795 feet (547 m)	Carrabassett Valley	Maine		
2894 feet (882 m)	Keysers Ridge	Maryland		Unincorporated; highest incorporated town is Deer Park.
2064 feet (629 m)	Peru	Massachusetts		
1473 feet (449 m)	Iron River	Michigan		
2000 feet (610 m)	Isabella	Minnesota		Unincorporated community
643 feet (196 m)	Ashland	Mississippi		
1694 feet (516 m)	Cedar Gap	Missouri		Unincorporated; highest incorporated town is Seymour at 1,645 feet (501 m)
7608 feet (2319 m)	Cooke City	Montana		
4876 feet (1486 m)	Harrison	Nebraska		
7510 feet (2289 m)	Mount Charleston	Nevada		Unincorporated town
1980 feet (604 m)	Clarksville	New Hampshire		
1066 feet (325 m)	Montague	New Jersey		High Point, the highest point in the state, is located within the Montague township
9321 feet (2841 m)	Taos Ski Valley	New Mexico		
2349 feet (716 m)	Knapp Creek	New York		Unincorporated; highest incorporated city is Olean at 1,447 feet (441 m).
5506 feet (1678 m)	Beech Mountain	North Carolina		
3192 feet (973 m)	Rhame	North Dakota		
1627 feet (496 m)	Rota municipality	Northern Mariana Islands		Rota is the highest municipality in the Northern Mariana Islands with a permanent human population. An unnamed point on Agrihan island is higher (3,166 feet/965 meters) but Agrihan island has no permanent human population. Agrihan island is located within the Northern Islands Municipality, which also has no permanent human population. Rota had a population of 2,527 in 2010.
1550 feet (472 m)	Bellefontaine	Ohio		Campbell Hill, the highest point in the state, is within the Bellefontaine city limits
4353 feet (1327 m)	Kenton	Oklahoma		
6306 feet (1922 m)	Greenhorn	Oregon		No year round population, but there are a handful of cabins which are semi-permanently populated
2530 feet (771 m)	Seven Springs	Pennsylvania		Unincorporated; highest incorporated city is Hazleton at 1,886 feet (575 m), one of the highest incorporated cities east of the Mississippi.
2401 feet (732 m)	Aibonito	Puerto Rico		Aibonito has the highest central plaza of any municipality in Puerto Rico at 2,401 feet (732 m). The highest point in Puerto Rico is Cerro de Punta in Ponce municipality at 4,390 feet (1,338 m).
812 feet (247 m)	Foster	Rhode Island		Jerimoth Hill, the highest point in the state, is located in Foster
1750 feet (533 m)	Rocky Bottom	South Carolina		Unincorporated, Pickens is the highest incorporated town at 1,120 feet (340 m). A golf resort development on top of Glassy Mountain in Greenville County exists at 2,760 feet, but it is not considered a community by the Geographic Names Information System, which documents communities in the United States.
5315 feet (1620 m)	Custer	South Dakota		Most of Lead surpasses Custer in elevation
3133 feet (955 m)	Trade	Tennessee		Unincorporated; highest incorporated city is Mountain City, elevation 2,418 feet
4921 feet (1500 m)	Fort Davis	Texas		Unincorporated; highest incorporated city is Marfa, elevation 4,685 feet
9800 feet (2987 m)	Brian Head	Utah		
1555 feet (474 m)	Northside subdistrict, Saint Thomas	U.S. Virgin Islands		The highest point of the U.S. Virgin Islands is Crown Mountain, located in the Northside subdistrict on Saint Thomas island. The population of the Northside subdistrict was 10,049 in 2010. The settlement of Zambee is near the highest point. The population of Saint Thomas island in 2010 was 51,634 (about 48.5% of US Virgin Islands total).
2215 feet (675 m)	Woodford	Vermont		
3638 feet (1109 m)	Whitetop	Virginia		Unincorporated. The Town of Troutdale, Virginia is an incorporated community with a population of 140 and an elevation of 3,120 feet.
2622 feet (799 m)	Waterville	Washington		Highest settlement is Paradise at 5,400 feet (1,600 m), but does not have any permanent population
3751 feet (1143 m)	Flat Top	West Virginia		Unincorporated. The highest incorporated town is Davis at 3,100 feet (940 m) The Snowshoe Mountain resort village is the second-highest point in the state at 4848 feet (1478 m), but is neither incorporated nor permanently populated.
1736 feet (529 m)	Star Lake	Wisconsin		
9728 feet (2965 m)	Jay's Roost	Wyoming		Not a census-designated place; highest census-designated place is Fox Park at 9,065 feet (2,763 m).
