= Central Highlands of Florida =

Geomorphological region

The Central Highlands of Florida is a geomorphological region of ridges, elevated areas called uplands, and valleys that extend up the center of the Florida peninsula from a point northwest of Lake Okeechobee to northern Florida. Most of the ridges and lower elevations and the major valleys are parallel to each other and to the Atlantic Coast of Florida.

== Extent ==
The Central Highlands of Florida consists of several ridges and other elevated areas separated by a pair of broad valleys extending down the middle of the Florida Peninsula, most of which are oriented more or less north-south, parallel to the Atlantic Coast of Florida. It is bordered to the east by the Atlantic Coastal Lowlands and to the west by the Gulf Coastal Lowlands of Florida, which meet to the south of the Central Highlands. Major segments of the larger rivers in the Central Highlands, including the Withlacoochee, Oklawaha, St. Johns, Econolockhatchee, Kissimmee, and Peace rivers, as well as lines of lakes, are also parallel to the coast. The southern end of the Highlands is at a point northwest of Lake Okeechobee in southern Highlands County, while the northern end has been variously defined as either the Florida-Georgia border or the Cody Scarp across southern Alachua County, in the latter case with the area north of the Cody Scarp assigned to the Northern Highlands.

== Ridges ==
The Central Highlands of Florida includes several long narrow ridges that are parallel to each other and to the Atlantic coast. The longest and must prominent ridges are the Lake Wales Ridge on the east side, with a maximum elevation above sea level of 312 feet (95 m), the highest in peninsular Florida, running about 190 kilometres (120 mi) from southern Highlands County to southern Lake County and the Brooksville Ridge on the west side, up to 300 feet (91 m) above sea level, running about 177 kilometres (110 mi) from southeastern Pasco County to eastern Gilchrist County, Those two ridges and the Winter Haven and Orlando ridges are the highest features in the Central Highlands. The Mount Dora Ridge runs from east of the northern end of the Lake Wales Ridge in western Orange County to southeastern Putnam County. The shorter Crescent City and Orlando ridges are east of the Mount Dora Ridge.

West of the Lake Wales Ridge are the Winter Haven Ridge and what has been called its southern extension, the Lake Henry Ridge. West of the Winter Haven Ridge is the Lakeland Ridge. The three ridges are in Polk County. Other ridges in the Central Highlands include the Deland, Cotton Plant, and Gordonville ridges The larger ridges are long, straight, narrow, and parallel. The ridges have been described as relict beach ridges created when sea levels stood higher in the past.

== Hills and uplands ==
Uplands are areas with elevations intermediate between those of the higher ridges and the valleys and with lower relief than the ridges. Named elevated features include the Lake, Marion, Polk, and Sumter uplands; the Fairfield Hills, Ocala Hills, and Rock Ridge Hills; and Martel Hill and Geneva Hill.

== Valleys ==
The Central Highlands of Florida includes several valleys. The major valleys, the Central and Western Valleys, run parallel to the ridges, and thus to the Atlantic Coast. The floors of the valleys are generally between 50 and 100 feet above sea level. The St. Johns River Offset, the middle reach of the St. Johns River, also flows through the Central Highlands.

The Central Valley lies to the west of the Mount Dora Ridge, while the Western Valley lies east of the Brooksville Ridge. Between the two valleys are, from south to north, the Lake Upland, the Sumter Upland, the Ocala Hills, and the Fairfield Hills. The Central and Western Valleys are connected by two cross valleys, the Alachua Lake Cross Valley and the Lake Harris Cross Valley.

The Withlacoochee River flows in the Western Valley from near Zephyr Hills northward to the Dunnellon Gap (near Dunnellon) near the middle of the Brooksville Ridge, where it turns west towards the Gulf of Mexico. The Hillsborough River flows southward in the Western Valley from south of Zephyr Hills through the Zephyr Hills Gap at the southern end of the Western Valley (the two rivers rise close together in the Green Swamp). The Santa Fe River flows from the Northern Uplands out of the High Springs Gap at the north end of the Brooksville Ridge. Tsala Apopka Lake and Lake Panasofkee are the major lakes in the northern part of the Western Valley. The Cotton Plant Ridge, oriented northeast to southwest, perpendicular to the general tend of ridges and valleys in the Central Highlands, constricts the Western Valley at Romeo.

The Central Valley is shorter than the Western Valley, but about as wide. Almost all of the valley is occupied by the Oklawaha River and its tributary Orange Creek. The Central Valley has several lakes. Lake Apopka is at the southern end with, in order northward, lakes Harris, Dora, Griffin, Eustis, Yale, and Orange, Lochloosa and Newnans lakes. The Oklawaha River flows out of the valley at the Kenwood Gap in the Mount Dora Ridge.

Two cross valleys (oriented east-west) connect the Central and Western valleys. To the south the Lake Harris Cross Valley runs from the Western Valley to a juncture with the Central Valley at Lake Harris. It is 8 to 10 miles (13 to 16 km) long and 3 to 5 miles (4.8 to 8.0 km) wide, and separates the Polk and Sumter uplands. To the north the Alachua Lake Cross Valley runs from the Western Valley though Paynes Prairie (formerly called Alachua Lake) to the Central Valley. This valley separates the Fairfield Hills on the south from the Northern Uplands.

== Northern Highlands ==
The Northern Highlands has sometimes been defined to include northern Florida north and east of the Cody Scarp and west of the eastern toe of the Trail Ridge, an area that has also been included in some definitions of the Central Highlands of Florida. Most of that area is part of the Okefenokee Basin, which extends into southern Georgia. Besides the Okeefenokee Basin, Cody Scarp and Trail Ridge, the Northern Highlands also include the Florahome Valley in Putnam County.

== Sources ==
- Schmidt, Walter (1997). "Geomorphology and Physiography of Florida". In Randazzo, Anthony F.; Jones, Douglas S. (eds.). The Geology of Florida. Gainesville, Florida: University Press of Florida. pp. 1–12. ISBN 9780813014968.
- White, William A. (1970). The Geomorphology of the Florida Peninsula (Geological Bulletin No. 51) (Report). Tallahassee, Florida: Florida Bureau of Geology.
- Williams, Christopher P.; Scott, Thomas M.; Upchurch, Sam B. (2022). Florida Geomorphology Atlas (PDF). Special Publication 59 (Report). Tallahassee, Florida: Florida Geological Survey.
