= Driskill Mountain =

Mountain in Louisiana, United States

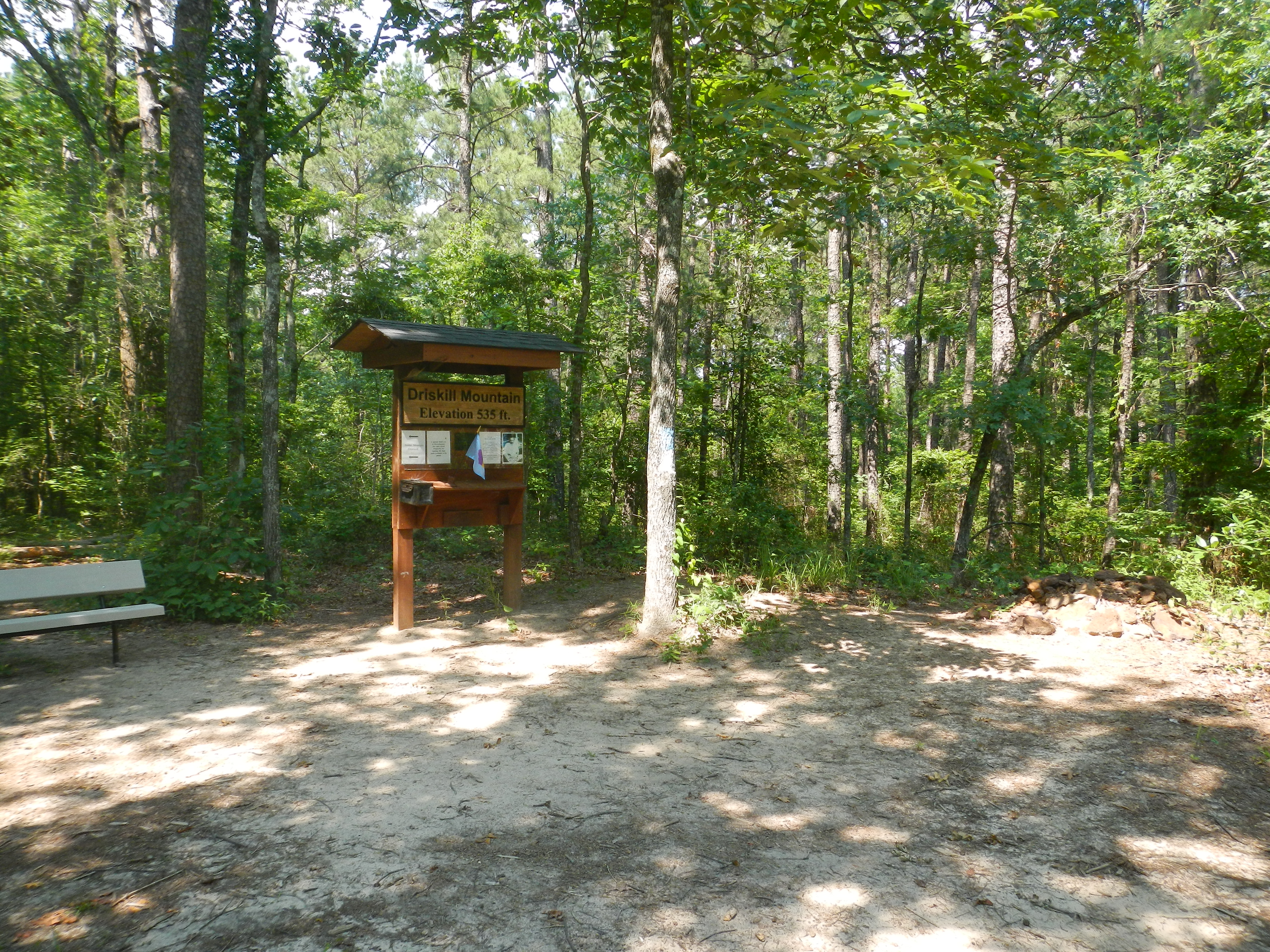
- Driskill Mountain Summit, May 2011

Highest point
- Elevation: 535 ft (163 m) NGVD 29
- Prominence: 225 ft (69 m)
- Listing: U.S. state high point 48th
- Coordinates: 32°25′29″N 92°53′51″W

Geography
- Location within Louisiana Location within the United States
- Location: Bienville Parish, Louisiana, U.S.

Climbing
- Easiest route: Hike

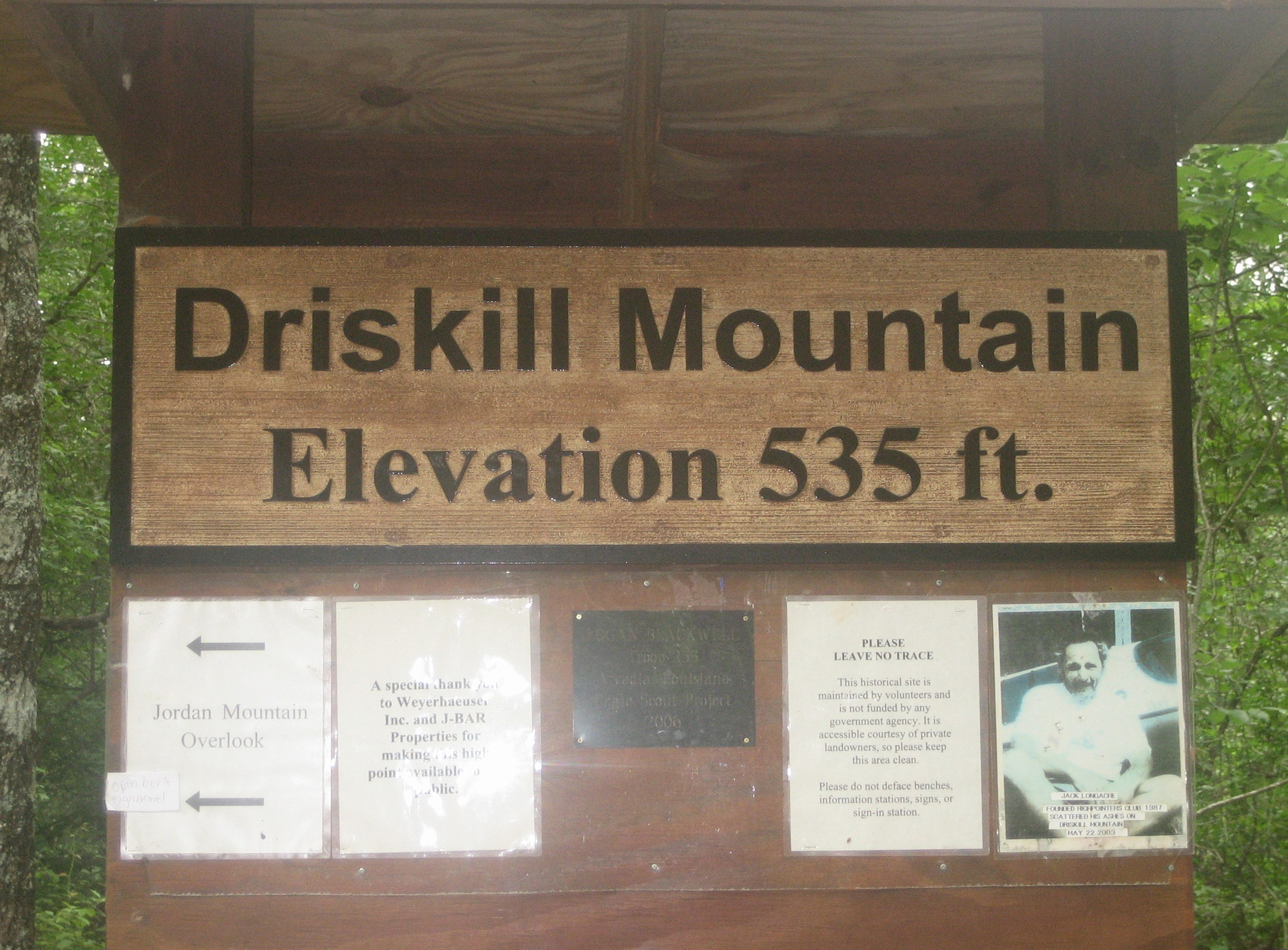
Location of logbook at top of Driskill Mountain, May 2009

Driskill Mountain (also referred to as Mount Driskill) is the highest natural summit in Louisiana, with an elevation of 535 ft (163 m) above sea level. It lies about 5.3 mi (8.5 km) southeast of Bryceland, in Bienville Parish. A large pile of rocks marks the high point. When comparing the highest point of elevation in each state, this mountain places Louisiana at third lowest - only Florida (Britton Hill) and Delaware (Ebright Azimuth) have lower highest points of elevation.

== Description ==
Driskill Mountain is a landform created by the erosion of unlithified Paleogene sediment. Its summit consists of nonmarine quartz sands of the Cockfield Formation. These sands overlie shallow marine and coastal clays, silts, and sands of the Cook Mountain Formation, which form the bulk of Driskill Mountain.

Mountaintop flora include wild azalea and dogwood.

== History ==
The mountain was named for James Christopher Driskill, who was born in Henry County, Georgia, on June 27, 1817. In 1840, he married the former Eugenia Irwin Walker. In October 1859, Driskill sold his land in Troup County, Georgia, and moved his family, which by then consisted of his wife, eight boys, and one girl, to Louisiana. By December 1859, Driskill had purchased in Louisiana 324 acres (1.31 km^{2}), which included Driskill Mountain. During the American Civil War, Driskill served in the Home Guard. His eldest son, William B. Driskill, was killed in action at the Battle of the Wilderness in Virginia on May 5, 1864. Another one of his sons, James B. Driskill, disappeared after he had left Louisiana to fight in the Civil War. Except for one son and daughter, Driskill's family remained in Bienville Parish, and his descendants still live in the area.

Jimmie Davis and his band played You Are My Sunshine at the summit. Davis became governor of Louisiana just five years after the performance and the song became the state song of Louisiana.

== See also ==
- List of U.S. states by elevation
