= Sugarloaf Mountain (Florida) =

Mountain in Lake County, Florida

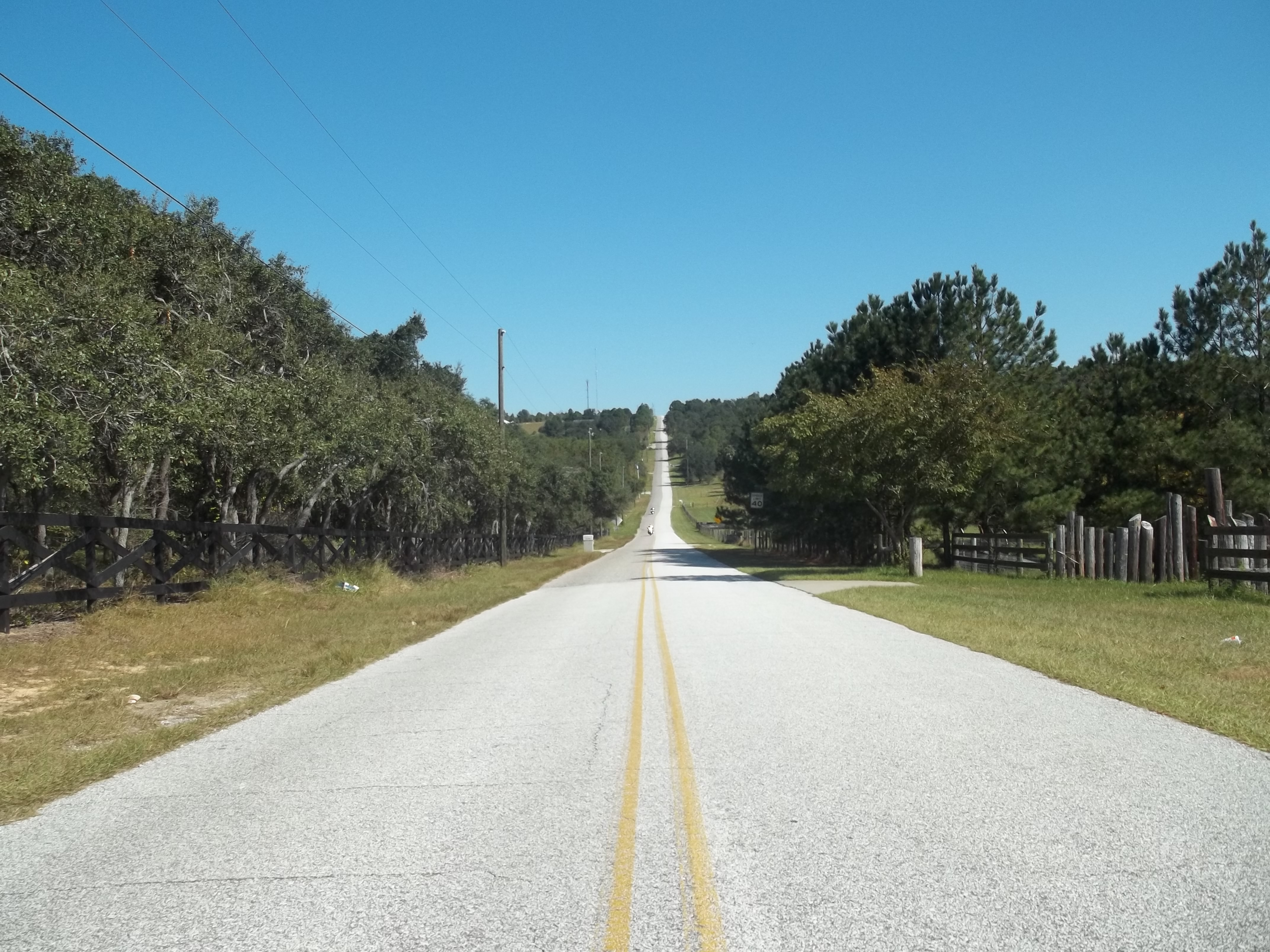
- Road leading to the summit of Sugarloaf Mountain

Highest point
- Elevation: 312 ft (95 m)
- Prominence: 245 ft (75 m)
- Listing: Florida's Highest Points
- Coordinates: 28°38′58″N 81°43′59″W

Geography
- Location within Florida
- Location: Lake County, Florida, United States
- Parent range: Lake Wales Ridge
- Topo map: USGS Astatula

Geology
- Rock age: ~20,000,000 years
- Mountain type: uplifted coastline

Climbing
- Easiest route: Hike, road

Sugarloaf Mountain is the fifth-highest named point and the most prominent point in the U.S. state of Florida. At 312 feet (95 m) above sea level it is also the highest point on the geographic Florida Peninsula. The hill is in Lake County, near the city of Clermont.

== Geography ==
Sugarloaf Mountain, located along the western shore of Lake Apopka in Lake County, Florida, is the northernmost named upland associated with the Lake Wales Ridge, a series of sand hills running south to Highlands County. The mountain, really a ridge with rolling dome-like peaks, rises abruptly from the surrounding flat terrain. Its prominence is thought to be 245 feet (75 m), with its highest peak having a local prominence of about 200 feet (61 m) relative to the surrounding ridge. Sugarloaf Mountain's summit is the most prominent peak in the state, though it is about 10 percent lower than Florida's highest point, Britton Hill, which rises to 345 feet (105 m) above sea level in the Florida Panhandle.

Sugarloaf is more prominent than the most prominent hills in Louisiana or Delaware, two other low-lying states.

== History ==
Before the 20th century, Sugarloaf Mountain was a wilderness dominated by sandhill and flatwood pine forests. By the 1920s, logging had stripped the mountain of its hardwood vegetation, permanently altering its native environment. Scrub began to grow on the mountain's slopes, in addition to grapes, which were planted mostly to the south of the mountain for a decade or so.

By the 1940s, grape farming had declined because of fungal diseases, and it was replaced by citrus farming. Citrus groves flourished on the flanks of Sugarloaf Mountain, providing the basis for the local economy until the 1980s, when freezes began to devastate local groves. As the citrus industry faded, property on the mountain was rezoned for residential development, with value seen in the mountain's panoramic views of the surrounding area. Other lands abutting the mountain, primarily along Lake Apopka, were preserved with the intention of restoring long-absent ecologies. Only a few citrus plantations and vineyards managed to persist to the present day.

== Geology ==
Sugarloaf Mountain's geology is tied to the formation of Florida's sand ridges, specifically the Lake Wales Ridge. The mountain consists of relict sand ridges and dunes formed in a marine shoreline environment about 2 million years ago during the Pleistocene epoch. Since the Pleistocene, the sands comprising the mountain have probably been uplifted due to isostatic rebound of the crust beneath the Florida Platform. The uplift is attributed to the karstification/erosion of the platform, which is reducing the weight on the underlying basement rock, triggering a process similar to post-glacial rebound.

== Recreation ==
The state of Florida designated the Green Mountain Scenic Byway, which primarily traverses the eastern side of the mountain. The route offers panoramic views of the surrounding landscape and access to newly acquired ecological preserves and historic sites.

Biking along the Byway as well as on other roads on the mountain has become popular, due to the challenge imposed by the relatively rugged terrain of the mountain compared to the surrounding area.

Sugarloaf Mountain also had a golf course. Designed by the firm of Coore & Crenshaw to take advantage of the relatively prominent topography, the course was to be part of the proposed private Sugarloaf Mountain Golf Club residential development. The golf course was closed in 2012 due to low turnout and slow development in the wake of the 2008 housing bubble.

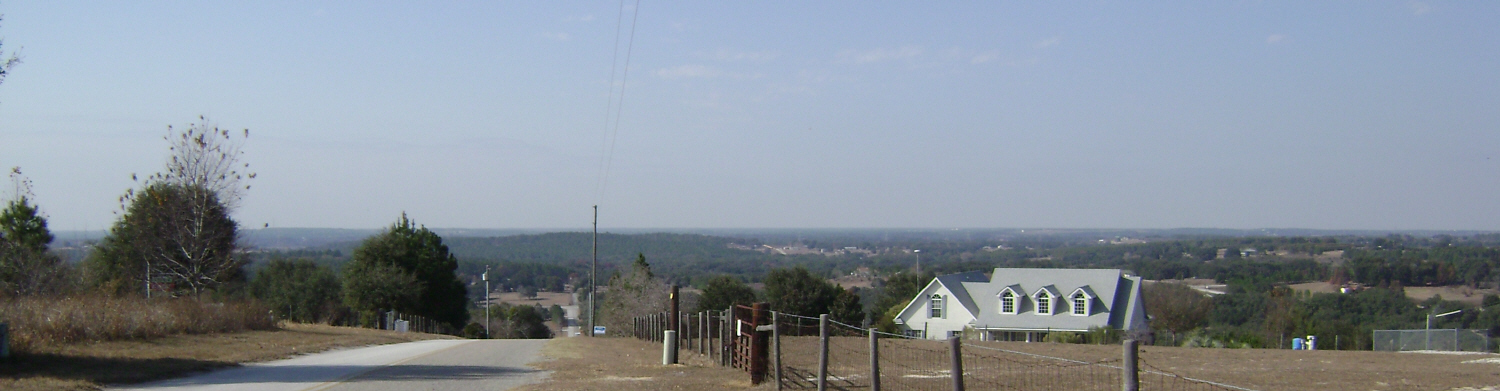
View of the western horizon from the summit of Sugarloaf Mountain

== Mentions in fiction ==
In the speculative fiction novel American War by Omar El Akkad, Sugarloaf Mountain is turned into an island by climate change related flooding; it is repurposed as a Guantanamo Bay-esque detention facility in a Second American Civil War.
