= American War (novel) =

2017 novel by Omar El Akkad

- First edition
- Author: Omar El Akkad
- Language: English
- Genre: Science fiction, war
- Publisher: Alfred A. Knopf
- Publication date: April 4, 2017
- Publication place: United States of America
- Media type: Print (Softcover)
- ISBN: 978-1-5098-5220-8

American War is the first novel by the Egyptian-Canadian journalist Omar El Akkad. It is set in the United States in the near future, ravaged by climate change and disease, in which the Second Civil War has broken out over the use of fossil fuels.

The plot is told by using historiographic metafiction by the future historian Benjamin Chestnut about his aunt, Sarat Chestnut, a climate refugee who is pushed out of Louisiana by the war. The narrative chapters are interspersed with fictional primary documents collected by the narrator.

The novel was generally well received and was nominated for several "first book" awards.

== Plot ==
In 2074, after the passage of the Sustainable Future Act, a bill in the United States that banned the use of fossil fuels anywhere in the country and was the catalyst for the assassination of the President of the United States in December 2073 in Jackson, Mississippi by a secessionist suicide bomber, Mississippi, Alabama, Georgia, South Carolina, and Texas secede from the Union, starting the Second American Civil War. South Carolina is quickly incapacitated by a virus released by the U.S. government known as "The Slow", a biological weapon that makes its inhabitants lethargic. Texas is invaded and occupied by Mexico, and the remaining bloc, known as the "Free Southern States" (Mississippi, Alabama, and Georgia, or "The Mag"), continues to fight. The novel is told from the point of view of Sarat (Sara T. Chestnut) and her nephew, Benjamin.

Sarat is six years old when the war breaks out. She lives with her family on the coast ravaged by climate change in Louisiana. Her family consists of her parents, Benjamin and Martina; her older brother, Simon; and her fraternal twin sister, Dana Chestnut. After Sarat's father is killed during a terrorist suicide bombing in Baton Rouge in 2075, Sarat and her family relocate to a refugee camp called "Camp Patience", on the Mississippi–Tennessee border.

Sarat and her family spend the next six years living a squalid existence at Camp Patience. In 2081, when Sarat is 12 years old, she befriends the charismatic Albert Gaines, a recruiter for the Southern rebels. Gaines introduces her to Joe, an agent of the Bouazizi Empire, an emerging union of North African and Middle Eastern states based in Cairo, who helps deliver aid to the Free Southern States to keep the United States weak and divided. Later, a federal militia unit attacks Camp Patience and massacres many of the refugees, killing Sarat's mother and wounding her brother.

Following the Camp Patience massacre, Sarat and her siblings are resettled by the Free Southern government in Lincolnton, Georgia, on the border with South Carolina. The two sisters are joined by Simon, who is suffering from a bullet wound to the brain. Five years later, in 2086, the Chestnut siblings settle in to their new lives. While Sarat has become a member of Gaines' rebel group, the broken Simon is tended by a Bangladeshi American woman, named Karina. As time passes, Simon and Karina develop romantic feelings for each other.

During a guerrilla operation near a U.S. base along the Georgia-Tennessee border, Sarat assassinates General Joseph Weiland, a prominent U.S. commander. While Sarat is hailed as a hero by the Free Southern States, Weiland's assassination only hardens the U.S. government's resolve to end the Southern rebellion and leads to a crackdown against the Southern guerrillas. Sarat eventually grows disillusioned with the corrupt and self-serving Southern leadership. Later, Dana is killed when a rogue drone bombs a bus in which she is traveling.

Sarat is later captured by U.S. forces and imprisoned at the Sugarloaf Detention Facility, in the Florida Sea. Sarat later learns her mentor Gaines betrayed her to the U.S. For the next seven years, Sarat is repeatedly tortured, including being subjected to waterboarding. To end the torment, Sarat confesses to numerous exaggerated charges. Sarat is later released after the U.S. government deems Gaines to be an unreliable source.

Years later, Simon has married Karina, and they have a son, Benjamin. In 2095, the 6-year-old Benjamin meets his aunt, Sarat, who settles down on Benjamin's homestead. Sarat is later visited by one of her former rebel comrades, who informs her that his group has captured Bud Baker, one of her former Sugarloaf captors who tortured her. Sarat kills Bud but decides to spare his family after she discovers that his two teenage sons are twins.

Back at Simon's household, tensions between Sarat and Karina rise after Benjamin sustains a broken arm, and Sarat binds it with a crude splint. Benjamin is intrigued by Sarat and realizes that his aunt is still haunted by the attack at Camp Patience, her time as an insurgent, and her torture at Sugarloaf. As his arm recovers, Benjamin becomes friendly with his aunt.

Sarat is later visited by Joe, the Bouazizi agent, who recruits her into carrying a deadly virus during the Reunification Ceremony in the U.S. capital of Columbus, Ohio. Joe reveals that his real name is Yousef Bin Rashid, and the Bouazizi Empire wants to prevent the re-emergence of the U.S. as a superpower leaving the Bouazizi Empire and the People's Republic of China as the preeminent global powers. Seeking revenge against the U.S. government, Sarat accepts the offer and convinces her former rebel comrades to secure her passage to the Reunification Ceremony. Before leaving, Sarat visits the crippled Gaines at his cabin but leaves without killing him. She also arranges for her associates to smuggle her nephew Benjamin to safety in New Anchorage, Alaska. Later, Sarat infiltrates the Reunification Ceremony. While entering, she briefly encounters one of Baker's teenage sons whom she had spared; he now works as a guard there. He allows her in upon recognizing her without requesting any proper ID. The resulting "Reunification Plague" kills 110 million people and devastates the country, which is already war-torn.

The orphaned Benjamin settles to his new life in New Anchorage and becomes a respected historian. Decades later, Benjamin discovers his aunt's diaries and learns of her experiences during the Second American Civil War and her role in the Reunification Plague. To spite his aunt, Benjamin burns her diaries but keeps one page as a memento.

=== Setting ===
Much of the novel is set in the "Free Southern States", which originally consisted of Mississippi, Alabama, Georgia, South Carolina, and Texas. The U.S. is split between parts of the old southeastern states and the remaining northern and western states. At the outset of the war, Mexico occupied and annexed large portions of California, Nevada, Utah, Arizona, New Mexico, and Texas, which were previously Mexican territory. Other secessionist movements are mentioned: Northern California, Oregon, Washington, and parts of Canada are in talks to form Cascadia. The novel is interspersed with several "in-universe" historical documents, interviews, and media reports.

The "Second American Civil War" lasts between 2074 and 2095. The conflict started after the assassination of President Daniel Ki during an attack in Jackson, Mississippi in 2073 by a suicide bomber disguised as a pregnant women, as well as the shooting of Southern protesters outside Fort Jackson, South Carolina by U.S. Marines in 2074. After five years of conventional warfare around the borders of the Free Southern States, rebel "insurrectionists" wage guerrilla warfare against U.S. forces. Internally displaced Southerners are moved to "Camp Patience", which is later destroyed by U.S.-aligned militia, a reference to the Sabra and Shatila massacre. Following a protracted negotiation process, the war is settled in favor of the United States. However, a "secessionist terrorist" (later revealed to be the protagonist Sarat) releases a biological agent, known as the "Reunification Plague", during the Reunification Day Ceremony in Columbus, Ohio, which spreads across the country and kills 110 million people. Refugees flee to New Anchorage as the country begins the long process of "reconstruction". The Reunification Plague is also revealed to be the result of a failed attempt by the virologist Gerry Tusk to find a cure to "The Slow".

The rest of the world has also seen geopolitical change. After multiple failed revolutions, the states of Northern Africa and portions of the Arab world and Central Asia have united as the Bouazizi Empire, with their capital in Cairo. China and the Bouazizi nations have emerged as the world's dominant economies, and the European migrant crisis has reversed, with refugees from the collapsed European Union fleeing across the Mediterranean to North Africa. In a reversal of great power politics, China and the Bouazizi Empire send aid to the war-torn United States. The Bouazizi Empire also secretly channels funding and other material support to the Free Southern States in an attempt to destabilize the United States, which it regards as a rival to its imperial ambitions. Russia is said to have undertaken a period of aggressive expansion and to have renamed itself as the Russian Union.

Climate change also has a significant impact on the world. Florida is inundated by rising sea levels and exists only as a small archipelago. In a reference to Guantánamo Bay's Camp X-Ray, Florida's Sugarloaf Mountain has been repurposed as a detention facility. Much of Louisiana is underwater, and New Orleans is entirely abandoned. After intense migration inland from the flooded Eastern Seaboard, the U.S. capital is relocated to Columbus, Ohio. The Arabian Peninsula is too hot to support permanent human habitation and is instead devoted to solar power production. Simon's wife, Karina, is said to have been born in the Bangladeshi Isles, which suggests extensive flooding in South Asia.

== Reception ==
In The New York Times, book critic Michiko Kakutani compared it favorably to Cormac McCarthy's The Road and Philip Roth's novel The Plot Against America. She wrote that "badly melodramatic" dialogue could be forgiven by the use of details that makes the fictional future "seem alarmingly real".

The novel was shortlisted for the 2017 Rogers Writers' Trust Fiction Prize and the 2018 Amazon.ca First Novel Award. It also was a finalist for the 2018 Arthur C. Clarke Award, and was one of five books in the finals of the 2018 Canada Reads contest, placing fourth.

In November 2019, a panel of six writers, curators and critics selected by the BBC News included American War among a list of 100 novels that have had an impact on their lives.

In April 2025, then-New York City mayoral candidate Zohran Mamdani said American War had impacted him: "a book written about the terrifying prospect of a civil war in our country, and it had this line that said, 'What is safety but the sound of bombs dropping on someone else's home?'"
