= Cody Scarp =

Geologial feature in northern Florida

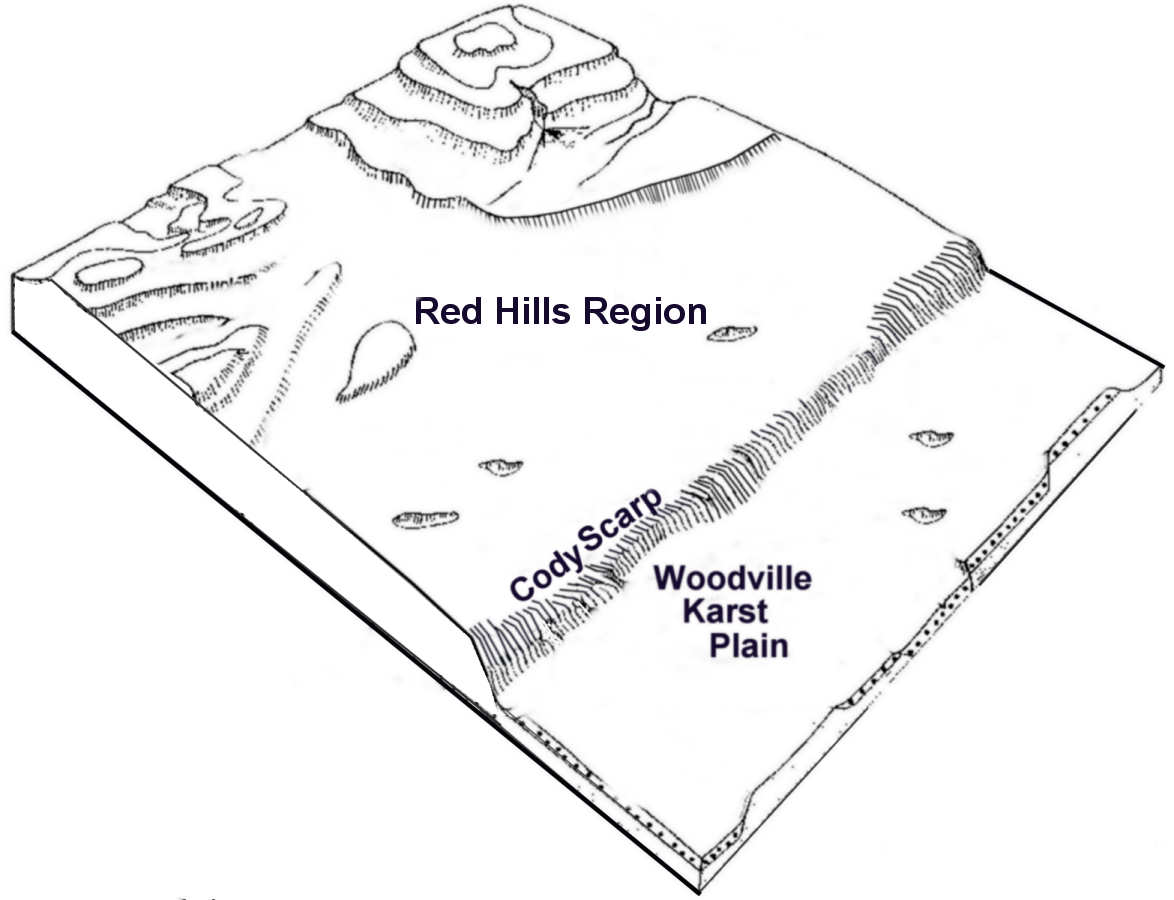
Diagram showing the Cody Scarp

The Cody Scarp or Cody Escarpment is located in north and north central Florida United States. It is a relict scarp and ancient persistent topographical feature formed from an ancient early Pleistocene shorelines of ~1.8 million to 10,000 years BP during interglacial periods. The Cody Scarp has a slope of 5% to 12%.

== Description ==
The Cody Scarp runs from just east of the Apalachicola River to central Alachua County. It is the boundary over that range between the Gulf Coastal Lowlands and the Northern Highlands of Florida. The Gulf Coast Lowlands have only a thin layer of soil over limestone, while the Northern Highlands consist of plateaus of sand, clay and carbonate rock. The scarp rises about 100 feet (30 m) from the Gulf Coastal Lowlands to the Northern Highlands. The Cody Scarp and the Gulf Coastal Lowlands are karst landscapes, with many sinkholes, springs, underground streams, and related features.

The Cody Scarp was defined in 1964 as following the currently accepted track from the Apalachicola River to Alachua County, and then eastward from the end of the Alachua Karst Hills to the southern end of the Trail Ridge, and northward along the eastern side of the Trail Ridge to the Georgia state line at the St. Marys River. The extension east of the Alachua Karst Hills to Trail Ridge is no longer treated as part of the Cody Scarp. The scarp is named for Cody, a community in Jefferson County.

The Cody Scarp has been produced by erosion from a combination of marine, fluvial, and dissolution forces acting over hundreds of thousands of years. The toe of the scarp has been shaped by marine erosion during periods when the sea level stood higher. The toe of the scarp shows a marked rise in elevation from the adjoining lowlands. While the lowlands below the scarp are relatively flat and have abundant small sinkholes, sinkholes in the scarp are larger, and the land has more relief. The top of the scarp gradually transitions to a flatter landscape with fewer, smaller sinkholes, it any. The width of the scarp from toe to top varies from less than 1 mile (1.6 km) to about 10 miles (16 km).

The Cody Scarp has two distinct segments, an eastern segment running southeast to northwest from central Alachua County to northern Suwannee County in which fluvial and dissolution erosion processes have dominated, and a western segment running east to west from the Alapaha River to the Apalachicola River, in which marine erosion processes have been important.

== Eastern segment ==
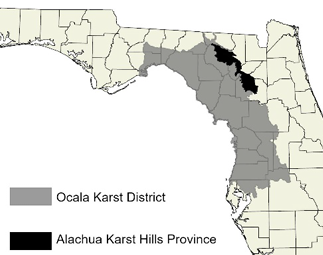
Alachua Karst Hills geomorphological province or eastern Cody Scarp

The eastern segment of the Cody Scarp has a low slope and highly varied topography, and is generally 10 to 20 miles (16 to 32 km) wide from toe to top. It has been designated the Alachua Karst Hills geomorphological province by the Florida Geological Survey. It includes parts of central and northern Alachua County, westernmost Bradford and Union counties, central and southern Columbia County, and northern Suwannee County. The topography of the province is dominated by karst features such as sinkholes, uvalas, and poljes, produced by the dissolution of limestone underlying the province. The province averages 125 feet (38 m) above mean sea level (MSL), with the toe of the scarp reaching as low as 40 feet (12 m) MSL, and the top up to 200 feet (61 m) MSL.

The entire province is underlain by the Ocala Limestone. The Suwannee Limestone lies on the Ocala Limestone in the northwestern part of the province. Dissolution of those limestones is responsible for the karst features in the province. Northeast of the Alachua Karst Hills is the Okefenokee Basin geomorphological district, a relatively flat land with no significant karst features. Formations above the limestone in the Okefenokee Basin District that are exposed in the Alachua Karst Hills include the Statenville and Coosawhatchee formations of the Hawthorn Group, undifferentiated Hawthorn Group deposits, and undifferentiated siliciclastic sediments of the Tertiary and Quaternary periods. At its southeast end the Alachua Karst Hills province borders the Hawthone Lakes geomorphological province. The Branford and Williston karst plains are on the southwest flank of the Alachua Karst Hills. While those provinces also have karst features, the sinkholes are smaller than in the Alachua Karst Hills because the sediment over the limestone is much thinner.

Streams flowing from the Alachua Karst Hills towards the Branford and Williston karst plains, and a few streams flowing north towards the Suwannee River valley, typically go underground at swallets near the borders between provinces. There are many small drainage basins in the province, each draining into a sinkhole or swallet. Individual sinkhole and swallets may overflow in high water flow conditions, connecting several into ephemeral streams. The province is a significant recharge area for the Floridan Aquifer. The Alachua Karst Hills are home to several prominent karst features. The Devil's Millhopper is a large (120 feet (37 m) deep and 500 feet (150 m) across) rock-collapse sinkhole. Hogtown Creek, which drains parts of Gainesville, enters several swallets before ending in the Hogtown Prairie Polje in the Williston Karst Plain. Alligator Lake, a sinkhole lake in Lake City, and Harris Lake, a polje in Lake City, have periodically flooded and then drained into the Floridan Aquifer. The Sanchez Prairie in San Felasco Hammock is a polje more than 50 feet (15 m) lower than the surrounding land.

== Western segment ==
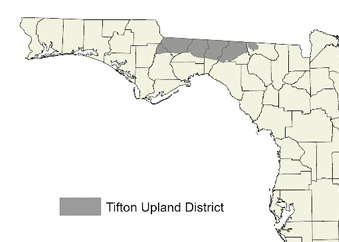
The western segment of the Cody Scarp forms the southern boundary of the Tifton Upland geomorphological district.

The scarp, at 42.6 to 45.7 meters (140 to 150 feet) above sea level, is most prominent in Leon County, Florida where it runs east to west. It is a remnant of two Pleistocene interglacial shorelines. The first shoreline is known as the Okefenokee Terrace. The second is known as the Wicomico Terrace.

In Jefferson County to the east, the scarp coincides with the Wicomico Terrace with an elevation at 40–45 feet above mean sea level.

The scarp near Wacissa may be the section most clearly shaped by marine erosional processes. This is in the segment of the scarp that separates the Tallahassee Hills from the Woodville Karst Plain. The toe of the scarp is about 50 feet (15 m) above MSL and the crest is 125 feet (38 m) above MSL. To the east, where the scarp separates the Madison Hills from the Branford and Perry karst plain provinces and the San Pedro Bay province, the scarp is less distinct and somewhat more shaped by fluvial and dissolution erosion. The toe of the scarp in this area is about 75 feet (23 m) above MSL and the crest is 125 feet (38 m) above MSL.

The scarp separates the Hawthorn Group of fine to medium grained sandy clays and silty, clayey sands of the Red Hills Region of north Florida and southwest Georgia to the north from the fine to medium fine grained, partially recrystallized, silty to sandy limestones of the Gulf Coastal Lowlands to the south. A dramatic difference in elevation is seen here as the Red Hills, at a maximum of 70 meters (230 feet) above MSL, drops to the area known as the Woodville Karst Plain, an elevation of 50 to 80 feet (15 to 24 meters) within 15 miles (24 km).

On the Woodville Karst Plain, the Suwannee Limestone of the Floridan Aquifer is shallow and exposed in many places. This is the primary recharge area for Wakulla Springs and where the aquifer is most vulnerable to pollution on the land surface. It is also a zone of high sinkhole activity.

In Alachua County, Florida this westward-facing escarpment between an upland plateau to the east and a karst plain to the west has elevations up to 190 feet (58 meters) mean sea level (MSL). The Cody Scarp runs right through Gainesville, Florida.

== See also ==
- List of escarpments

== Sources ==
- |Green, Richard C.; Paul, David T.; Scott, Thomas M. (2008). Text to accompany geologic map of the western portion of the USGS Perry 30 x 60 minute quadrangle, northern Florida (PDF) (Report). Florida Geological Survey. pp. 8–10, 15. ISSN 1058-1391.
- Williams, Christopher P.; Scott, Thomas M.; Upchurch, Sam B. (2022). Florida Geomorphology Atlas. Special Publication 59 (Report). Tallahassee, Florida: Florida Geological Survey.
