= Alachua Trail =

The Alachua Trail was used by tribes in what is now Florida to transit areas from the Altamaha River in what is now Georgia south to what is now Alachua County. Much of it has been lost to time.

It was used by hunters and traders. An 1880 article in Lippincott's Monthly Magazine stated it "may well be the oldest and the most adventure-fraught thoroughfare in the United States."

It ran north to south while the El Camino Real, succeeded by Bellamy Road, was east-west. The trails intersected.

Construction of Kings Road by the British may have utilized sections of it.

It was used to mark county boundaries in Florida.

== See also ==
- Trail Ridge
- Payne's Prairie
- Alachua culture
- Alachua Formation
