= Paxton, Florida =

Town in the state of Florida, United States

- Town
- Town of Paxton
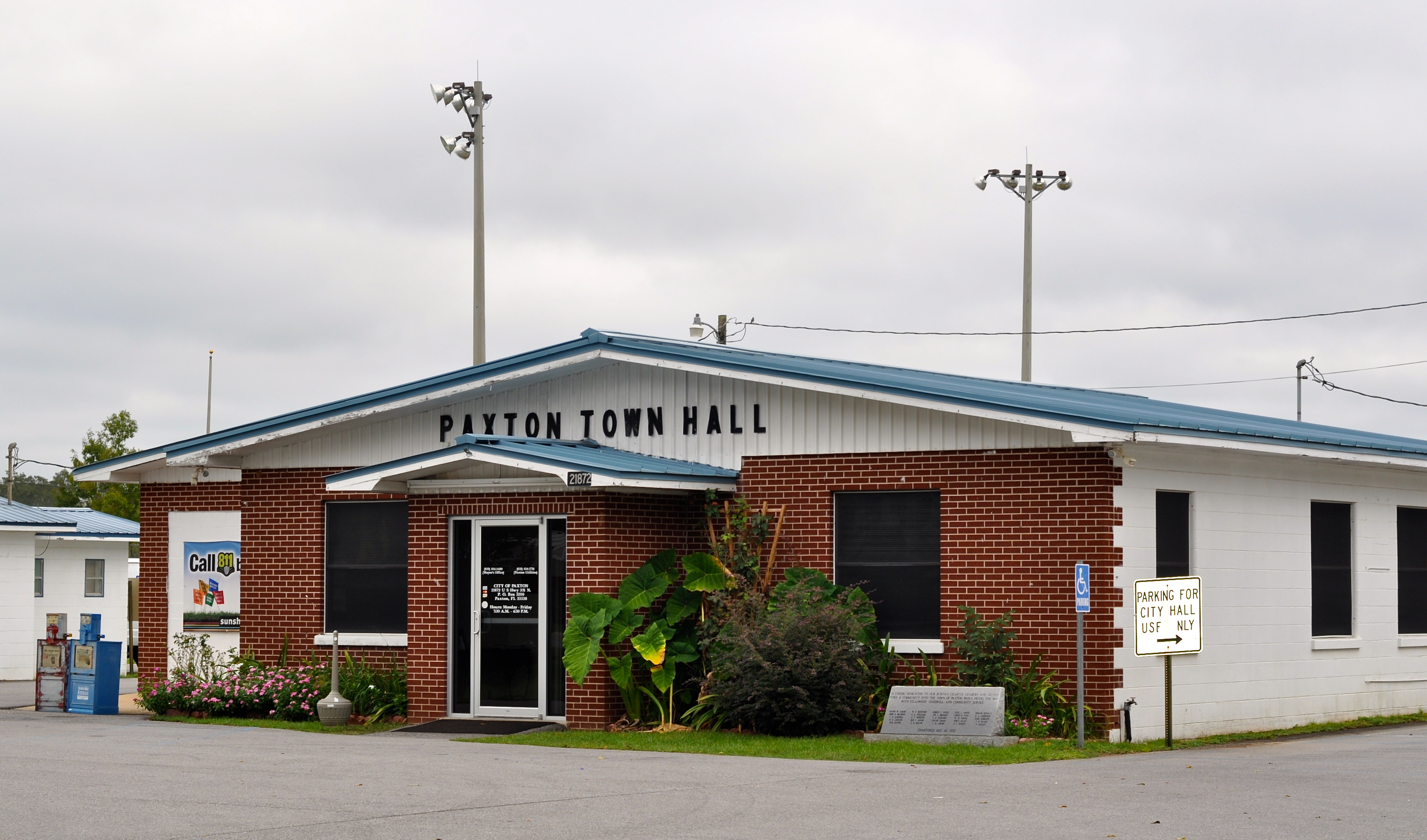
- Paxton City Hall, September 2014

- Seal

- Location in Walton County and the state of Florida
- Coordinates: 30°58′28″N 86°18′36″W
- Country: United States
- State: Florida
- County: Walton
- Settled: 1903
- Incorporated: 1952

Government
  - Type: Mayor-Council
  - Mayor: Donna Smith
  - Chairman: Jenice Armstrong
  - Council Members: Douglas Constantine, Jackie Carnley, Perry Thomas, and Co-Chair; Travis McMillan
  - Town Clerk: Tori Hinson
  - Town Attorney: Clayton J.M. Adkinson

Area
  - Total: 4.01 sq mi (10.38 km^{2})
  - Land: 3.72 sq mi (9.64 km^{2})
  - Water: 0.28 sq mi (0.73 km^{2})
- Elevation: 312 ft (95 m)

Population (2020)
  - Total: 556
  - Density: 149.3/sq mi (57.65/km^{2})
- Time zone: UTC-6 (Central (CST))
  - Summer (DST): UTC-5 (CDT)
- ZIP code: 32538
- Area codes: 850, 448
- FIPS code: 12-55475
- GNIS feature ID: 2407083
- Website: paxtonfl.net

Paxton is a town in Walton County, Florida, United States. Located near Britton Hill on the Alabama–Florida state line, it has the highest elevation of any incorporated municipality in Florida. Paxton is located in the Florida Panhandle, and is part of the Crestview–Fort Walton Beach–Destin, Florida Metropolitan Statistical Area. The population was 556 at the 2020 census, down from 644 at the 2010 census.

== Geography ==
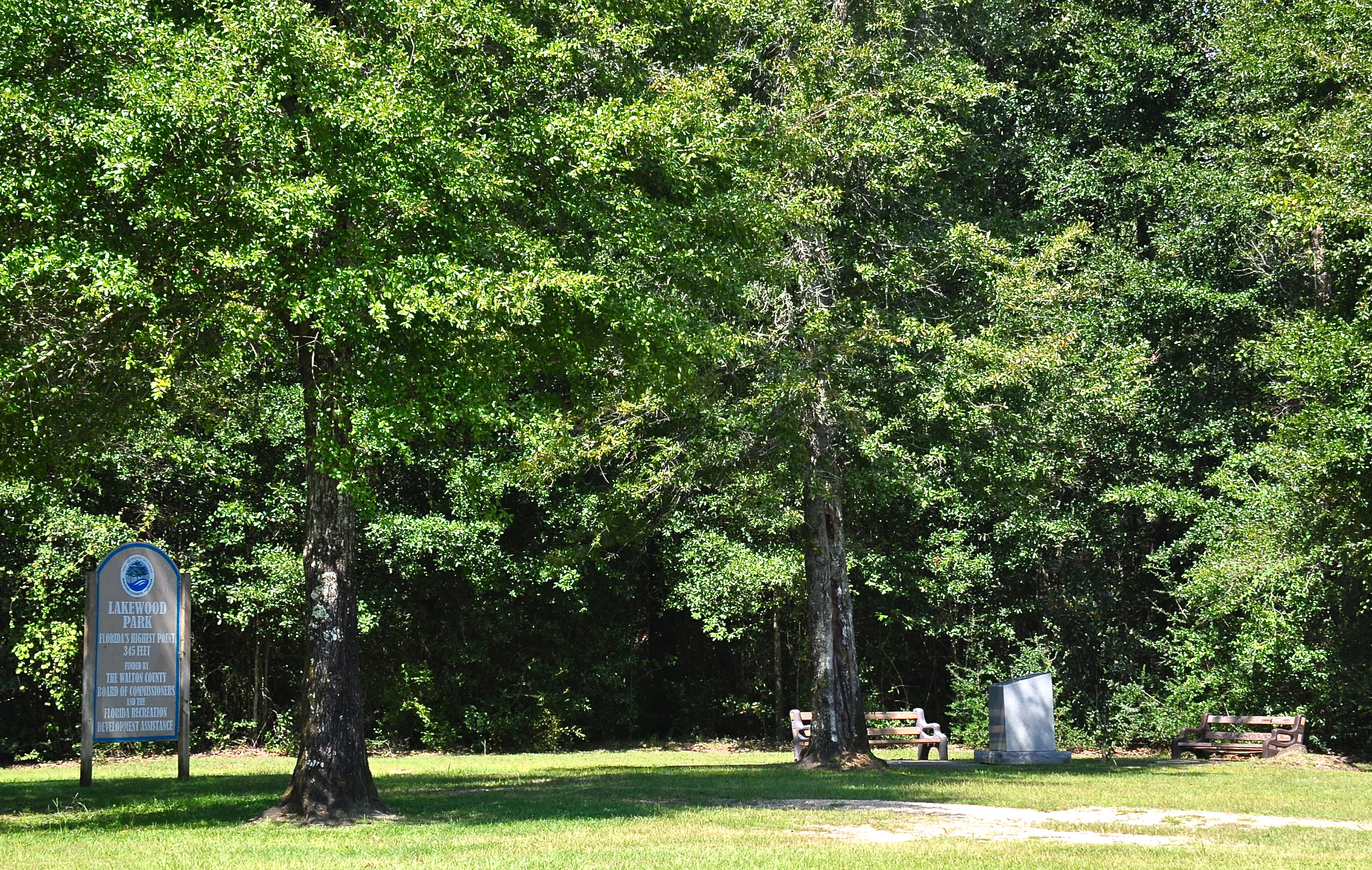
Britton Hill, which has the highest point in Florida at 345 feet (105 meters), is located near the Town of Paxton.

Paxton is on the state line with Alabama, being bordered by the town of Florala on the north.

The highest natural point in Florida, Britton Hill, is located close to the town limits.

According to the United States Census Bureau, the town has a total area of 4.0 square miles (10 km^{2}), of which 3.9 square miles (10 km^{2}) is land and 0.1 square miles (0.26 km^{2}) (1.76%) is water.

At an elevation of 318 feet (97 meters), Paxton is the highest incorporated municipality in Florida.

=== Climate ===
The climate in this area is characterized by hot, humid summers and generally mild winters. According to the Köppen climate classification, the Town of Paxton has a humid subtropical climate zone (Cfa).

== Demographics ==
Historical population
Census	Pop.	Note	%±
1960	215		—
1970	243		13.0%
1980	659		171.2%
1990	600		−9.0%
2000	656		9.3%
2010	644		−1.8%
2020	556		−13.7%
U.S. Decennial Census

=== 2010 and 2020 census ===
Paxton racial composition (Hispanics excluded from racial categories) (NH = Non-Hispanic)
Race	Pop 2010	Pop 2020	% 2010	% 2020
White (NH)	568	477	88.20%	85.79%
Black or African American (NH)	22	17	3.42%	3.06%
Native American or Alaska Native (NH)	17	14	2.64%	2.52%
Asian (NH)	3	0	0.47%	0.00%
Pacific Islander or Native Hawaiian (NH)	1	0	0.16%	0.00%
Some other race (NH)	2	4	0.31%	0.72%
Two or more races/Multiracial (NH)	15	24	2.33%	4.32%
Hispanic or Latino (any race)	16	20	2.48%	3.60%
Total	644	556		

As of the 2020 United States census, there were 556 people, 298 households, and 210 families residing in the town.

As of the 2010 United States census, there were 644 people, 295 households, and 183 families residing in the town.

=== 2000 census ===
At the 2000 census there were 656 people, 263 households, and 185 families in the town. The population density was 167.9 inhabitants per square mile (64.8/km^{2}). There were 298 housing units at an average density of 76.3 per square mile (29.5/km^{2}). The racial makeup of the town was 94.05% White, 1.68% African American, 2.90% Native American, 0.15% from other races, and 1.22% from two or more races. Hispanic or Latino of any race were 1.68%.

Of the 263 households in 2000, 28.5% had children under the age of 18 living with them, 51.7% were married couples living together, 13.7% had a female householder with no husband present, and 29.3% were non-families. 27.0% of households were one person and 12.9% were one person aged 65 or older. The average household size was 2.49 and the average family size was 2.96.

In 2000, the age distribution was 25.5% under the age of 18, 6.7% from 18 to 24, 25.2% from 25 to 44, 26.7% from 45 to 64, and 16.0% 65 or older. The median age was 39 years. For every 100 females, there were 88.0 males. For every 100 females age 18 and over, there were 82.5 males.

In 2000, the median income for a household in the town was $24,625, and the median family income was $35,000. Males had a median income of $25,781 versus $21,375 for females. The per capita income for the town was $14,108. About 7.1% of families and 12.3% of the population were below the poverty line, including 15.6% of those under age 18 and 12.1% of those age 65 or over.
