= High Hill (Florida) =

Hill in Florida, United States

Coordinates: 30°43′53″N 85°29′07″W

High Hill, at 323 feet (98.5 m) above sea level, is considered to be the third highest elevation in the state of Florida, USA. It is close to Oak Hill (331 ft), the state's second highest point.

High Hill is located three miles (5 km) north of Wausau, and four miles (6 km) east of Vernon. High Hill, Oak Hill, and the 250-foot-high (76 m) peak of Sand Mountain are located in Washington County.

The easiest way to get there is by car via Washington County Road 278.
