= Lakewood, Florida =

Unincorporated community in Florida, U.S.

Coordinates: 30.988557°N 86.2819°W

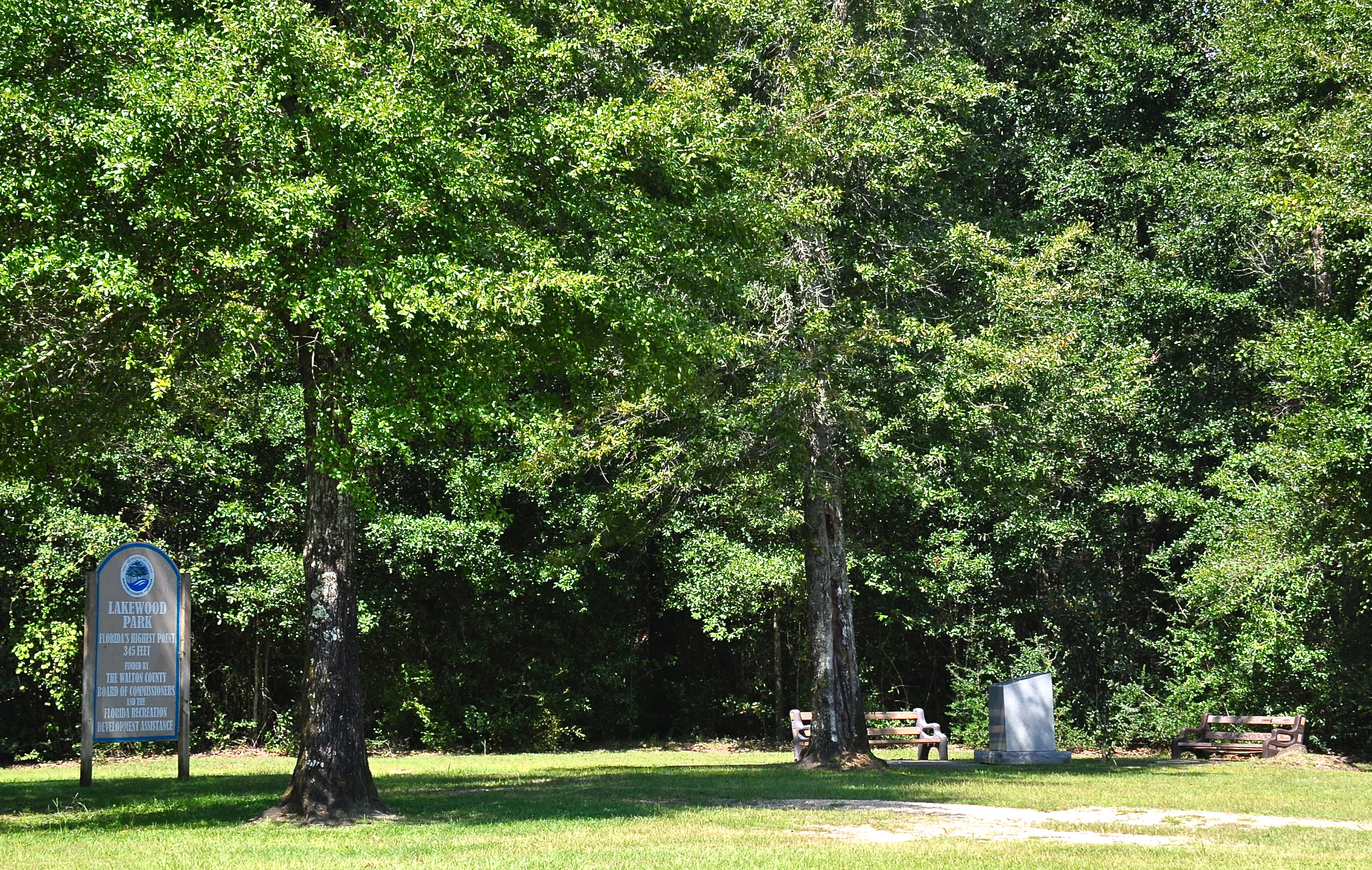
Britton Hill, the highest point in Florida, is located in Lakewood off of Walton County Road 285.

Lakewood is an unincorporated community in Walton County, Florida, United States, located in the Florida panhandle. Lakewood is on the Florida/Alabama border near Florida's highest point, Britton Hill (345 feet). Lakewood and most of Walton County differ from the rest of Florida in terms of scenery and geography, and the fauna and flora are those typical of the Deep South.
