= Sand Mountain (Florida) =

Mountain in Florida, United States

Coordinates: 30°33′33″N 85°31′34″W

At 76 meters (250 feet) above sea level, Sand Mountain is one of the highest points in the state of Florida. Sand Mountain is located near the Floridian town of Wausau.

The hill is located in Washington County, Florida and is about 16 kilometers (9.9 mi) southwest of Oak Hill, which is the second tallest point in Florida. Sand Mountain is located just off State Road 77.

== See also ==
- List of Florida's highest points
