= Northern Highlands of Florida =

Geomorphological region

The Northern Highlands of Florida is a physiographic region of the U.S. State of Florida defined in the mid-20th century. The extent of the region varied in different sources. It is no longer recognized as a defined region by the Florida Geological Survey.

== Definition ==
The Northern Highlands has been variously defined as the elevated land extending across the northern part of Florida from the Trail Ridge on the east to the valley of the Withlacoochee River on the west, from the Trail Ridge on the east to the valley of the Apalachicola River on the west, or from the Trail Ridge on the east to the border with Alabama on the Perdido River on the west, between the Cody Scarp on the south (and an analogous scarp in the western Florida panhandle) and the northern border of Florida.

The Northern Highlands east of the Withlacoochee River are described as markedly flat and gently falling northward toward the Okefenokee Basin, with the 10-to-15-mile (16 to 24 km) southwestern margin (from the toe to the top of the Cody Scarp) gently rolling and maturely dissected, and consisting of plateaus underlain by sand, clay and carbonate rock. The highest elevations in the eastern Northern Uplands are along the upper edge the Cody Scarp, which rises about 100 feet (30 m) from the Gulf Coastal Lowlands to the Northern Highlands. Streams on the flat portion of the highlands flow in shallow channels, while streams in the Cody Scarp are incised and frequently go underground. It is very common for streams in the Cody Scarp region to go underground for some distance before returning to the surface. The Suwannee River is the major exception to this phenomenon.

The Highlands west of the Apalachicola River were also, and still are, known as the Western Highlands of Florida, and the Highlands between the Apalachicola and Withlacoochee rivers were also known as the Tallahassee Hills (a name now used for only the central portion of that region).

== Current classification ==
=== East of the Alapaha River ===
The Florida Geological Survey no longer defines a Northern Highlands. The part of the Northern Highlands east of the Alapaha River is now classified as the Okefenokee Basin District while the part between the Alapaha River and the Apalachicola River is now classified as the Tipton Upland District. The Trail Ridge has been placed in the Barrier Island Sequence District, which consists primarily of geomorphological provinces shaped by coastal processes. The Cody Scarp on the southwest margin of the Okefenokee Basin District has a shallow slope making it 10 to 15 miles (16 to 24 km) wide, and has been designated the Alachua Karst Hills province in the Ocala Karst District.

The Okefenokee Basin District is the southern part of the Okefenokee Basin, which extends into Georgia and encompasses the Okefenokee Swamp. The district is bound in Florida on the east by the Trail Ridge District and on the southwest by the Alachua Karst Hills District. In Florida it includes parts of Alachua, Baker, Bradford, Columbia, and Union counties. The northeastern part is drained by the St. Marys River, the northwestern and central parts by the Suwannee River, and the southern part by the Santa Fe River (a tributary of the Suwannee). Geomorphological provinces in the Okefenokee Basin District include the Lake City Ridge, Ocean Pond Plain, and Raiford Ridges.

=== West of the Alapaha River ===
The Tipton Upland District includes a belt across northern Florida from the Apalachicola River on the west to the Alapaha River on the east, and from the Cody Scarp on the south into southwestern Georgia. In Florida it includes northernmost Liberty County, most of Gadsden County, the northern half of Leon County, the northern half of Jefferson County, northernmost Taylor County, most of Madison County, and northwestern Hamilton County. Geomorphological provinces in the Tipton Upland District in Florida include the Gadsden Hills, Madison Hills, and Tallahassee Hills.

The Highlands west of the Apalachicola River are divided by the Florida Geological Survey into the Dougherty Karst District and the Western Highlands Province of the Southern Pine Hills District. The Dougherty Karst District is on the crest and flanks of the Chattahoochee Anticline and includes all of Jackson County, most of Holmes and Washington counties, and parts of Bay, Calhoun, and Walton counties. The Western Highlands Province includes all but the southernmost parts of Escambia, Okaloosa, and Santa Rosa counties and parts of Holmes and Walton counties.

== Central Highlands of Florida ==
South of the eastern part of the Northern Highlands, the Central Highlands of Florida consists of a number of ridges and other elevated terrains extending down the center of the Florida peninsula. The various parts of the Central Highlands and the Northern Highlands may have once been a single contiguous elevated region that has been broken up into the current configuration by erosion and carbonate dissolution, and the eastern Northern Highlands have sometimes been defined as part of the Central Highlands. The Northern Highlands are separated from the northernmost elements of the Central Highlands by a few narrow gaps, including the 12-mile (19 km) wide High Springs Gap between the Cody Scarp and the northern end of the Brooksville Ridge, the 8-mile (13 km) wide Alachua Lake Cross Valley between the Cody Scarp and the Fairfield Karst Hills, and the 8-mile (13 km) wide Kenwood Gap between the southern end of the Trail Ridge and the northern end of the Mount Dora Ridge.

== Sources ==
- Schmidt, Walter (1997). "Geomorphology and Physiography of Florida". In Randazzo, Anthony F.; Jones, Douglas S. (eds.). The Geology of Florida. Gainesville, Florida: University Press of Florida. pp. 1–12. ISBN 9780813014968.
- Upchurch, Sam B. (September 2007). "An Introduction to the Cody Escarpment, North-Central Florida" (PDF). Live Oak, Florida: Suwannee River Water Management District.
- Upchurch, Sam; Scott, Thomas M.; Alfieri, Michael C.; Fratesi, Beth; Dobecki, Thomas L. (2019). "Geologic Framework of Florida". The Karst Systems of Florida. Cham: Springer International Publishing. pp. 59–91. doi:10.1007/978-3-319-69635-5_3. ISBN 978-3-319-69634-8.
- White, William A. (1970). The Geomorphology of the Florida Peninsula (Geological Bulletin No. 51) (Report). Tallahassee, Florida: Florida Bureau of Geology. pp=155-
- Williams, Christopher P.; Scott, Thomas M.; Upchurch, Sam B. (2022). Florida Geomorphology Atlas (PDF). Special Publication 59 (Report). Tallahassee, Florida: Florida Geological Survey.
