= Ebright Azimuth =

Hill in Delaware, United States

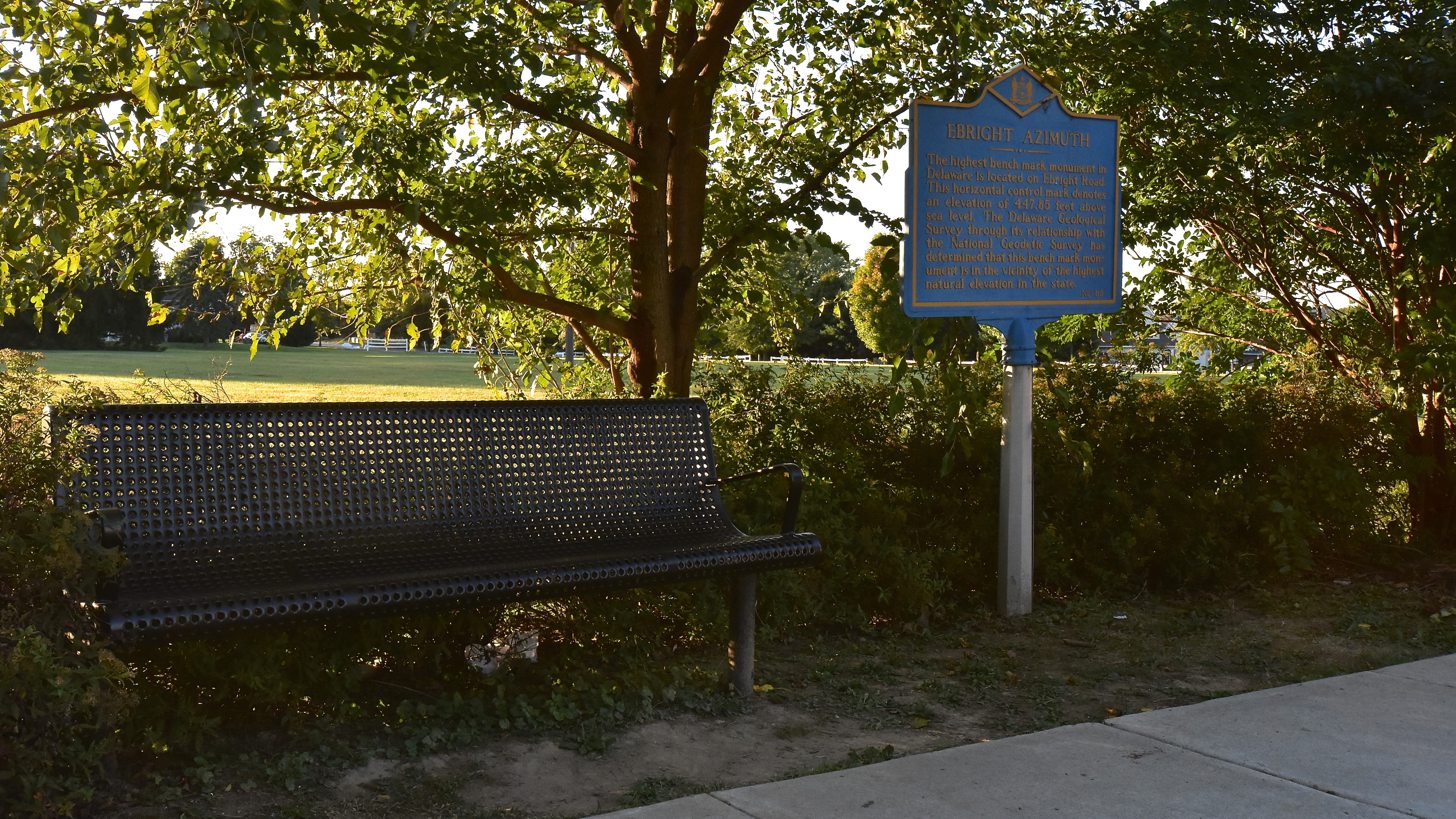
- The monument sign for Ebright Azimuth, the highest point in Delaware as of September 2016

Highest point
- Elevation: 448 ft (137 m)
- Prominence: 32 ft (9.8 m)
- Listing: U.S. state high point 49th
- Coordinates: 39°50′09″N 75°31′09″W

Geography
- Location within Delaware Location within the United States
- Location: New Castle County, Delaware, United States

Climbing
- Easiest route: Paved road

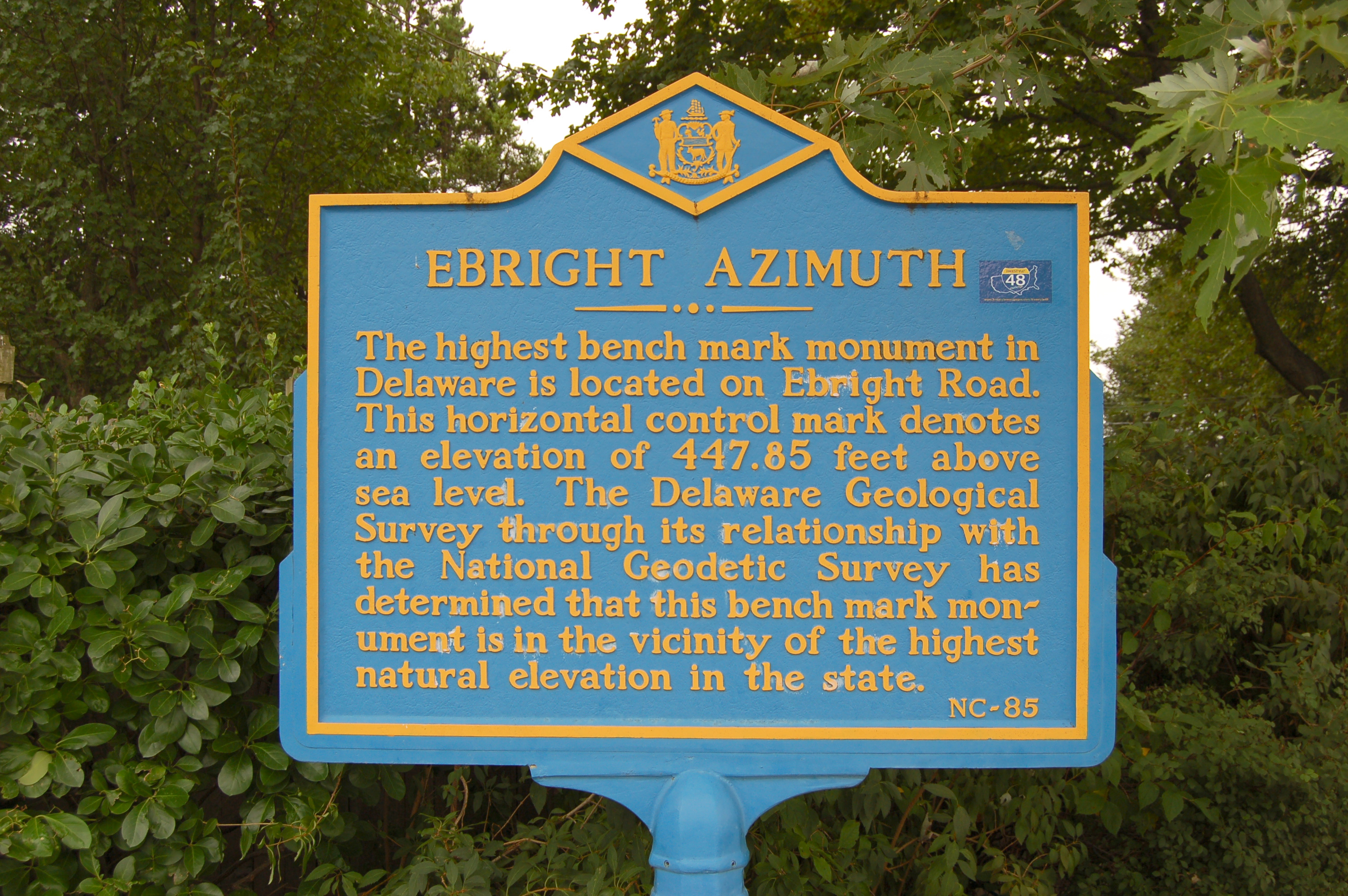
Elevation marker, August 2006

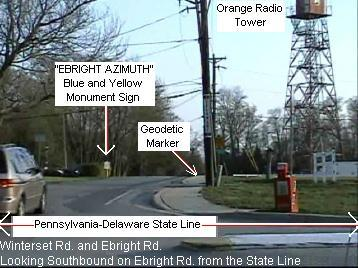
Southbound view of the peak of Ebright Azimuth from the state line, April 2006

The Ebright Azimuth is the point with the highest benchmark monument elevation in the U.S. state of Delaware. It is marked with a geodetic benchmark monument and has an elevation of 447.85 feet (136.50 m) above sea level. The only state high-point with a lower elevation is Britton Hill in the state of Florida at 345 feet (105 m) above sea level.

== Description ==
The Ebright Azimuth is located about 6.5 miles (10.5 km) north of downtown Wilmington, Delaware, in far northern New Castle County, approximately 500' horizontal distance from the Delaware-Pennsylvania border. It is near Concord High School, to the north of Naamans Road, at the middle of the intersection of Ebright Road and Ramblewood Drive. This is an entrance to the Dartmouth Woods neighborhood.

Surveying by Delaware Geological Survey personnel indicates that the mobile home park just west of Ebright Road is at least 2 feet (61 cm) higher than the benchmark.

Ebright Azimuth is named after James and Grant Ebright, who owned the property on which the benchmark was placed. An azimuth is an angular measurement in a spherical coordinate system.

Since the schematic photograph was taken the blue and yellow monument sign has been moved across the street closer to the geodetic marker. A curb extension has been installed, and the area around the sign has been modestly landscaped.

== Radio tower history ==
The self-supporting radio tower just south of the benchmark was constructed in 1947 by Western Union as part of a historic C-band microwave radio relay system that linked New York City and Washington, D.C. This site was assigned the name "Brandywine" in recognition of Brandywine Creek located several kilometers to the west and was licensed with the call sign KGB29. Western Union's engineers specified a heavy-duty prefabricated fire tower structure, which allowed the microwave transmitters and receivers to be installed inside the cab. "Dish" antennas, mounted behind the window openings, were aimed towards the adjacent relay stations at Mt. Laurel, New Jersey, 33.8 miles (54.4 km) to the northeast, and Elk Neck near Elkton, Maryland, 30.5 miles (49.1 km) to the southwest.

Like most of their early microwave relay sites, Western Union decommissioned the Brandywine installation near Ebright Azimuth as more-reliable broadband fiber systems were developed. The structure now supports several VHF and UHF land mobile radio antennas.

== See also ==
- List of U.S. states by elevation
