= Lake Wales Ridge =

Sand ridge in Central Florida

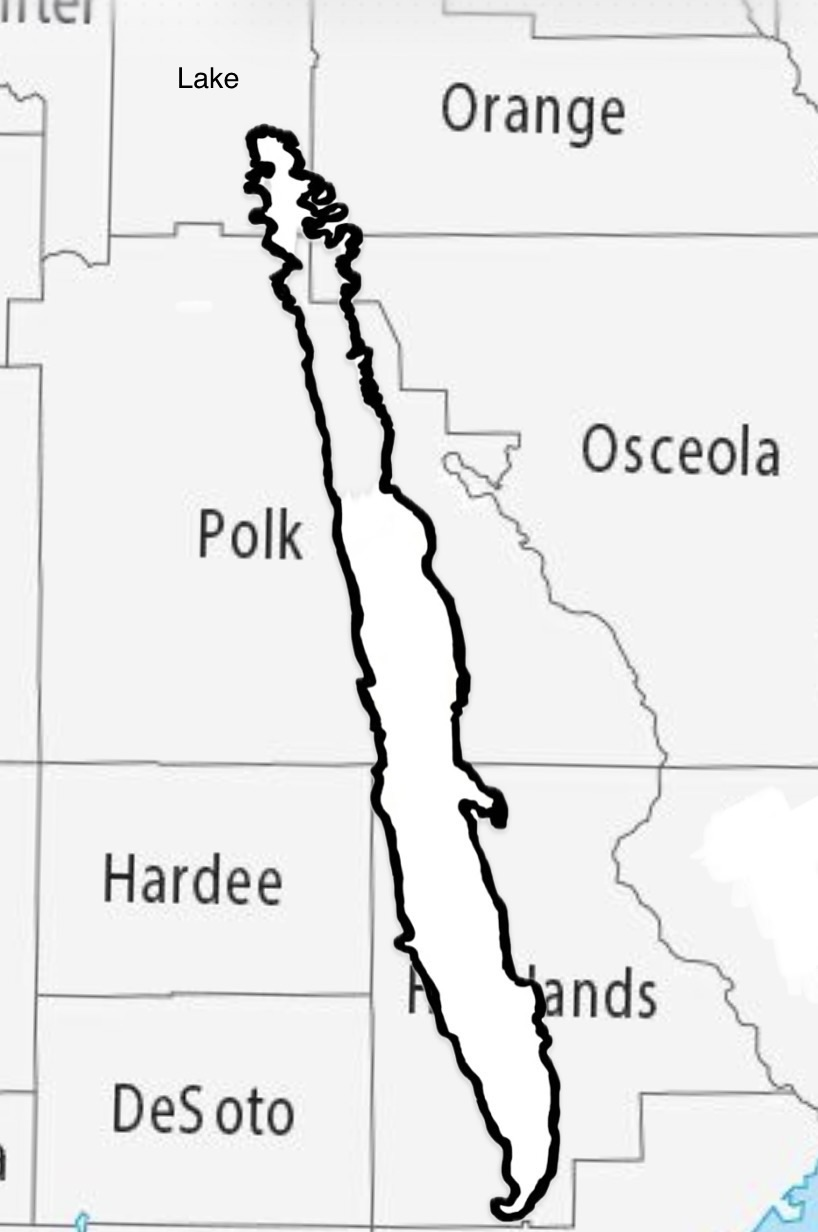
Map showing the Lake Wales Ridge formation. Does not include other ridges considered part of its complex.

The Lake Wales Ridge, sometimes referred to as the Mid-Florida Ridge, is a sandy ridge running for about 100 miles (160 km) south to north in Central Florida. Clearly viewable from satellite, the white sands of the ridge are located in Highlands County and Polk County, and also extend north into Osceola, Orange, and Lake Counties.

It is named for the city of Lake Wales, roughly at the midpoint of the ridge. The highest point of the ridge is Sugarloaf Mountain, which at 312 feet (95 meters) is also the highest natural point in peninsular Florida. Iron Mountain, the location of Bok Tower, marks another well known high point on the ridge, attaining an elevation of 295 ft (90 m). A northern unconnected extension of the Lake Wales Ridge exists in western Putnam County near the town of Grandin.

The area's landscape includes scrub, flatwoods, wetlands, and lakes. The scrub habitat along the ridge is one of the oldest scrub habitats in Florida. The area was developed with citrus groves, been timbered for its longleaf pines trees, and remaining pine trees were tapped for turpentine.

== Origins ==
Florida's ancient sand islands stretch for over 100 miles (160 km) down the middle of central Florida. Glacial changes and the rising and falling of the oceans caused dramatic transformations on the Florida peninsula. Covered almost completely by water two million years ago, only a series of small islands existed. It is the remnants of those islands that make up today's Lake Wales Ridge. Although the waters have receded, the islands continue to support distinctive life forms found nowhere else. Today several communities are located inside the Lake Wales sand ridge, with the white sands visible in many neighborhoods.

== Geomorphology ==
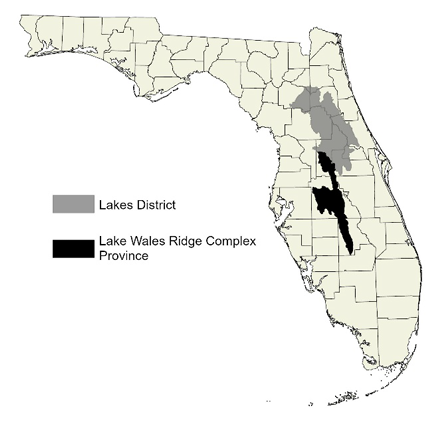
Location Lake Wales Ridge Complex geomorphological province in Florida

The Florida Geological Survey has designated the Lake Wales Ridge Complex Province, a geomorphological province consisting of the Lake Worth Ridge, and the Lake Henry, Lakeland, Gordonville, and Winter Haven ridges.

== Habitat ==
These relic sand dunes created over thousands of years by the dynamic movements of sea, ice and wind now provide refuge for rare and endangered plants and animals. Although consisting of a variety of habitats from low and wet bayheads to high and dry sandhills, the ridge is most famous for its scrub habitat. Wildlife and plants once isolated on these islands evolved extremely unusual characteristics. This forest in miniature consists of clusters of shrubs scattered between patches of open sand. The lack of canopy cover and very deep porous sands create a hot, dry, desert like habitat. Due primarily to a long period of isolation, plants and animals that live on the Ridge have developed ways to deal with their harsh environment.

== Endemic flora and fauna ==
About 40 plant species, at least 40 arthropod species, and several vertebrate species are endemic to Florida scrub, see this listing. One of the region's best known residents is the Florida scrub-jay.

When walking through scrub areas, small scrub lizards often race off in the distance — crossing the hot sand quickly. Many animals of the scrub spend much of their lives underground, likely to escape the hot sun as well as to avoid predators. The gopher tortoise digs a burrow underground that may be up to ten feet deep and up to 30 feet long. More than 360 species may share the gopher's burrow. Other small animals such as the sand skink leave only S-shaped tracks as it "swims" just beneath the surface of the sand. It is the only known sand-swimming skink in North America and occurs in only seven counties in Florida.

Most of the vegetation in the Lake Wales Sand Ridge consists of scrub plants with thick waxy coated leaves that are drought tolerant. The leaves of the sand live oak are thick and leathery, rolled in at the edges to help retain as much water as possible during the heat of summer. Species of Opuntia, Yucca, Scrub plum, and scrub Serenoa repens palm also are well adapted to the hot sun and fast draining soils.

In the early twentieth century, parts of the ridge were converted to citrus groves. More recently, some of those have been redeveloped for residential housing, particularly in the north of the ridge. Today several areas of the Ridge are protected National Wildlife Refuges and State Forest.

=== Lake Wales Ridge National Wildlife Refuge ===
The refuge preserves natural habitat in four separated areas of the ridge. The refuge is not open to the public.

=== Lake Wales Ridge State Forest ===
The state forest is located east of Frostproof, and provides hiking trails and other recreational facilities.

== See also ==
- Brooksville Ridge
- Iron Mountain (Florida)
- Archbold Biological Station
