= Brooksville Ridge =

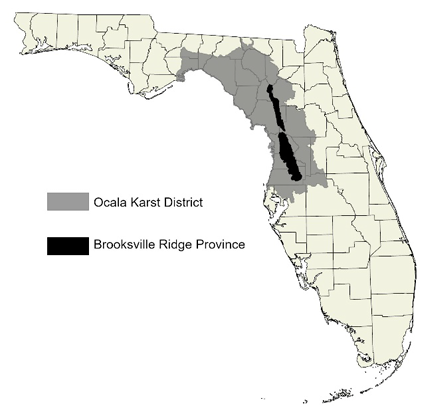
Location of Brooksville Ridge in Florida

The Brooksville Ridge is a geomorphological province in Florida. The formation includes limestone deposits and caves. It is believed to have been formed from sandhills deposited during interglacial periods.

The Brooksville Ridge lies in a north-northwest to south-southeast line, extending from the edge of the Santa Fe River floodplain in eastern Gilchrist County through southwestern Alachua County, east-central Levy County, southwestern Marion County, and central Citrus and Hernando counties, to eastern Pasco County. The province is bordered on the west by several coastal karst plain provinces; the Wacassassa Flats, Gulf Hammock, Crystal River Karst Plain, and Land O'Lakes Karst Plain provinces. It is bordered on the east by several inland karst plain provinces; the Williston Karst Plain, Tsala Apopka Plain, and Green Swamp provinces. The Brooksville Ridge province is divided into northern and southern segments by the Dunellon Gap, through which the Withlacoochee River flows, forming the boundary between Marion and Citrus counties.

The area has been mined for phosphate.

== See also ==
- Atlantic Coastal Ridge
- Lake Wales Ridge
- Trail Ridge
