= Britton Hill =

Highest ground in Florida

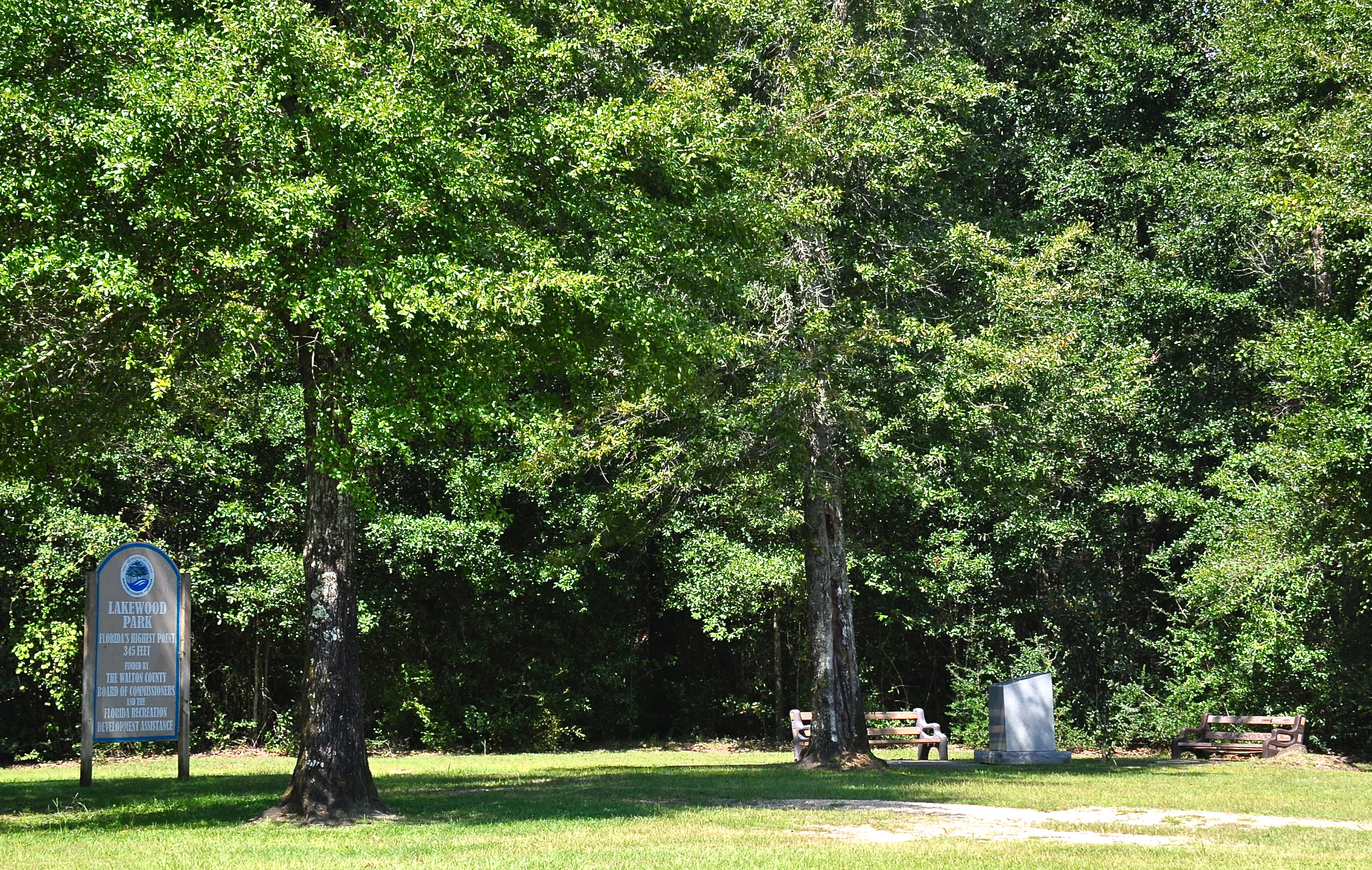
- The summit of Britton Hill, the State of Florida's highest point at 345 feet (105 m).

Highest point
- Elevation: 345 ft (105 m)
- Prominence: 65 ft (20 m)
- Listing: U.S. state high point 50th
- Coordinates: 30°59′19″N 86°16′55″W

Geography
- Location within Florida Location within the United States
- Location: Walton County, Florida, United States
- Parent range: Florida Ridge Hills
- Topo map: USGS Paxton

Geology
- Rock age: Tertiary
- Mountain type: Sedimentary

Climbing
- Easiest route: paved road

Britton Hill is the highest natural point in the state of Florida, United States, with a summit elevation of 345 ft (105 m) above mean sea level. Britton Hill is the lowest state highpoint in the United States, 103 ft (31 m) lower than the second-lowest U.S. state highpoint, Ebright Azimuth in Delaware.

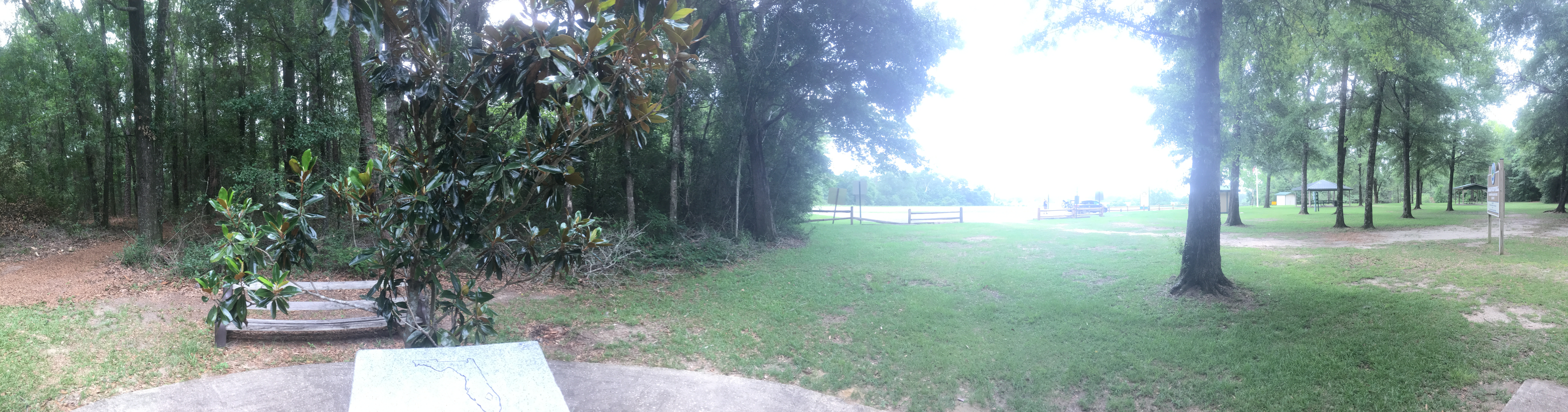
Panoramic view of Britton Hill and Lakewood Park

The hill is located in northern Walton County near the town of Lakewood, Florida, just off County Road 285 about 2 mi (3 km) southeast of Florala, Alabama. It is inside Lakewood Park, which marks the high point and features a monument, trails, and an information board.

The hill is named after and in honor of the Britton family and former early 1900s lumber mill baron William Henry Britton. The family gifted the land after Hazel Slaughter Britton's death in 1976.

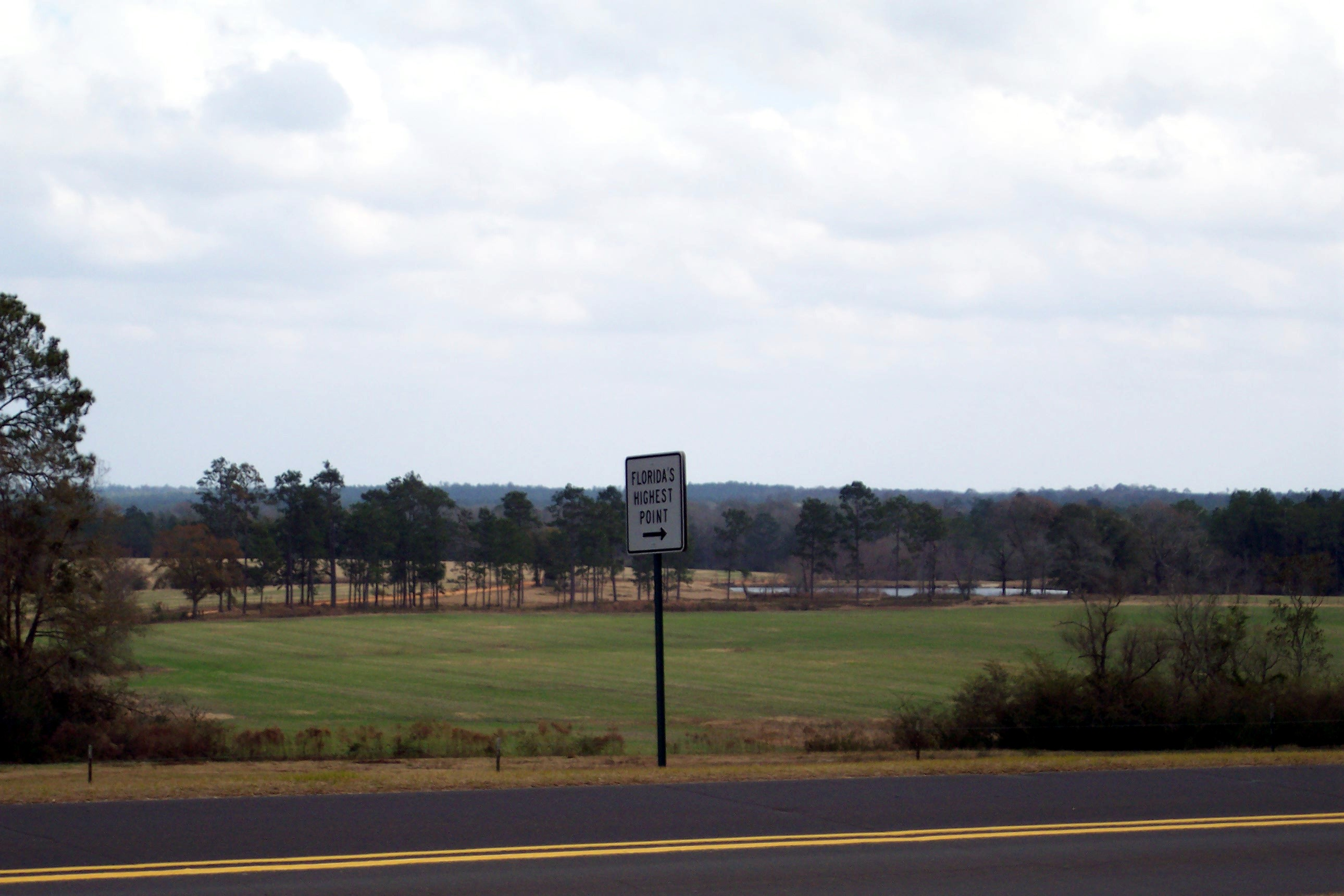
A view of the surrounding countryside

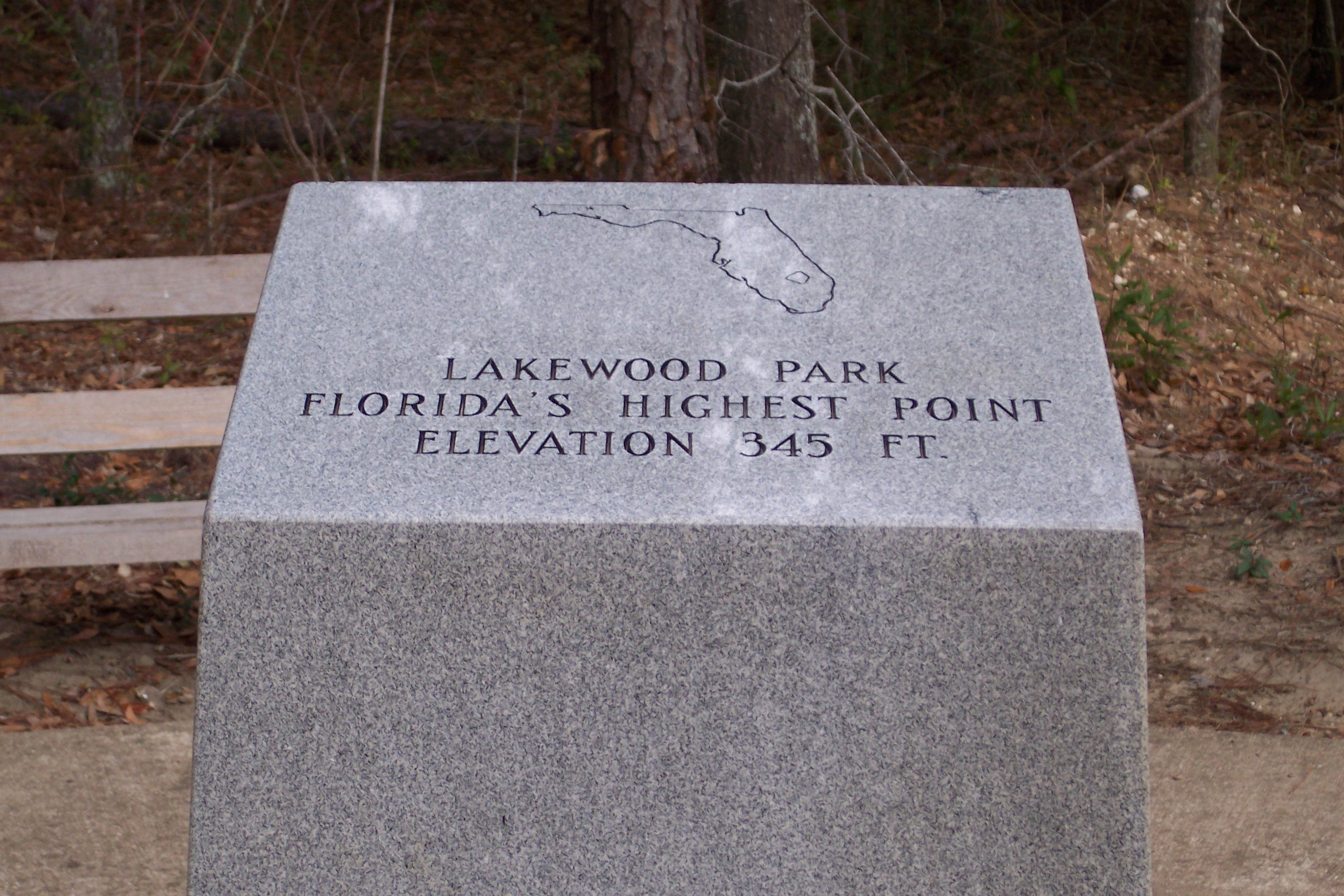
A marker sits atop the hill

== See also ==
- List of Florida's highest points
- List of U.S. states by elevation
- Highpointing
