= Trail Ridge =

Sand ridge in Florida and Georgia (United States)

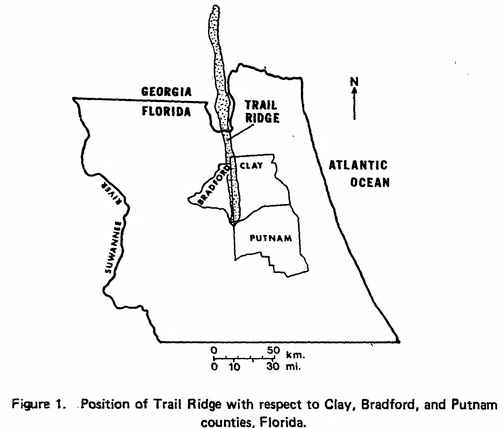
Sketch map of lower end of the Trail Ridge in Florida showing its relation to Bradford, Clay, and Putnam counties

The Trail Ridge is a sand ridge in southeastern Georgia and northeastern Florida. Portions of the sand on the ridge contain deposits of heavy metals, which have been mined near the southern end of the ridge. The ridge was initially described as a relic beach ridge, thought to have originated in the Pliocene or early to middle Pleistocene epoch as a barrier island with a fresh water lagoon to its west, of which the Okefenokee Swamp may be a relic of the northern end. Later investigation of the internal structure of the southernmost part of the ridge suggests that the ridge is the result of an inland migration of a line of coastal dunes. Part of the southern end overlays a layer of peat that may represent a freshwater swamp that was buried when the dune line migrated inland.

== Name ==
Trail Ridge is named for the Alachua Trail, which ran along its crest in Florida. The Alachua Trail was an Indian trail that led from the Altamaha River in Georgia to the "Alachua Country", the area around what is now called Paynes Prairie in Alachua County, Florida, that was used by white Americans in the colonial and Florida Territorial periods. In Florida, the trail followed the crest of the ridge from east of Maccleney to Kingsley Lake, providing a dry path between flanking wetlands.

== Description ==
Trail Ridge has been described as a relic beach ridge on the Atlantic Plain, extending in a very gentle curve about 65 kilometres (40 mi) west of the Atlantic coast from the Altamaha River in southeastern Georgia to Bradford and Clay counties in northeastern Florida. It is 209 kilometres (130 mi) long, and 1 to 2 kilometres (0.62 to 1.24 mi) wide. The ridge is conspicuous, rising tens of meters above the adjacent land. The crest of the ridge is 46 to 52 metres (151 to 171 ft) above sea level in Georgia, and 51 to 76 metres (167 to 249 ft) above sea level in Florida. The ridge forms the eastern border of the Okefenokee Swamp, preventing any drainage of the swamp to the east. In Bradford and Clay counties, the top 10 to 20 metres (33 to 66 ft) of the ridge is sand, partly underlain by layers of lignitic peat intermixed with layers of sand.

== Geology ==
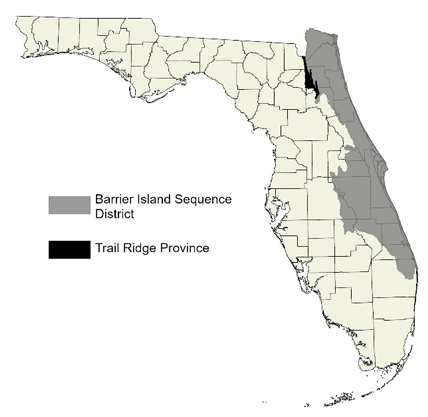
Location map of Trail Ridge geomorphological province in Florida

Trail Ridge is believed to have originated as a barrier island system separating the Atlantic Ocean from a coastal lagoon. The Okefenokee Swamp is believed to be a remnant of the northern end of that lagoon. It is possible that the barrier system grew northward as a spit from an island at the southern end of the Northern Highlands of Florida, but growth southward from the mainland coast in what is now Georgia would be more consistent with the southward littoral drift along the Atlantic coast of Georgia and Florida. Trail Ridge rises and broadens towards its southern end, transforming into a karst landscape with many lakes in solution holes. The eastern slope has the profile of an offshore seaward slope. That slope is offset twice towards the southern end of the ridge. A relic spit extends northward from each offset. The more northerly relic spit is separated from Trail Ridge by Black Creek, which originates from Kingsley Lake and other lakes in the karst landscape at the southern end and flows to the St. Johns River. The southerly relic spit is separated from the karstic highland at the southern end by Ates Creek, a tributary of Black Creek.

Core samples from bore holes in Georgia have produced fossil shells of molluscs. The fossils are all from extant shallow marine species. The absence of fossils of extinct species argues for an age no earlier than the late Pleistocene for the ridge. Descriptions of the internal structure of the ridge have been reported for the ore-bearing sands at the southern end. The part in Florida is designated by the Florida Geological Survey as a geomorphological province in the Barrier Island Sequence District.

=== Sand layer ===
The upper part of the ridge consists of quartz sand. Where the sand has been mined and/or cores obtained from drill holes, the sand is up to 20 metres (66 ft) thick. The sand grains are well rounded, well sorted, and low in post-depositional clay, all of which indicates an aeolian origin for the ridge, with the ridge having migrated in a southwestern direction. The top 2 to 3 metres (6 ft 7 in to 9 ft 10 in) of the sand is bleached, with a lower concentration of heavy metals than is found in the deeper sand. One or more indurated layers of humate-cemented sand may occur below the bleached zone down to a hardpan that is up to 6.5 metres (21 ft) below the surface, representing past and present water table levels. Weakly cemented ore sand below the hardpan exhibits a high-angle (26° to 41°) cross-bedding. The cross-beds are separated by dark laminae up to 1 centimetre (0.39 in) thick. The dark sand in the laminae is enriched in heavy metal, up to 12.3% compared to 1% or less in adjacent light sand. The sorting of heavy metal grains is believed to have occurred on the windward (northeastern) face of the ridge (where wind energy was higher), with the heavy metals being deposited on the leeward (southwestern) side in pulses.

=== Peat layer ===
The central to western part of the southern end (the Trail Ridge Ore Body) overlies a 1.5 metres (4 ft 11 in) thick layer of lignitic peat that includes large pieces of wood and pinecones. The interface between the overlying ore sand and the peat has a dip of 3 metres per kilometre (16 ft/mi) to the west-southwest. The peat layer is in turn underlain by clastic rock which includes marine clay. At other locations under the ridge at about the depth where peat and lignite has been found, there is a layer of weathered clay which appears to be of the same age as the peat and lignite. Both the peat/lignite and the clay lie on sandy sediments.

Pinecones, branches and upright stumps are recognizable in the peat where it has been uncovered by mining operations. Two core samples of the peat layer were obtained at 15 to 19 metres (49 to 62 ft) beneath the land surface from bore holes through the Ore Body. The peat layer has some characteristics of peat and others of lignite, and is composed of recognizable clumps of wood in a matrix of amorphous organic detritus with pockets of peaty sand. Horizons of charcoal and fungal remains are also present in the peat. Analysis of pollen and spores found in the core samples revealed the predominant presence of shrubs and small trees such as hollies (Ilex), wax myrtle and bayberry (Myrica), titi (Cyrilla racemiflora), hazel Corylus, and loblolly-bay (Gordonia lasianthus), and herbaceous plants such as sedges (Cyperaceae), ferns (Osmunda), and moss (Sphagnum). All of those plants require fresh water and some will grow in standing water. The lower part of one of the core samples contained abundant pollen of Cypress (Taxodium) and other plants commonly found in a cypress swamp community. Cyrilla, Gordonia, and Magnolia, which are sub-tropical, were abundant, while oaks and pines, which are usually found in wetlands in the southeastern U.S., were scarce. The relative abundance of different pollens in the peat suggests that the peat originated in the Pliocene epoch. Two attempts to radiocarbon date the upper level of the peat did not detect any residual radioactive carbon decay, indicating that the peat is more than 45,000 years old.

A core sample in Clay County produced a 28.5-centimetre (11.2 in) thick layer of brown coal (lignite) from under 10.1 metres (33 ft) of sand. The core contained compressed plant leaves and other structures. The lower 5 centimetres (2.0 in) had very thin (1 millimetre [0.039 in]) layers of sand. Layers of charcoal and sand were present at about 17 centimetres (6.7 in) below the top of the lignite. The composition of the vegetation represented in the lignite changed over time. The top 8 centimetres (3.1 in) consisted of a Gordonia grass pollen assemblage, the middle 13 centimetres (5.1 in) consisted of a Gordonia and shrub pollen assemblage, while the bottom 7 centimetres (2.8 in) consisted of a Cyrilla (titi) - Sphagnum (moss) - grass - sedge pollen or spore assemblage. Wax Myrtle pollen was abundant throughout the lignite. The relative abundance of different types pollen in the core is interpreted to mean that the swamp started as a Cyrilla shrub swamp with a closed canopy and abundant grasses and/or sedges. This eventually transitioned to a shrub swamp, and later to a tree/shrub swamp with an open canopy and abundant grasses and sedges. The initial assemblage of titi, wax myrtle, grasses, sedges, and sphagnum moss is still common in swamps on the coastal plain in Florida and Georgia. Periodic fires suppressed some species relative to others, shaping the composition of the swamp. Titi, wax myrtle, and holly shrubs eventually closed in the canopy, reducing herbaceous plants in the middle period. Cyrilla also declined as the swamp transitioned to a shrub swamp. Another transition came at 8 centimetres (3.1 in) from the top of the lignite. Loblolly-bay and various heathers appeared in the swamp followed by cypress and black gum late in the period. The cypress and black gum never dominated, however, and the swamp appears to have retained a partially open canopy up to the end. Based on consideration of how much compaction peat would have to undergo to produce lignite, and of measurements of the accumulation rate of peat in the Okefenokee Swamp, Rich calculated that the swamp that produced the lignite sampled in the core existed for about 1,400 years before being buried by the migrating dune line that became Trail Ridge.

== History ==
The structure of the southern end of the Trail Ridge indicates that it was built entirely by aeolian processes. There is no evidence of a marine origin or influence. What little sand is found in the peat layer was evidently aeolian in origin, i.e., deposited by wind. Trail Ridge is presumed to have originated as a coastal barrier system, but prevailing northeastern winds pushed the dunes away from the shore. Aeolian dunes block surface drainage, and freshwater swamps or lagoons may form landward of dune systems, similar to how drainage of the Okefenokee Swamp to the east is blocked by the Trail Ridge. After de-coupling from the coast, the barrier system migrated away from the coast as a series of parabolic dunes which stayed parallel to the coast. At the southern end of the system, the dunes eventually migrated over the swamp to the west, burying it and creating the peat layer.

== Mining ==
The Trail Ridge Ore Body at the southern end contains lenses of sand enriched with heavy metals, with an average content of 6% of metals including the titanium containing ores ilmenite and rutile, and zircon. The DuPont chemical company has mined the sand of the Ore Body for titanium and other heavy metals since 1949. Titanium compounds limenite, leucoxene, and rutile make up 45% of the heavy metals in the sand. Other metal compounds in the sand include staurolite, zircon, kyanite, sillimanite, tourmaline, spinel, topaz, and carborundum. Smaller quantities of monazite, which contains thorium and rare earths, are also recovered from the mined sand.

In 1996, DuPont announced plans to open a titanium mine on Trail Ridge adjacent to the Okefenokee Swamp. After opposition to the mining developed, a "No Mine Agreement" was reached in 1999. DuPont transferred the mineral rights for 20,000 acres (8,100 ha) to the Okefenokee National Wildlife Refuge and the Conservation Fund in 2003. In 2019, Twin Pine Minerals proposed to mine titanium from a 2,400-acre (970 ha) site (later reduced to 582 acres [236 ha]) on the Trail Ridge next to the Okefenokee Swamp. That proposal was also heavily opposed, and the mining company sold their land to the Conservation Fund in 2025 for $60 million.

== Ecology ==
The striped newt (Notophthalmus perstriatus) lives in the area. The area includes sandhills with fire-prone longleaf pine habitats. Restoration efforts have been launched. The Florida scrub palmetto (Sabal etonia), which is endemic to scrub communities on ridges in central and eastern Florida, is found in Clay County. One of three known locations in Florida for the endemic Chapman's rhododendron (Rhododendron minus var. chapmanii is also on the ridge in Clay County.
