= Collegiate High School =

Collegiate High School may refer to:

- Collegiate High School (Lakeland, Florida), a school on the Polk State College in Florida, USA
- Collegiate High School at Northwest Florida State College, a school in Niceville, Florida, USA
- Collegiate School of Medicine and Bioscience, a school in St. Louis, Missouri, USA
- Collegiate High School (Blackpool), was a secondary high school specialising on sports and maths in Blackpool, Lancashire, UK.
