= Collegiate =

Collegiate may refer to:

- College
- Webster's Dictionary, a dictionary with editions referred to as a "Collegiate"
- Collegiate (1926 film), 1926 American silent film directed by Del Andrews
- Collegiate (1936 film), 1936 American musical film directed by Ralph Murphy
- "Collegiate" (song), song by Moe Jaffe and Nat Bonx

== See also ==
- Collegiate athletics, athletic competition organized by colleges and universities
- Collegiate church, a church where the daily office of worship is maintained by a college of canons
- Collegiate School (disambiguation)
- Collegiate institute, a Canadian school of secondary or higher education
- Collegiate university
- St Michael's Collegiate School, Hobart, Australia
- Collegiate Gothic, an architectural style subgenre of Gothic Revival architecture
