= Biltmore–Cumberland Historic District =

Historic district in Florida, United States

- U.S. National Register of Historic Places
- U.S. Historic district
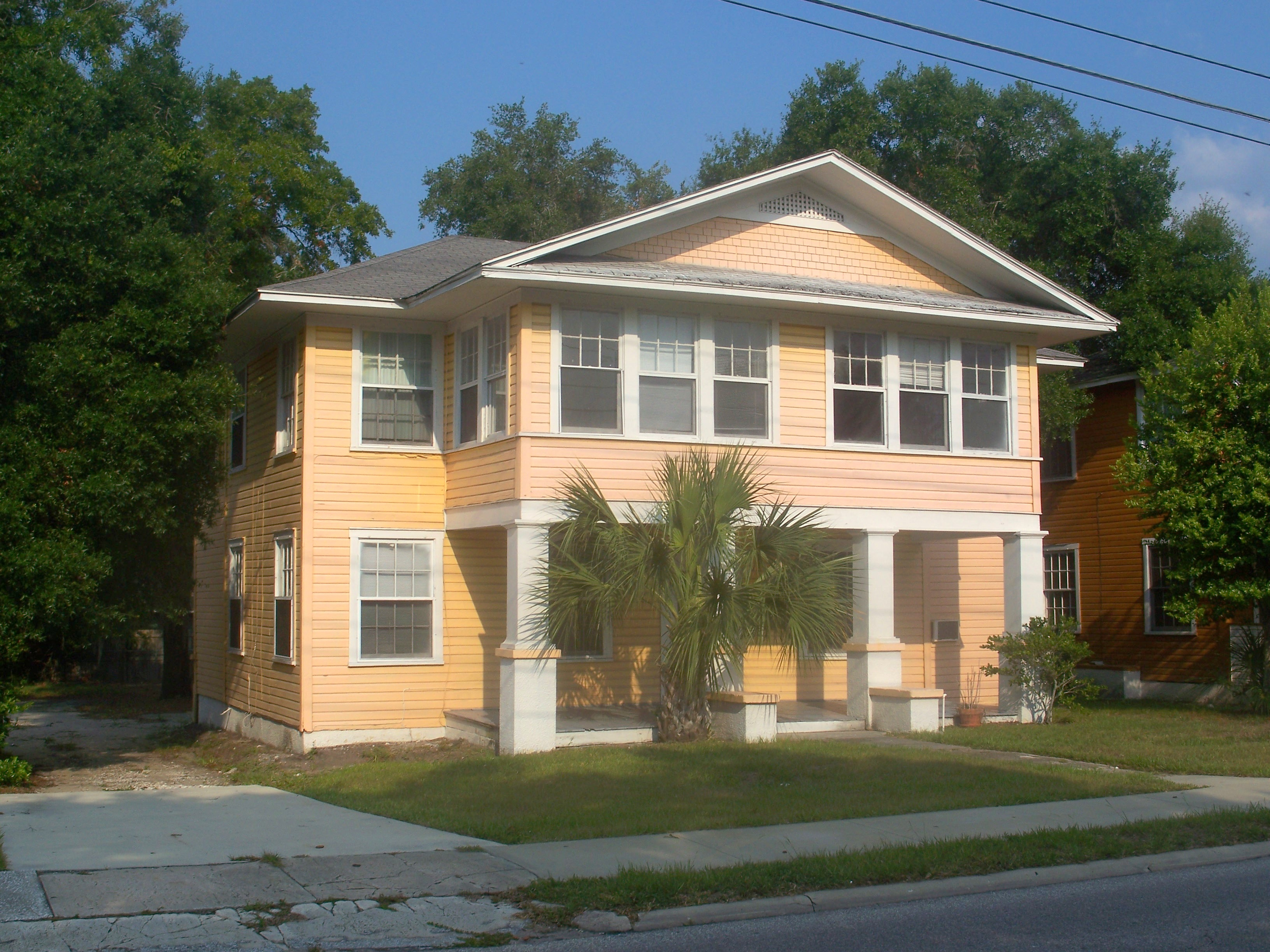

- Location within Florida Location within the United States
- Location: Lakeland, Florida
- Coordinates: 28°2′27″N 81°56′33″W
- Area: 650 acres (2.6 km^{2})
- Architectural style: Bungalow/Craftsman, Colonial Revival
- NRHP reference No.: 04000565
- Added to NRHP: June 4, 2004

The Biltmore–Cumberland Historic District is a U.S. historic district (designated as such on June 4, 2004) located in Lakeland, Florida. The district is bounded by South Ingraham Avenue, East Lime Street, Bartow Road, Hollingsworth Road, and McDonald Place. It contains 201 historic buildings.
