= East Lake Morton Residential District =

Historic district in Florida, United States

- U.S. National Register of Historic Places
- U.S. Historic district
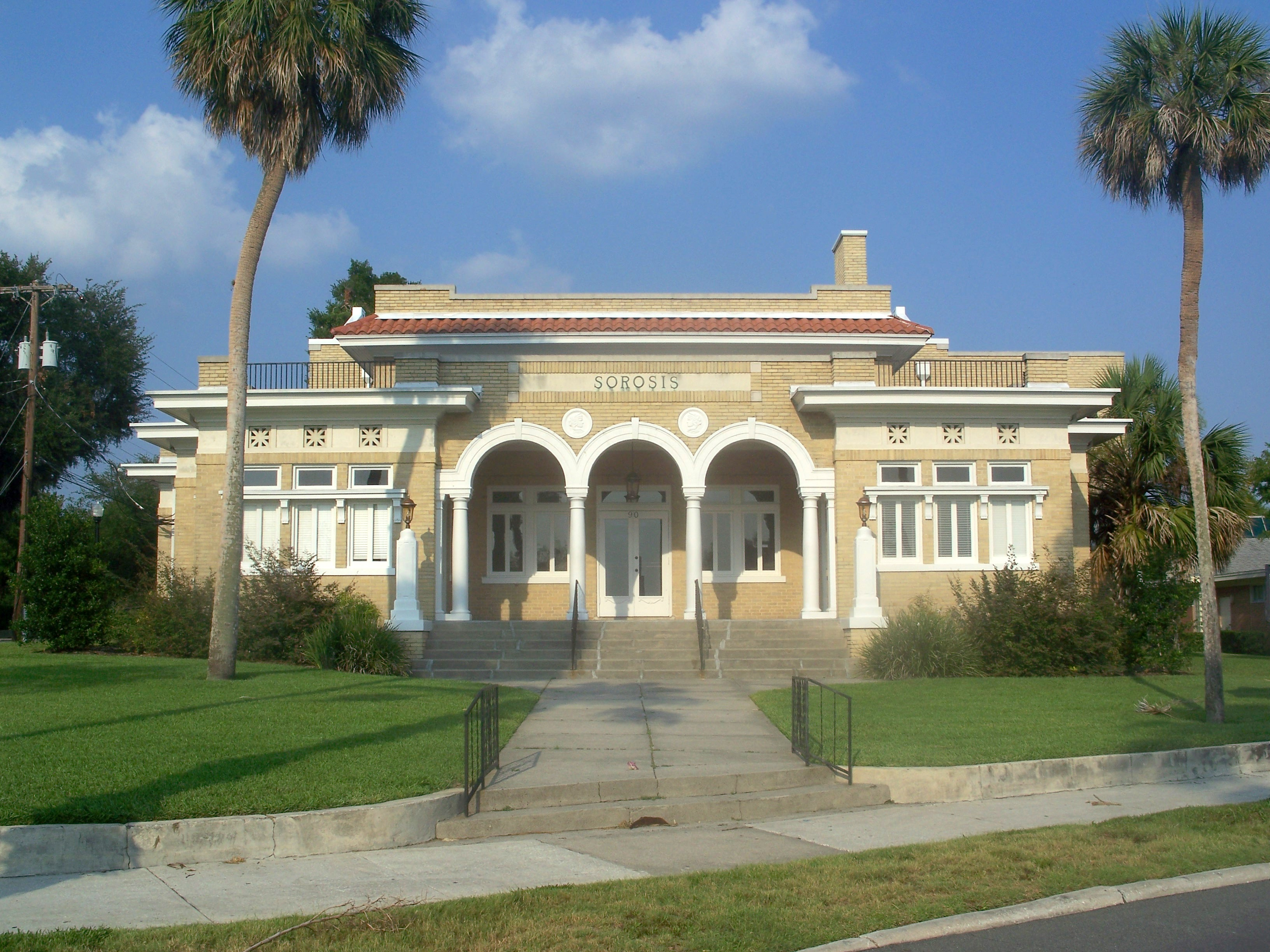

- Location within Florida Location within the United States
- Location: Lakeland, Florida
- Coordinates: 28°2′21″N 81°56′59″W
- Area: 900 acres (3.6 km^{2})
- NRHP reference No.: 93000621
- Added to NRHP: July 9, 1993

The East Lake Morton Residential District is a U.S. historic district (designated as such on July 9, 1993) located in Lakeland, Florida. The district is bounded by Orange Street, Ingraham Avenue, Palmetto Street, Lake Morton Drive and Massachusetts Avenue. It contains 215 historic buildings.
