= Lakeside Village (Florida) =

Open-air shopping mall in Lakeland, Florida

Coordinates: 28°0′1″N 81°58′47″W

- Location: Lakeland, Florida, United States
- Opened: October 2005
- Developer: CASTO
- Num. of stores: 72
- Num. of anchor tenants: 4
- Floor area: 558,458 sq ft (51,882.4 m^{2})
- Floors: 1 and 2-story buildings
- Parking: 4,000 spaces
- Website: shoplakesidevillage.net

Lakeside Village is an open-air shopping mall located on the southern side of Lakeland, Florida, in the United States. Located off the Polk Parkway at Harden Boulevard, it is classified as a "regional mall" by the International Council of Shopping Centers, and it draws shoppers from much of the Lakeland metropolitan area.

It is also a mixed-use complex, with office space available and three hotels on site.

Since opening, the shopping center has caused businesses off of Florida Avenue to either close or relocate due to competition.

== Anchor Stores ==
- Belk
- Cobb Lakeside 18 & IMAX (18-screen movie theater)
- Kohl's
- Nordstrom Rack
