= Loyce E. Harpe Park =

Park in Florida, United States

Coordinates: 27°55′42″N 81°57′42″W

- Interactive map of Loyce E. Harpe Park
- Type: County park
- Location: 500 W. Carter Road, Lakeland, Florida
- Nearest city: Lakeland, Florida
- Established: Dedicated in 2006

Loyce E. Harpe Park, formerly known as Carter Road Park, is located in Polk County, Florida . The park includes four softball fields, nine South Lakeland Babe Ruth League baseball fields, and six soccer fields. In addition, there is a mountain bicycle trail, hiking trail, disc golf course and fishing. A dog park, DiOGi Park, opened on July 14, 2007. The park is host to various special events produced by Polk County Leisure Services throughout the year, with the Haunted Halloween Hayride and Happenings (end of October) as the largest event featured.

The park is named after Loyce E. Harpe, who was the county's first parks and recreation director. Mr. Harpe served as a parks and recreation professional during most of his 31 years in public service.

The park was officially dedicated and renamed on June 24, 2006, after Mr. Harpe. Loyce Harpe was born on February 13, 1944, and died on April 5, 2005.
