= South Lake Morton Historic District =

Historic district in Florida, United States

- U.S. National Register of Historic Places
- U.S. Historic district
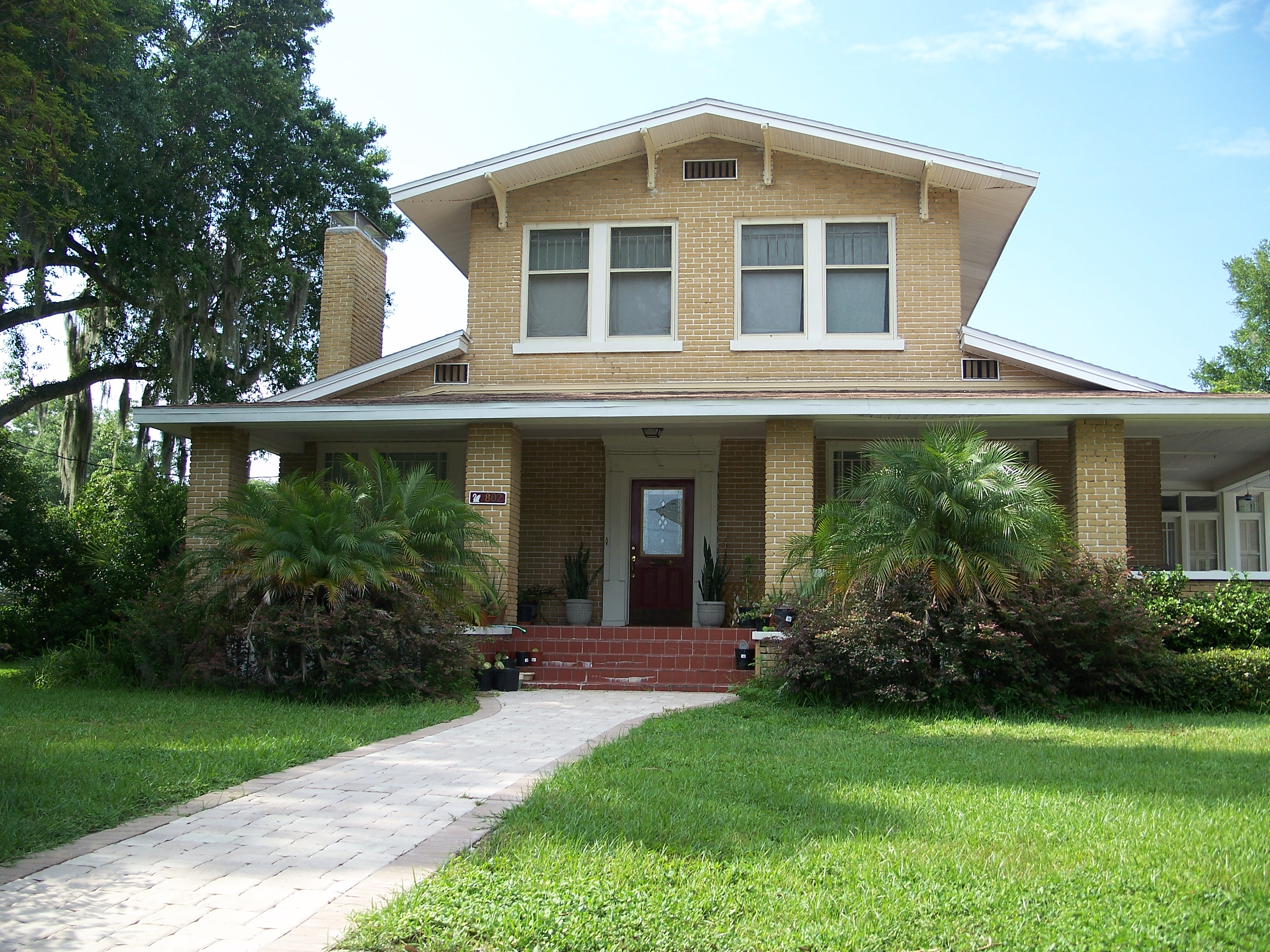
- House in the district

- Location within Florida Location within the United States
- Location: Lakeland, Florida
- Coordinates: 28°1′56″N 81°57′7″W
- Area: 2,500 acres (10 km^{2})
- Built: 1900-1942
- NRHP reference No.: 85002900
- Added to NRHP: November 20, 1985

The South Lake Morton Historic District is a U.S. historic district (designated as such on November 20, 1985) located in Lakeland, Florida. It received its designation because it provides an outstanding example of urban planning from the early 20th century, and because of the large number of architecturally significant structures ranging from 1920- 1948. It contains 557 historic buildings. Most of the homes are bungalows from the Arts and Crafts period of the 1920s and 30s. There are also examples of Victorian, Queen Anne, and Spanish Revival homes. The district is bounded by Lake Morton Drive and Palmetto Street, Ingraham Avenue, Johnson Avenue, Frank Lloyd Wright Way (formerly McDonald Street,) Belmar Street, and Tennessee Avenue.
