= Lakeland, Florida =

- City
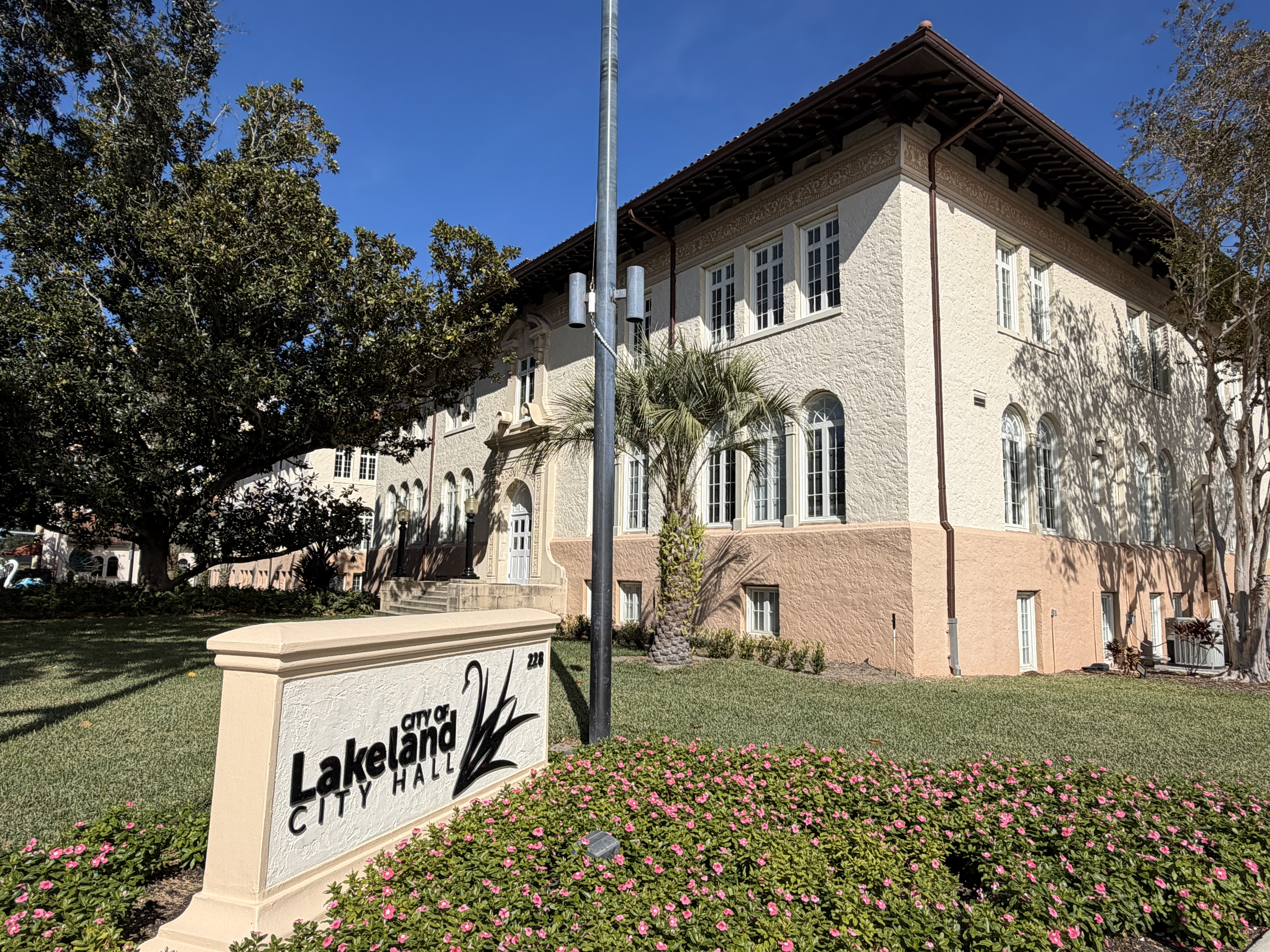
- Lakeland City Hall

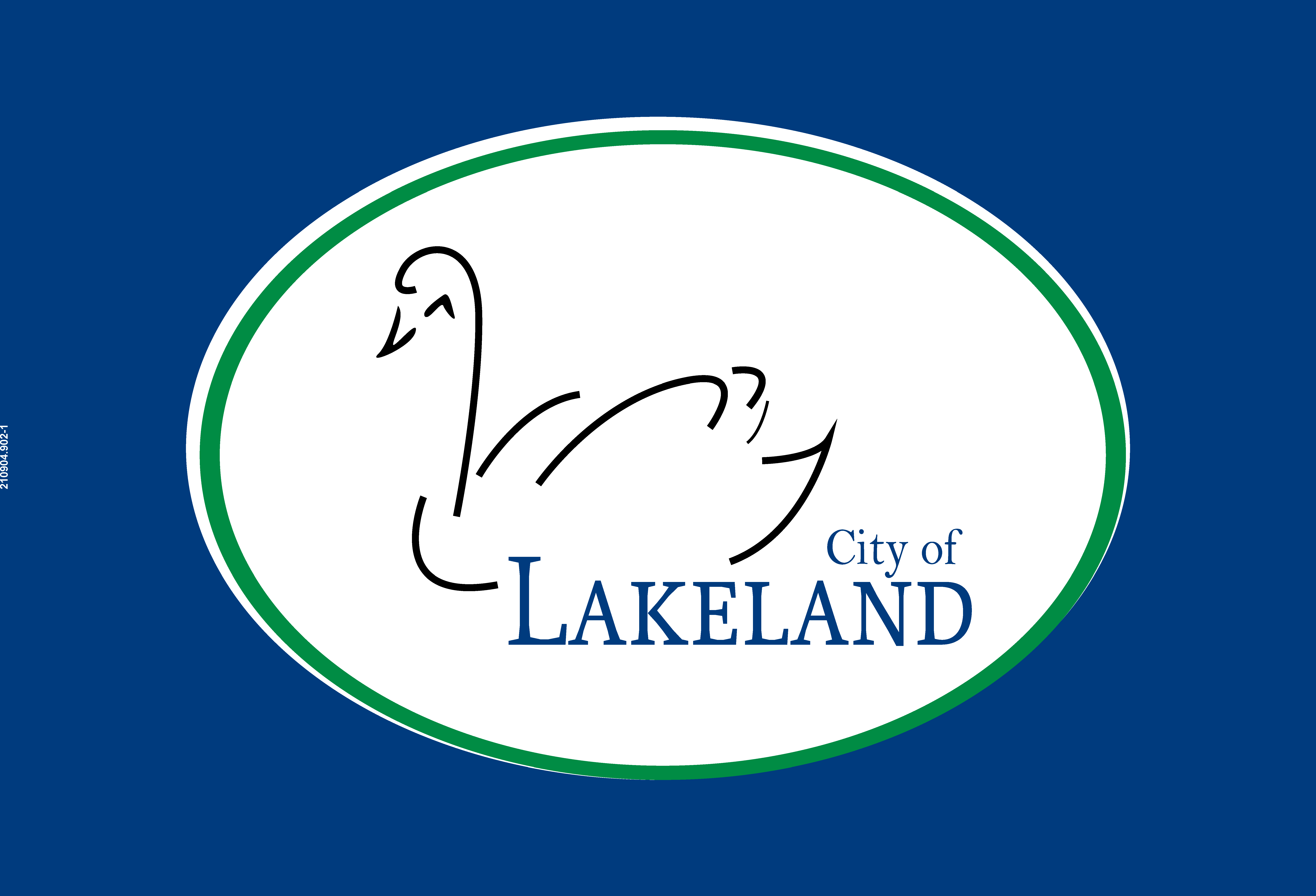
- Flag
- Nickname: Swan City
- Location in Polk County and the state of Florida
- Coordinates: 28°03′20″N 81°57′16″W
- Country: United States
- State: Florida
- County: Polk
- Settled: c. 1870s
- Incorporated: January 1, 1885

Government
  - Type: Commission-Manager

Area
  - City: 75.30 sq mi (195.02 km^{2})
  - Land: 66.29 sq mi (171.69 km^{2})
  - Water: 9.01 sq mi (23.34 km^{2}) 10.9%
- Elevation: 203 ft (62 m)

Population (2020)
  - City: 112,641
  - Estimate (2025): 125,520
  - Density: 1,699.3/sq mi (656.09/km^{2})
  - Urban: 277,915 (US: 147th)
  - Urban density: 1,904/sq mi (735.3/km^{2})
  - Metro: 725,046 (US: 80th)
- Demonym: Lakelander
- Time zone: UTC−5 (EST)
  - Summer (DST): UTC−4 (EDT)
- ZIP Codes: 33801–33815
- Area code: 863
- FIPS code: 12-38250
- GNIS feature ID: 2404873
- Website: www.lakelandgov.net

Lakeland is a city in Polk County, Florida, United States. Located along I-4 east of Tampa and southwest of Orlando, it is the most populous city in Polk County. As of the 2020 U.S. Census, the city had a population of 112,641. Lakeland is a principal city of the Lakeland–Winter Haven Metropolitan Statistical Area and is often included as part of the Tampa Bay area.

Lakeland is situated among several lakes including Lake Morton downtown and is sometimes locally referred to by the nickname "Swan City" due to its sizeable population of swans, all of whom are descendants of two mute swans given to Lakeland by Queen Elizabeth II in 1957. Lakeland is home to several colleges and universities. Lakeland Linder International Airport is in Lakeland as is the corporate headquarters of Publix, a supermarket chain.

European-American settlers arrived in Lakeland from Missouri, Kentucky, Tennessee, Georgia and South Carolina in the 1870s. The city expanded in the 1880s with the arrival of rail service, with the first freedmen railway workers settling here in 1883. They and European immigrants also came because of land development opportunities with farming, citrus, cattle and phosphate industry developing. Lakeland is home to the 1,267-acre Circle B Bar Reserve (513 ha).

== History ==
=== Early history ===
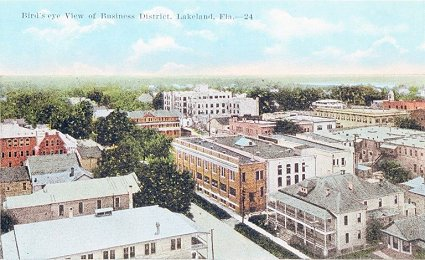
Lakeland's business district, early 1920s

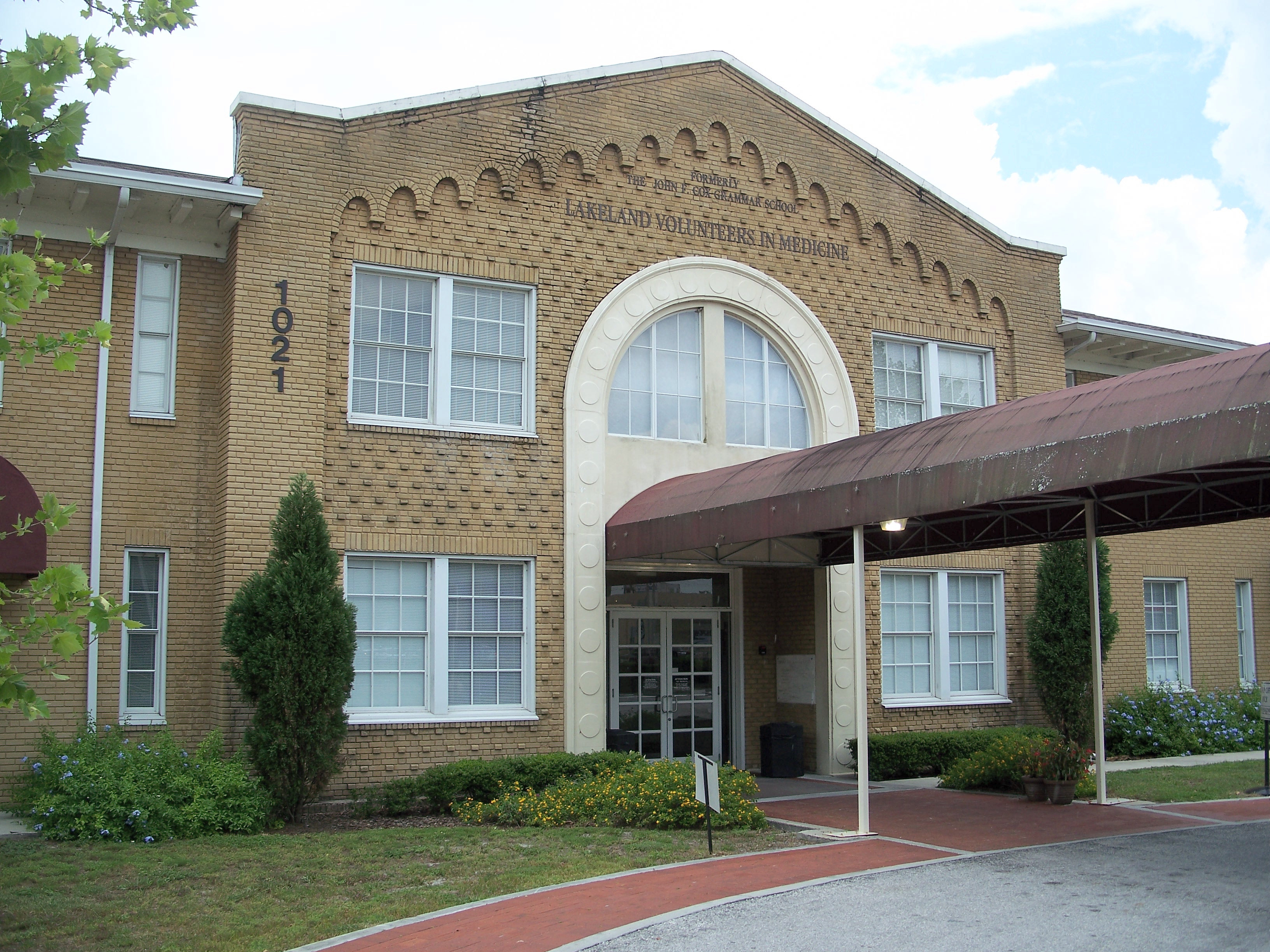
The John F. Cox Grammar School opened in 1925, which now serves as the building for Academy Prep Center of Lakeland, a private middle school which serves grades 5–8.

In the 18th century Native Americans groups, collectively called "Seminoles", moved into the areas left vacant. In 1823, the United States and the various tribes in Florida signed the Treaty of Moultrie Creek, which created a reservation in central Florida that included what is now Polk County. Starting in 1832, the United States government tried to move the Seminoles in Florida west to the Indian Territory. Most of the Seminoles resisted, resulting in the Second Seminole War, which lasted from 1835 to 1842. By the end of that war, most of the Seminoles had been sent west, with a few remnants pushed well south of what is now Polk County.

=== Statehood and the 19th century ===
Florida became a state in 1845, and Polk County was established in 1861. After the American Civil War, the county seat was established southeast of Lakeland in Bartow. While most of Polk County's early history centered on the two cities of Bartow and Fort Meade, eventually, people entered the areas in northern Polk County and began settling in the areas which became Lakeland.

Lakeland was first settled in the 1870s, and began to develop as the rail lines reached the area in 1884. Freedmen settled here in 1883, starting development of what became the African-American neighborhood of Moorehead. Lakeland was incorporated January 1, 1885. The town was founded by Abraham Munn (a resident of Louisville, Kentucky), who purchased 80 acres (320,000 m^{2}) of land in what is now downtown Lakeland in 1882 and platted the land for the town in 1884. Lakeland was named for the many lakes near the town site.

In April 1898, the Spanish–American War began and started a crucial point in Lakeland's development. While the war ended quickly and had little effect on most of the nation, the Florida peninsula was used as a launching point for military forces in the war. The then small town of Lakeland housed over 9,000 troops. The 10th Cavalry Regiment, one of the original Buffalo Soldier regiments, were housed on the banks of Lake Wire. Soon after being stationed there, the black troops faced conflict with the local white population. In one event, a local druggist refused to sell to black soldiers and an argument ensued which eventually escalated to the point where the druggist brandished a pistol. The soldiers shot the druggist before he could fire, which resulted in two of the troops being arrested.

=== The Florida Boom and the 20th century ===
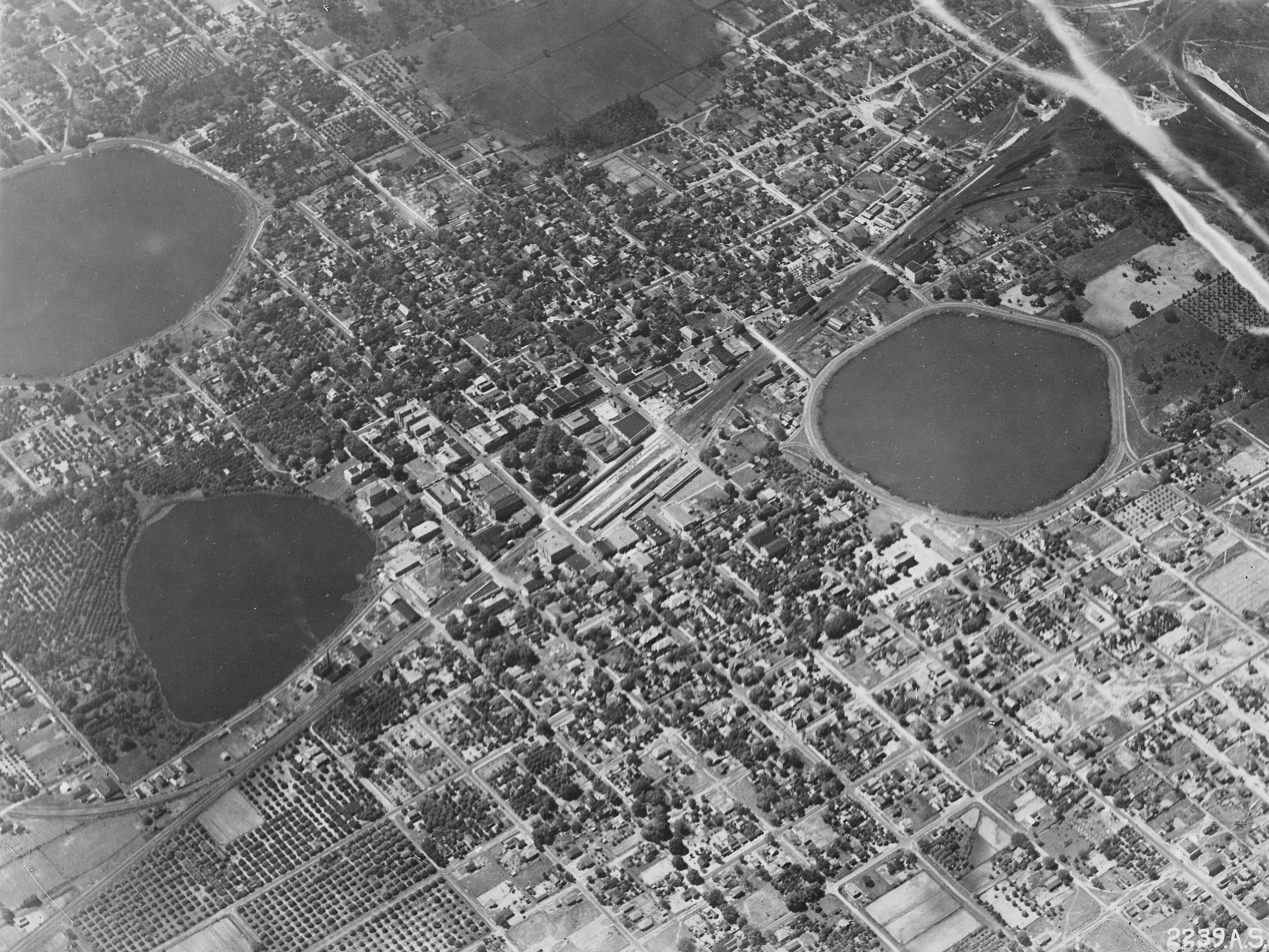
View of Lakeland, April 1922

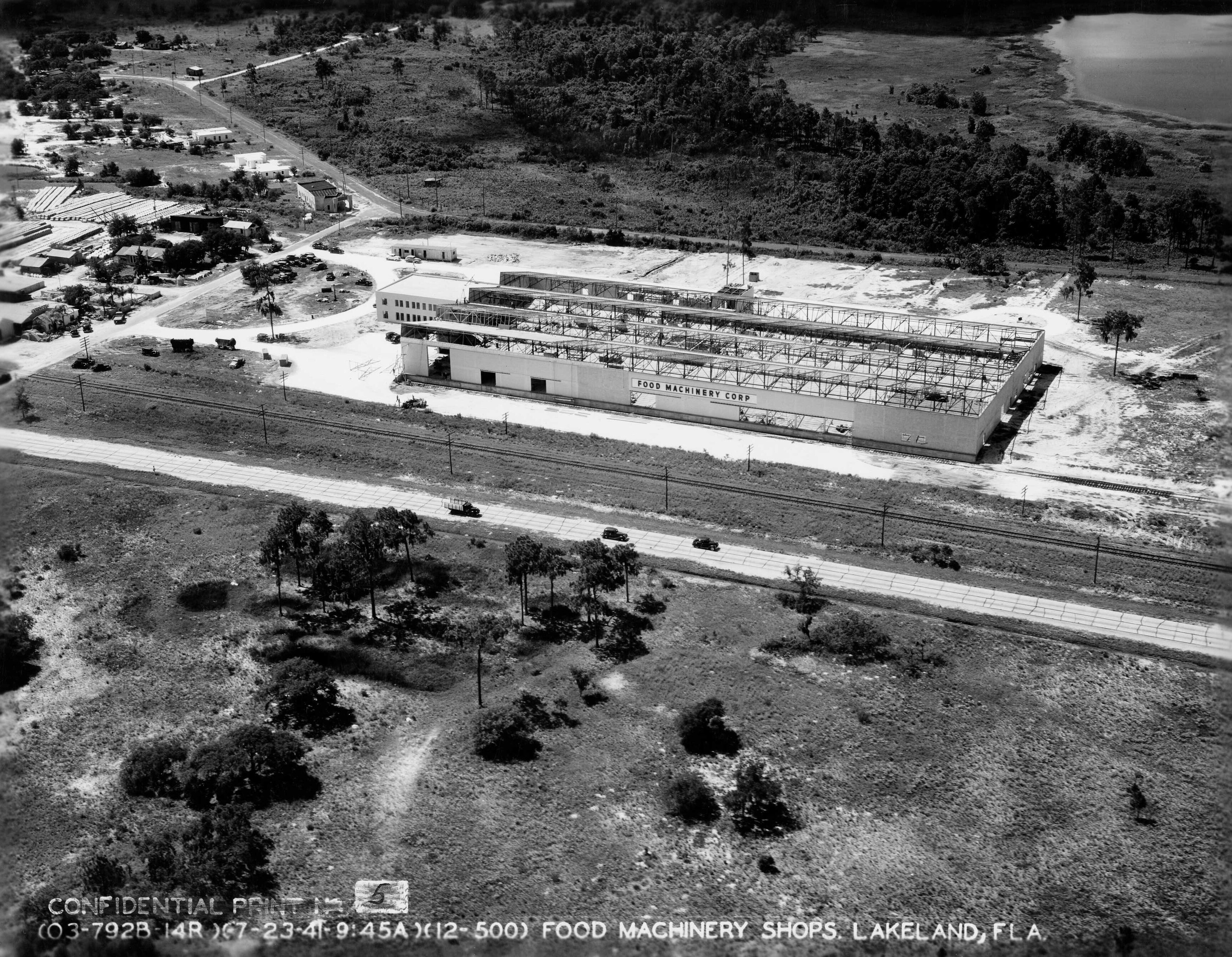
Factory under construction, August 1941

The Florida boom resulted in the construction of many significant structures in Lakeland, a number of which are now listed on the National Register of Historic Places. This list includes the Terrace Hotel, New Florida Hotel (Regency Tower, currently Lake Mirror Tower), Polk Theatre, Frances Langford Promenade, Polk Museum of Art (not a product of the 1920s boom), Park Trammell Building (formerly the Lakeland Public Library and today the Lakeland Chamber of Commerce), and others. The city also has several historic districts that have many large buildings built during the 1920s and 1940s. The Cleveland Indians held spring training there from 1923 to 1927 at Henley Field Ball Park. Parks were developed surrounding Lake Mirror, including Barnett Children's Park, Hollis Gardens, and the newest, Allen Kryger Park.

The "boom" period went "bust" quickly, and years passed before the city recovered. Part of the reemergence was due to the arrival of the Detroit Tigers baseball team in 1934 for spring training. The Tigers still train at Lakeland's Joker Marchant Stadium and own the city's Class A Florida State League team, the Lakeland Flying Tigers. In the mid-1930s, the Works Progress Administration built the Lakeland Municipal Airport.

In 1938, Florida Southern College President Ludd Spivey invited architect Frank Lloyd Wright to design a "great education temple in Florida." Wright worked on the project for over 20 years as Spivey found ways to fund it and find construction workers during World War II. Wright's original plan called for 18 structures; in total he designed 30, but only 12 were completed. Wright's textile block motif is used extensively on the campus. The concrete blocks he used are in need of restoration.

Wright titled the project Child of the Sun, describing his Florida Southern buildings as being "out of the ground, into the light, a child of the sun." It is the largest single-site collection of Frank Lloyd Wright buildings in the world, and attracts 30,000 visitors each year. In 1975, the "Florida Southern Architectural District" was added to the National Register of Historic Places. In 2012, Wright's campus was designated as a National Historic Landmark by the National Park Service.

=== World War II ===
At the beginning of World War II, the Lakeland School of Aeronautics—headquartered at the recently built Lakeland Municipal Airport—became part of a nationwide network of civilian flight schools enjoined for the war effort by the United States Army Air Corps.

Between 1940 and 1945, more than 8,000 Army Air Corps and Army Air Forces cadets trained on two-seater Stearman PT-17 and PT-13 biplanes at the school (renamed the Lodwick School of Aeronautics in the midst of this period).

From June 1941 until October 1942, 1,327 British Royal Air Force cadets trained at the Lakeland facility. The Lodwick School of Aeronautics closed in 1945. The airport ceased flight operations in the 1960; the site has since then housed the Detroit Tigers' "Tiger Town" baseball complex.

== Geography ==
According to the United States Census Bureau, the city has an area of 67 sq mi (173.5 km^{2}), of which 45.84 sq mi (118.7 km^{2}) is land and 5.61 sq mi (14.5 km^{2}) (10.90%) is covered by water. Lakeland is within the Central Florida Highlands area of the Atlantic coastal plain, with a terrain consisting of flatland interspersed with gently rolling hills.

=== Lakes ===
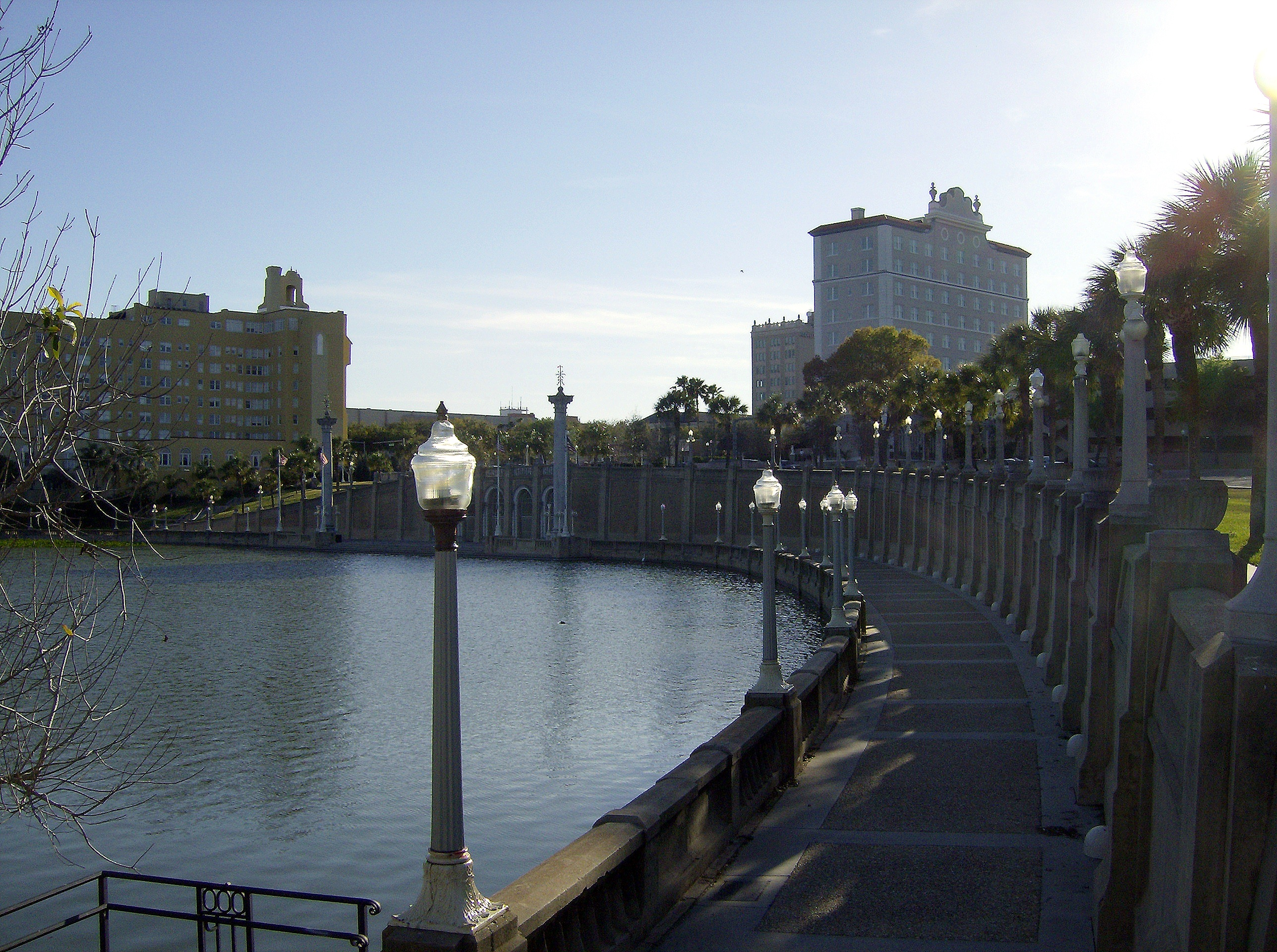
Lake Mirror Park in downtown Lakeland, with surrounding City Hall and Lakeland Terrace Hotel

The dominant feature in Lakeland is the city's many lakes. Thirty-eight lakes are named, with a number of other bodies of water unnamed, mostly phosphate mine pits that eventually filled with water. The largest of these is Lake Parker, which is 2,550 acres (10.3 km^{2}) in size. Much of the culture of Lakeland revolves around its many lakes, and many people use the lakes as reference points in much the same way people in other towns use streets as reference points, such as "I live near Lake Beulah." In addition to Lake Parker, some of the more prominent lakes in the Lakeland area are Lake Hollingsworth, Lake Morton, Lake Mirror, and Lake Gibson.

Swans are one of the most visible features on the lakes near downtown Lakeland. They have a long history, the first swans appearing around 1923. By 1954, the swans were gone, eradicated by alligators and pets. A Lakeland resident who mourned the passing of the swans wrote to Queen Elizabeth II. The royal family allowed the capture of two of the royal swans, and the swans now on the lakes of Lakeland are the descendants of the one surviving royal swan sent by the Queen.

In July 2006, Scott Lake, one of the city's lakes, was almost totally drained by a cluster of sinkholes. Later the lake partially refilled.

=== Climate ===
Lakeland, like most other parts of Florida north of Lake Okeechobee, is in the humid subtropical zone (Köppen climate classification: Cfa). Typically, summers are hot and humid with high temperatures seldom dropping below 90 °F and 70 °F for the overnight low. Like most of Central Florida, afternoon thunderstorms are the norm throughout the summer. Winters in Lakeland are drier and warm, with frequent sunny skies. High temperatures range in the mid 70s during the day, with lows in the 50s. Cold snaps drop temperatures below freezing twice a year on average.

Climate data for Lakeland, Florida, 1991–2020 normals, extremes 1948–present
Month	Jan	Feb	Mar	Apr	May	Jun	Jul	Aug	Sep	Oct	Nov	Dec	Year
Record high °F (°C)	91 (33)	90 (32)	92 (33)	96 (36)	103 (39)	105 (41)	102 (39)	100 (38)	99 (37)	96 (36)	93 (34)	89 (32)	105 (41)
Mean maximum °F (°C)	83.1 (28.4)	85.2 (29.6)	87.9 (31.1)	91.5 (33.1)	95.2 (35.1)	96.2 (35.7)	96.3 (35.7)	96.0 (35.6)	94.3 (34.6)	91.4 (33.0)	87.2 (30.7)	83.8 (28.8)	97.3 (36.3)
Mean daily maximum °F (°C)	73.7 (23.2)	76.7 (24.8)	80.2 (26.8)	85.1 (29.5)	89.5 (31.9)	91.3 (32.9)	92.1 (33.4)	92.2 (33.4)	90.3 (32.4)	85.9 (29.9)	79.8 (26.6)	75.6 (24.2)	84.4 (29.1)
Daily mean °F (°C)	62.2 (16.8)	65.0 (18.3)	68.3 (20.2)	73.2 (22.9)	78.2 (25.7)	81.8 (27.7)	83.2 (28.4)	83.3 (28.5)	81.7 (27.6)	76.4 (24.7)	69.2 (20.7)	64.8 (18.2)	73.9 (23.3)
Mean daily minimum °F (°C)	50.6 (10.3)	53.3 (11.8)	56.5 (13.6)	61.4 (16.3)	66.9 (19.4)	72.3 (22.4)	74.2 (23.4)	74.4 (23.6)	73.1 (22.8)	66.9 (19.4)	58.6 (14.8)	53.9 (12.2)	63.5 (17.5)
Mean minimum °F (°C)	31.2 (−0.4)	34.7 (1.5)	39.7 (4.3)	47.9 (8.8)	57.2 (14.0)	66.8 (19.3)	69.9 (21.1)	70.3 (21.3)	66.6 (19.2)	51.7 (10.9)	42.0 (5.6)	35.5 (1.9)	29.3 (−1.5)
Record low °F (°C)	20 (−7)	24 (−4)	25 (−4)	35 (2)	47 (8)	56 (13)	64 (18)	63 (17)	61 (16)	38 (3)	28 (−2)	20 (−7)	20 (−7)
Average precipitation inches (mm)	2.99 (76)	2.33 (59)	3.06 (78)	2.82 (72)	3.80 (97)	8.69 (221)	8.85 (225)	9.08 (231)	7.62 (194)	3.04 (77)	1.93 (49)	2.61 (66)	56.82 (1,443)
Average precipitation days (≥ 0.01 in)	6.9	6.4	5.4	5.4	7.8	16.5	19.0	18.7	14.9	7.5	5.1	7.1	120.7
Source: NOAA

== Demographics ==
Historical population
Census	Pop.	Note	%±
1890	552		—
1900	1,180		113.8%
1910	3,719		215.2%
1920	7,062		89.9%
1930	18,554		162.7%
1940	22,068		18.9%
1950	30,851		39.8%
1960	41,350		34.0%
1970	42,803		3.5%
1980	47,406		10.8%
1990	70,576		48.9%
2000	78,452		11.2%
2010	97,422		24.2%
2020	112,641		15.6%
2025 (est.)	125,520		11.4%
U.S. Decennial Census

=== 2010 and 2020 census ===
Lakeland, Florida – Racial and ethnic composition Note: the US Census treats Hispanic/Latino as an ethnic category. This table excludes Latinos from the racial categories and assigns them to a separate category. Hispanics/Latinos may be of any race.
Race / Ethnicity (NH = Non-Hispanic)	Pop 2000	Pop 2010	Pop 2020	% 2000	% 2010	% 2020
White (NH)	54,555	61,468	61,372	69.54%	63.09%	54.48%
Black or African American (NH)	16,500	19,788	20,963	21.03%	20.31%	18.61%
Native American or Alaska Native (NH)	176	253	258	0.22%	0.26%	0.23%
Asian (NH)	1,040	1,717	2,437	1.33%	1.76%	2.16%
Pacific Islander or Native Hawaiian (NH)	35	62	55	0.04%	0.06%	0.05%
Some other race (NH)	92	167	613	0.12%	0.17%	0.54%
Two or more races/Multiracial (NH)	1,022	1,696	4,241	1.30%	1.74%	3.77%
Hispanic or Latino (any race)	5,032	12,271	22,702	6.41%	12.60%	20.15%
Total	78,452	97,422	112,641	100.00%	100.00%	100.00%

As of the 2020 United States census, there were 112,641 people, 41,750 households, and 24,433 families residing in the city.

As of the 2010 United States census, there were 97,422 people, 40,529 households, and 24,654 families residing in the city.

Between 2008 and 2012, the per capita income was $23,817 and the median household income was $40,284. Persons below the poverty line in 2008–2012 were 17.5% according to the US Census.

=== 2000 census ===
As of 2000, 23.5% had children under the age of 18 living with them, 43.5% were married couples living together, 13.7% had a female householder with no husband present, and 39% were individuals and nontraditional families. About 32.9% of all households were made up of individuals, and 14.9% had someone living alone who was 65 years of age or older. The average household size was 2.23 and the average family size was 2.82.

In 2000, the city the population was spread out, with 21.4% under the age of 18, 10.3% from 18 to 24, 24.7% from 25 to 44, 20.6% from 45 to 64, and 23.0% who were 65 years of age or older. The median age was 40 years. For every 100 females, there were 86.8 males. For every 100 females age 18 and over, there were 82.1 males.

In 2000, the median income for a household in the city was $16,119, and for a family was $17,468. Males had a median income of $14,137 versus $9,771 for females. The per capita income for the city was $15,760. About 47% of families and 35% of the population were below the poverty line, including 97% of those under age 18 and 9% of those age 65 or over.

=== Languages ===
As of 2000, those who spoke only English at home accounted for 91% of all residents, while 9% spoke other languages at home. The most significant were Spanish speakers who made up 6.4% of the population, while German came up as the third-most spoken language, which made up 0.8%, and French was fourth, with 0.5% of the population.

=== Religion ===
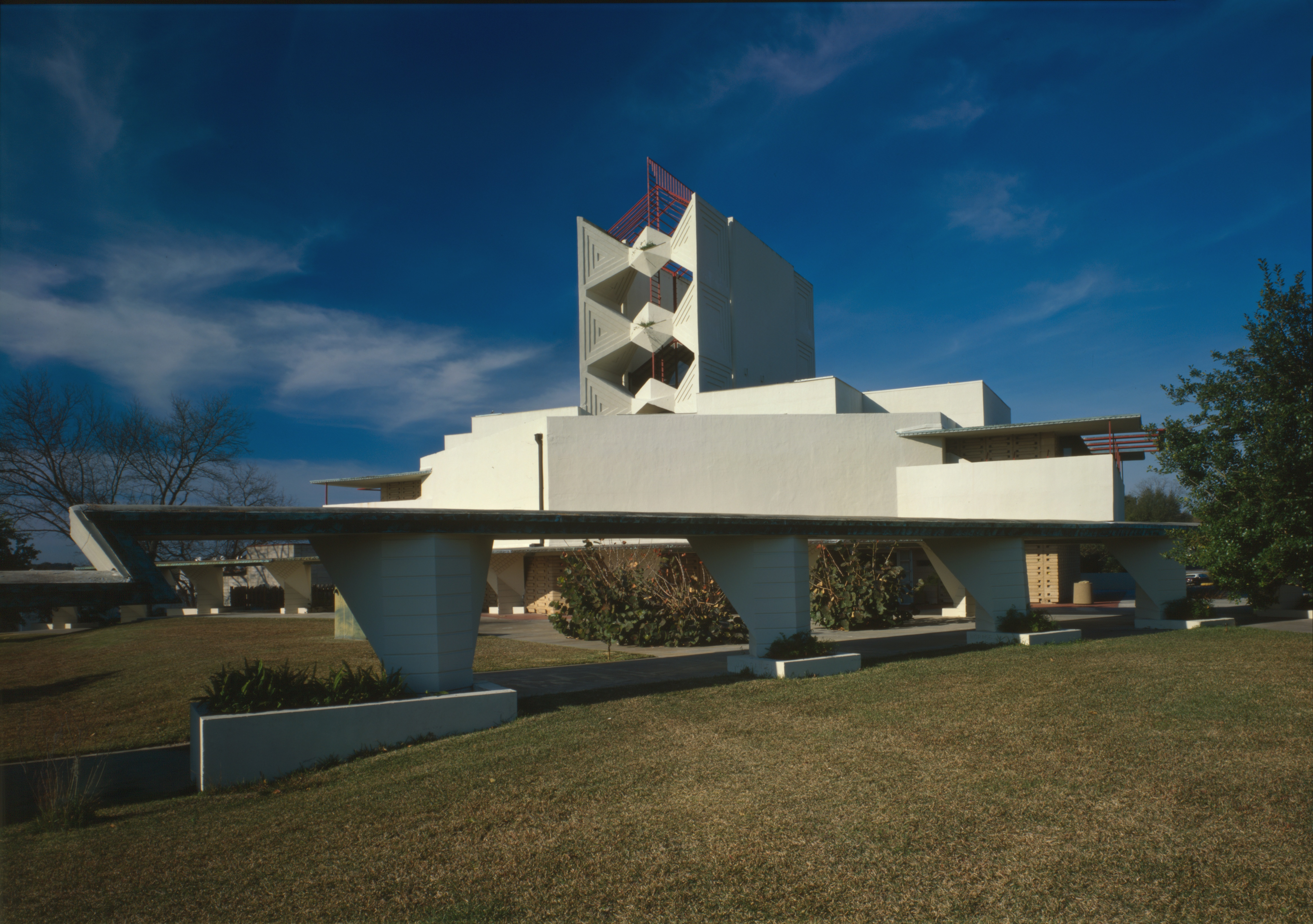
Annie Pfeiffer Chapel

In 1913, the Wolfson family arrived from Lithuania and became the first Jewish settlers to the area. The first synagogue, Temple Emanuel, opened in 1932. The Rohr Jewish Learning Institute presents classes and seminars in Lakeland in partnership with Chabad of Lakeland.

Lakeland is home to the Swaminarayan Hindu Temple, which was established in 2005.

In 1994, the first and only mosque in the county was established. It was called Masjid Aisha, but is now called the Islamic Center of Lakeland.

Christianity makes up the largest religious group in Lakeland. As of 2013, an estimated 300 churches existed with an address in the city.

== Economy ==
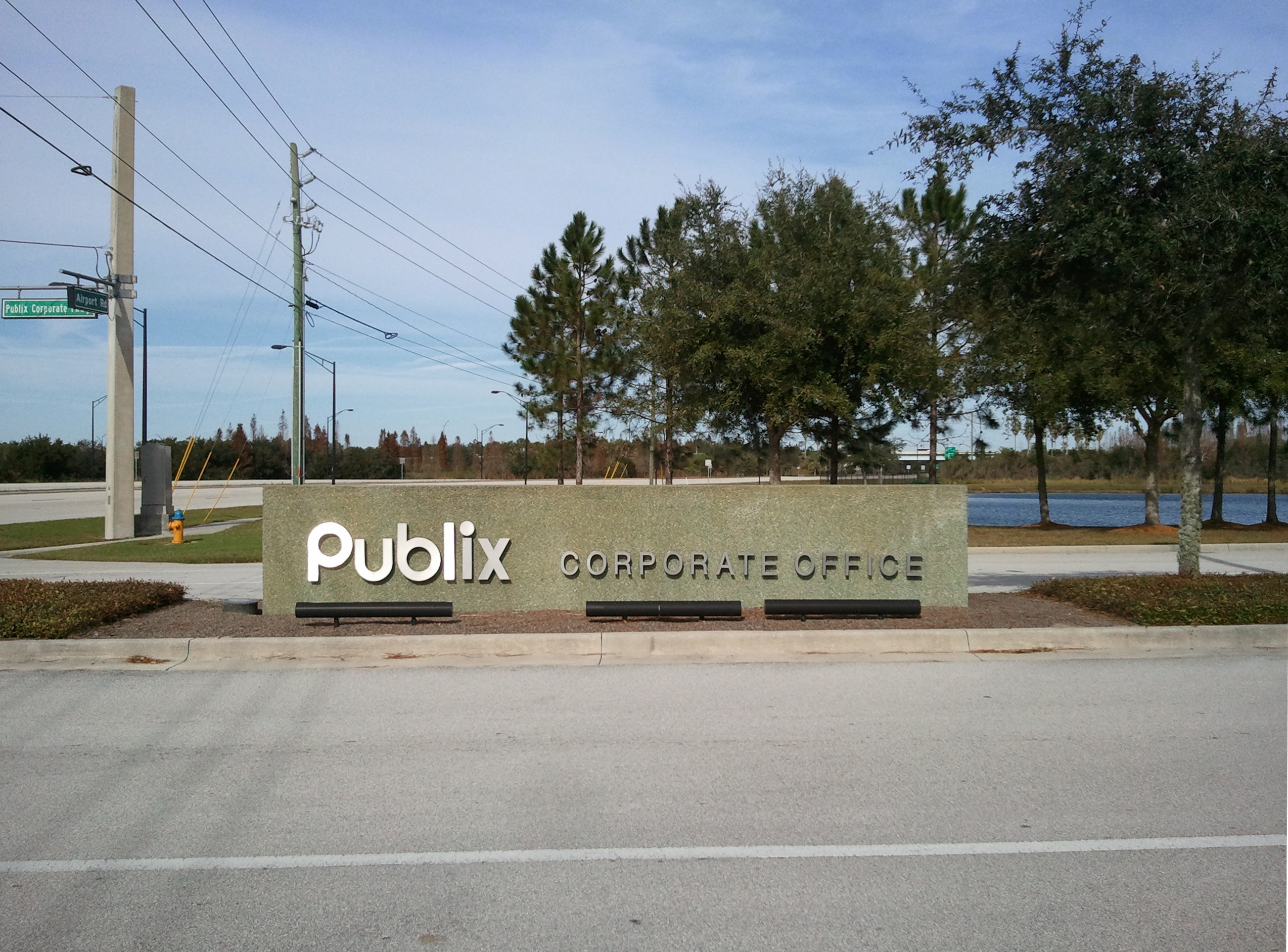
Publix headquarters

Lakeland is the largest city on Interstate 4 between Orlando and Tampa. Large industries in the Lakeland area are citrus, cattle, and phosphate mining. In the past few decades, tourism, medicine, insurance, transportation, and music have grown in importance.

Citrus growing dates back to the early settlers who planted trees in the area, in the 1850s. After a series of freezes in counties north of Polk County, the area became the focal point for citrus growing in Florida. Although citrus is no longer the largest industry in the area, it still plays a large part in the economy of Lakeland and Polk County.

Phosphate mining is still important to the economy of Lakeland, although most of the mining now takes place farther south. The Bone Valley produced 25% of the U.S. phosphate supply.

Lakeland's largest employer is Publix Super Markets. Publix is one of the largest regional grocery chains in the United States with over 1,200 stores across the American South. Publix employs over 6,500 people in the Lakeland area including headquarters, Information Technology and warehouse employees.

Lakeland is a transportation hub. FedEx Freight and FedEx Services and the Saddle Creek Corporation employ over 600 people in the area. Other large employers in the area include Amazon, GEICO, Rooms To Go, and Lakeland Regional Health.

== Culture ==
The Lakeland History Room is a special collections archive established in 1987 housed within the Lakeland Public Library's main branch. The Lakeland History Room maintains the city's collection of historical materials as well as other locally relevant collections composed of documents, photographs, maps, building plans, audio/visual media, scrapbooks, specialty items like citrus crate labels, artwork, yearbooks, posters, and postcards. The LHR maintains a large digital collection with over 7,000 images of the city of Lakeland, its landmarks, significant historical moments, cultural institutions, and prominent citizens. The LHR provides one-on-one assistance with historic research, a history lecture series with prominent local historians, a DIY Digitizing Lab for personal material preservation, and genealogical programs and resources.

In 2019, an initiative led by Lakeland City Commissioner Phillip Walker, was first presented to the City Commission to create the city's first History and Culture Center. The project was unanimously approved by the commission and funds were allocated for the project's construction; although, the exhibit's content design would be funded by local donations and grant funding. An advisory committee made up of educators, city officials, local business owners, and civic and community leaders, led by former Mayor Gow Fields, was established to organize and advise the City in the design, content, and construction of the exhibit. The Lakeland Public Library was eventually chosen as the location of the future exhibit space due to its central location within the city, its status as a community hub, and because it was the current home of the city's local archive, the Lakeland History Room, which would be expanded into the Lakeland History and Culture Center. The History and Culture Center opened to the public in September 2022.

=== Historic districts ===
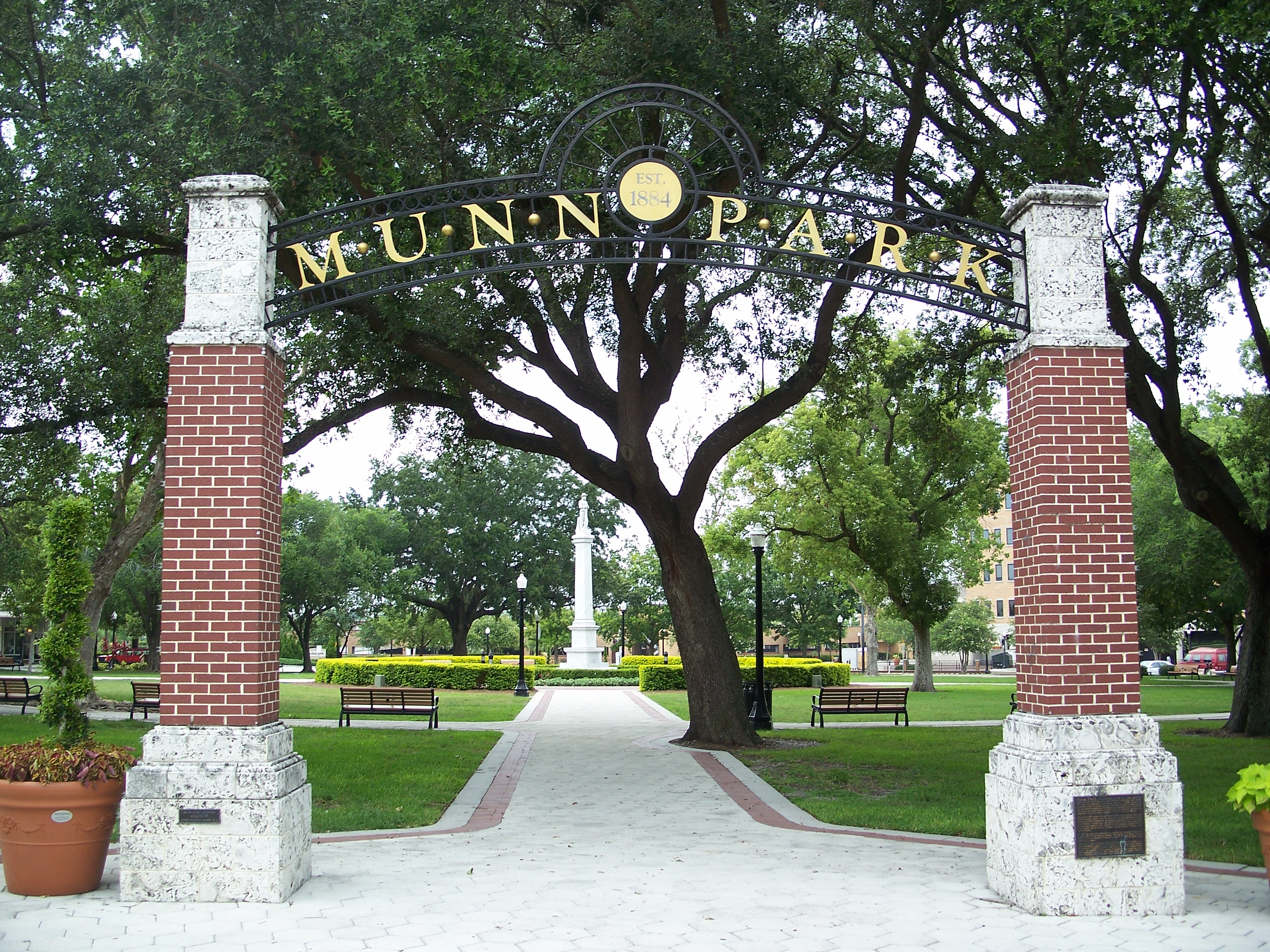
Munn Park

- Beacon Hill-Alta Vista Residential District
- Biltmore-Cumberland Historic District
- Dixieland Historic District
- East Lake Morton Residential District
- Lake Hunter Terrace Historic District
- Munn Park Historic District
- South Lake Morton Historic District

=== Buildings and locations ===
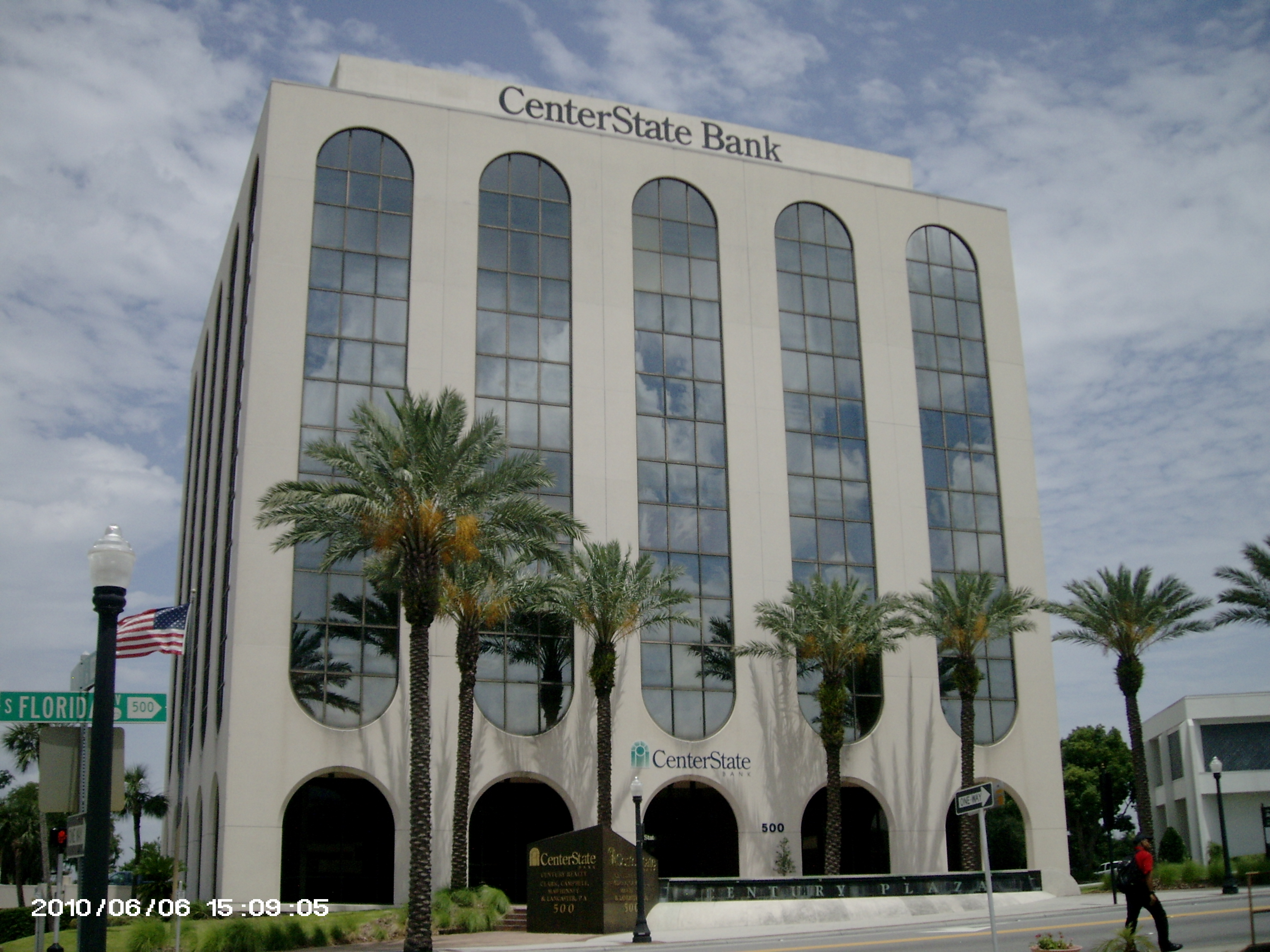
Century Plaza in Downtown Lakeland

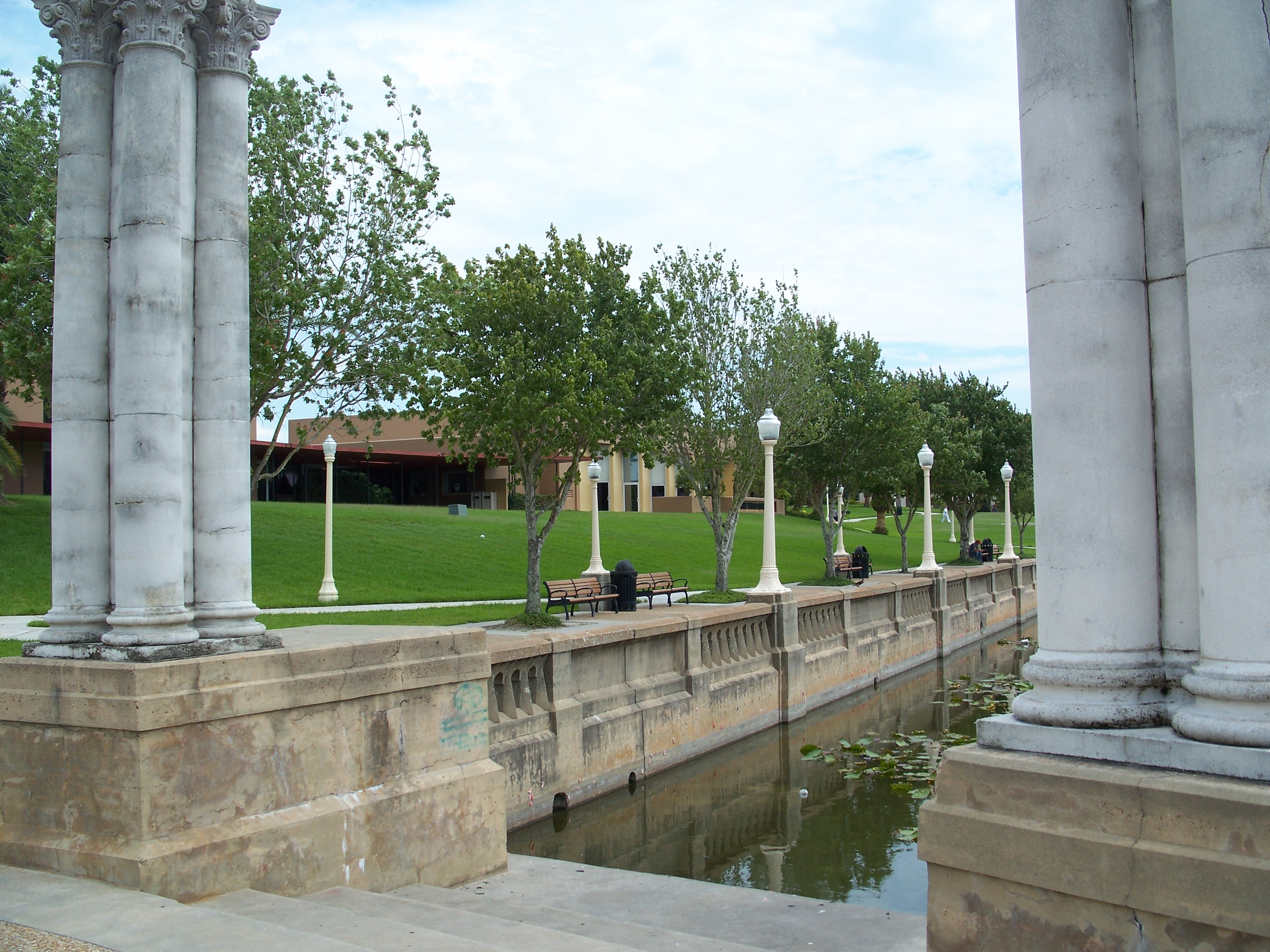
Frances Langford Promenade

- Central Avenue School
- Cleveland Court School
- Florida Southern College
- John F. Cox Grammar School
- Lakeland Center
- Lakeland Square Mall
- Lakeside Village
- Old Lakeland High School
- James Henry Mills Medal of Honor Parkway
- Oates Building
- Polk State College
- Polk Museum of Art
- Polk Theatre
- Southeastern University (Florida)
- USA International Speedway
- Florida Polytechnic University
- Winston School
- Without Walls Central Church – a local/regional megachurch
- Silvermoon Drive-in
- Bonnet Springs

=== Libraries ===
- Lakeland Public Library
- Larry R. Jackson Branch Library
- eLibrary South Lakeland

== Sports ==
Club	Sport	Founded	Current league	Stadium
Lakeland Flying Tigers	Baseball	1960	Florida State League	Publix Field at Joker Marchant Stadium
Lakeland Pilots	Baseball	1955	Florida State League	Henley Field
Florida Complex League Tigers	Baseball	1995	Florida Complex League	Publix Field at Joker Marchant Stadium
Lakeland Magic	Basketball	2017-2023	NBA G League	RP Funding Center
Florida Southern Mocs	Multi-sport	1883	NCAA DII	George W. Jenkins Field House; Henley Field; Moccasin Field
Southeastern Fire	Multi-sport	2014	NAIA	Victory Field; The Furnace; Ted A. Broer Stadium
Caledonia SC	Soccer	2022	USL League Two	
Lakeland Tropics	Soccer	2017	UPSL	Bryant Stadium
Lakeland United FC	Soccer	2022	UPSL	
Florida Tropics SC	Indoor soccer	2016	Major Arena Soccer League	RP Funding Center
Lakeland Renegades	Rugby league	2019	USA Rugby League	All Saints' Academy
Lakeland NightShade	eSports	2019	Florida eSports League	

=== Stadiums ===
Joker Marchant Stadium, north of downtown, hosts spring training for the Detroit Tigers, as well as their Lakeland Flying Tigers class-A Florida State League and GCL Tigers rookie-league Gulf Coast League minor league baseball teams.

RP Funding Center is also home to two indoor sports teams. The Lakeland Magic is a basketball team playing in the NBA G League and is an affiliate of the Orlando Magic. The Florida Tropics SC is an indoor soccer team playing in the Major Arena Soccer League. The Tropics organization also operates an outdoor team, the Lakeland Tropics, which competes in the Premier Development League. The Florida Tarpons were an indoor football team playing in the American Arena League for one season after relocating from Estero, Florida.

=== History of sports teams ===
In 1919, the Lakeland Highlanders were charter members of the six-team, Class D level Florida State League. The Bartow Polkers, Bradenton Growers, Orlando Caps Sanford Celeryfeds and Tampa Smokers teams joined Lakeland as Florida State League charter members. The Highlanders played in the league through 1926 and were followed in minor league play by the Lakeland Pilots who played from 1946 to 1955. The Lakeland Highlanders and Pilots played home games at Henley Field.

In the 1980s, the Lakeland Center briefly played host to the indoor version of the Tampa Bay Rowdies soccer team. The Lakeland Center has also hosted a few hockey teams, the Lakeland Ice Warriors, the Lakeland Prowlers, and the Lakeland Loggerheads. The United States Basketball League once had a team here as well called the Lakeland Blue Ducks. Sun 'n Fun was home to Lakeland's only roller derby league, the Lakeland Derby Dames; however, the team was dissolved in November 2015.

The Lakeland Center also hosts the Florida High School Athletic Association's state basketball finals.

== Government and politics ==
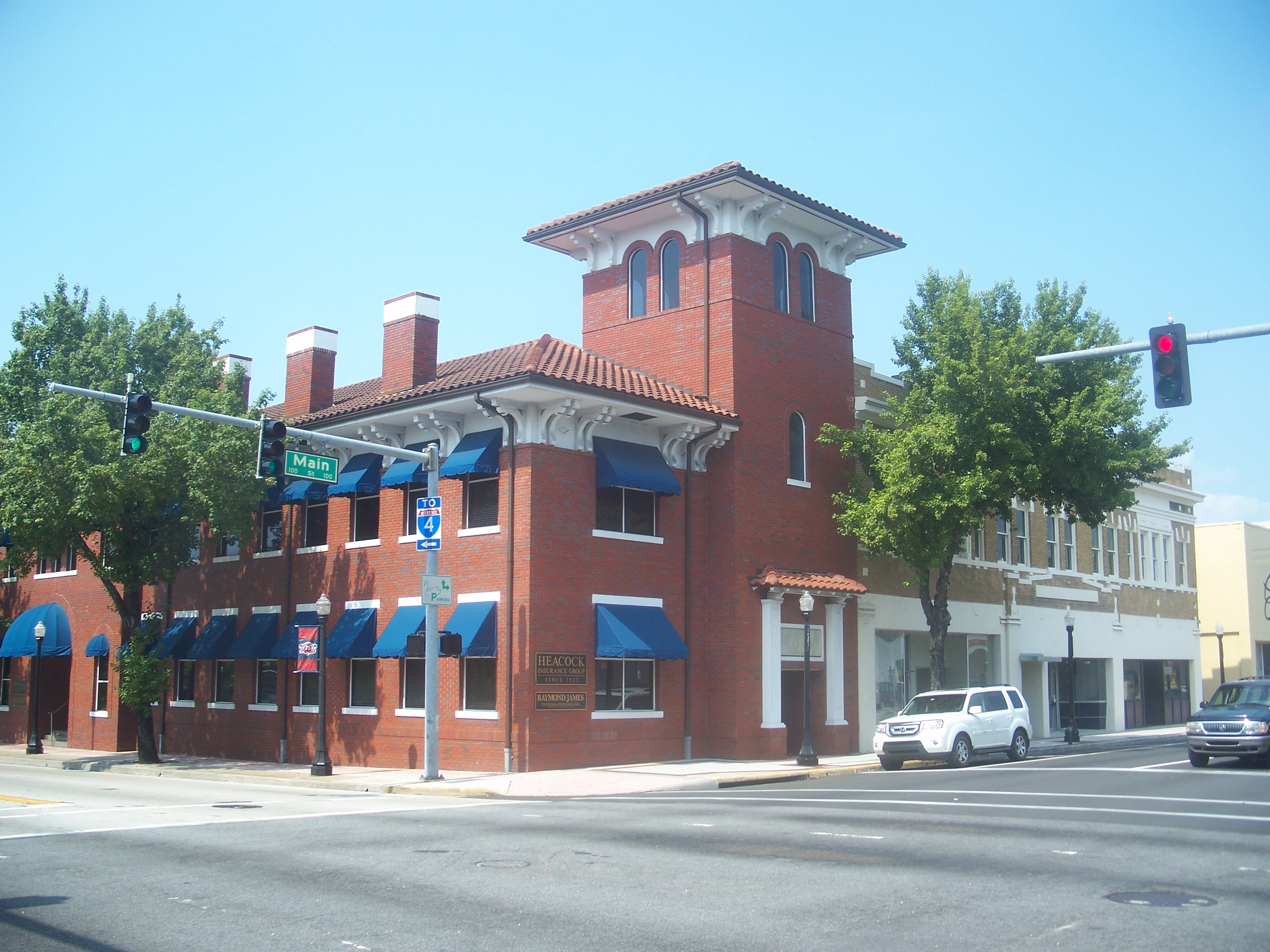
Former Lakeland city hall, built 1913

Lakeland is governed by a six-member city council. Four members are elected from single-member districts; the other two are elected at-large, requiring them to gain a majority of the votes. The mayor is elected.

=== Mayor ===
The City of Lakeland was incorporated on January 1, 1885. The mayor is one of seven members of the City Commission, acting as the board chair and performing mostly ceremonial and procedural duties beyond the powers of the other six. Prior to 1988, the City Commission selected Lakeland's mayor from among its members. Mayors can be on the board for up to 12 years in a lifetime, or 16 years in combination with holding a regular commission position. Lakeland's first mayor was J.W. Trammell.

The first female mayor was Lois Q. Searl, who served in 1965. The 1970 municipal election placed the first African-American on the City Commission, Dr. John S. Jackson. In 1972, he became the first black mayor for the city. In 1980, Carrie R. Oldham became Lakeland's first African-American female mayor.

Since 1988, the mayor has been elected by the city's voters.

=== Law enforcement ===
On September 28, 2006, Polk County Sheriff's Deputy Vernon "Matt" Williams and his K-9 partner Diogi were shot and killed after a routine traffic stop in the Wabash area of Lakeland. More than 500 police officers from a variety of law enforcement agencies joined in a search for Angilo Freeland, suspected of murdering Williams and stealing his gun. Freeland was found hiding in a rural area the next morning. Nine officers from five different law enforcement agencies surrounded Freeland and shot him when he raised Williams' stolen gun at them. A total of 110 shots were fired, and Freeland was hit 68 times, killing him instantly. Multiple investigations concluded the officers' use of force was justified. Deputy Williams and Diogi were laid to rest on October 3, 2006, after a funeral that included a one-hour-and-45-minute procession to Auburndale.

In 2021, the Lakeland Police Department hired numerous former NYPD officers. Two of the new hires failed to disclose that they had been disciplined by the NYPD, and one new hire used to work in the NYPD's notorious anti-crime units which were disbanded after high-profile scandals.

== Education ==
The 28 elementary schools, seven middle schools, five traditional high schools, and three magnet-choice high schools in the Lakeland area are run by the Polk County School Board.

=== Traditional public high schools ===
- George W. Jenkins High School
- Kathleen High School
- Lake Gibson High School
- Lakeland Senior High School
- Tenoroc High School

=== Magnet high schools ===
- Central Florida Aerospace Academy
- Lois Cowles Harrison Center for the Visual and Performing Arts
- Polk State College Lakeland Collegiate High School

=== Traditional public middle schools ===
- Kathleen Middle School
- Lake Gibson Middle School
- Crystal Lake Middle school
- Sleepy Hill Middle School
- Lakeland Highlands Middle School
- Southwest Middle School

=== Magnet middle schools ===
- Lawton Chiles Middle School
- Rochelle School of the Arts (elementary and middle)

=== Charter schools ===
- McKeel Academy of Technology
- South Mckeel Academy
- Mckeel Academy Central
- Lakeland Montessori Schoolhouse
- Lakeland Montessori Middle School
- Lakeland Collegiate High school
- Magnolia Montessori Academy

=== Private schools ===
- Calvary Baptist Church Academy
- Geneva Classical Academy
- Heritage Christian Academy
- Lakeland Christian Preparatory School
- Lakeland Christian School
- Parkway Christian Academy
- Resurrection Catholic School
- Santa Fe Catholic High School
- Sonrise Christian School
- St Anthony
- St Joseph
- St Lukes
- St Paul Lutheran School
- Victory Christian Academy
- Excel Christian Academy
- Lakes Church Academy

=== Colleges and universities ===
- Florida Polytechnic University
- Florida Southern College
- Florida Technical College
- Keiser University
- Webster University
- Polk State College
- Southeastern University
- Whitefield Theological Seminary

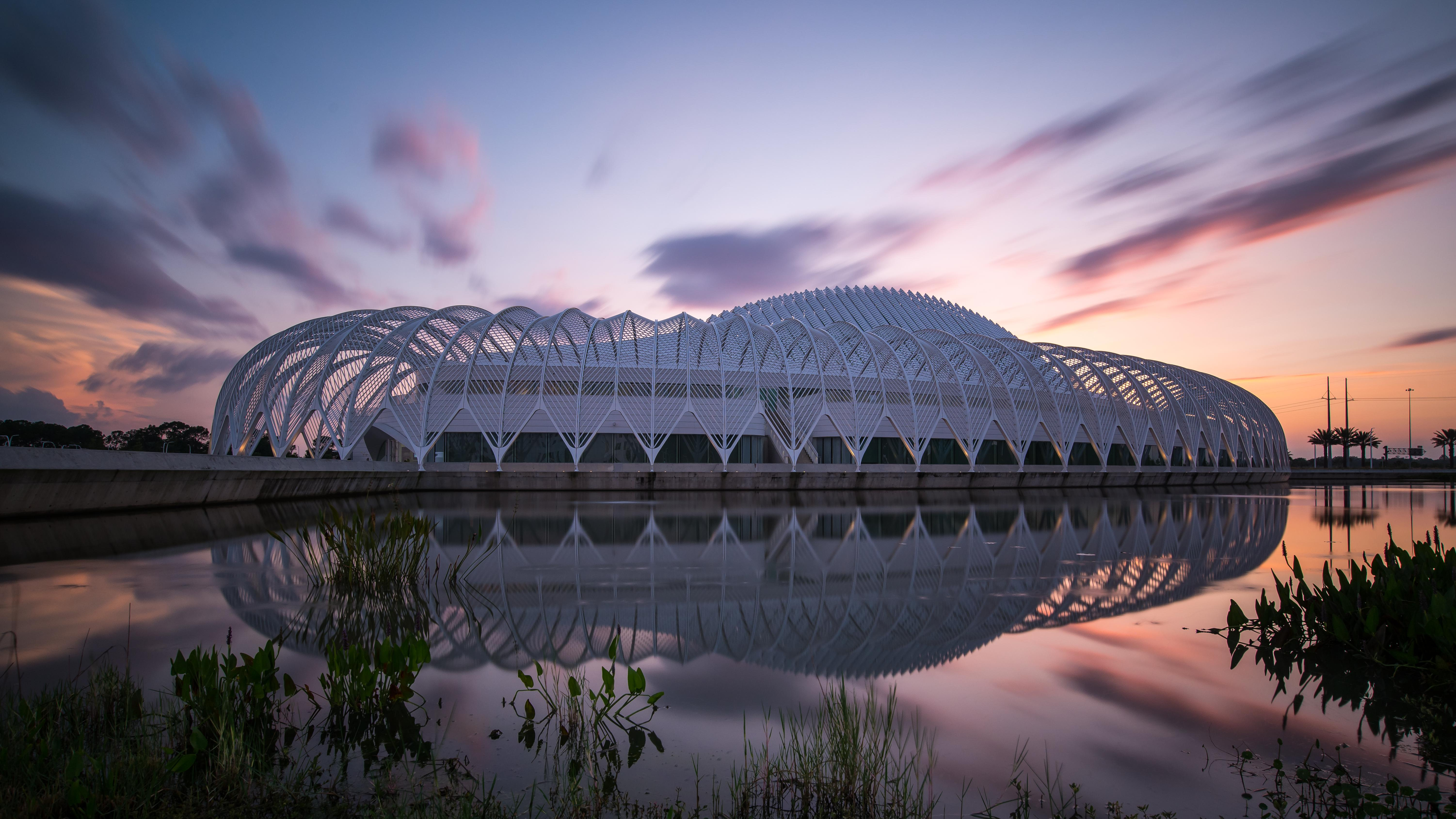
The IST building of Florida Polytechnic University

A number of opportunities exist for higher education around the Lakeland area. Southeastern University is the largest university in the area, with undergraduate enrollment around 6200. Southeastern is affiliated with the Assemblies of God. Florida Southern College, established in 1883 and with a current undergraduate enrollment of just over 2600, is on Lake Hollingsworth. Florida Southern is the home of the world's largest single-site collection of Frank Lloyd Wright architecture. In July 2008, the University of South Florida's Lakeland campus was granted partial autonomy by Governor Charlie Crist and became Florida Polytechnic University. Florida Polytechnic (FLPoly) is just inside the Lakeland's northeast border at the intersection of I-4 and Polk Parkway. They also have some administrative offices on the campus of Polk State College on Winter Lake Road. FLPoly is focused on STEM degree programs, such as engineering and computer science. Both Everest University and Keiser University, two multisite, accredited universities, have locations in Lakeland. Traviss Career Center is a vocational school. Webster University offers on-site, regionally accredited graduate degree programs in business and counseling at their Lakeland Metropolitan Campus

== Media ==
Polk County is within the Tampa Bay television market. Charter Spectrum is the cable television franchise serving Lakeland, which offers most television stations from the Tampa Bay market, as well as WFTV, the ABC affiliate from Orlando. WMOR-TV, an independent television station, is licensed to Lakeland, with its studios in Tampa and its transmitter in Riverview.

Lakeland and Polk County are within its own radio market. Local radio stations include:

- WLKF 1430 AM
- WONN 1230 AM
- WWAB 1330 AM
- WPCV 97.5 FM
- WWRZ 98.3 FM

WLLD 94.1 FM is licensed to Lakeland, but has wider focus on the Tampa Bay area, with studios in St. Petersburg. WKES 91.1 FM is also licensed to Lakeland as part of the statewide Moody Radio Florida network, with studios in Seminole, near St. Petersburg. Most major stations from Tampa Bay and a few from Orlando are also available.

Print media include The Ledger, a local newspaper owned by USA Today Co.. Patterson Jacobs Media Group publishes a magazine, The Lakelander.

LkldNow is a nonprofit digital news organization that covers Lakeland news.

== Infrastructure ==
=== Transportation ===
Because Lakeland is the largest city on I-4 between Tampa and Orlando, the city is an important transportation hub. The county nickname, Imperial Polk County, was coined because a large bond issue in 1914 enabled wide roads between the cities of Polk County.

The important freeways and highways in Lakeland today are:

- I-4 is the main interstate in Central Florida linking Tampa, Lakeland, Orlando, and Daytona Beach.
- SR 570 (or Polk Parkway), is a tolled beltway around Lakeland, with both ends terminating at I-4. Although its shape, location, and tolls makes it impractical as a "bypass" road, it is useful as a way of getting from part of town to another and providing access to I-4 from most parts of the city.
- US 92, following Memorial Boulevard for most of the city, was the route leading to both Tampa and Orlando before I-4 was built; US 92 is still a main road leading to Plant City going west, and Auburndale, Winter Haven, and Haines City going east.
- US 98, going south, follows Bartow Road and leads to Bartow, the county seat. Heading north out of town, it provides a route to Dade City.
- SR 33, following mostly rural land, provides access to Lake County and the Florida's Turnpike.
- SR 37, following Florida Avenue, the main north–south route in Lakeland, is also the main road leading south to Mulberry.
- SR 540, Winter-Lake Road, is in southern Lakeland, leading to Winter Haven and Legoland Florida.

==== Bicycle routes ====
In recent years, the Lakeland area has developed a number of paved, multi-use bicycle routes including the Lake-To-Lakes Trail, which runs from Lake Parker through downtown, past several lakes, ending at Lake John. Other routes include University Trail, which connects Polk State College to Florida Polytechnic University, and the Fort Fraser Trail, which runs along US Highway 98 from Polk State College to Highway 60 in Bartow.

==== Public transportation ====
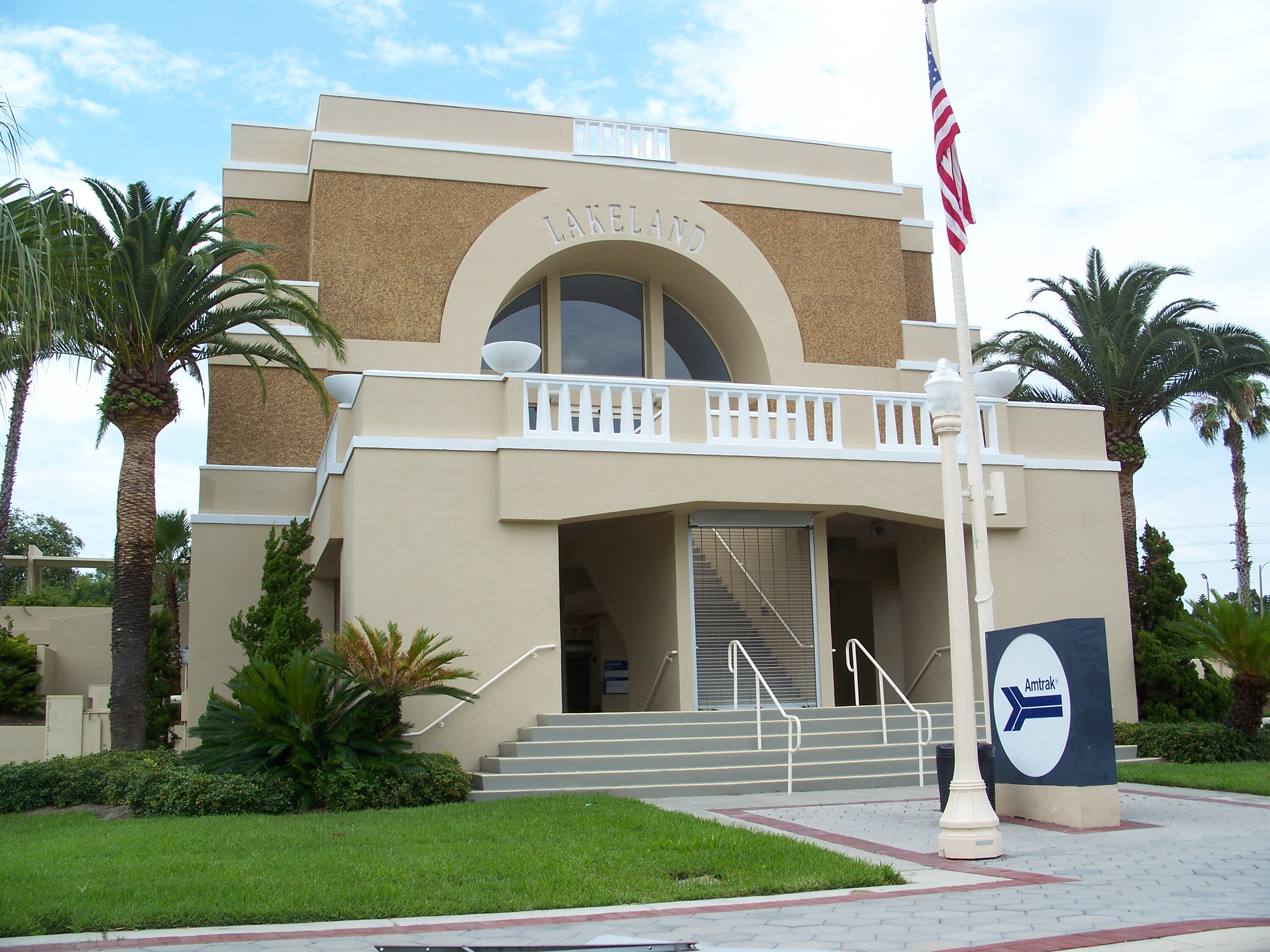
Lakeland Amtrak Station

- Lakeland Amtrak Station
- Lakeland Linder International Airport In 2017, Linder received its first international flight and was renamed Lakeland Linder International Airport in 2018.
- Lakeland Greyhound Terminal
- Citrus Connection local bus service.

=== Utilities ===
Water and wastewater in the Lakeland area is managed by Lakeland Water Utilities, municipal water supply is treated at local water plants, T.B. Williams and C. Wayne Combee. The water is mainly supplied by wells that draw from the Floridan aquifer. Power is generated by a nonprofit public power utility, Lakeland Electric.

Lakeland Electric is a municipal utility and government department of the city of Lakeland, Florida. Lakeland was the third city in the state of Florida to have electric lighting powered in 1891 by The Lakeland Light and Power Company after Jacksonville and Tampa. Over a decade later in 1904, citizens purchased the private light power plant for $7,500 establishing the locally owned, municipal utility known today as Lakeland Electric.

==== Power plants ====
Lakeland Electric powers the city of Lakeland by two power plants, C.D. McIntosh Power Plant, coal-natural gas combined cycle plant slated to phase out in 2024, and Larsen Memorial. The last coal unit at C.D. McIntosh Power Plant was phased out in January 2024, a plan presented by the Lakeland Electric staff in 2019.

== Notable people ==
=== Entertainment ===
- Nat Adderley, jazz cornetist and composer
- Lindsey Alley, Mouseketeer and actress
- Bobby Braddock, record producer in Country Music Hall of Fame
- Charleene Closshey, film/Broadway actress, musician, and producer
- Copeland, pop/alternative rock band
- Jonny Diaz, Christian musician
- Samantha Dorman, Playboy Playmate
- Rhea Durham, Victoria's Secret model
- Faith Evans, singer
- Stephen Baron Johnson, painter
- Frances Langford, singer, actress, and radio star (1930s and 1940s)
- Neva Jane Langley, Miss America 1953
- Mike Marshall, bluegrass musician and mandolinist
- Kara Monaco, Playboy Playmate
- Robert Phillips, guitarist
- Lauren Miller Rogen, actress
- Forrest Sawyer, NBC reporter and anchor
- SoulJa, rapper
- Steve1989MREInfo, YouTube personality
- J. D. Sumner, singer and songwriter
- Dan White (1908–1980), American actor in film and television
- Rick Yancey, author
- Monte Yoho, drummer for Outlaws

=== Sports ===
- George Almones, NBA Player
- Dwayne Bacon, NBA Player
- Danny Baggish, pro darts player
- Andy Bean, PGA Tour golfer
- Ahmad Black, NFL player, Tampa Bay Buccaneers
- Keon Broxton- Milwaukee Brewers Center Fielder
- Desmond Clark, NFL player, Chicago Bears
- Lance Davis, MLB player, Cincinnati Reds
- Matt Diaz, former MLB player
- Paul Edinger, NFL player, Minnesota Vikings and Chicago Bears
- Justin Forsett, running back, UC Berkeley
- Carson Fulmer, former Vanderbilt baseball player, drafted 8th overall by Chicago White Sox
- Kenneth Gant, NFL safety
- Ronnie Ghent, football player
- Matt Grothe, quarterback, South Florida Bulls
- Nick Hamilton, pro wrestling referee
- Killian Hayes, basketball player
- Alice Haylett, AAGPBL All-Star pitcher
- Kobi Henry, soccer player
- Drew Hutchison, MLB pitcher
- Lee Janzen, PGA Tour golfer, U.S. Open winner
- Ray Lewis, NFL player, Baltimore Ravens, Super Bowl champion and MVP, 2-time NFL Defensive Player of the Year
- Freddie Mitchell, NFL player, Philadelphia Eagles and Kansas City Chiefs
- Joe Nemechek, NASCAR Sprint Cup driver
- Joe Niekro, MLB knuckleball pitcher
- Lance Niekro, MLB player, San Francisco Giants
- Steve Pearce, MLB player, Boston Red Sox
- Maurkice Pouncey, NFL player, Pittsburgh Steelers
- Mike Pouncey, former NFL player
- Boog Powell, former MLB player
- Chris Rainey, NFL player, Pittsburgh Steelers
- Andrew Reynolds, professional skateboarder
- Chris Sale, MLB player, Atlanta Braves
- Brenda Sell, Taekwondo Grandmaster
- Rod Smart, NFL & XFL player
- Donnell Smith, NFL player, Green Bay Packers and New England Patriots
- Ron Smith, NFL player, Los Angeles Rams
- Bill Spivey, basketball player
- Jameson Taillon, MLB pitcher, New York Yankees
- Adarius Taylor, NFL linebacker
- Jim Thomas, NBA player
- Justin Verlander, MLB pitcher, Houston Astros
- Chris Waters, former MLB player
- Brooks Wilson, MLB pitcher, Atlanta Braves
- Alec Asher, former MLB baseball player

=== Other ===
- Charles T. Canady, Chief Justice, Florida Supreme Court
- Lawton Chiles, Senator and Governor of Florida
- Abre' Conner, Director of the Center for Environmental and Climate Justice at the NAACP
- Scott Franklin, U.S. Representative and former Lakeland City Commissioner
- Carol Jenkins Barnett, philanthropist and businesswoman, the daughter of George W. Jenkins
- George W. Jenkins, founder of Publix Super Markets
- Floretta Dukes McKenzie, educator and Superintendent of Washington, D.C. Public Schools
- R. Albert Mohler Jr., president of Southern Baptist Theological Seminary
- Marvin Pipkin, scientist engineer that had many inventions and innovations for the light bulb.
- Gene Ready, Florida businessman and state legislator
- Charles Z. Smith, Associate Justice, Washington State Supreme Court
- Park Trammell, Mayor of Lakeland, Florida Attorney General, Governor of Florida and U.S. Senator

== Sister cities ==
Lakeland Sister Cities International (LSCI), a chapter of Sister Cities International, was formed in 1990 with Lakeland's first sister city Richmond Hill, Canada.

- Bălți, Moldova (since 1997)
- Chongming County, Shanghai, China (since 2007)
- Imabari, Ehime, Japan (since 1995)
- Portmore, Jamaica (since 2009)
- Richmond Hill, Ontario, Canada (since 1990)

Lakeland also has "regional friendships" (a less formal version of sister cities) with:

- Rîbnița, Moldova
- Jiaxing, China

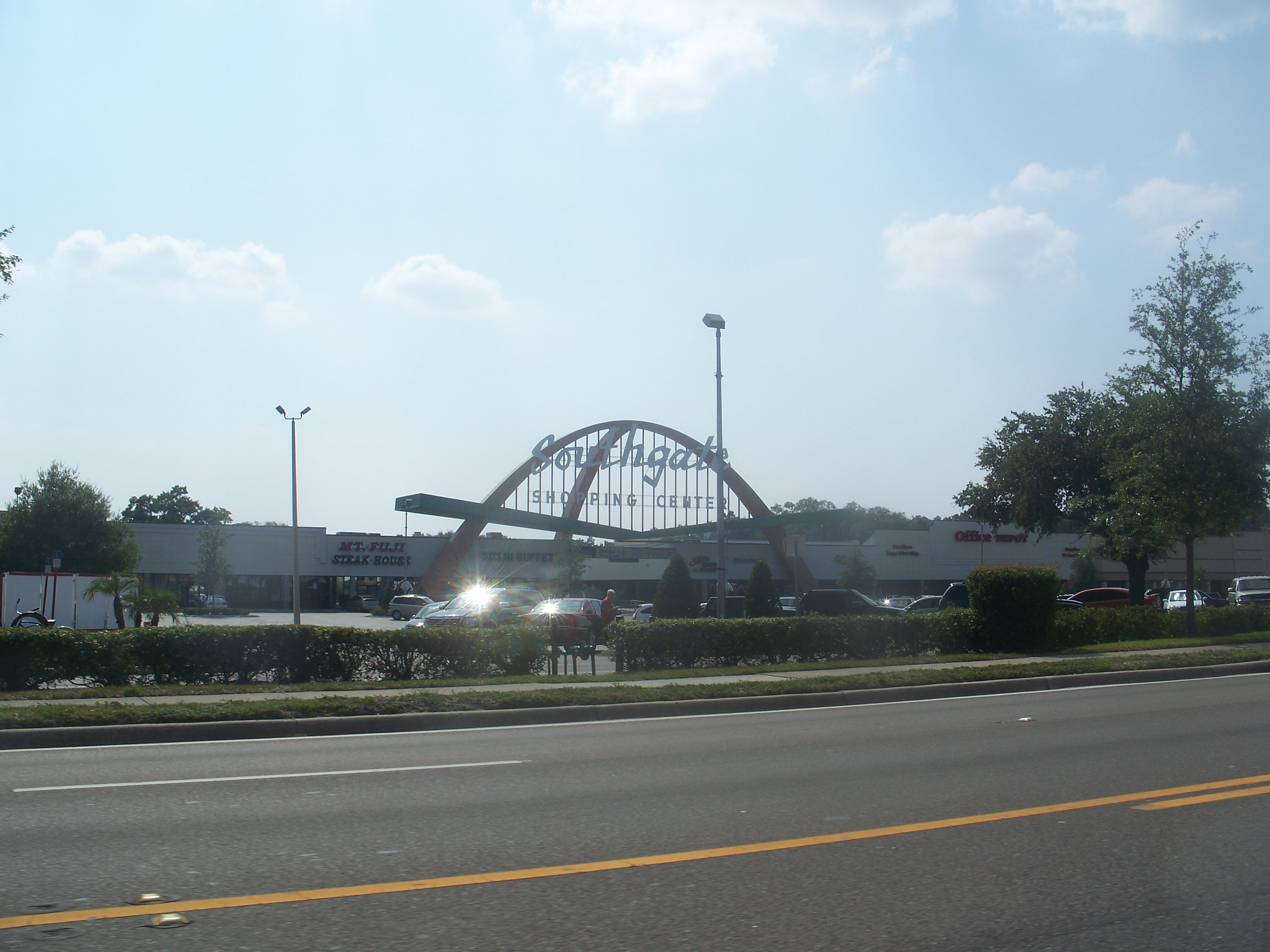
Southgate Shopping Center

== In popular culture ==
In 1990, Lakeland made its Hollywood debut when the Southgate Shopping Center was featured in the movie Edward Scissorhands. It was also used in the filming of the Judd Nelson movie Endure. Classrooms from Florida Southern College were used in the Adam Sandler comedy, The Waterboy. The Lakeland Civic Center was also the filming location for the music video of Little Red Corvette by pop musician Prince. In 2020, the Southgate Shopping Center was featured as the exterior of the "Big Top Mall" in the movie The One and Only Ivan, with other scenes located at the Silver Moon Drive-In and Dobbins Park.

== See also ==
- Loyce Harpe Park

== Bibliography ==
- "Lakeland". Florida Gazetteer and Business Directory 1907–1908. R. L. Polk & Co. 1907.
- "Lakeland". Florida State Gazetteer and Business Directory. R. L. Polk & Co. 1918.
- Lakeland and Polk County Directory. R.L. Polk & Co. 1923.
- Federal Writers' Project (1939). "Lakeland". Florida: a Guide to the Southernmost State. American Guide Series. New York: Oxford University Press. pp. 515–518. ISBN 9781623760090 – via Google Books.
- This Was Yesterday: a History of Lakeland, Florida. Junior Welfare League of Greater Lakeland. 1973.
- Hampton Dunn (1976). Yesterday's Lakeland.
- Lynn M. Homan; Thomas Reilly (2001). Lakeland. Images of America. Charleston, South Carolina: Arcadia. ISBN 9780738513980.
- Paul T. Hellmann (2006). "Florida". Historical Gazetteer of the United States. Taylor & Francis. ISBN 1-135-94859-3.
