= Collegiate School =

Collegiate School may refer to:

== Educational institutions ==
=== Australia ===
- The Collegiate School of St Peter, a private Anglican boys' school in Adelaide, Australia. Commonly known as St Peter's College
- St Michael's Collegiate School, a private Anglican girls' day and boarding primary, intermediate and high school in Hobart, Australia
- St Peter's Collegiate Girls' School, a private Anglican girls' school in Adelaide, Australia. Commonly known as St Peter's Girls' School

=== Bangladesh ===
- Dhaka Collegiate School, a school in Dhaka
- Rajshahi Collegiate School, First and oldest school in Bangladesh
- Chittagong Collegiate School, a School in Chittagong
- Military Collegiate School Khulna, a School in Khulna

=== Jamaica ===
- Collegiate School (Jamaica), a school in Kingston

=== New Zealand ===
- Sir Edmund Hillary Collegiate a public primary, middle and high school in South Auckland, New Zealand
- St Paul's Collegiate School, a private Anglican day and boarding high school in Hamilton, New Zealand
- St Matthew's Collegiate School, a state integrated Anglican girls' day and boarding intermediate and high school in Masterton, New Zealand
- Samuel Marsden Collegiate School, a private Anglican girls' primary, intermediate and high school in Wellington, New Zealand
- Wanganui Collegiate School, a state integrated Anglican coed high school in Whanganui, New Zealand
- St Hilda's Collegiate School, an Anglican state integrated girls' day and boarding intermediate and high school in Dunedin, New Zealand

=== South Africa ===
- Collegiate Girls High School a public high school for girls Gqeberha, Eastern Cape province

=== United Kingdom ===
- Bournemouth Collegiate School, Bournemouth, United Kingdom
- Collegiate School, Bristol, United Kingdom (formerly Colston's and Colston’s Collegiate School)
- Hull Collegiate School, Kingston upon Hull, United Kingdom
- North London Collegiate School, Edgware, London
- Sheffield Collegiate School, Sheffield, United Kingdom

=== United States ===
- The Collegiate School (1701–1718), original name for Yale University
- Collegiate School (New York City), an independent school for boys in New York City
- Collegiate School (New Jersey), a private coeducational day school in Passaic County, New Jersey
- Collegiate School (Richmond, Virginia), a preparatory school in Richmond, Virginia
- Collegiate High School (Lakeland, Florida), a charter high school located on the Lakeland, Florida campus of Polk State College
- Northwest Florida State College, a school in Niceville, Florida
- State College of Florida Collegiate School, a school in Bradenton, Florida

== Other uses ==
- Collegiate institute, an institution of secondary or postsecondary education; used primarily in Canada
