= John F. Cox Grammar School =

- U.S. National Register of Historic Places
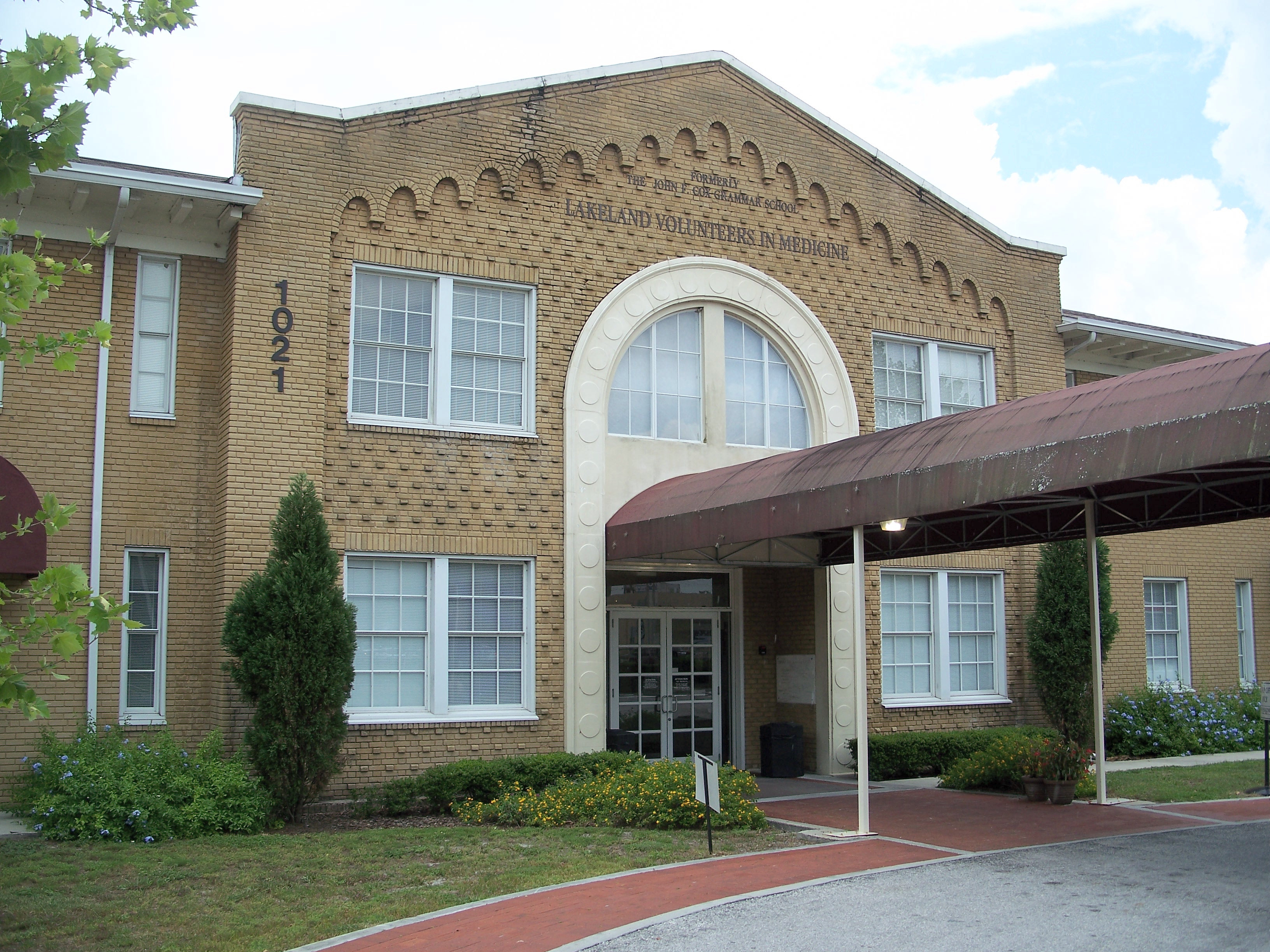

- Location within Florida Location within the United States
- Location: Lakeland, Florida, Polk County, Florida
- Coordinates: 28°03′23″N 81°57′13″W
- Built: 1928
- NRHP reference No.: 99000864
- Added to NRHP: July 22, 1999

The John F. Cox Grammar School (also known as the John F. Cox Elementary School) is a historic school in Lakeland, Florida. It is located at 1005-1021 North Massachusetts Avenue. On July 22, 1999, it was added to the U.S. National Register of Historic Places.

== Notable people ==
- Dan White—American actor in film and television.

== Gallery ==
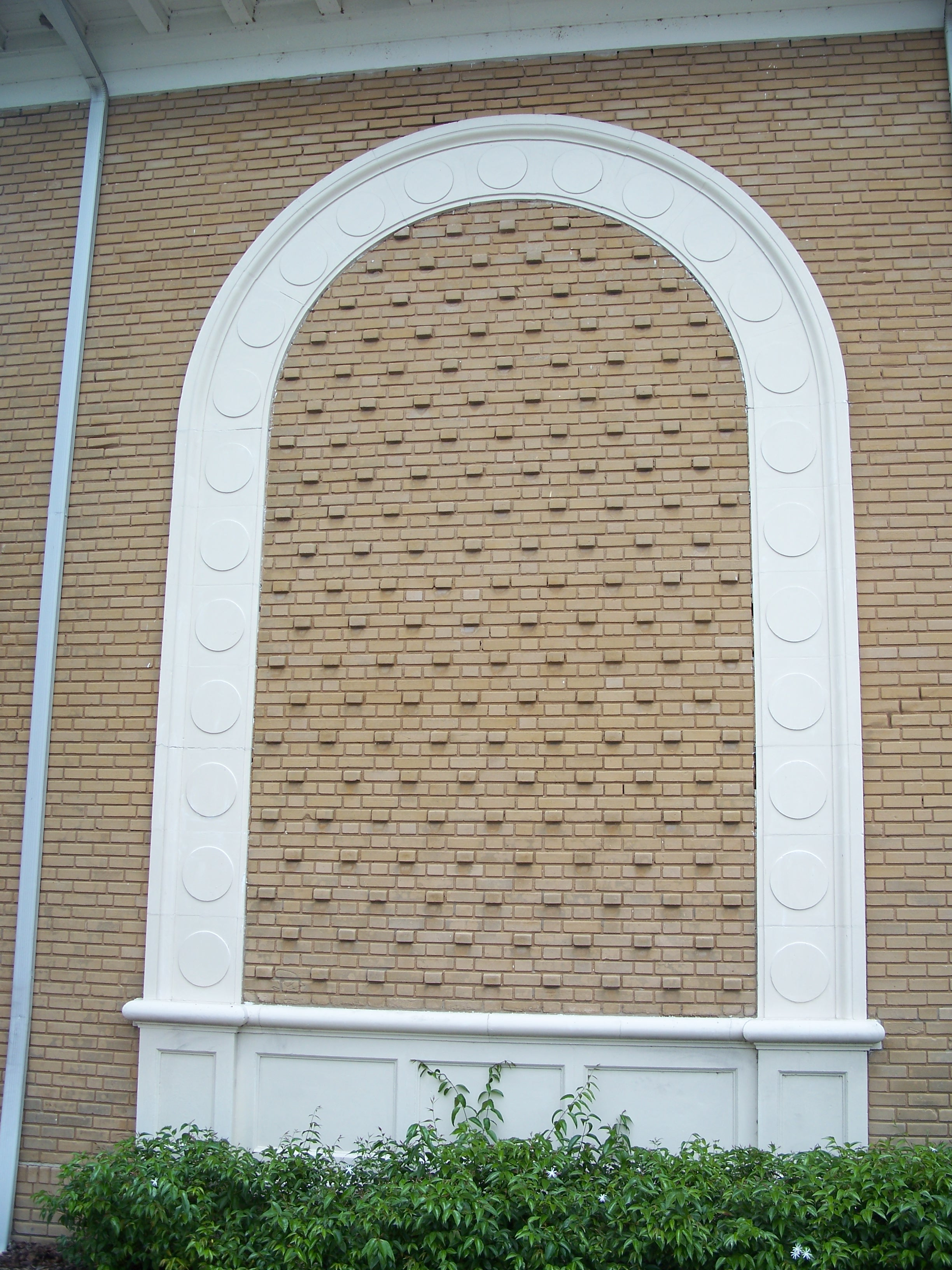

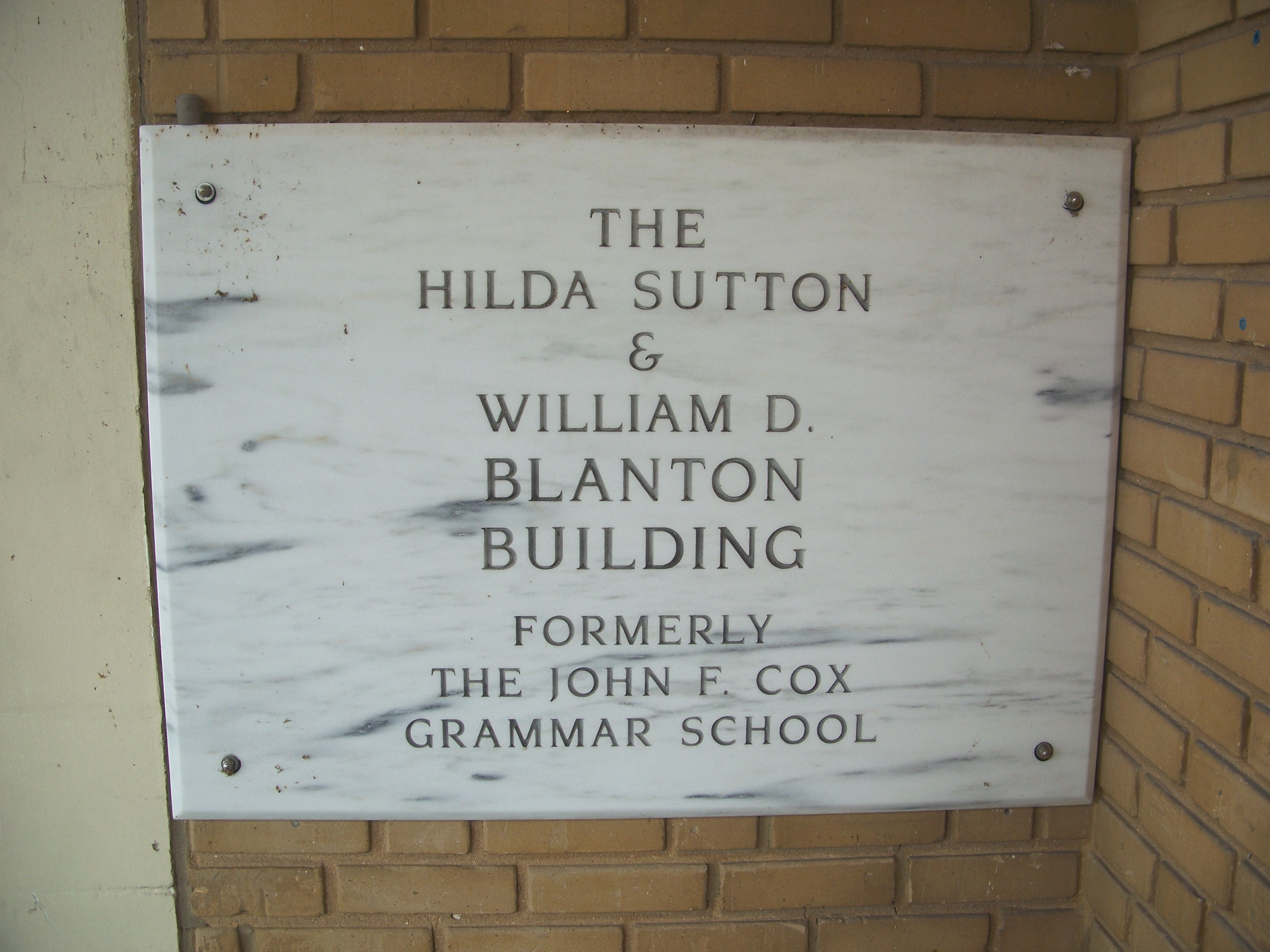

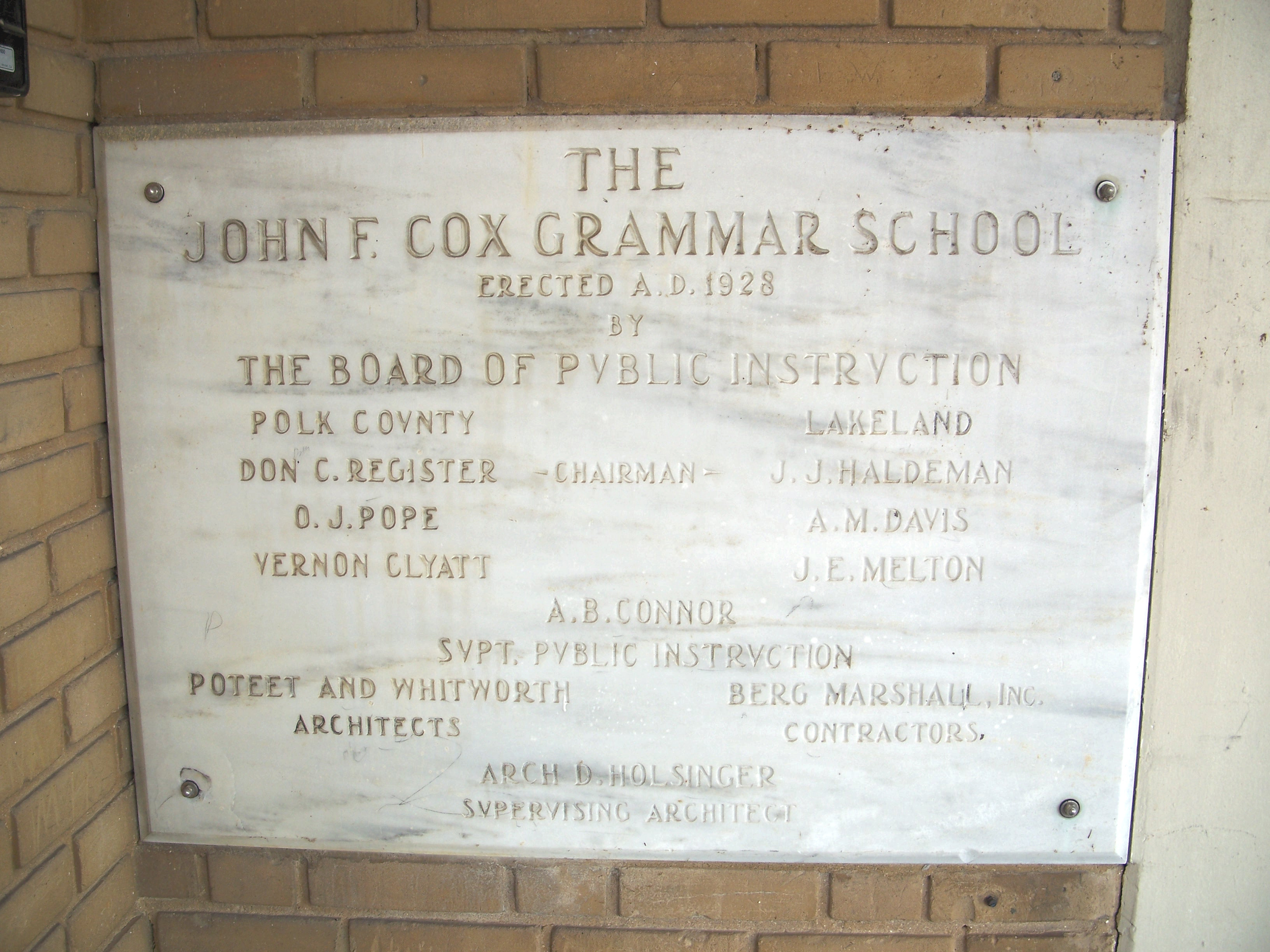
