= Polk Theatre (Lakeland, Florida) =

- The historic Polk Theatre
- Interactive map of Polk Theatre
- Address: 121 S Florida Ave, Lakeland, Florida
- Coordinates: 28.0432°N 81.9572°W
- Owner: Private
- Capacity: 1,400
- Type: Atmospheric
- Current use: Performance Theatre

Construction
- Opened: 1928
- Architect: J.E. Casale

Website
- http://www.polktheatre.org
- Polk Theatre and Office Building
- U.S. National Register of Historic Places
- Location within Florida Location within the United States
- Location: 121 S. Florida Ave., Lakeland, Florida
- Coordinates: 28°2′35″N 81°57′28″W
- Built: 1927
- Architect: James E. Casale, George A. Miller
- Architectural style: Italian Renaissance
- NRHP reference No.: 93000446
- Added to NRHP: May 27, 1993

The Polk Theatre in Lakeland, Florida is a historic theater located at 121 South Florida Avenue.

The 1,400-seat theatre was built in 1928 after the local business "boom" of the town had ended and despite the fact that the population was only 15,000 inhabitants. In 1982, a group of concerned people banded together to save the theatre from being razed due to low attendance. Local citizens formed a non-profit group, borrowed money, secured a grant from the state, and purchased the theatre for $300,000. The theatre has a mezzanine, a high balcony, a permanent backdrop of a "Venetian piazza," an orchestra pit, a ceiling against which images of twinkling stars are projected, and terrazzo flooring. The air-conditioning system, which was the first in the county, was a pump that used artesian well water to chill the building.

Under the name Polk Theatre and Office Building, the building was added to the U.S. National Register of Historic Places in 1993.

== Image gallery ==
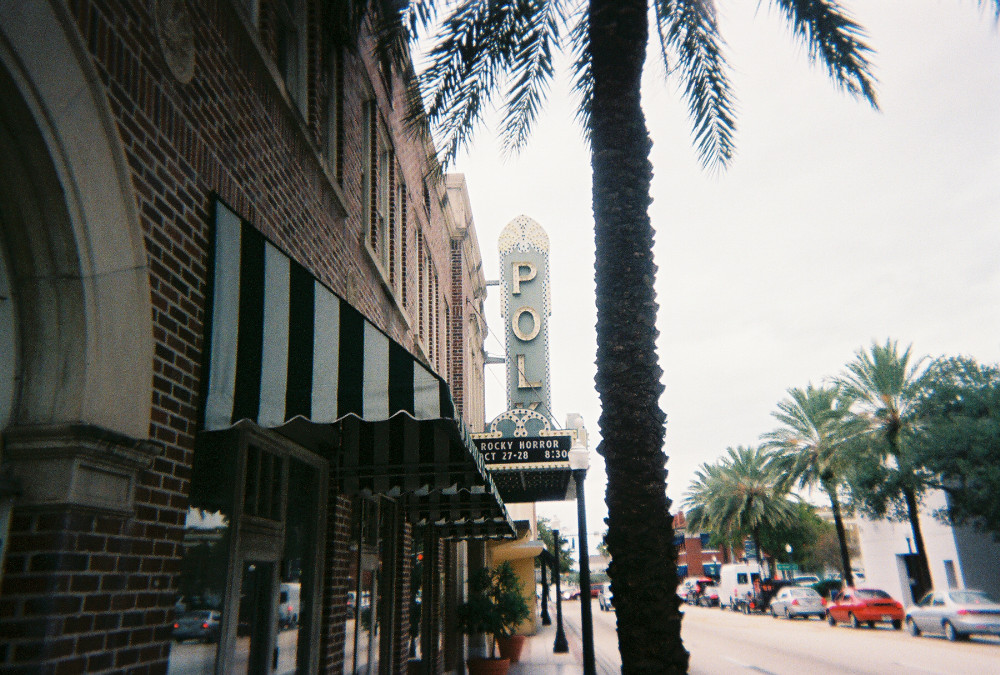
Polk Theatre as viewed from the sidewalk, October 2006.

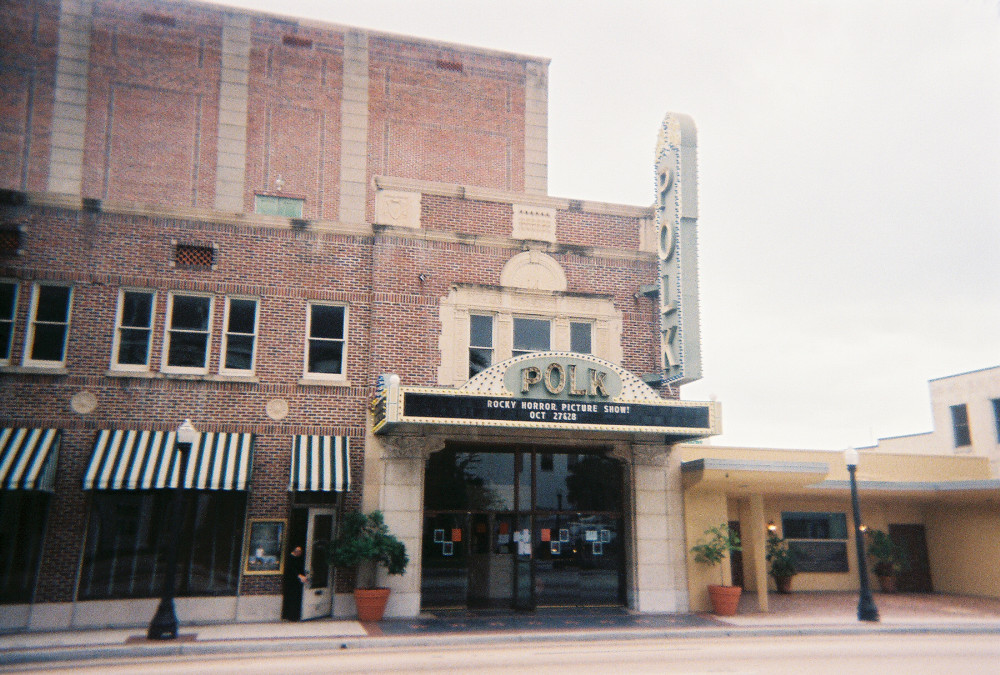
Polk Theatre as viewed from the street, October 2006 (landscape).

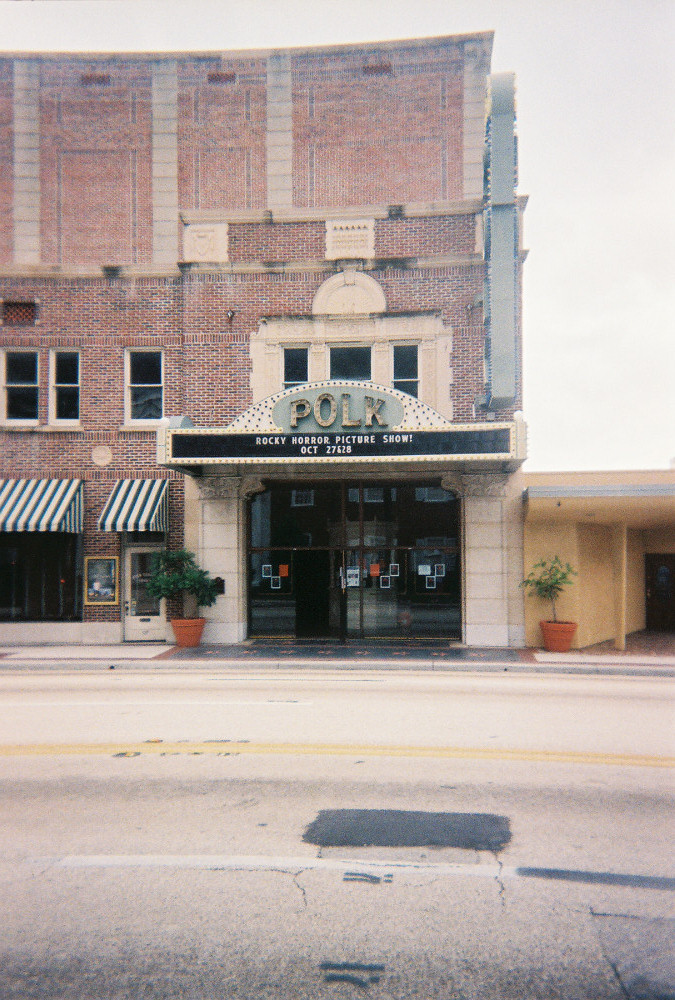
Polk Theatre as viewed from the street, October 2006 (portrait).

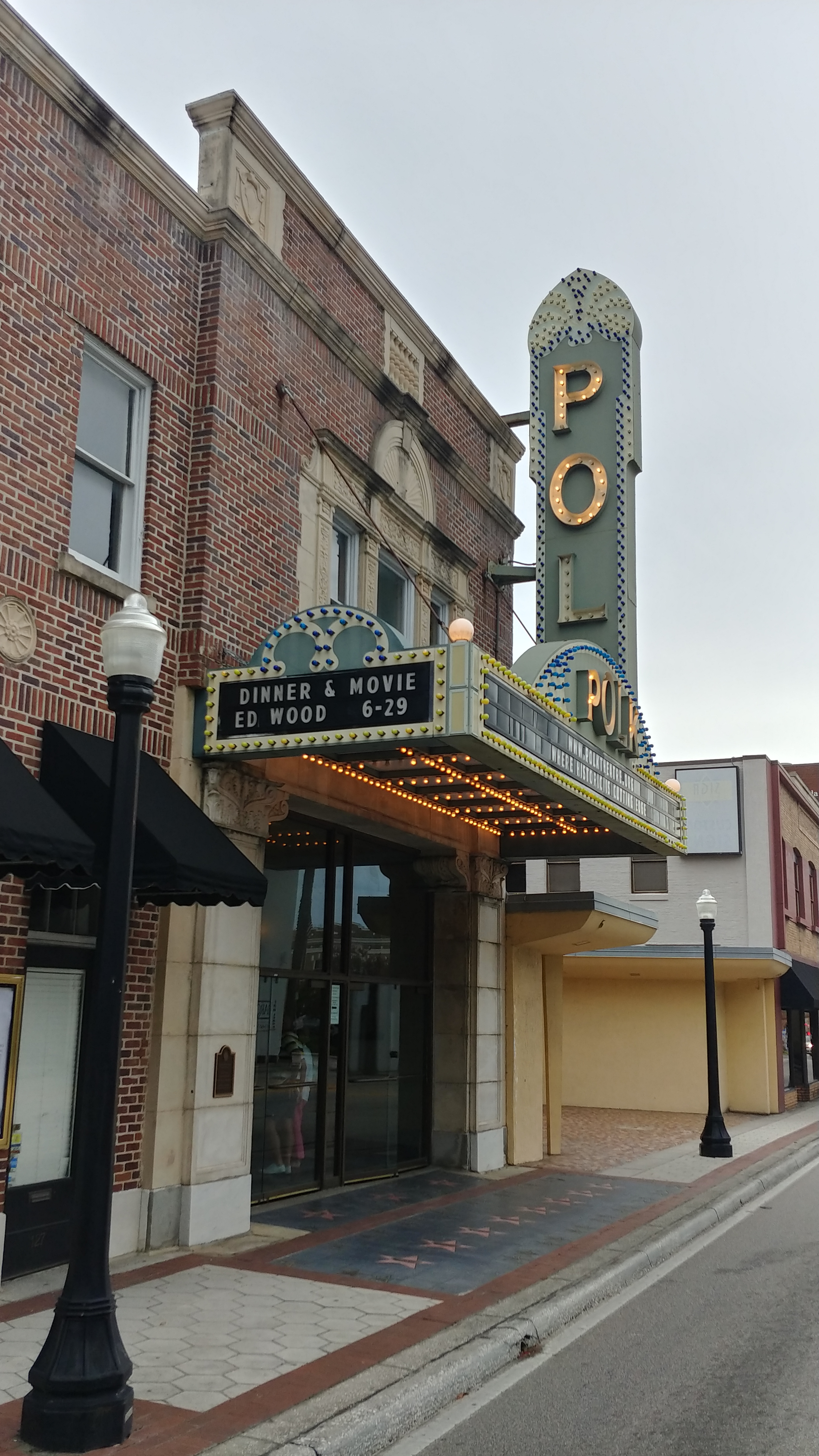
Polk Theatre as viewed from the street, June 2019.

== See also ==
- Movie palaces list
