= Silvermoon Drive-in =

Drive-in theatre in Lakeland, Florida

Coordinates: 28.0350°N 82.0154°W

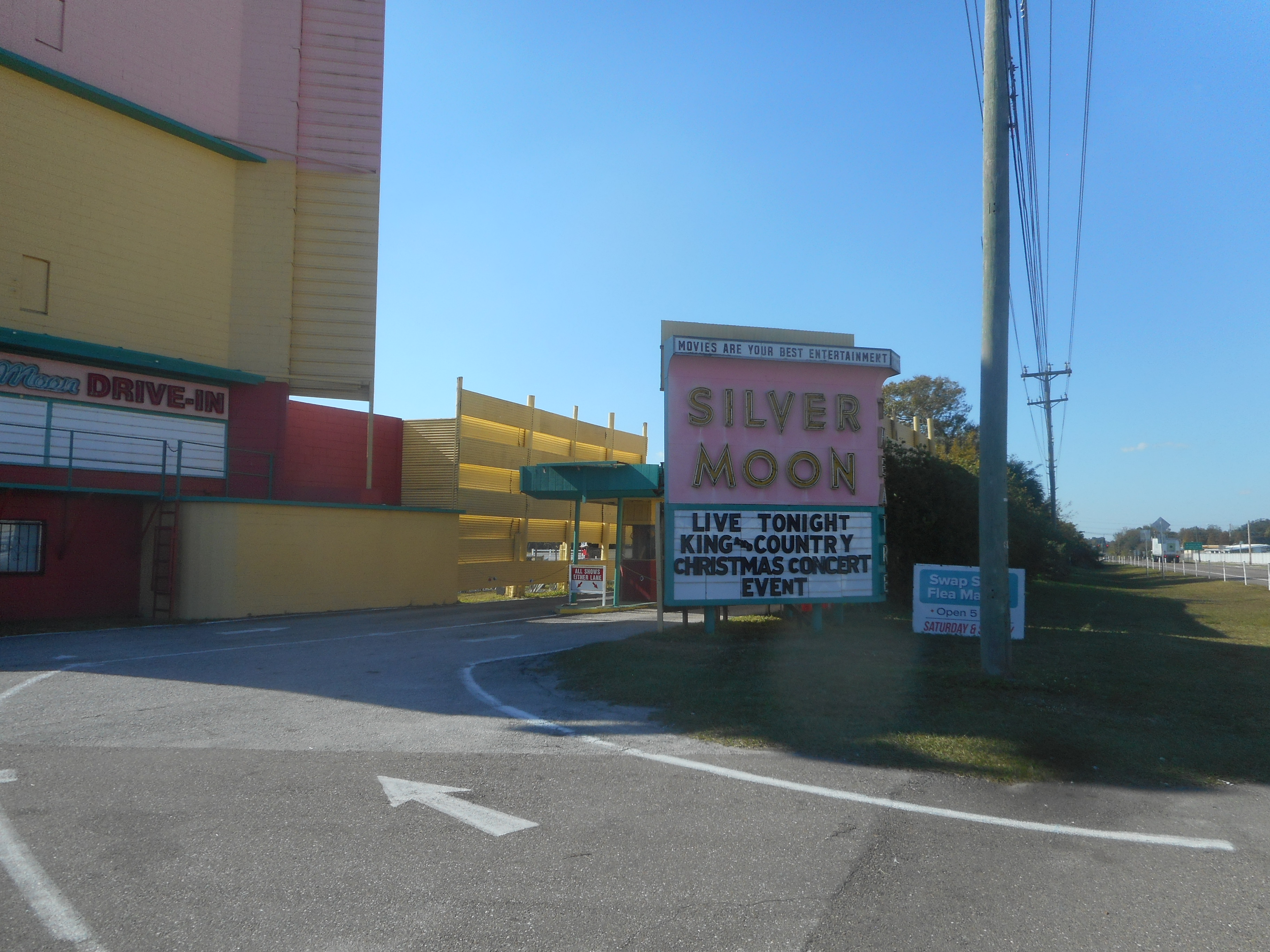
Silvermoon Drive-In as seen from Silver Moon Drive off of US 92; December 2020

The Silvermoon Drive-In is a drive-in theatre in Lakeland, Florida. Established in 1948, it is the last remaining drive-in of Polk County, Florida.

== History ==
The Silvermoon was founded on April 14, 1948. Admission was only 35 cents per person. The opening attraction was Up Goes Maisie, starring Ann Sothern and George Murphy. The Theatre was owned and operated by I. Q. Mize and M. G. Waring.

On May 23, 1950 the screen was damaged in a tornado, but the theatre was reopened on July 1, 1950. In 1952 I. Q. Mize and M. G. Waring sold the theatre to Carl Floyd owner of Floyd Theaters, a successful chain of theatres across Florida.

Floyd Enterprises was acquired by Burnup & Sims in the late 1970s, but they retained Harold Spears, who Carl Floyd had appointed the president of Floyd Theatres. In 1985 another screen was added.

In the 1990s Burnup & Sims merged with Mastec. When in 1996 Mastec told Mr. Spears to close the remaining drive-in theatres, he formed Sun South Theatres and bought the Silvermoon Drive-in and two other drive-in theaters. One of those theaters, the 28th Street Drive-In in St. Pete was closed down in 2000. The other theater, the Joy-Lan Drive-In in Dade City is still operating. The cinema celebrated its 50th anniversary with a gala in 1998. In 2022, both of the Silver Moon's screens were upgraded to laser projection systems.

== See also ==
- List of drive-in theaters
