= Beacon Hill-Alta Vista Residential District =

Historic district in Florida, United States

- U.S. National Register of Historic Places
- U.S. Historic district
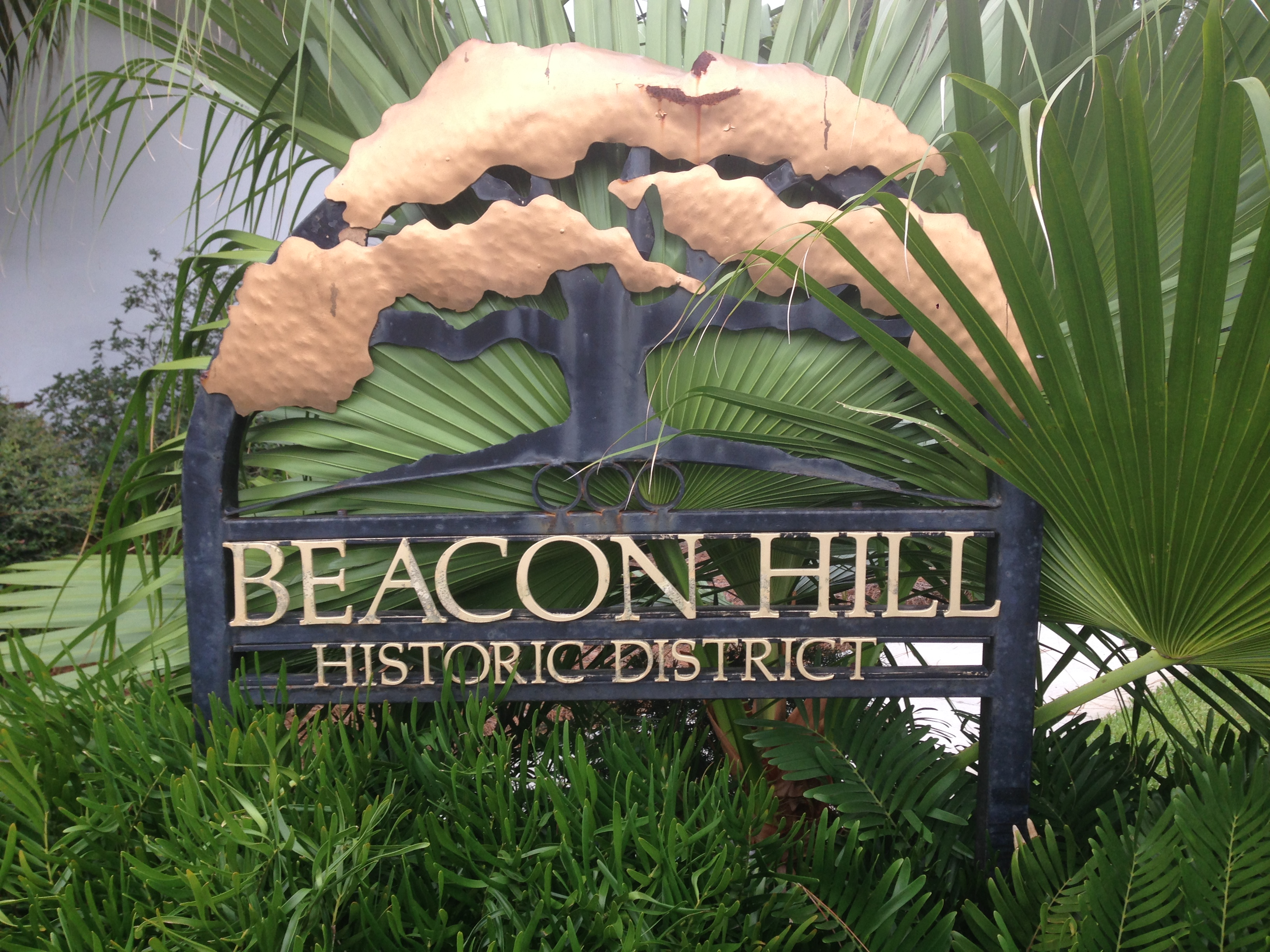

- Location within Florida Location within the United States
- Location: Lakeland, Florida
- Coordinates: 28°1′18″N 81°57′35″W
- Area: 400 acres (1.6 km^{2})
- Architectural style: Bungalow/Craftsman, Colonial Revival, Frame Vernacular
- NRHP reference No.: 93000130
- Added to NRHP: March 4, 1993

The Beacon Hill-Alta Vista Residential District is a U.S. historic district (designated as such on March 4, 1993) located in Lakeland, Florida. The district is bounded by South Florida Avenue, West Beacon Road, West Belvedere Street and Cherokee Trail. It contains 77 historic buildings.
