= Collegiate High School (Lakeland, Florida) =

School in Lakeland, Florida, US

Location
- Lakeland, Polk, FL
- 27°59′25″N 81°53′22″W

Information
- School type: Charter (U.S.)
- Established: 2004; 22 years ago
- Director: Sallie Brisbane
- Teaching staff: 3.00 (FTE)
- Grades: 11–12
- Enrollment: 353 (2022-2023)
- Student to teacher ratio: 117.67
- Mascot: Eagles(PSC)
- Website: https://www.polk.edu/polk-state-lakeland-collegiate-high-school/

Collegiate High School is a charter high school located on the Lakeland, Florida campus of Polk State College.

The program is unique in that it is located in a college campus and offers high school juniors and seniors the opportunity to earn their associate degree or MCSE/CNE certification (for IT students) at the same time as their high school diploma, with course registration and textbooks provided completely free of charge.

== Admittance ==
Admittance to CHS is based on a lottery of sorts. Potential candidates for the program are screened toward the end of their sophomore year to verify that they have an unweighted 3.2 GPA for the AA or a 2.5 GPA for either the IT or Allied Health programs. They must also have a minimum of eleven high school credits and be on track for graduation. Then, they are mailed an invitation to an information session and are given registration packets. There is then a random drawing from the registered students to choose the ones who will attend the following school year.
