= Bok Tower Gardens =

Garden and bird sanctuary in Polk County, Florida, US

- Bok Mountain Lake Sanctuary and Singing Tower
- U.S. National Register of Historic Places
- U.S. National Historic Landmark
- Bok Tower Gardens
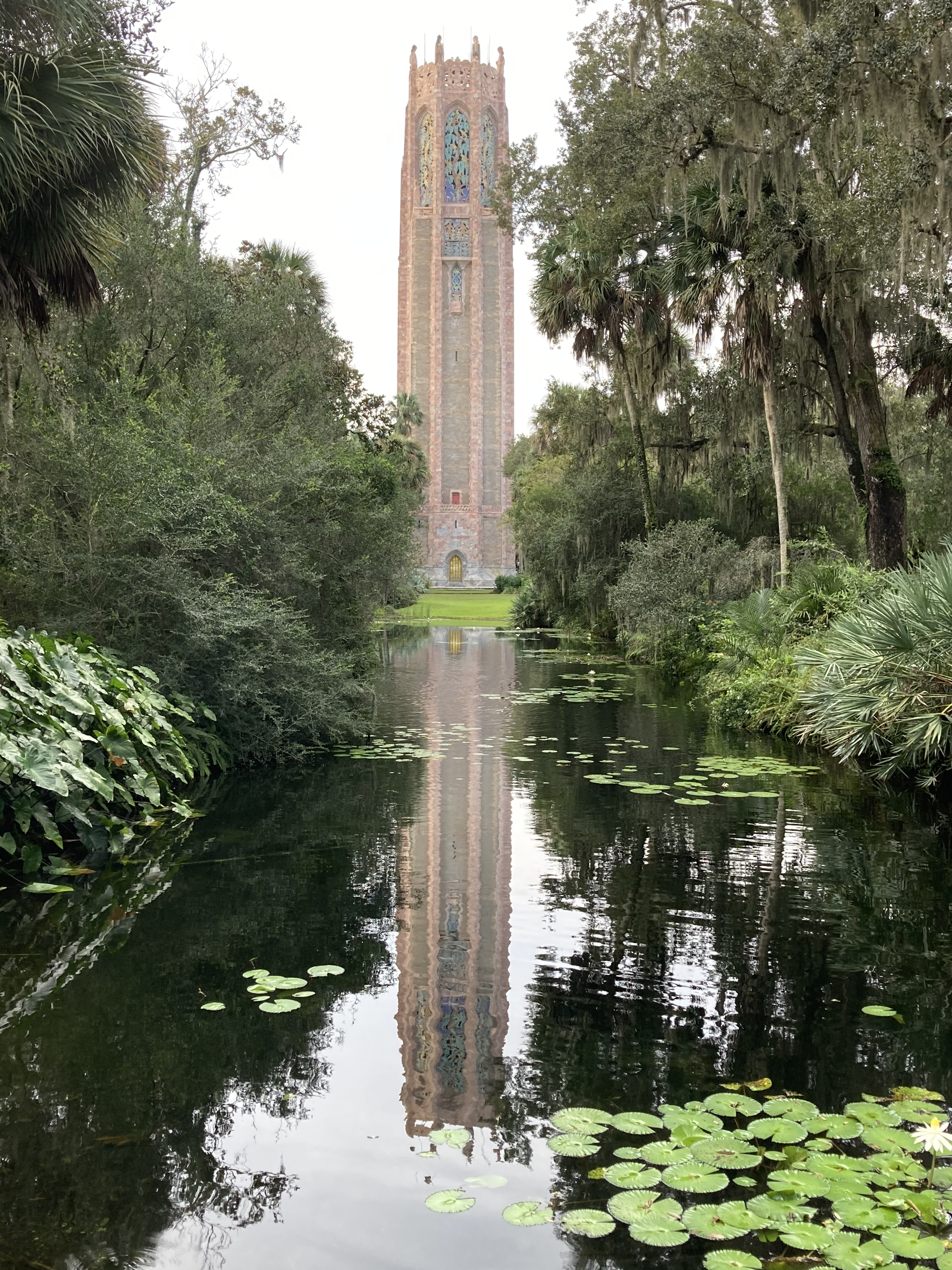
- North facade of Singing Tower

- Location within Florida Location within the United States
- Interactive map showing the location of Bok Tower Gardens
- Location: Iron Mountain
- Nearest city: Lake Wales, Florida, United States
- Coordinates: 27°56′07.2″N 81°34′39″W
- Built: 1924–1928 (gardens); 1927–1929 (tower)
- Architect: Frederick Law Olmsted Jr. (gardens); Milton B. Medary (tower)
- Architectural style: Gothic Revival, with Art Deco detailing
- Website: Official website
- NRHP reference No.: 72000350

Significant dates
- Added to NRHP: 21 August 1972
- Designated NHL: April 19, 1993

Bok Tower Gardens is a 250-acre (100 ha) contemplative garden and bird sanctuary located atop Iron Mountain, north of Lake Wales, Florida, United States, created by Edward Bok in the 1920s. Formerly known as the Bok Mountain Lake Sanctuary and Singing Tower, the gardens' attractions include the Singing Tower and its 60-bell carillon, the Bok Exedra, the Pinewood Estate now known as El Retiro, the Pine Ridge Trail, and the Visitor Center.

Bok Tower Gardens is a National Historic Landmark. The 205-foot (62 m) Singing Tower was built upon one of the highest points of peninsular Florida, estimated to be 295 feet (90 m) above sea level, and is listed on the National Register of Historic Places. The national significance of the gardens and its tower come from their associations with Edward W. Bok and his team of designers. The adjacent Pinewood Estate is separately listed on the National Register as El Retiro.

Bok Tower Gardens is open daily and an admission fee is charged.

== Gardens ==
Edward William Bok, editor of the magazine The Ladies Home Journal, and his wife, Mary Louise Curtis Bok, spent the winter of 1921 in Florida, near Lake Wales Ridge after his retirement. The Boks loved the beauty of the area, and created a 25-acre (10 ha) bird sanctuary on the ridge's highest hill to protect the land from being developed. They commissioned landscape architect Frederick Law Olmsted Jr. to transform what then was an arid sandhill into "a spot of beauty second to none in the country".

The first year was spent digging trenches and laying pipes for irrigation, after which soil was brought to the site by thousands of truck loads and plantings began. Olmsted's plan included the planting of 1,000 large live oaks, 10,000 azaleas, 100 sabal palms, 300 magnolias, and 500 gordonias, as well as hundreds of fruit shrubs such as blueberry and holly. Attempts were made to introduce flamingos to the sanctuary several times, which is why early renderings of the tower show flamingos at the reflection pool rather than swans. Some of the flamingos did not survive winters that were cooler than those of southern Florida and others were killed by animals. The nightingales brought from England did not do well due to the relative cold of central Florida.

The gardens are currently ten times their original size, and feature acres of ferns, palms, oaks, pines, and wetland plants. The plantings also include camellias, tree ferns, creeping fig, yaupon and dahoon holly, Asiatic jasmine, Justicia, crinum and spider lily, monstera, wax myrtle, date and sabal palm, papyrus, philodendron, blue plumbago, and horsetail rush. The site is a refuge for more than a hundred bird species. Wild turkey and groups of sandhill cranes are also often seen wandering the grounds.

In 2016, following a master planning and design effort led by landscape architecture firm Nelson Byrd Woltz, the Bok Tower Gardens unveiled eight acres of new gardens and improved accessibility to the historic tower and 50 acres of historic gardens.

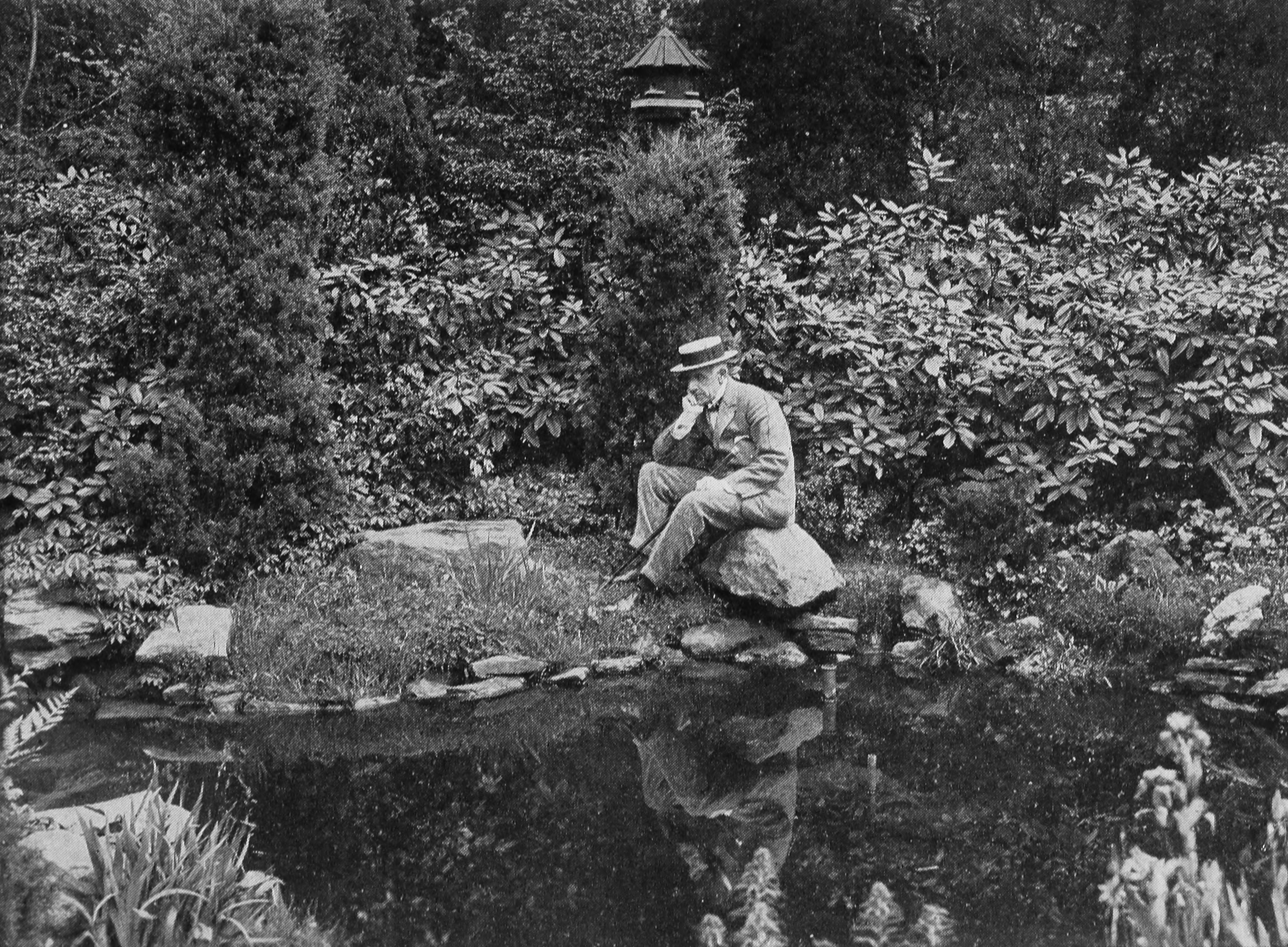
"Where Edward Bok is happiest: in his garden."

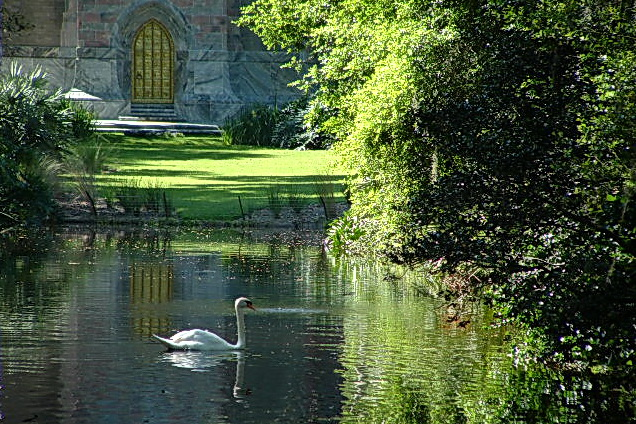
Reflecting pool

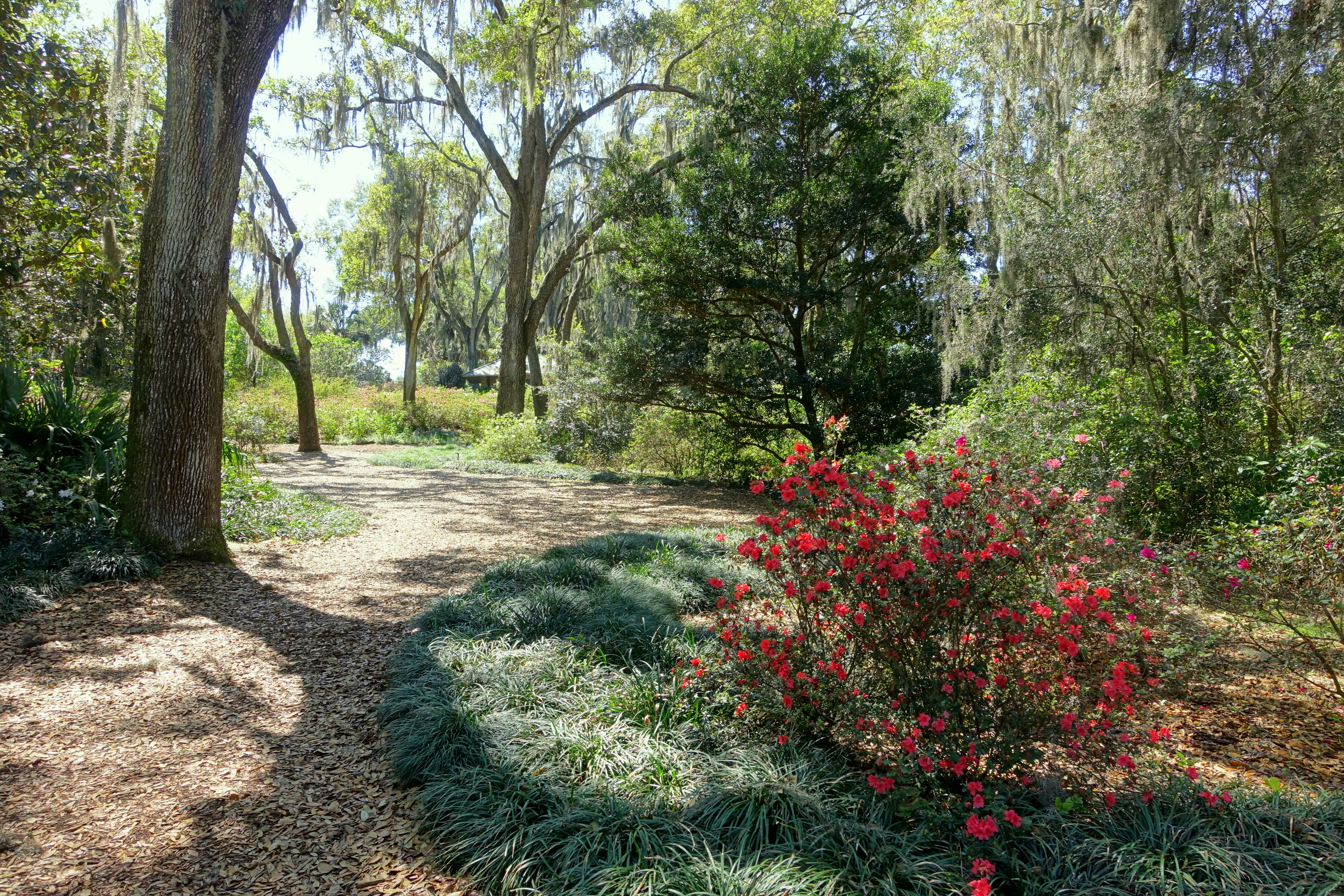
Azaleas in bloom

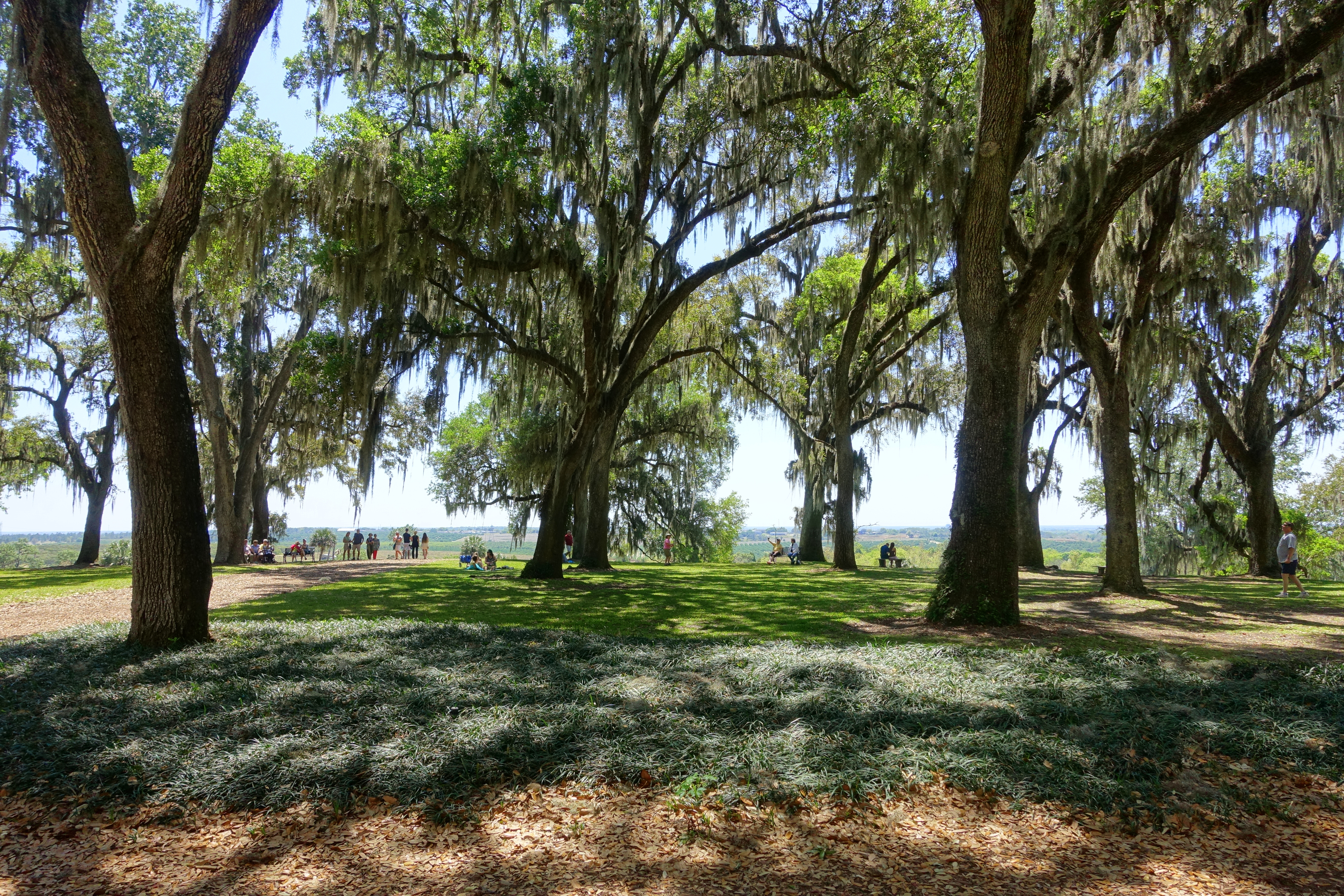
Atop the ridge

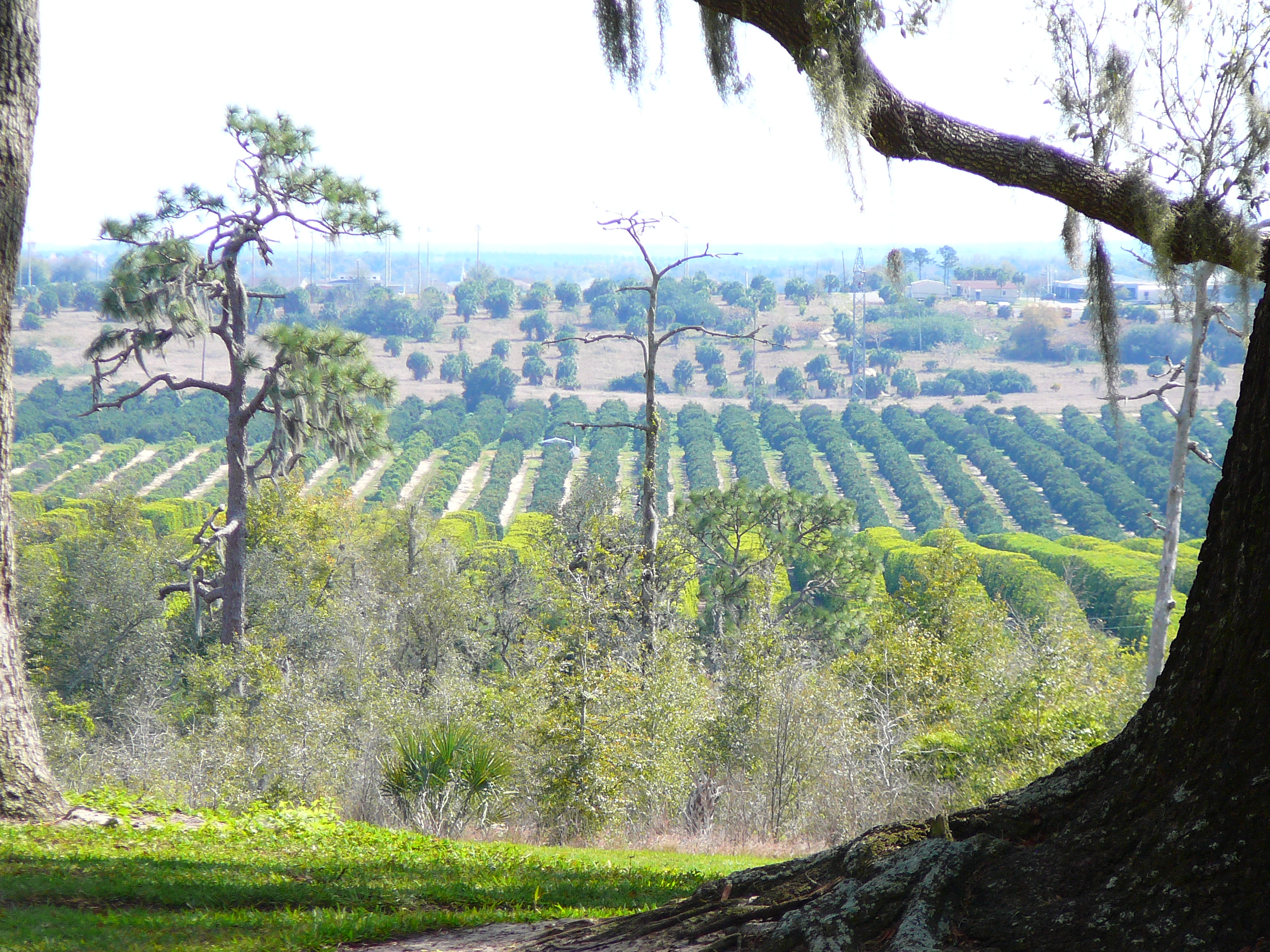
Orange groves below the ridge

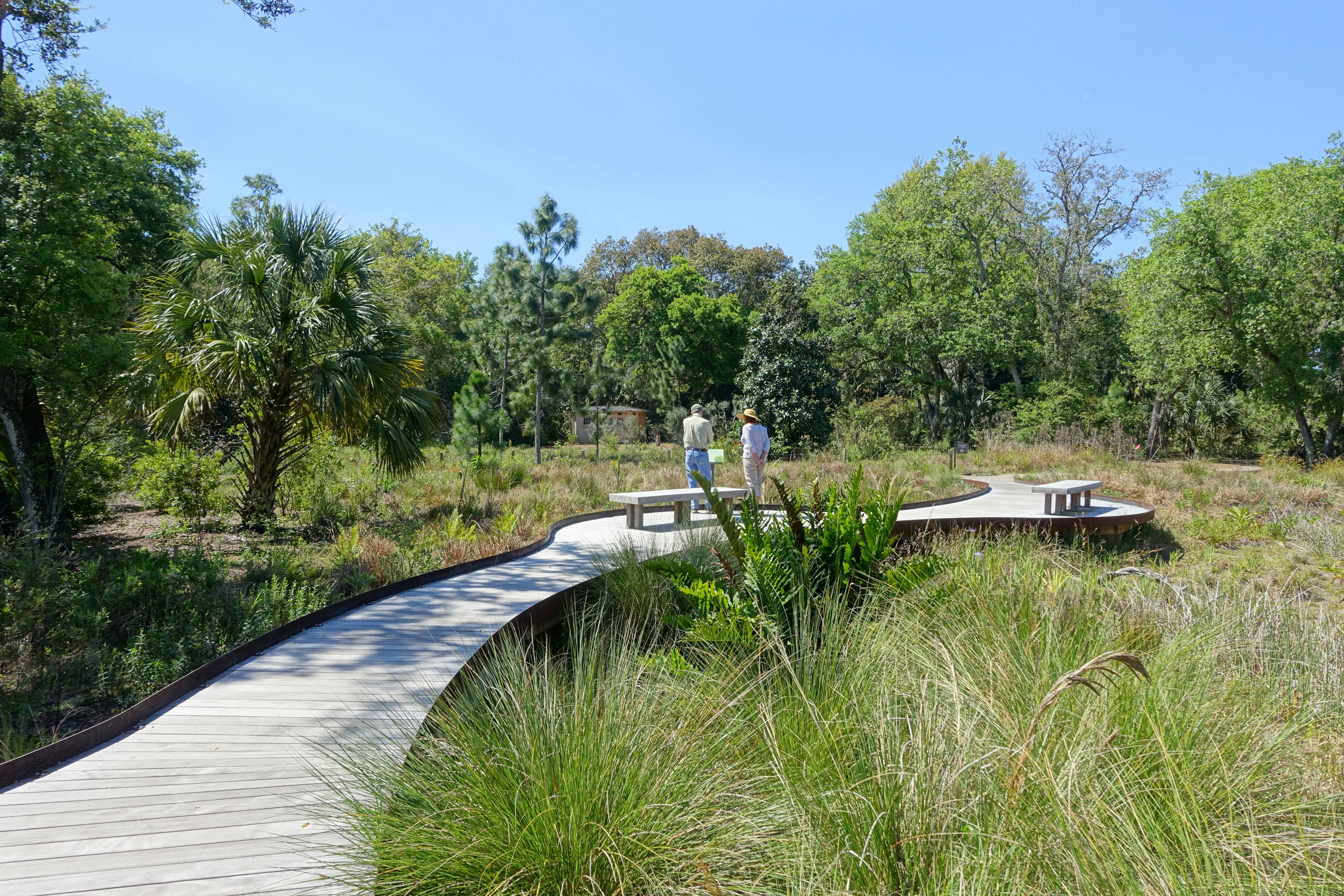
Wetlands boardwalk

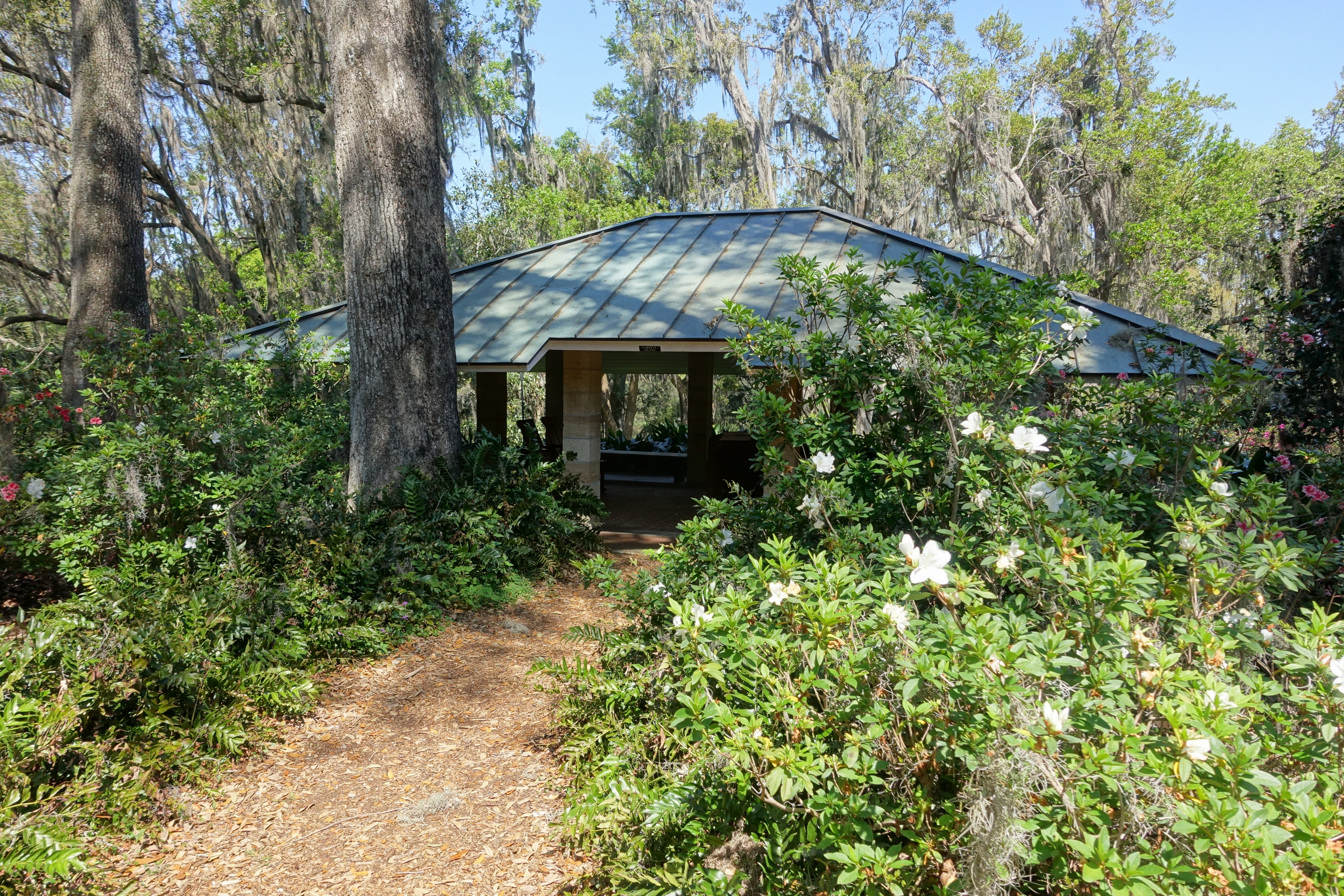
Rain shelter

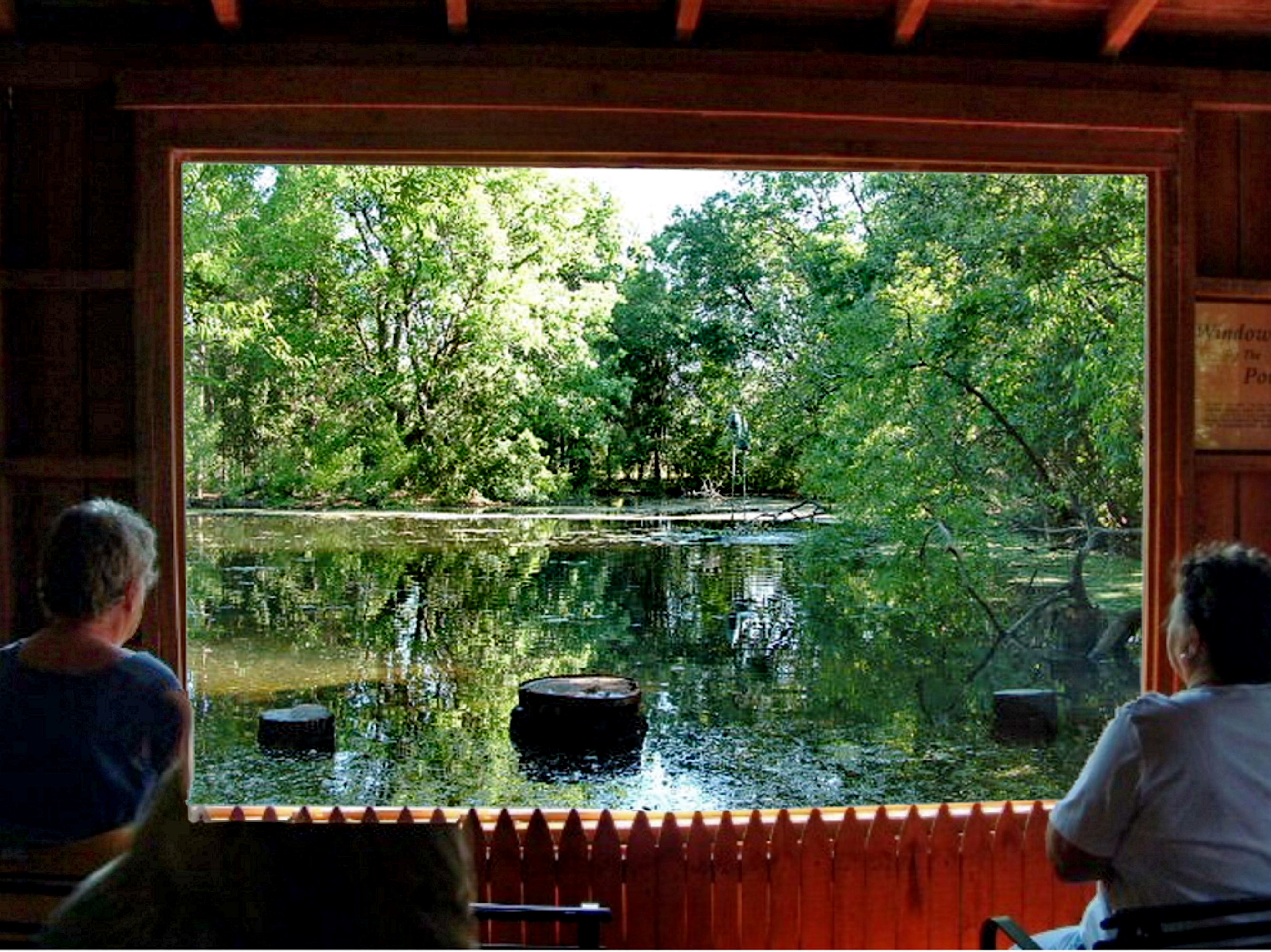
Window by the Pond

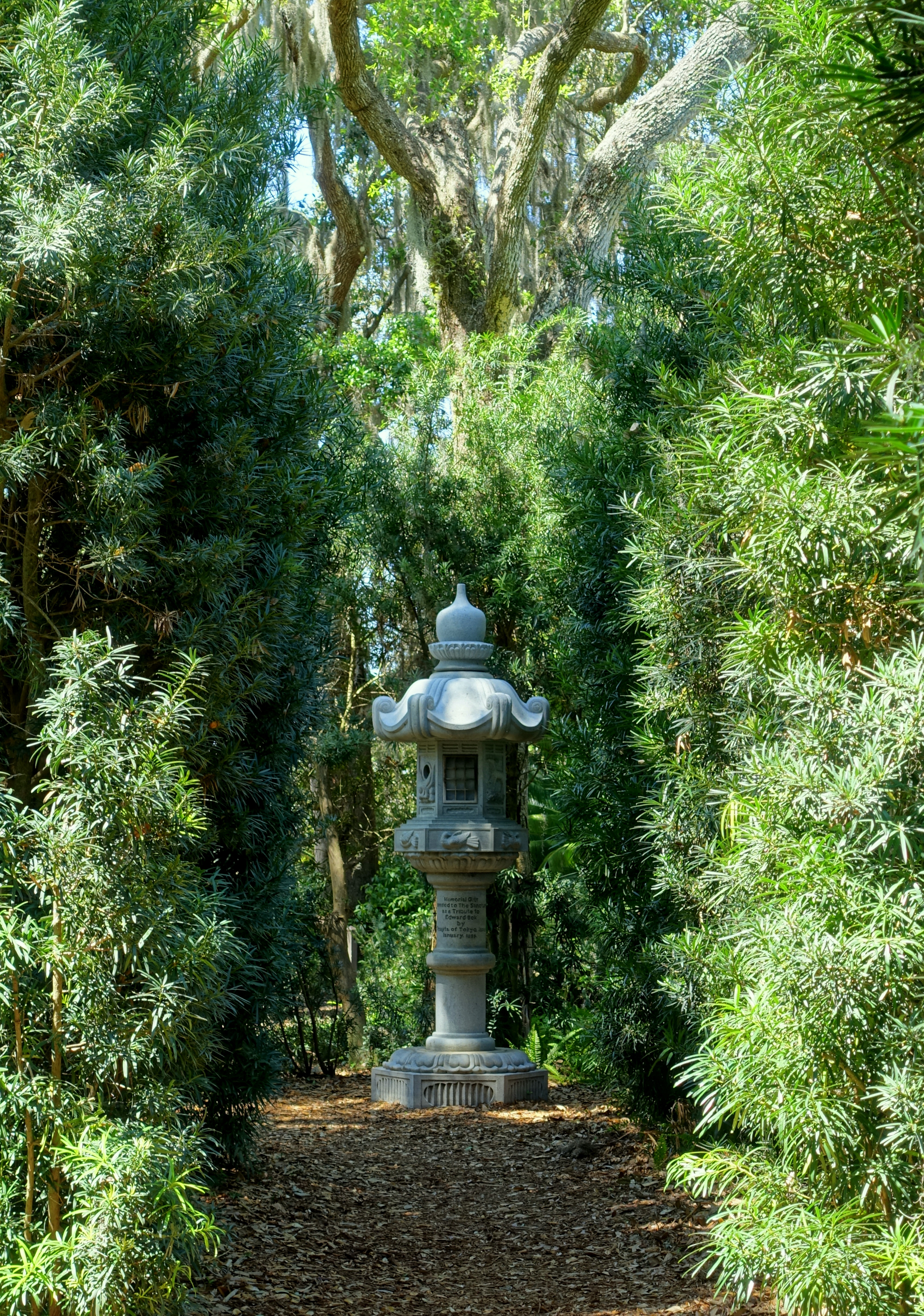
Peace Lantern

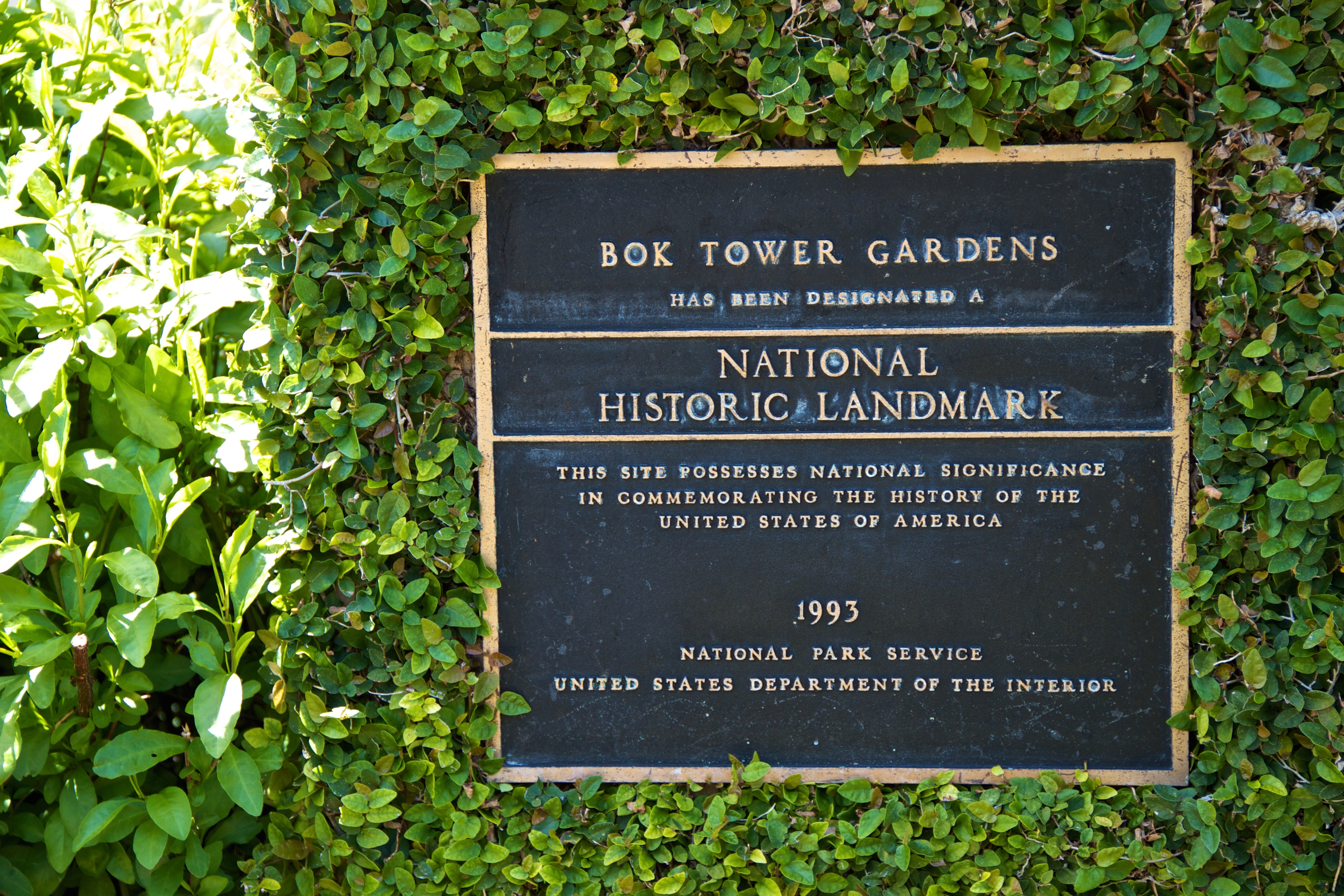
National Historic Landmark plaque

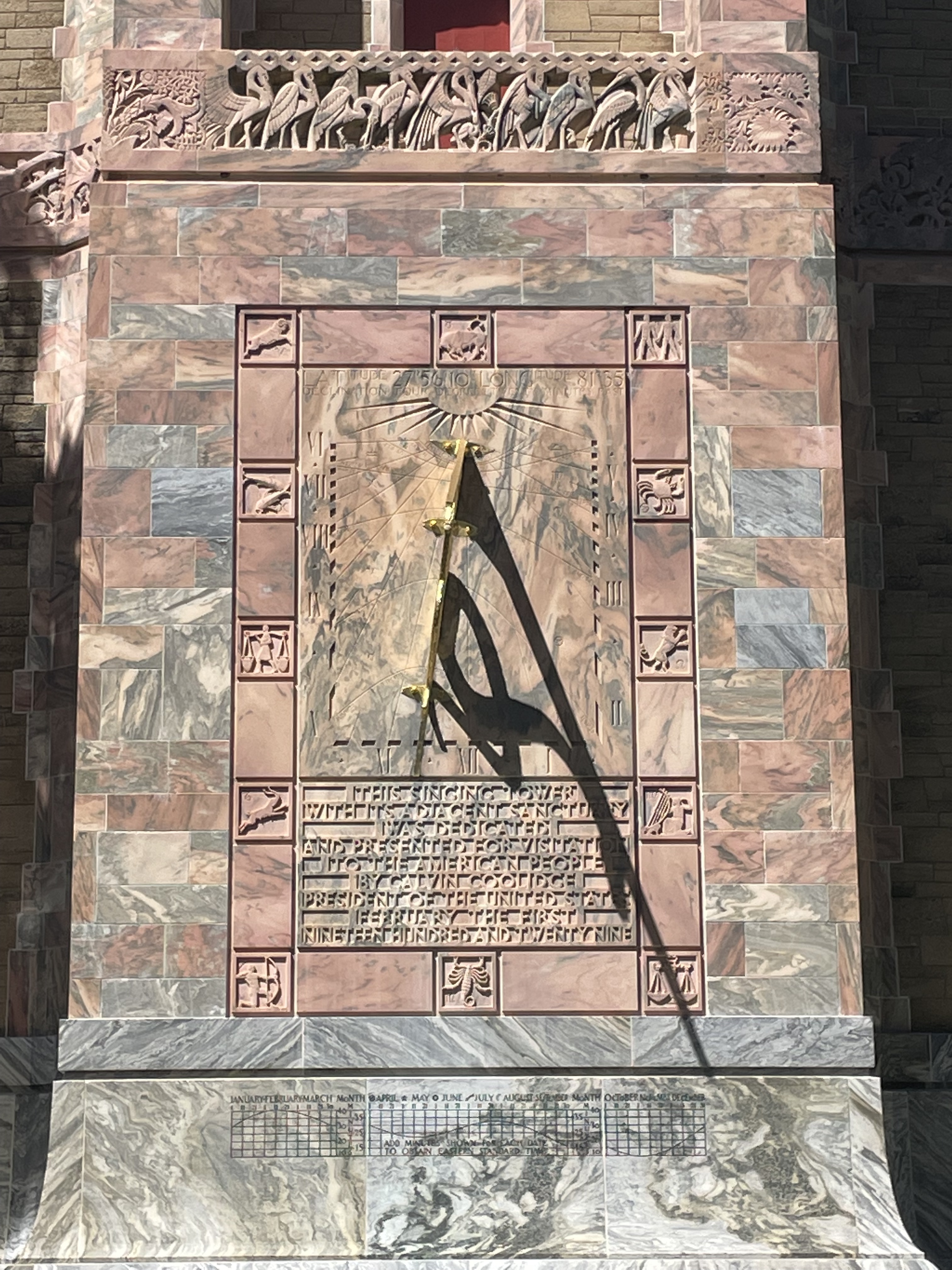
The dedication reads: THIS SINGING TOWER WITH ITS ADJACENT SANCTUARY WAS DEDICATED AND PRESENTED FOR VISITATION TO THE AMERICAN PEOPLE BY CALVIN COOLIDGE PRESIDENT OF THE UNITED STATES FEBRUARY THE FIRST NINETEEN HUNDRED AND TWENTY NINE

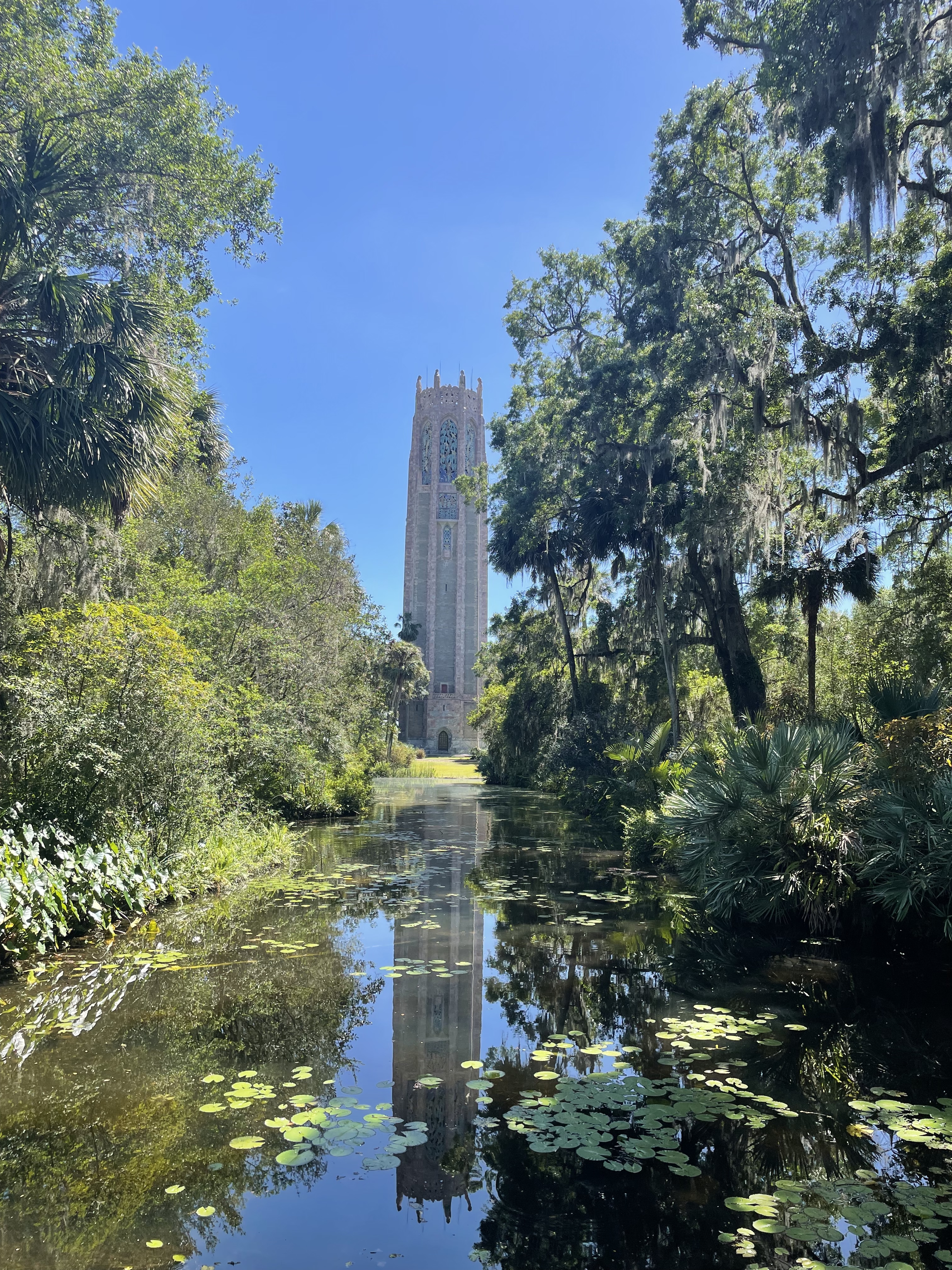
Bok Tower, as seen from across the Reflecting Pool. The tower is 205 feet tall and houses the 60-bell carillon within.

== Singing Tower ==
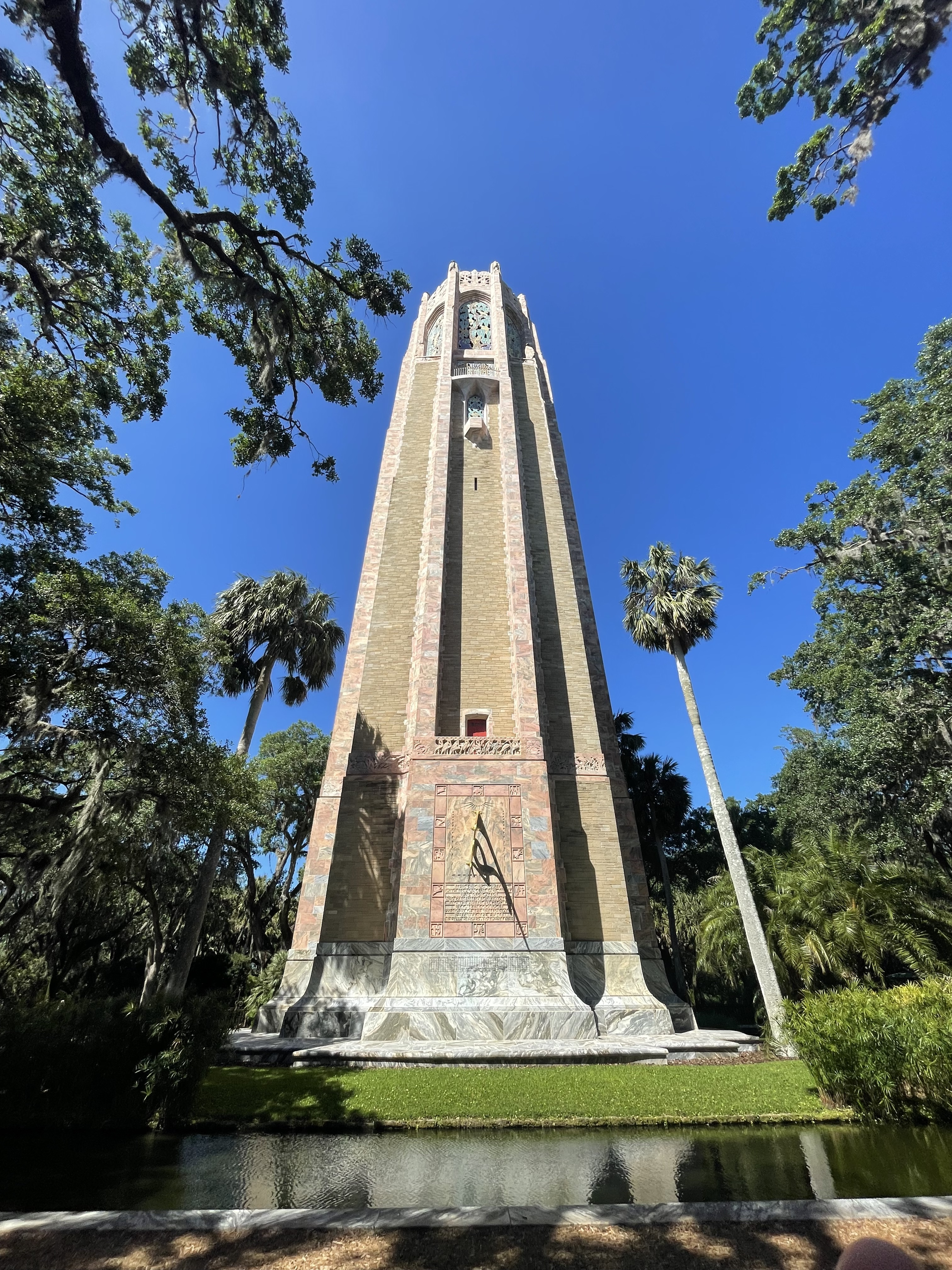
Bok Tower, or the Singing Tower, viewed from behind. Note the pink marble and coquina.

By 1925, Bok had decided to replace the bird sanctuary's water tower with a stone water-and-bell tower. He hired architect Milton B. Medary to design "the most beautiful tower in the world". The 60-bell carillon occupies only the top of the Singing Tower, some of the rest contained large water tanks to irrigate the gardens, with Bok's baronial study at the base. The 15-foot (4.6 m)-wide moat surrounding the tower's base now serves as a koi pond.

The Gothic Revival tower was built at the highest elevation of the site, south of a reflecting pool that reflects its full image. The tower is 51 feet (16 m) square at its base, changing at the height of 150 feet (46 m) to an octagon, with each of the eight sides 37 feet (11 m) wide. It is built of pink Etowah marble and gray Creole marble, mined in Tate, Georgia, and coquina stone from St. Augustine, Florida.

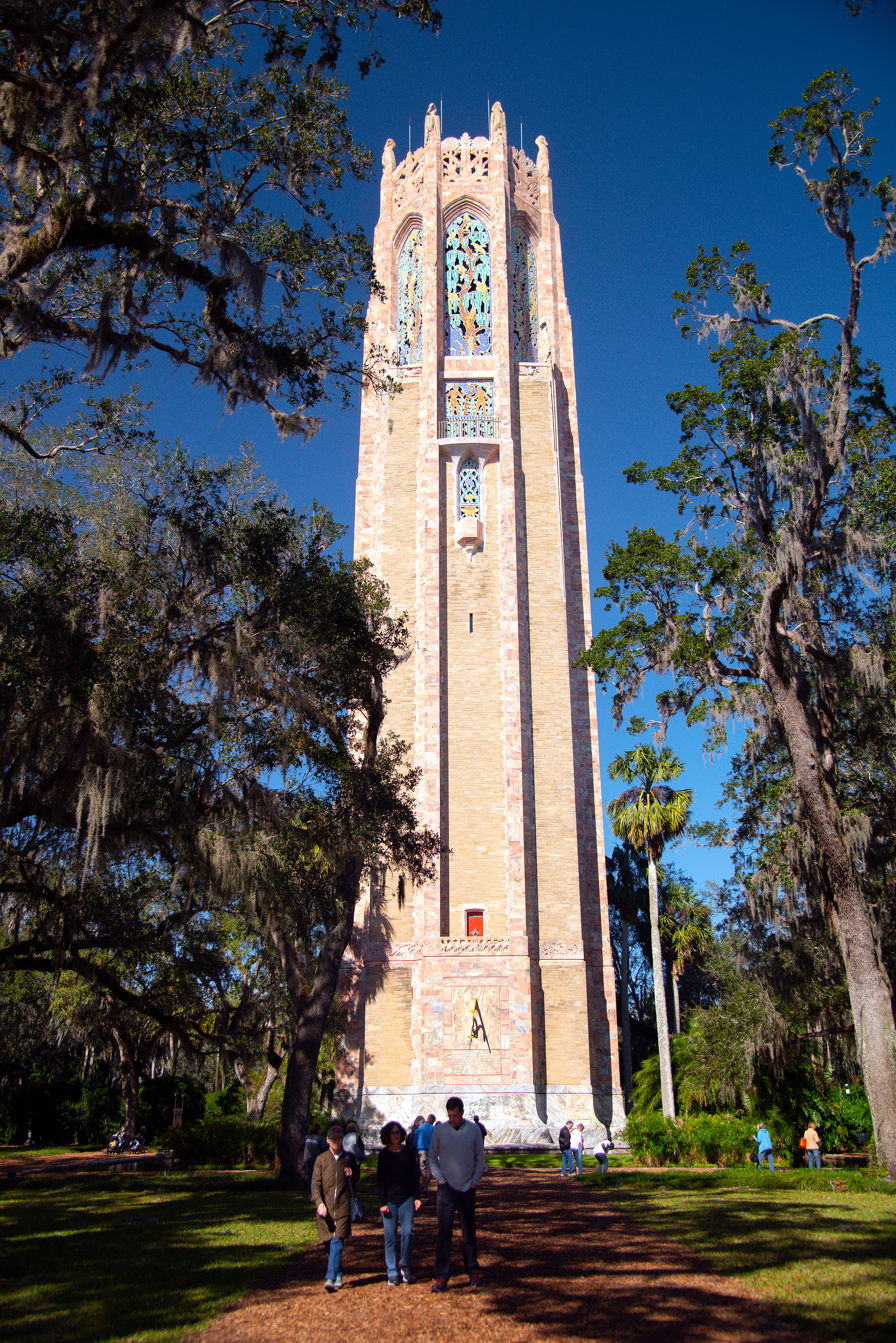
The south facade of the Singing Tower

Medary assembled a team of top artisans in their fields—the Art Deco architectural sculpture was designed and executed by Lee Lawrie, and depicts Florida flora and fauna; metalworker Samuel Yellin designed and executed the iron interior staircase, the iron gates to the two bridges over the moat, and the Great Brass Door, which features 30 scenes from the Book of Genesis; J. H. Dulles Allen designed and executed the ceramic mosaics, including the eight 35-foot (11 m)-tall grilles at the top of the tower. Horace H. Burrell & Son, of Philadelphia, was contractor for the tower. Construction began in 1927, and was completed two years later. Outgoing President Calvin Coolidge dedicated the tower on February 1, 1929.

The American Institute of Architects awarded Medary its 1929 Gold Medal for his Mountain Lake Sanctuary and Singing Tower. Medary died six months after the tower's dedication.

Edward W. Bok wrote a short book about the tower's planning and construction titled, America's Taj Mahal (1929). Bok died on January 9, 1930, and was interred before the tower's Great Brass Door.

In 1941, The Singing Tower was prominently featured in the TerryToons 308th animated short ‘‘The Bird Tower’’, directed by Mannie Davis and presented by Paul Terry, in which the Florida Singing Tower acts as its central setting, reimagining it as a resort hotel inhabited by birds, with the tower’s bells incorporated into the story.

=== Carillon and interior ===
The tower's 60-bell carillon was cast by John Taylor & Co, of Loughborough, England. The bell chamber is on the eighth floor of the tower, and just below it is a playing room that houses the clavier, or keyboard, that controls the bells. The bells are stationary, only the clappers move to sound them. The sixth floor is a studio for the carillonneur. Recitals are given daily.

The tower's interior is not generally open to the public. The first floor was Edward W. Bok's study, and is now called the Founder's Room. The second floor houses the Chao Research Center Archives, a collection of institutional records related to the tower. The third floor contains (now empty) water tanks, and the fourth floor is a work room. The fifth floor houses the Anton Brees Carillon Library, said to be the largest library of carillon music in the world.

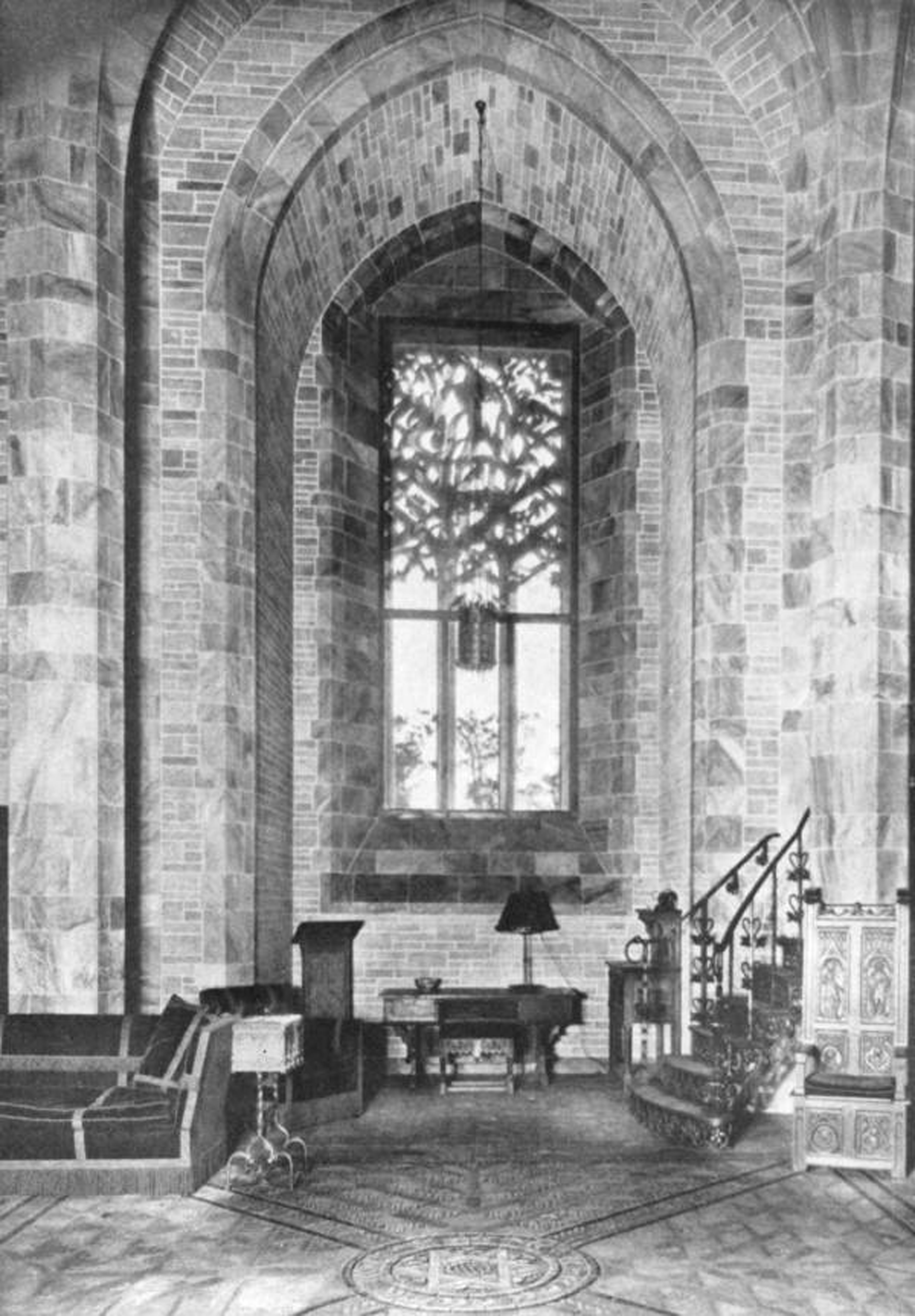
Edward W. Bok's study, now called the Founder's Room

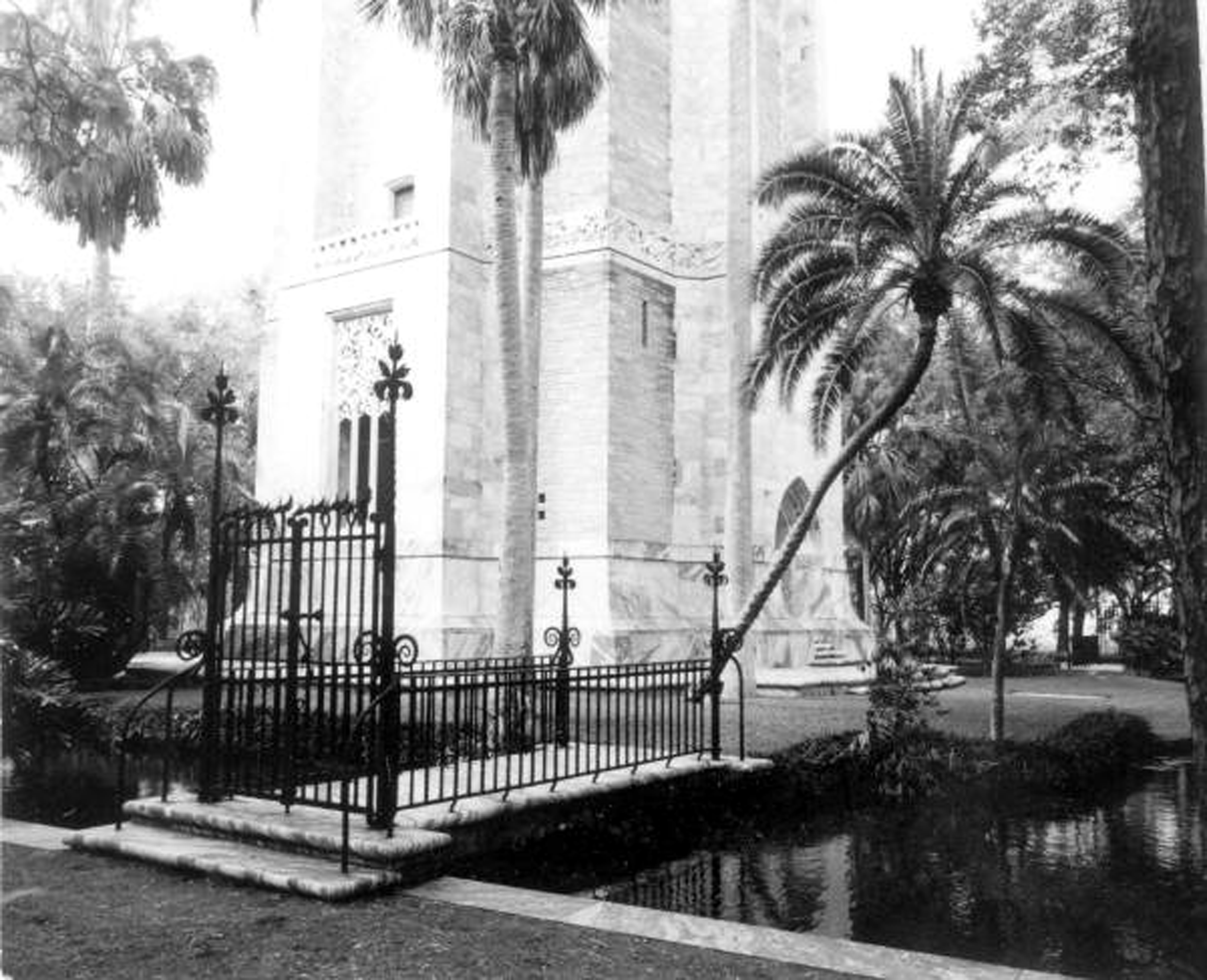
East bridge over moat, by Samuel Yellin

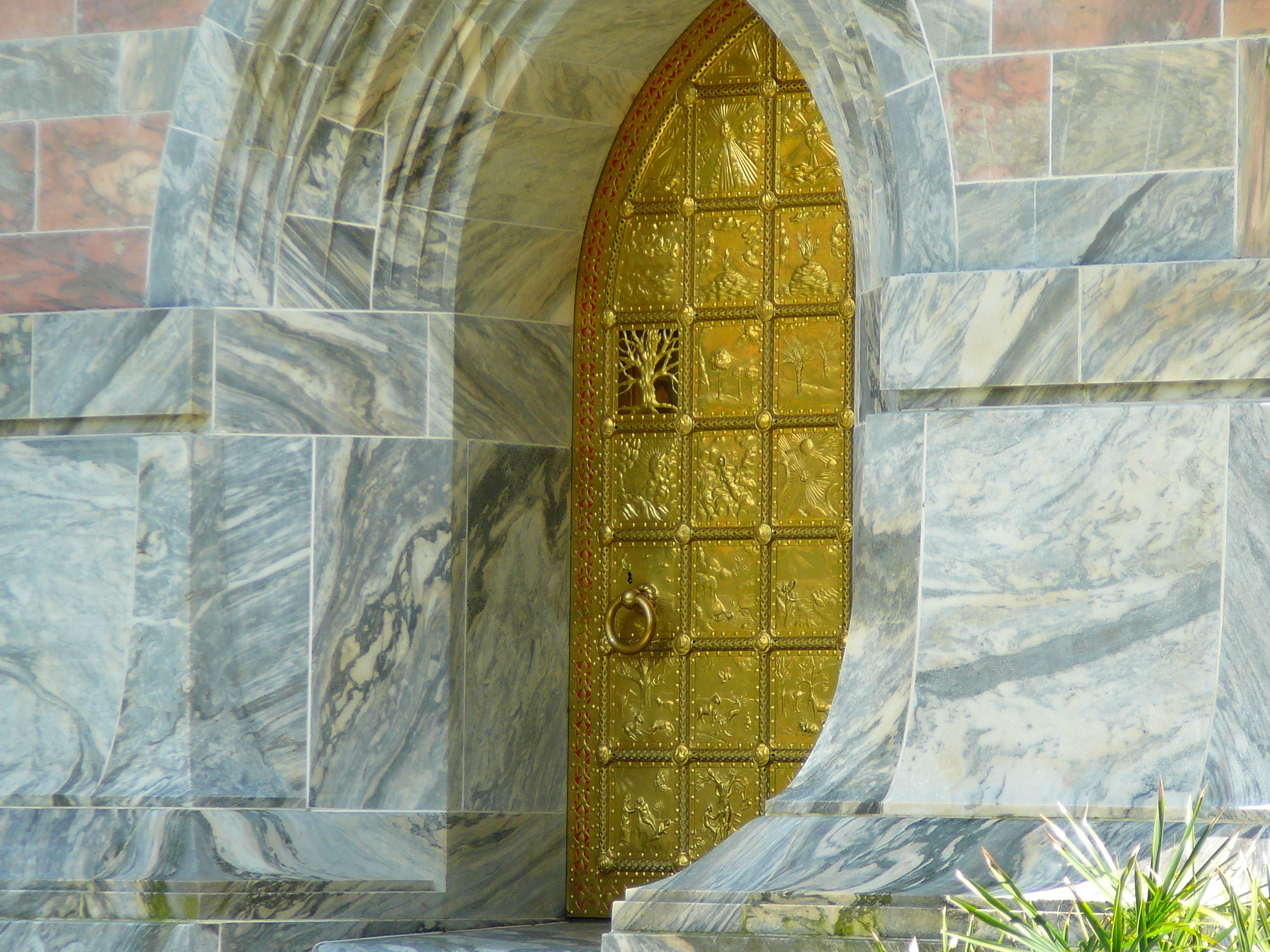
The Great Brass Door, by Samuel Yellin

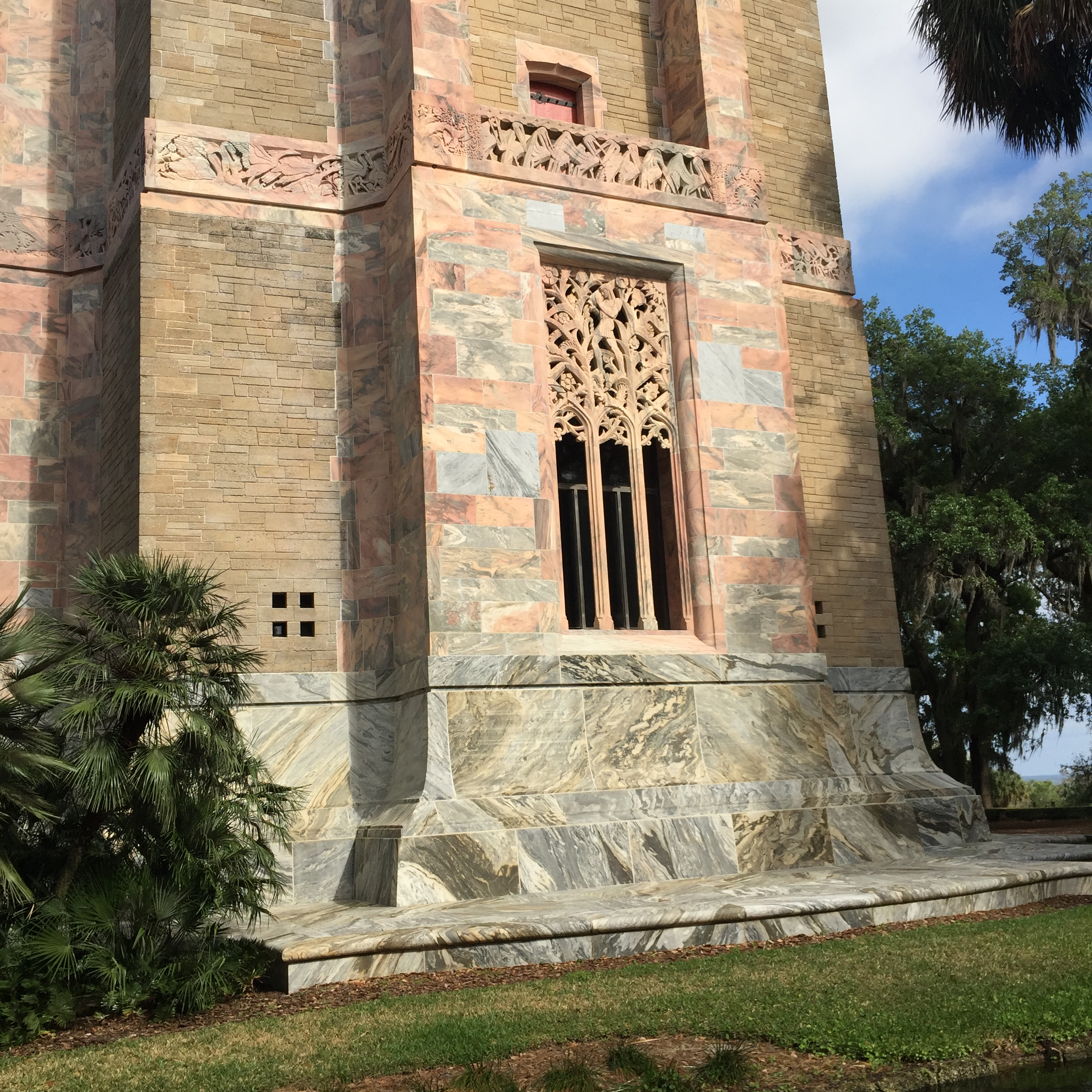
Heron Frieze and Waterer Window Grille by Lee Lawrie

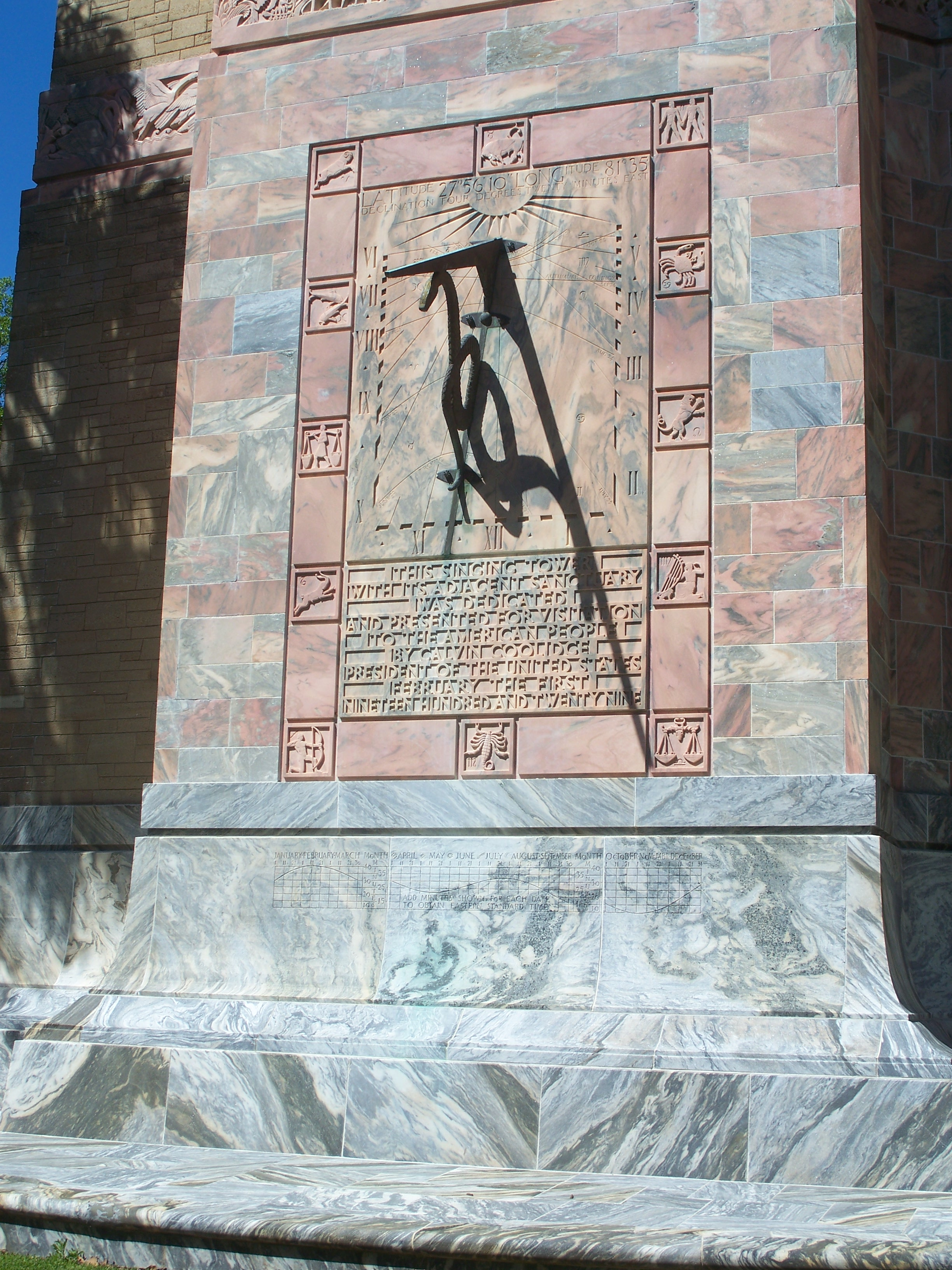
Sundial by Medary & Lawrie

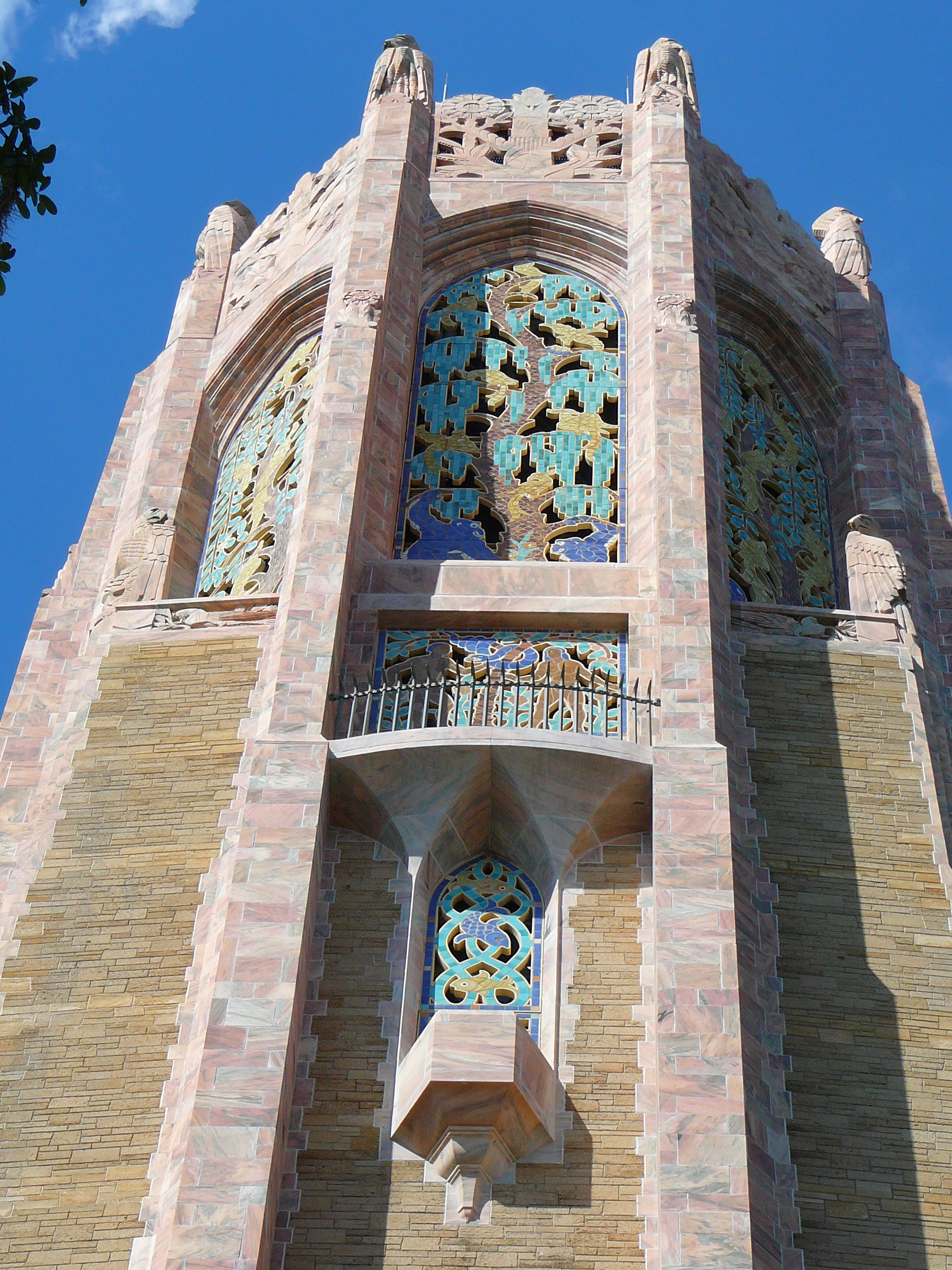
Glazed ceramic mosaics by J. H. Dulles Allen. Lawrie's eagles stand perched atop the piers.

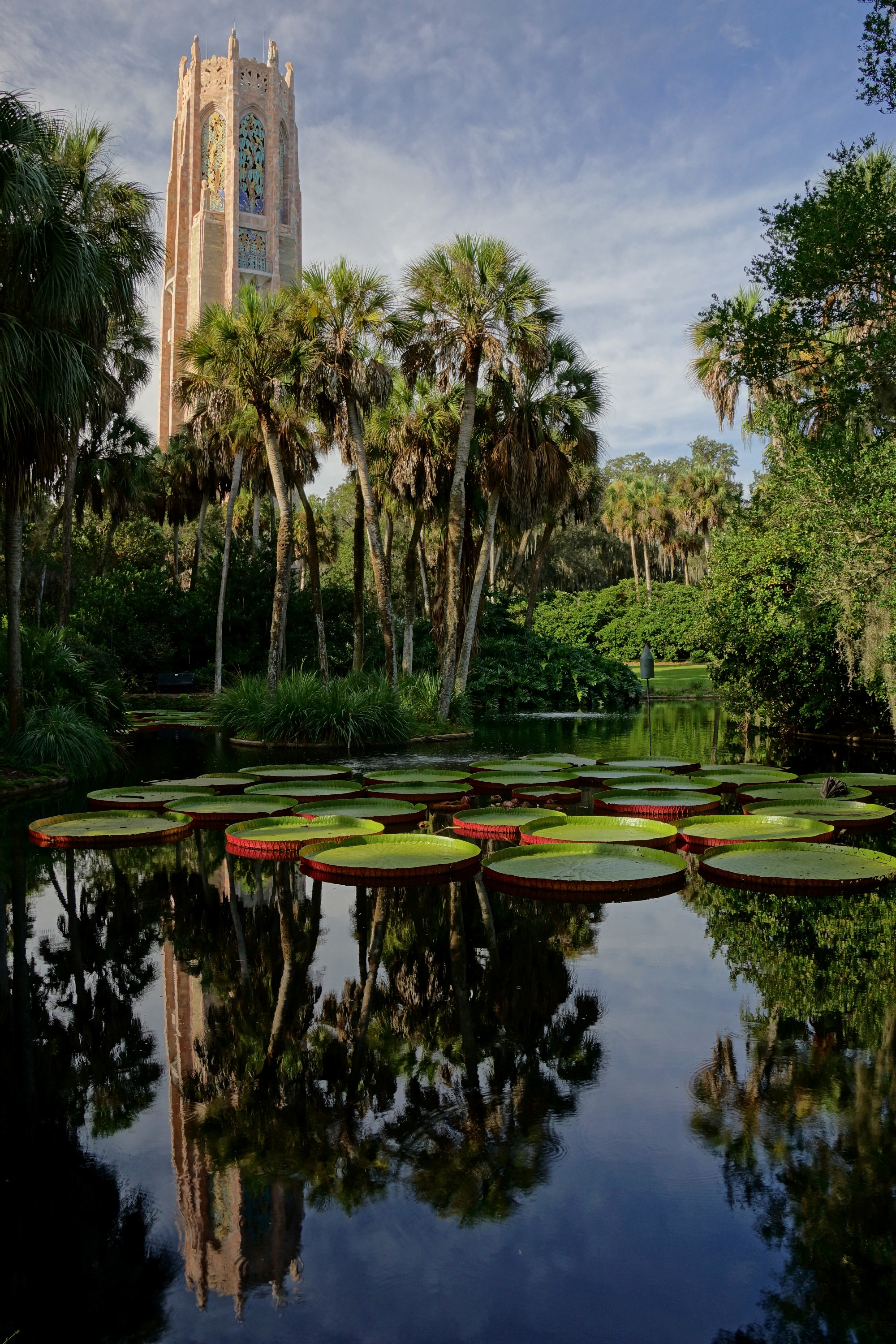
Reflecting pool

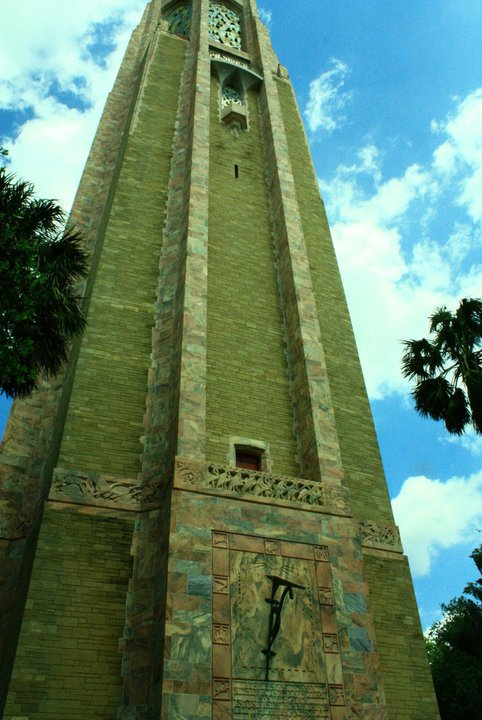
South facade

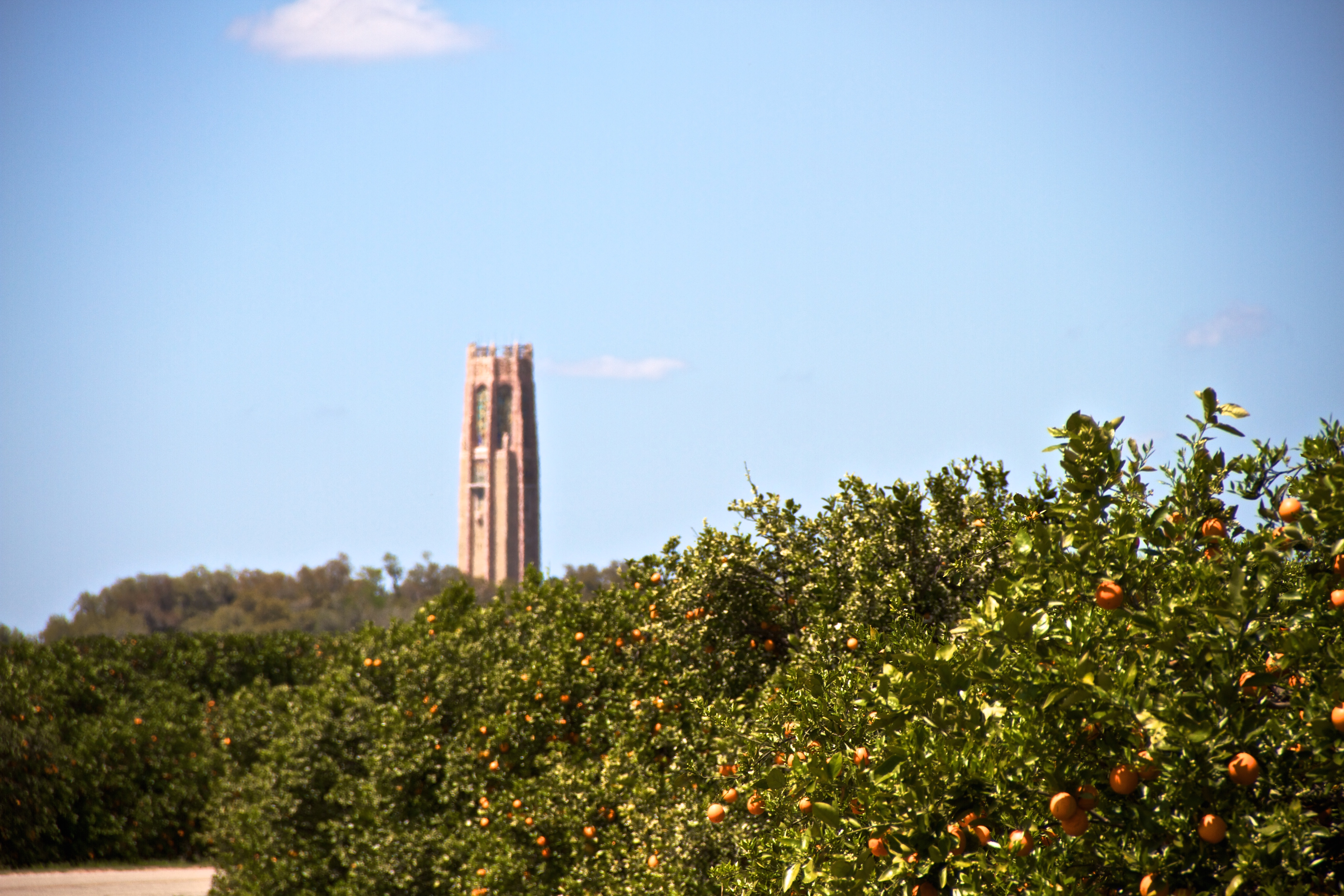
From the orange groves below the ridge

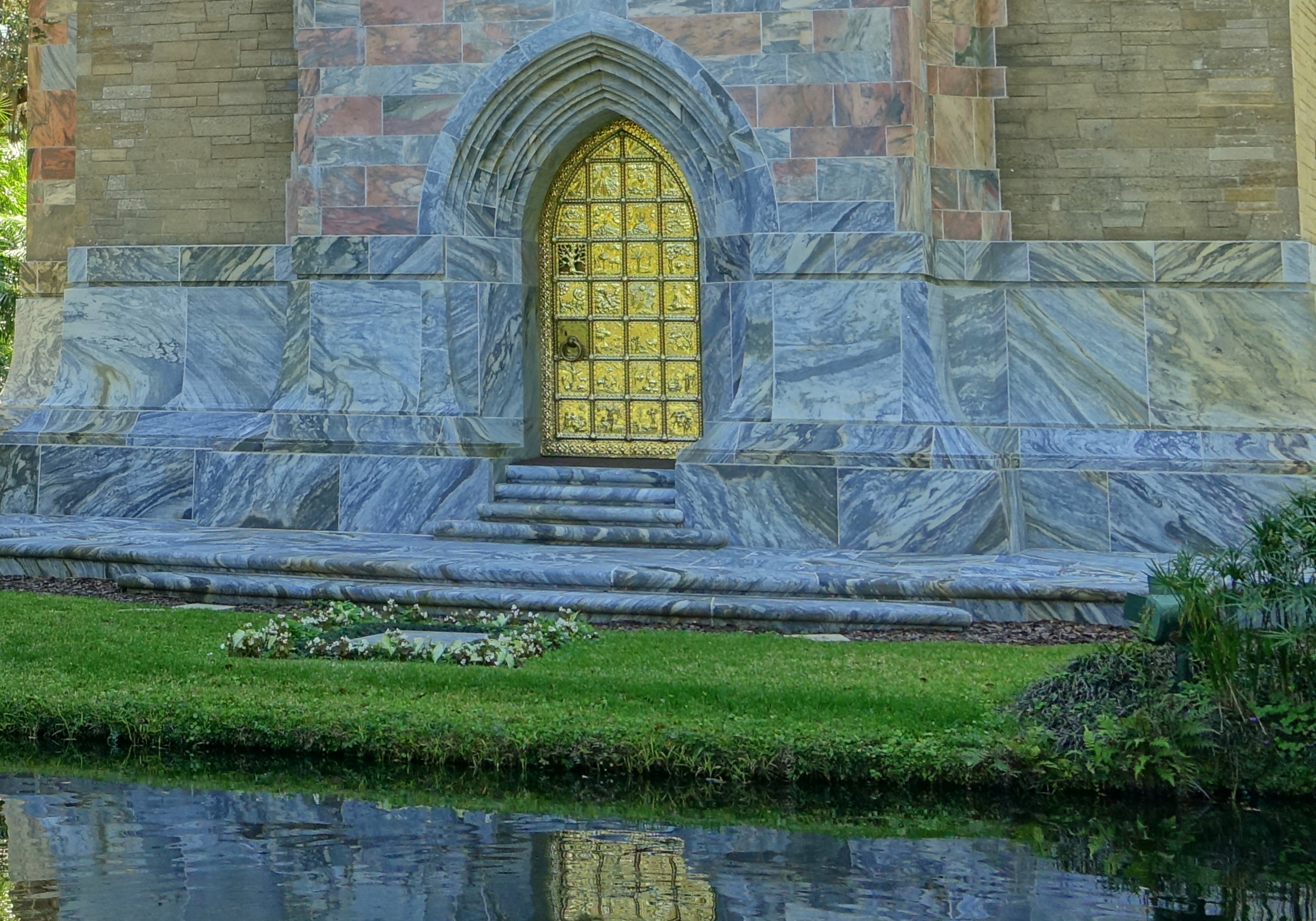
Edward W. Bok's grave lies before Yellin's Great Brass Door.

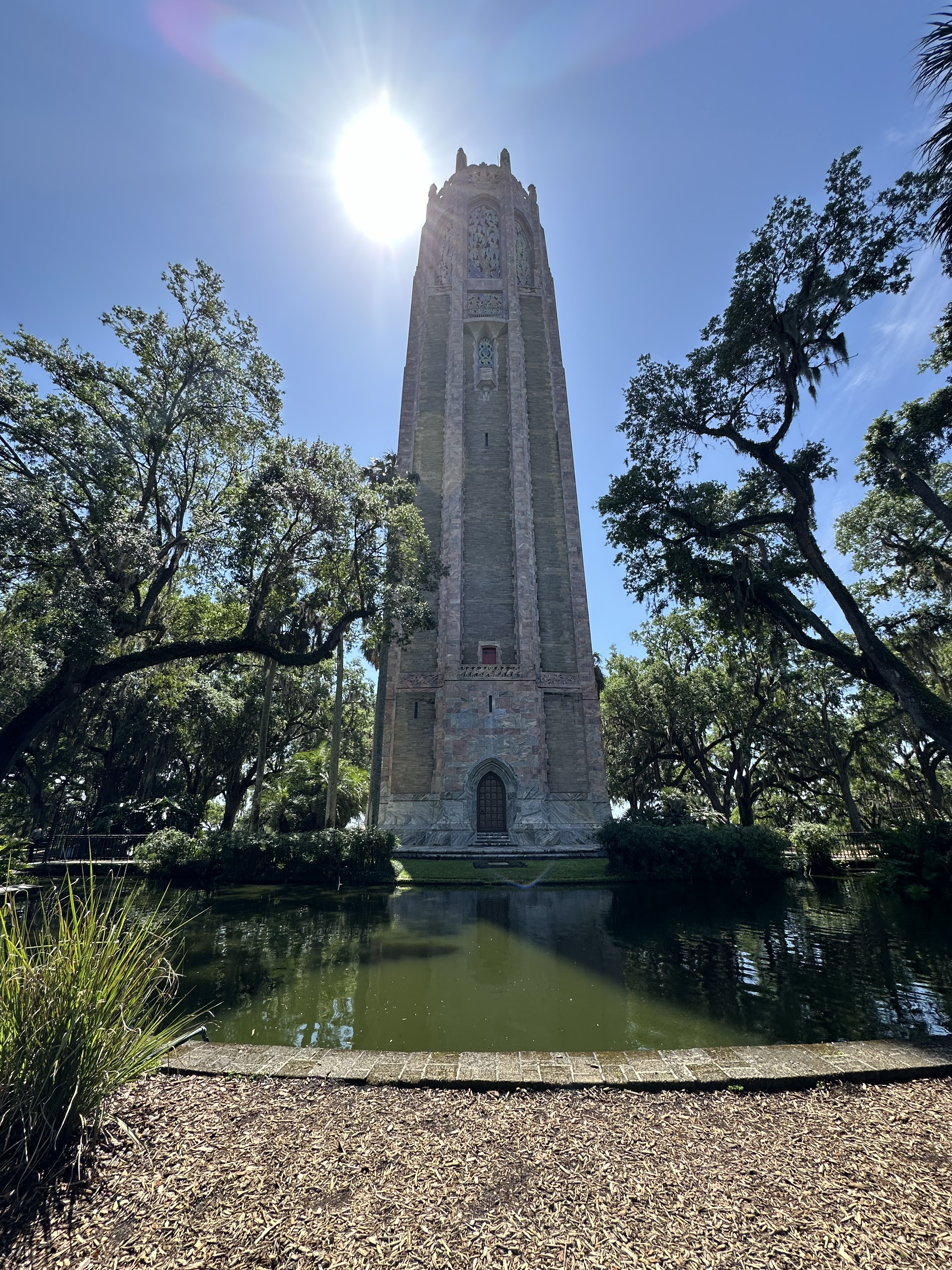
The Singing Tower at Bok Tower Gardens

== Bok Exedra ==
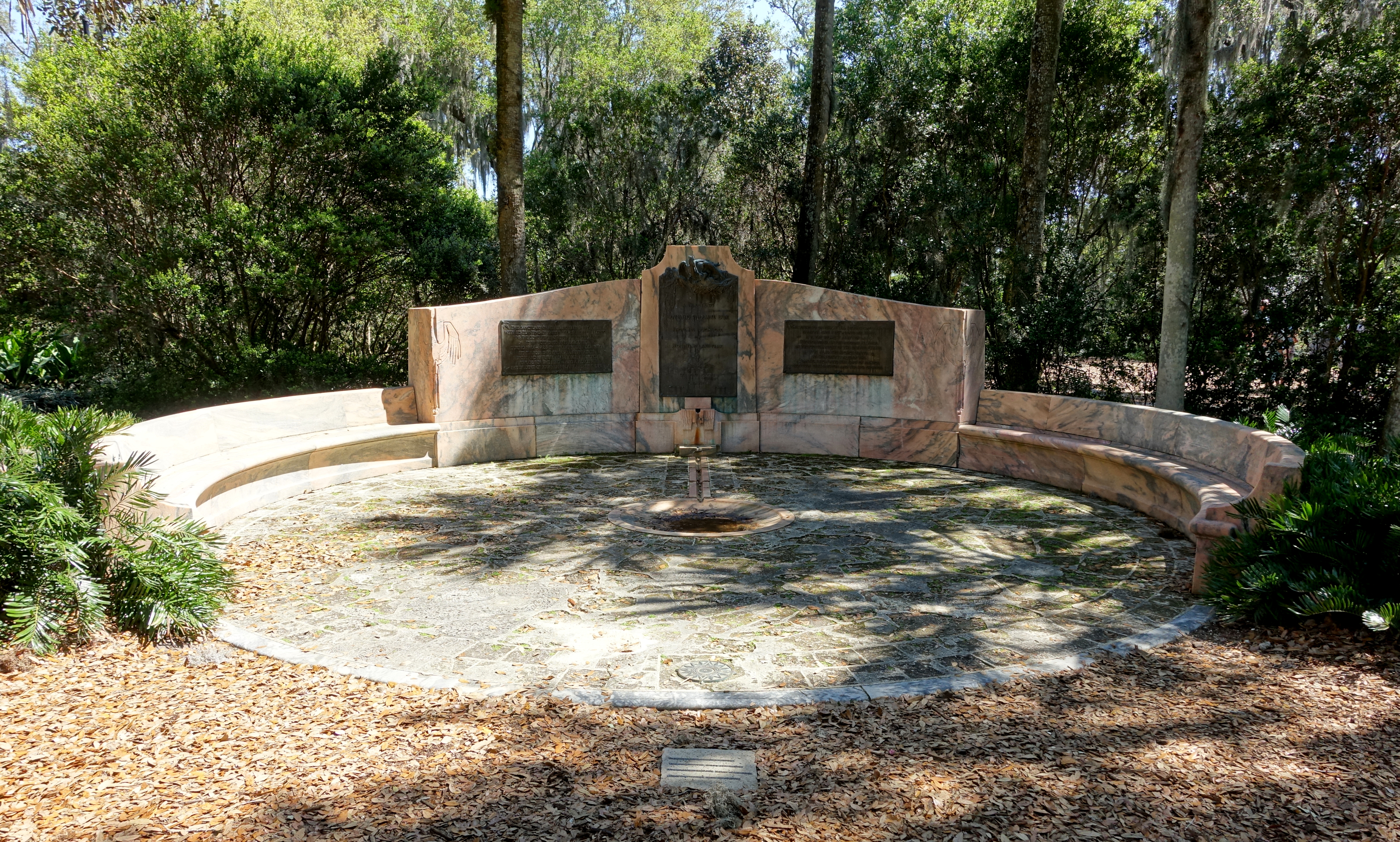
Bok Exedra

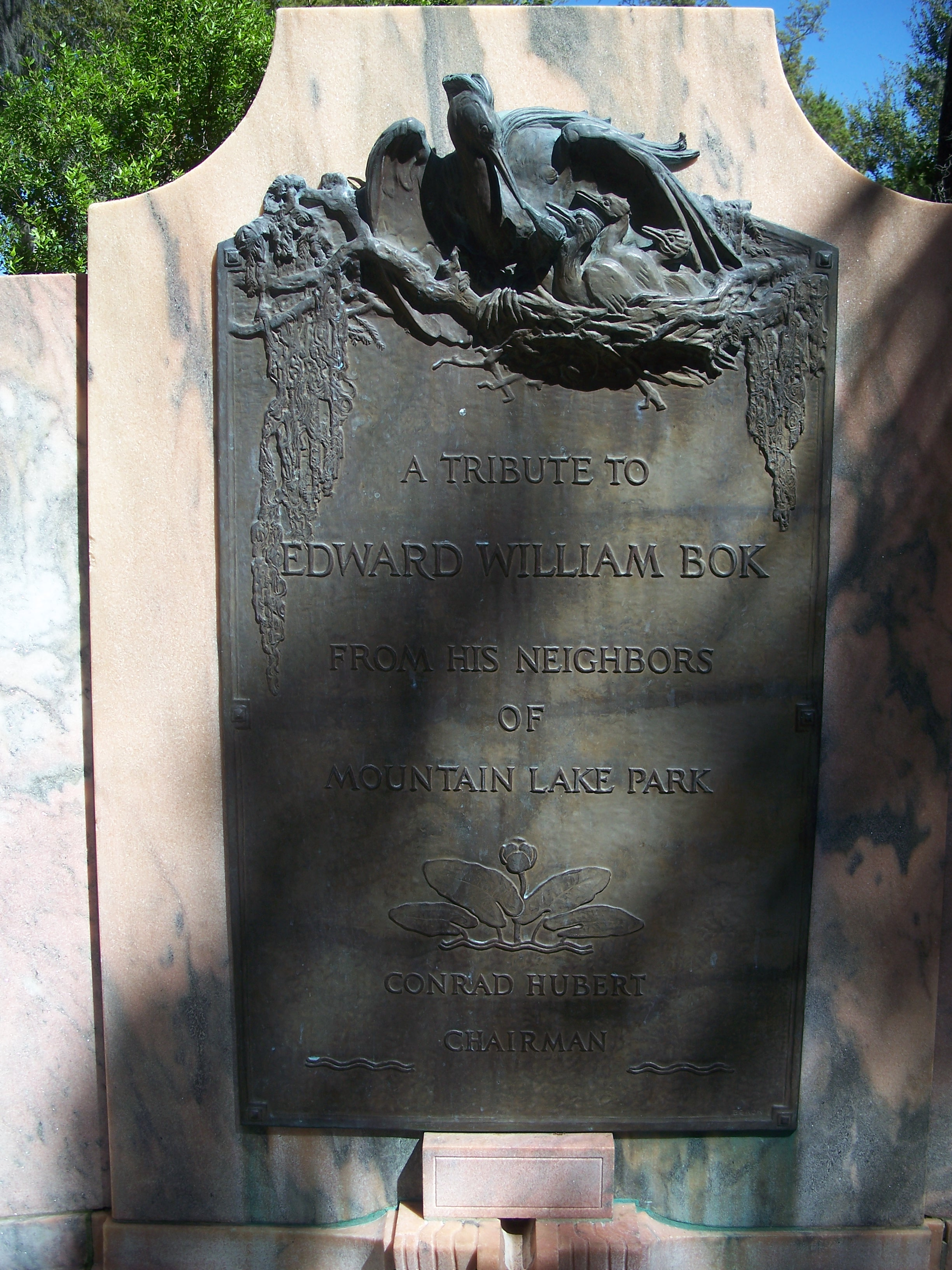
Dedication plaque, by Lee Lawrie

In appreciation for Edward W. Bok's extraordinary gift of the gardens and tower to the nation, a group of his neighbors from Mountain Lake, Florida, commissioned an exedra, or curving bench, in his honor, in 1930. This was created using the same pink and gray marble as the Singing Tower, and installed north of the tower. One of its bronze plaques reads:

This Sanctuary of approximately fifty acres,
with its planting of native vegetation of Florida,
was the conception of Edward William Bok.
It was designed and executed
during 1924-1928 by Frederick Law Olmsted,
its purpose is to provide a retreat of
repose and natural beauty for the human –
a refuge for the bird – and a place for
the student of Southern plant and bird life.

In 2022, Bok Tower Gardens received a matching grant of $500,000 from the Save America's Treasures program. While much of it was for landscaping restoration, a portion was to be used for "restoration and conservation of the Exedra water fountain".

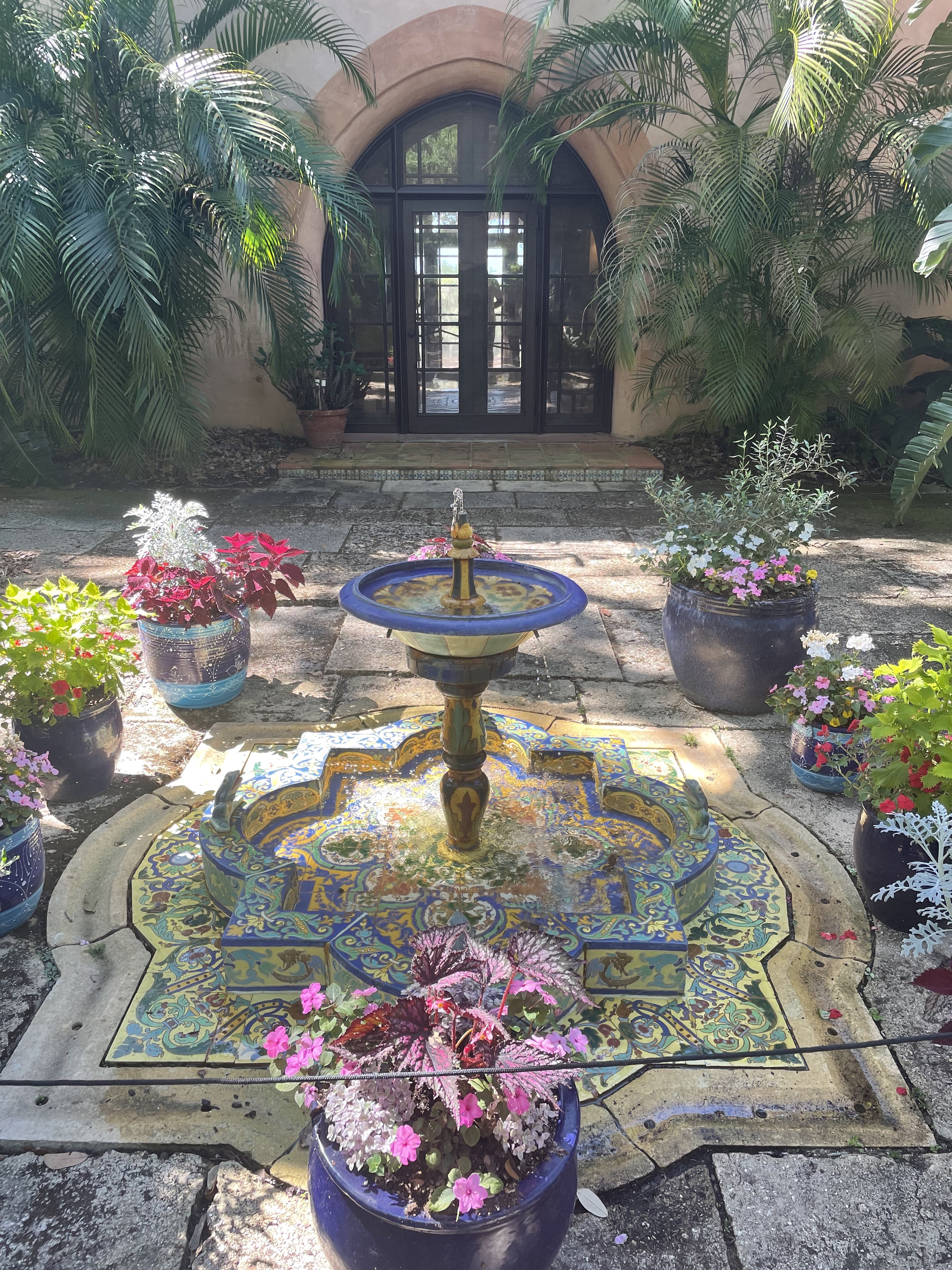

== Pinewood Estate/El Retiro ==
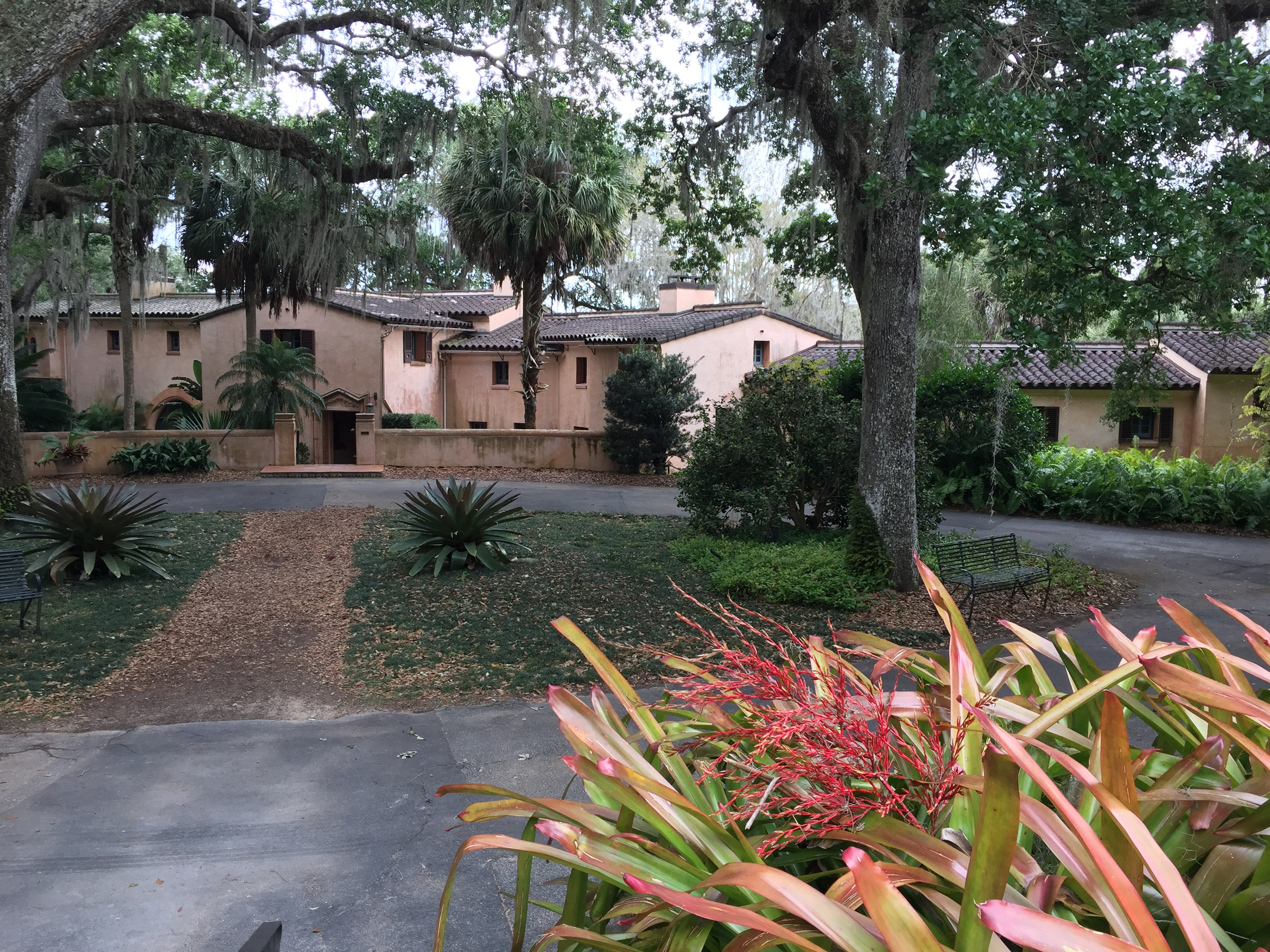
Pinewood

The Pinewood Estate comprises 8 acres (3.2 ha) of the gardens, and features a twenty-room Mediterranean Revival mansion. This was built between 1930 and 1932 as a winter residence by C. Austin Buck, vice-president of the Bethlehem Steel Company, in Pennsylvania. The mansion's former name was El Retiro, and it has been restored to its 1930s appearance. The El Retiro name is the one used for the estate as of 2023. Bok Tower Gardens hosts several events at the mansion during the year. The estate was entered into the National Register of Historic Places in December 1985. Guided tours of the mansion are given daily.

== Pine Ridge Trail ==
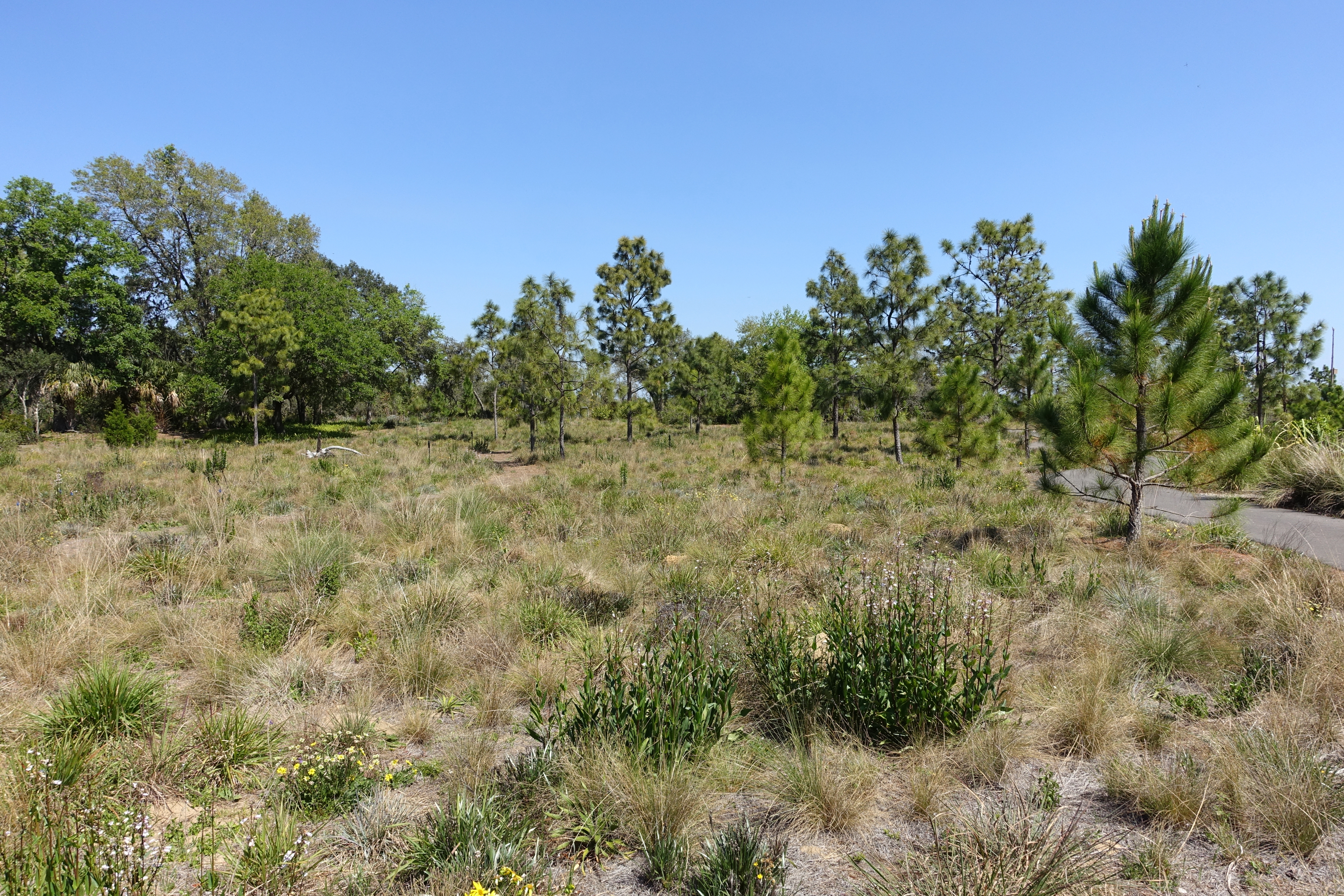
Pine Ridge Nature Preserve restores the native habitat

The Pine Ridge Nature Preserve and Trail is an ecosystem typified by an over-story of longleaf pine, sandhill habitats, and a dense ground cover of perennial grasses that includes a nature trail that begins at the Window by the Pond and extends for three-quarters of a mile ending at the Visitor Center. The trail is located on one of the highest points in peninsular Florida at 298 feet (91 m) above sea level. Long ago the Lake Wales Ridge was a chain of islands. The plants and animals found on the ridge are unique because they evolved on the chain of islands, which is why the most rare plants and animals can be found in this area. The Pine Ridge is home to several endangered animals including the gopher tortoise, eastern indigo snake, gopher frogs, and the Florida mouse. Conservation efforts for the pine trail by Bok Tower Gardens include restoration of native plants, the regulation of invasive species and educating the public.

== Visitor Center ==
Originally built in 1997, Bok Tower Gardens' Visitor Center completed a $1.8 million expansion in 2019. The Ting Tsung and Wei Fong Chao Exhibit Hall houses a redesigned exhibition showcasing the landmark's history, architecture, and surrounding wildlife and ecology. The information desk, an orientation film, a local art exhibit space, and the administrative offices are located in the Visitor Center. In separate buildings attached to the Visitor Center by covered walkways and a promenade are the Tower & Garden Gift Shop and the Blue Palmetto Café.

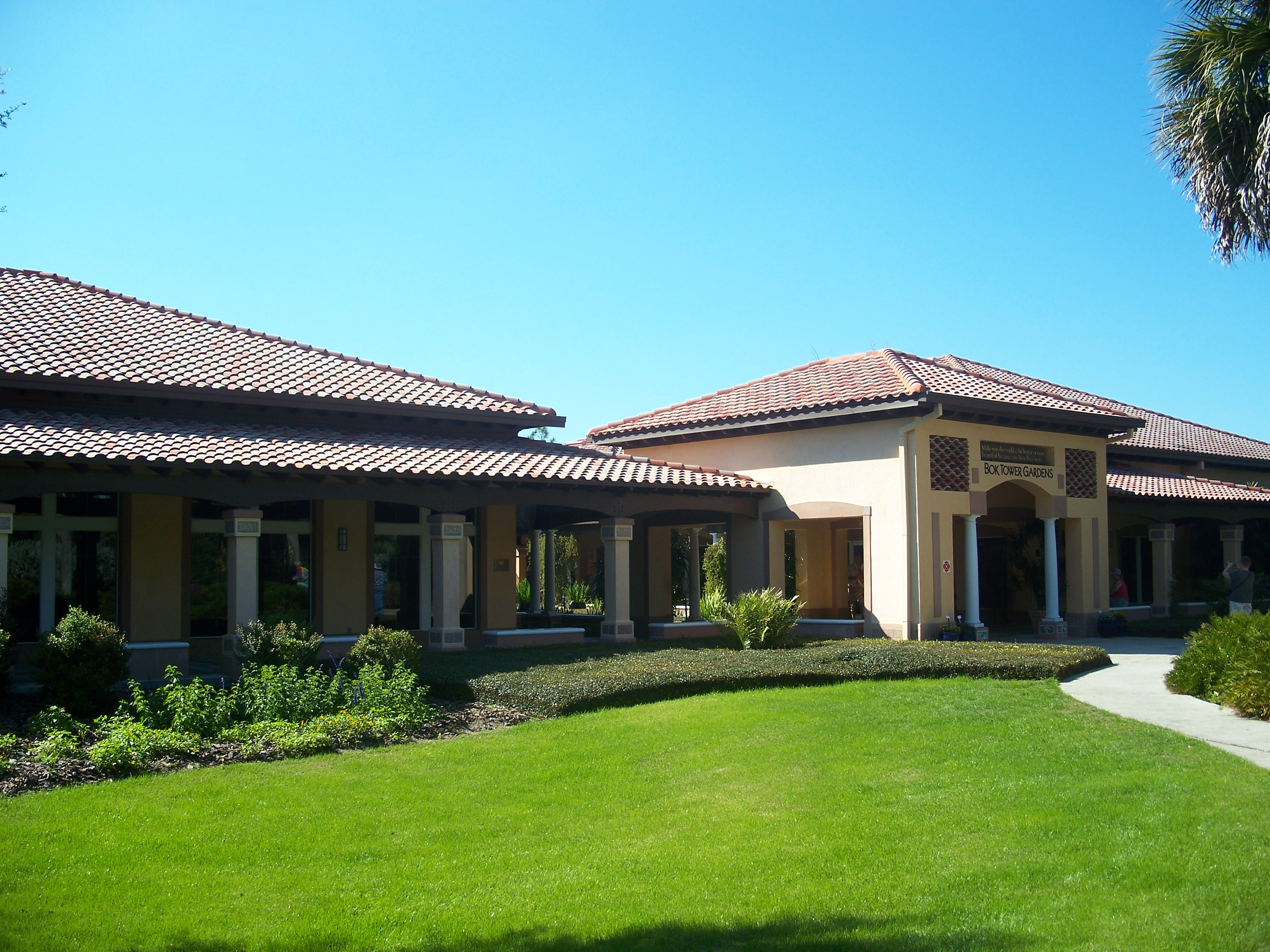
Visitor Center

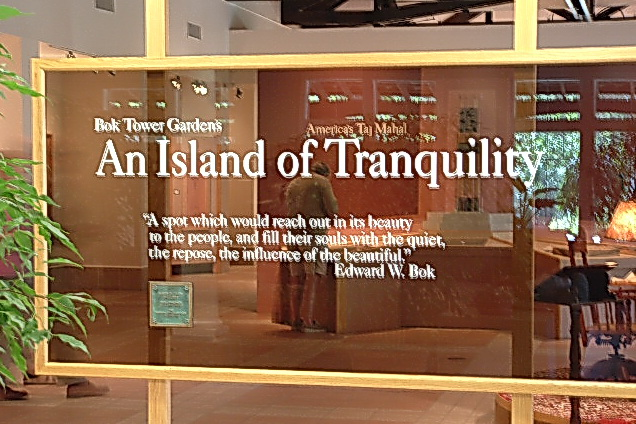
Exhibit

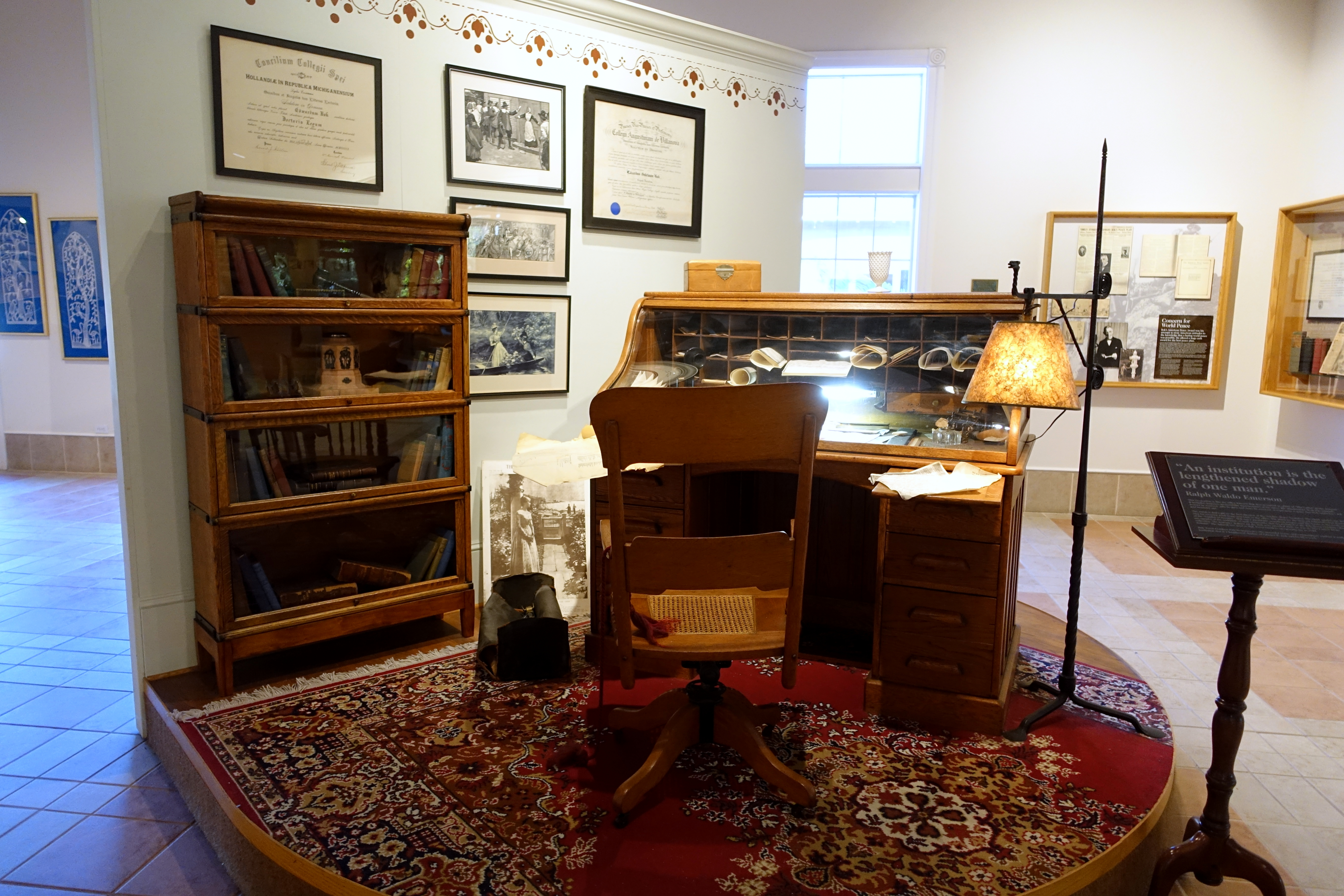
Edward W. Bok exhibit

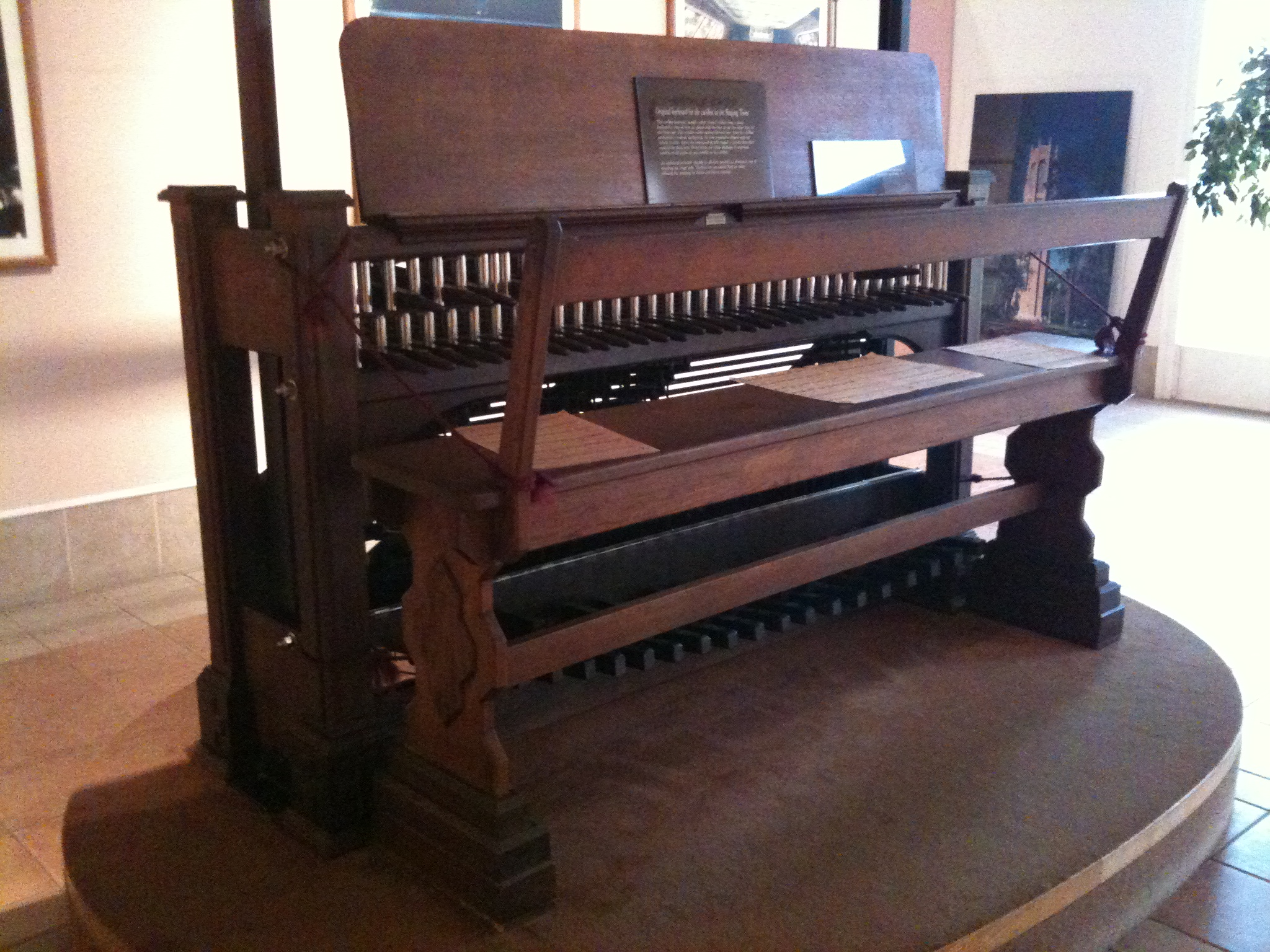
Carillon keyboard exhibit

== Library and archives ==
The Singing Tower houses collections that document the history and growth of the gardens and its buildings, along with Pinewood Estate. While the collections are closed to the public, selections from the archives are displayed in the Visitor Center.

=== Anton Brees Carillon Library ===
The Anton Brees Carillon Library was established in 1968 following the death of Anton Brees, the first carillonneur of the Singing Tower. The library is on the fifth floor of the tower. Its holdings are considered to be one of the largest collections of carillon-related materials in the world.

The collection includes more than 1,500 books, 200 scores for keyboard instruments, 3,000 scores and musical compositions for carillon, 1,600 audio and video recordings, and 15 international professional journals that include more than 900 individual volumes. The library also houses vertical files on international carillons, that include newspaper clippings, biographical information and concert programs. The holdings include the original blueprints and plans for the Singing Tower and gardens, and thousands of photographs and slides. Collections include The Guild of Carillonneurs in North America Archives, Ronald Barnes Collection, Anton Brees Collection, Sidney Giles Collection and Arthur Bigelow Collection.

=== Chao Research Center Archives ===
The Chao Research Center Archives holds the official papers of Bok Tower Gardens, along with related collections. It occupies the second floor of the Singing Tower, and was created through a donation from the Ting Tsung and Wei Fong Chao Foundation, in 2008. The papers include architectural and landscape architectural drawings, business papers, correspondence and other documents, all kept in delicate archival storage. Its holdings also include the Nellie Lee Bok Collection, the American Foundation Collection, and the Edward Bok Newspaper Scrapbook Collection.

The Nellie Lee Bok Collection features her personal communications, photographs, manuscript writings, and family possessions. The American Foundation Collection features newspaper scrapbooks, meeting minutes, publications, and other manuscript materials. The Edward Bok Newspaper Scrapbook Collection is made up of 42 bound scrapbooks filled with newspaper clippings about Bok's publications and charitable acts.

Access to the collections of the Chao Research Center Archives is available by appointment only.:

=== Pinewood Estate Collections ===
The Pinewood Estate Mansion features furniture, ceramics and other objects that were in the house prior to Bok Tower Gardens' purchase of the property in 1970. Other collections held at Pinewood Estate include letters, promotional materials, and manuscripts. Pinewood Estate/El Retiro is open to visitors through most of the year at a small fee.

=== Education ===
All of the Education Department's programs and field trips align with the Florida Sunshine State Standards and Polk County Curriculum Maps. The lessons presented in the Education Department's curriculum guide cover academic areas such as science, nature, visual & performance arts, culture and history. The curriculum guide was created to help students explore and discover Bok Tower Gardens before, during and after their trip. Contained in the curriculum guide is detailed information about the gardens, the Singing Tower, the Pinewood Estate and the Visitor Center.

== Events ==
Throughout the year, there are numerous events designed to draw visitors to the gardens. These vary year to year but have included concerts featuring jazz and orchestral music, and the daily playing of the carillon bells. Most popular are the semi-annual evening symphony concerts, given once in the fall and once in the spring. These draw thousands of visitors to the large field in front of the Tower for an outdoor picnic, and feature music from both the orchestra and the carillon.

== See also ==
- Florida Citrus Tower
- Stephen Foster Memorial Carillon
- List of botanical gardens and arboretums in Florida
