= Anton Brees Carillon Library =

Music library in Lake Wales, Florida, US

- 27°56′07″N 81°34′39″W
- Location: Lake Wales, Florida, United States
- Established: 1968

Other information
- Website: boktowergardens.org/library-archives/

The Anton Brees Carillon Library, located within the Singing Tower at Bok Tower Gardens, Lake Wales, Florida, is home to various collections that document the history and development of the Singing Tower and its gardens, the historic Pinewood Estate, and The Guild of Carillonneurs in North America. It also contains many sources on carillon art in general.

== History ==
The library was created in 1968 following the death of Anton Brees, the first carillonneur at the Singing Tower. It is named in his honor. A carillon is a musical instrument consisting of at least 23 tuned bells in chromatic series, played from a keyboard. A carillonneur is the individual that plays this instrument. The Bok Tower was created in 1929, along with magnificent gardens and its unique Singing Tower carillon. Edward W. Bok was the founder of the Bok Tower and its gardens, which was originally intended as a bird sanctuary. The Anton Brees library was created later and for a number of reasons no individuals are allowed inside the library. Historical materials from the library are available through an online catalog and digital collections. In-person access to the collections is available by appointment only.

In 1971, Professor Stephen Fry was hired as a Music Librarian Consultant to organize the collection.

In 2013, the library was awarded a Council on Library and Information Resources (CLIR) Cataloging Hidden Special Collections and Archives grant to catalog more than 80 linear feet and 40 boxes of vertical files. The grant application was submitted due to the need for more employees to engage in work in the library and archives, such as hiring more interns and allowing for more full-time workers as well as bringing more accessibility to the collection. This grant also included the archives of the Guild of Carillonneurs in North America (GCNA), which have been housed in Bok Tower Gardens since 1993. A formal agreement to this housing was made between the two parties in 2012, which required only minimal processing of the GCNA archives. The grant allowed for the hiring of a library special projects assistant (PA). During the initial cataloging and processing, at-risk material was rehoused into acid-free folders and non-deteriorated boxes. Items relevant to the library were shifted from the GCNA archives to the Anton Brees Carillon Library. During processing, employees noted, "We discovered items unrelated to the scope of the collection, which had been retained simply because they contained the image of a bell.” Some of these processed materials included those found in the Chao Research Center. Finding aids were created for carillons of North America as well as several foreign carillons, notable carillonneurs, and carillon bell foundries. The CLIR grant continued through 2016.

== Holdings ==
The Anton Brees Carillon Library is located on the fifth level of the Singing Tower. It is one of the largest collections of carillon-related materials in the world.

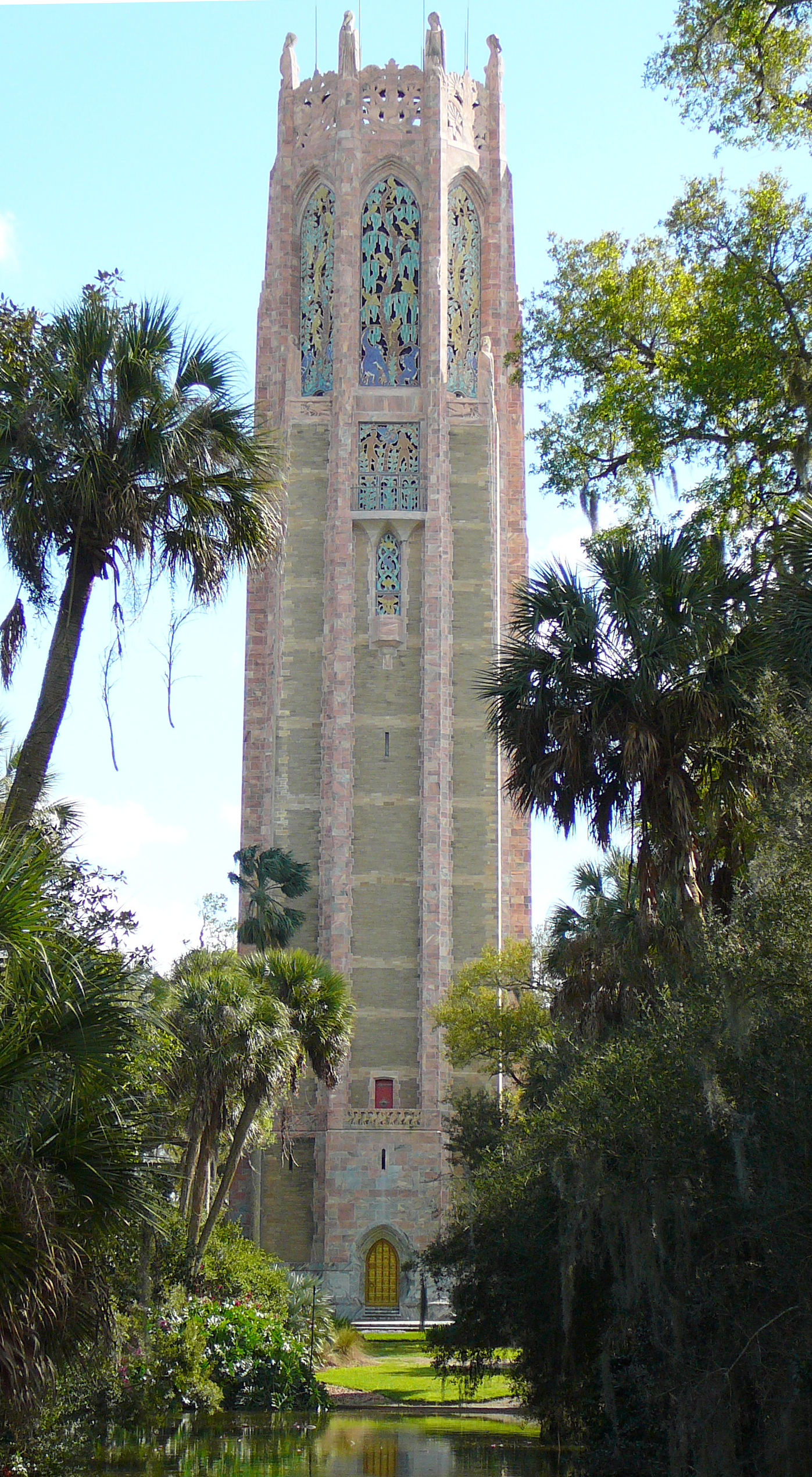
The Bok Tower, home of the Anton Brees carillon library.

While a relatively small collection with approximately 1,500 books of carillon and related literature, it is the scope of its holdings and ephemera that makes the library unique. In addition to these books, the library also house 900 volumes of trade journals devoted to various aspects of carillon art and related industries. Most important, though, is its collection of over 3,000 musical scores written for the carillon. The library also has 3,000 audio and video recordings, musical scores for keyboard instruments, and various documents relating to carillon concerts and biographies. Finally, the library includes information on North American and foreign carillons, individuals, and bell foundries.

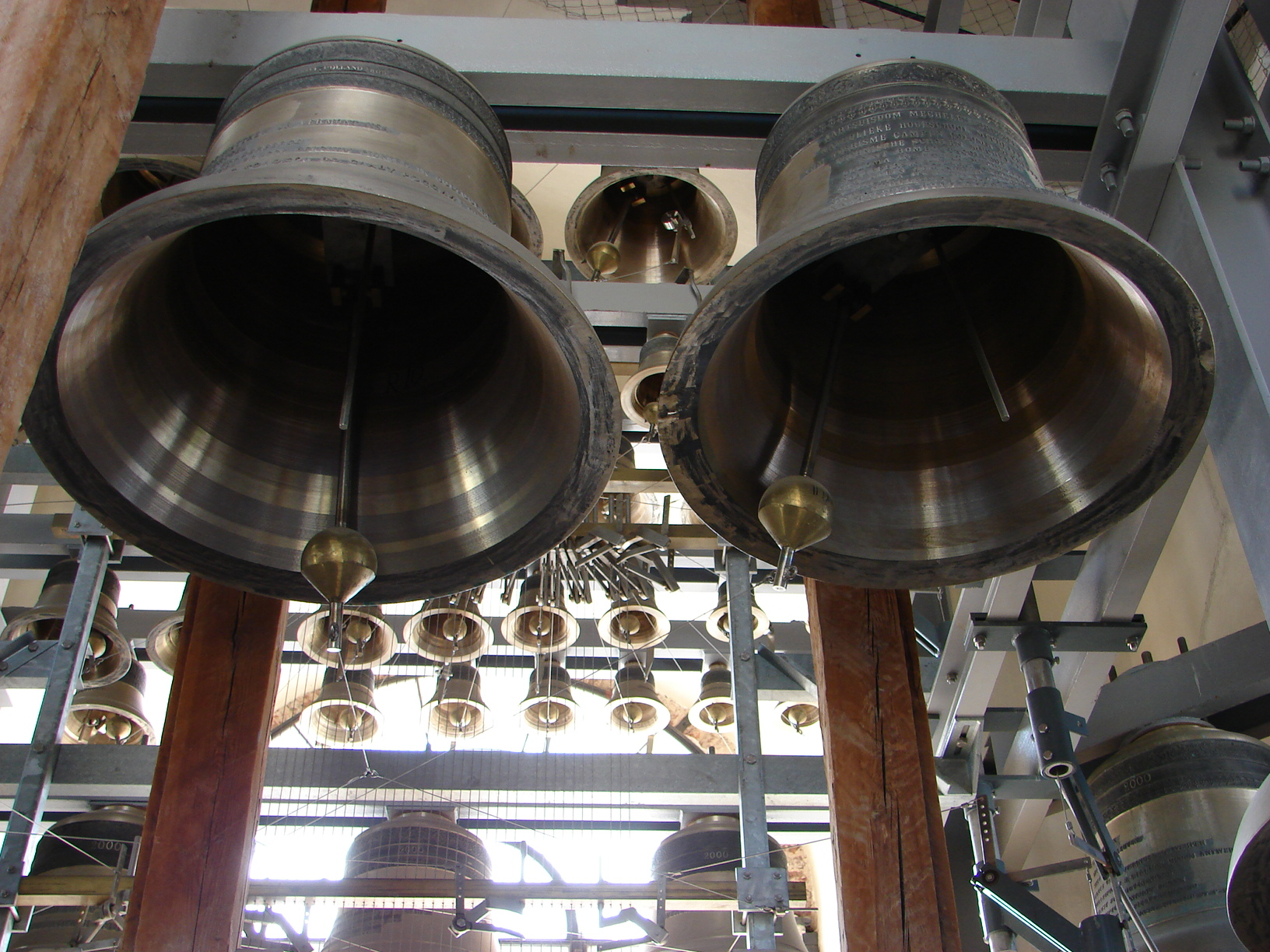
Carillon bells

== Collections ==
The library is home to five separate collections. These collections are the ABCL vertical files, The Guild of Carillonneurs in North America archives, Ronald Barnes collection, Anton Brees collection, Sidney Giles collection, and the Arthur Bigelow collection.

A growing digital archive of the collection provides access to digitized papers, photographs, and ephemera from the collection alongside finding aids and descriptive metadata for interested researchers.

The Singing Tower also houses the Chao Research center archives, which includes four separate collections: The Nellie Lee Bok collection of manuscripts and personal correspondence, the American Foundation collection, the Edward Bok newspaper scrapbook collection, and the Pinewood Estate collections.
