= Iron Mountain (Florida) =

Mountain in Florida, United States

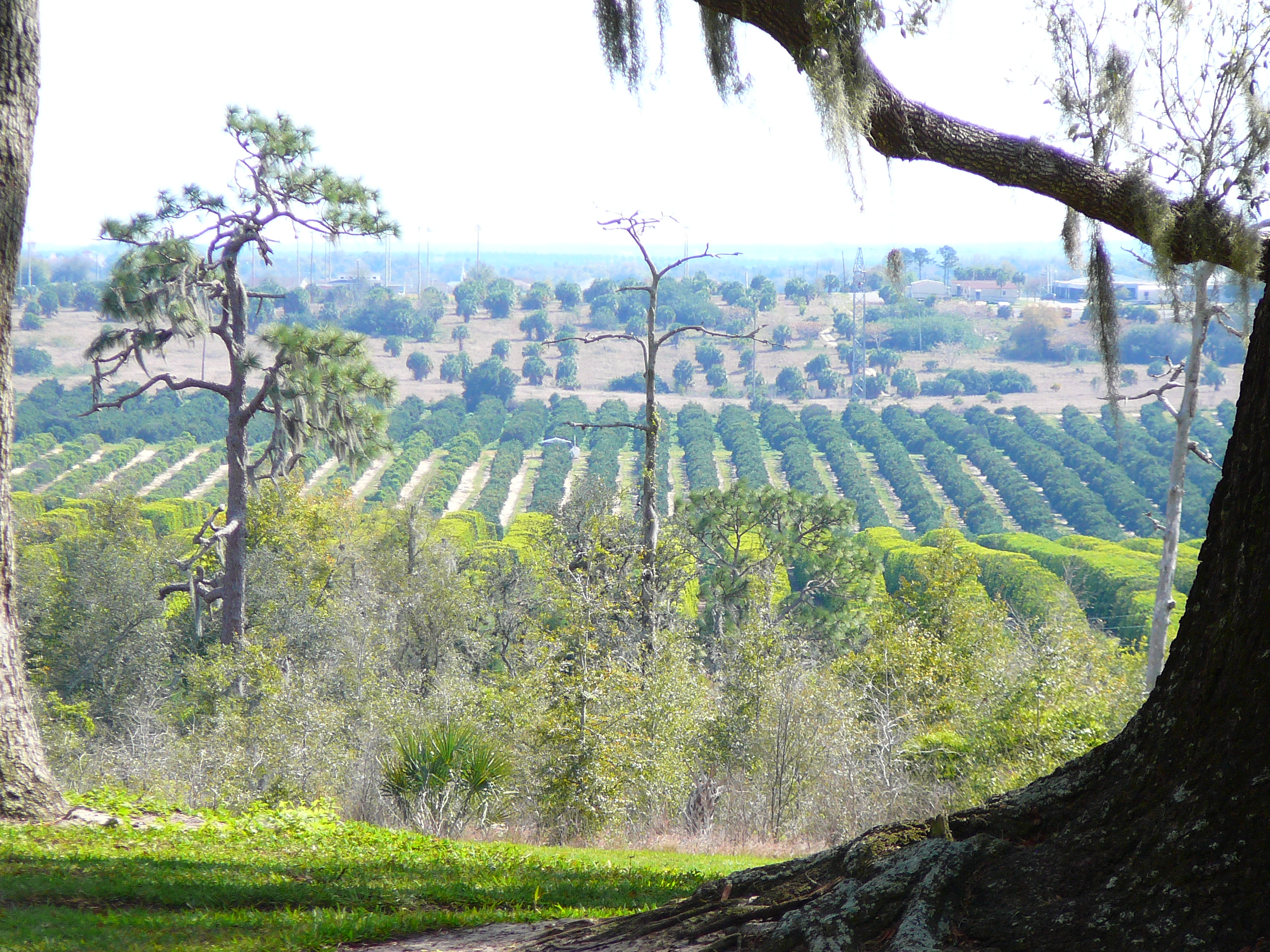
- View from the summit of Iron Mountain, overlooking orange groves

Highest point
- Elevation: 295 ft (90 m)
- Coordinates: 27.93583°N 81.577359°W

Geography
- Location: Lake Wales, Florida, United States
- Parent range: Lake Wales Ridge

Geology
- Mountain type: Hill
- Rock type: Citronelle formation (hematite-rich)

Climbing
- Easiest route: Road access via Bok Tower Gardens

Iron Mountain is one of the highest points in peninsular Florida, United States and a prominent point of the Lake Wales Ridge. Rising 295 feet (90 m) above sea level, The mountain contains citronelle, a hematite-containing rock that oxidizes when exposed to air and is responsible for the red-brown color of the earth. The ridge is located just north of the city of Lake Wales. The tower of Bok Tower Gardens is built on the summit.

== See also ==
- List of Florida's highest points
