= National Register of Historic Places listings in Polk County, Florida =

Location of Polk County in Florida

This is a list of the National Register of Historic Places listings in Polk County, Florida.

This is intended to be a complete list of the properties and districts on the National Register of Historic Places in Polk County, Florida, United States. The locations of National Register properties and districts for which the latitude and longitude coordinates are included below, may be seen in a map.

There are 77 properties and districts listed on the National Register in the county, including 2 National Historic Landmarks.

This National Park Service list is complete through NPS recent listings posted April 18, 2025.

Contents: Counties in Florida (non-linked contain no National Register listings)
Alachua - Baker - Bay - Bradford - Brevard - Broward - Calhoun - Charlotte - Citrus - Clay - Collier - Columbia - DeSoto - Dixie - Duval - Escambia - Flagler - Franklin - Gadsden - Gilchrist - Glades - Gulf - Hamilton - Hardee - Hendry - Hernando - Highlands - Hillsborough (Tampa) - Holmes - Indian River - Jackson - Jefferson - Lafayette - Lake - Lee - Leon - Levy - Liberty - Madison - Manatee - Marion - Martin - Miami-Dade (Miami) - Monroe - Nassau - Okaloosa - Okeechobee - Orange - Osceola - Palm Beach - Pasco - Pinellas - Polk - Putnam - St. Johns - St. Lucie - Santa Rosa - Sarasota - Seminole - Sumter - Suwannee - Taylor - Union - Volusia - Wakulla - Walton - Washington

== Current listings ==
	Name on the Register	Image	Date listed	Location	City or town	Description
1	Atlantic Coast Line Railroad Depot	Atlantic Coast Line Railroad Depot	August 31, 1990 (#90001277)	325 South Scenic Highway; 28°03′50″N 81°47′26″W	Lake Wales	Part of the Lake Wales MPS
2	Auburndale Citrus Growers Association Packing House	Auburndale Citrus Growers Association Packing House	July 17, 1997 (#97000794)	214 Orange Street; 28°03′47″N 81°47′29″W	Auburndale	
3	Auburndale City Hall	Auburndale City Hall	December 24, 2013 (#13000964)	1 Bobby Green Plaza; 28°03′53″N 81°47′22″W	Auburndale	
4	Babson Park Woman's Club	Babson Park Woman's Club	October 17, 1997 (#97001229)	1300 North Scenic Highway; 27°50′21″N 81°31′50″W	Babson Park	
5	Bartow Downtown Commercial District	Bartow Downtown Commercial District	May 18, 1993 (#93000393)	Roughly bounded by Davidson and Summerlin Streets and Broadway and Florida Avenues; 27°53′47″N 81°50′34″W	Bartow	Part of the Bartow MPS
6	Ephriam M. Baynard House	Ephriam M. Baynard House	November 10, 2001 (#01001208)	208 West Lake Avenue; 28°04′02″N 81°47′22″W	Auburndale	
7	Beacon Hill-Alta Vista Residential District	Beacon Hill-Alta Vista Residential District	March 4, 1993 (#93000130)	Roughly bounded by South Florida Avenue, West Beacon Road, West Belvedere Street, and Cherokee Trail; 28°01′18″N 81°57′35″W	Lakeland	
8	Biltmore-Cumberland Historic District	Biltmore-Cumberland Historic District	June 4, 2004 (#04000565)	Roughly bounded by South Ingraham Avenue, East Lime Street, Bartow Road, Hollingsworth Road, and McDonald Place; 28°02′27″N 81°56′33″W	Lakeland	
9	Bok Mountain Lake Sanctuary and Singing Tower	Bok Mountain Lake Sanctuary and Singing Tower	August 21, 1972 (#72000350)	3 miles north of Lake Wales; 27°56′06″N 81°34′37″W	Lake Wales	
10	Lawrence Brown House	Lawrence Brown House	January 4, 2001 (#00001594)	470 Second Avenue; 27°53′36″N 81°50′03″W	Bartow	Part of the Bartow MPS
11	B. K. Bullard House	B. K. Bullard House	August 31, 1990 (#90001272)	644 South Lakeshore Boulevard; 27°53′41″N 81°34′40″W	Lake Wales	Part of the Lake Wales MPS
12	Casa De Josefina	Casa De Josefina	June 10, 1975 (#75000567)	2 miles southeast of Lake Wales off U.S. Route 27; 27°51′53″N 81°34′18″W	Lake Wales	
13	Central Avenue School	Central Avenue School	July 22, 1999 (#99000865)	604 South Central Avenue; 28°02′05″N 81°58′23″W	Lakeland	
14	Chalet Suzanne	Chalet Suzanne	July 24, 1990 (#90001085)	3800 Chalet Suzanne Drive; 27°57′18″N 81°36′01″W	Lake Wales	
15	Christ Church	Christ Church	May 6, 1976 (#76000605)	526 North Oak; 27°45′07″N 81°47′47″W	Fort Meade	
16	Church of the Holy Spirit	Church of the Holy Spirit	August 31, 1990 (#90001271)	1099 Hesperides Road; 27°53′38″N 81°33′54″W	Lake Wales	Part of the Lake Wales MPS
17	Cleveland Court School	Cleveland Court School	July 22, 1999 (#99000862)	328 East Edgewood Drive; 28°00′41″N 81°57′15″W	Lakeland	
18	John F. Cox Grammar School	John F. Cox Grammar School	July 22, 1999 (#99000864)	1005 North Massachusetts Avenue; 28°03′22″N 81°57′13″W	Lakeland	
19	Craney Spec Houses Historic District	Craney Spec Houses Historic District	August 27, 2019 (#100004349)	Drexel Ave. NE between 15th St. and 16th St. 28°01′36″N 81°42′03″W	Winter Haven	
20	Cypress Gardens	Cypress Gardens	April 14, 2014 (#14000152)	1 Legoland Way; 27°59′24″N 81°41′31″W	Winter Haven	
21	Davenport Historic District	Davenport Historic District	August 15, 1997 (#97000894)	Roughly bounded by Suwannee and Orange Avenues, Palmento Street, and West Boulevard; 28°09′28″N 81°36′09″W	Davenport	
22	Dixie Walesbilt Hotel	Dixie Walesbilt Hotel	August 31, 1990 (#90001273)	115 North First Street; 27°54′07″N 81°35′24″W	Lake Wales	Part of the Lake Wales MPS
23	Dixieland Historic District	Dixieland Historic District	December 23, 1994 (#94001479)	Roughly bounded by Walnut Street, Florida Avenue, Lake Hunter, Hartsell Avenue, and Belvedere Street; 28°01′54″N 81°57′45″W	Lakeland	
24	Downtown Haines City Commercial District	Downtown Haines City Commercial District	March 7, 1994 (#94000150)	Roughly bounded by Hinson and Ingraham Avenues and 4th and 7th Streets; 28°06′28″N 81°37′37″W	Haines City	Part of the Haines City MPS
25	Downtown Winter Haven Historic District	Downtown Winter Haven Historic District	February 4, 2002 (#01001414)	Roughly Avenue A, NW., Avenue A, SW., and 3rd and 5th Streets; 28°01′18″N 81°43′49″W	Winter Haven	Part of the Winter Haven, Florida MPS
26	East Lake Morton Residential District	East Lake Morton Residential District	July 9, 1993 (#93000621)	Roughly bounded by Orange Street, Ingraham Avenue, Palmetto Street, Lake Morton Drive, and Massachusetts Avenue; 28°02′21″N 81°56′59″W	Lakeland	
27	El Retiro	El Retiro	December 12, 1985 (#85003331)	Mountain Lake off Road 17; 27°56′16″N 81°34′10″W	Lake Wales	
28	John H. Evans House	John H. Evans House	October 24, 2022 (#100008019)	730 Buena Vista Dr. 28°06′01″N 81°43′53″W	Lake Alfred	
29	First Baptist Church	First Baptist Church	August 31, 1990 (#90001275)	338 East Central Avenue; 27°54′02″N 81°35′01″W	Lake Wales	Part of the Lake Wales MPS
30	Florida Southern College Architectural District	Florida Southern College Architectural District	June 11, 1975 (#75000568)	McDonald and Johnson Avenues; 28°01′52″N 81°56′48″W	Lakeland	Contains the largest single-site collection of Frank Lloyd Wright architecture.
31	Fort Meade Historic District	Fort Meade Historic District	July 29, 1994 (#94000781)	Roughly bounded by North 3rd Street, Orange Avenue, South 3rd Street, and Sand Mountain Road; 27°45′05″N 81°48′07″W	Fort Meade	
32	Griffin Grammar School	Griffin Grammar School	June 5, 2007 (#07000509)	3315 Kathleen Road; 28°05′04″N 81°59′43″W	Lakeland	
33	Henley Field Ball Park	Henley Field Ball Park	May 23, 1997 (#97000458)	1125 North Florida Avenue; 28°03′24″N 81°57′23″W	Lakeland	
34	Benjamin Franklin Holland House	Benjamin Franklin Holland House	April 3, 1975 (#75000566)	590 East Stanford Street; 27°53′39″N 81°50′23″W	Bartow	
35	Homeland School	Homeland School	February 2, 2007 (#07000001)	249 Church Avenue; 27°49′08″N 81°49′44″W	Homeland	
36	Interlaken Historic Residential District	Interlaken Historic Residential District	March 28, 2002 (#02000266)	Roughly bounded by the northern shore of Lake Howard, the southwestern shore of Lake Mirror, and the Cannon-Howard Canal; 28°03′05″N 81°45′10″W	Winter Haven	Part of the Winter Haven, Florida MPS
37	Holland Jenks House	Holland Jenks House	March 7, 1996 (#96000254)	119 Raintree Court; 28°07′06″N 81°47′39″W	Auburndale	
38	C. L. Johnson House	C. L. Johnson House	September 21, 1989 (#89001481)	315 East Sessoms Avenue; 27°54′20″N 81°35′05″W	Lake Wales	
39	Lake Hunter Terrace Historic District	Lake Hunter Terrace Historic District	December 20, 2002 (#02001536)	Roughly Central Avenue, Greenwood Street, Ruby Street, and Sikes Boulevard; 28°02′08″N 81°58′14″W	Lakeland	
40	Lake Mirror Promenade	Lake Mirror Promenade	January 27, 1983 (#83001437)	Between Lemon Street and Lake Mirror Drive; 28°02′38″N 81°57′06″W	Lakeland	
41	Lake of the Hills Community Club	Lake of the Hills Community Club	March 24, 2000 (#00000265)	41 East Starr Avenue; 27°57′19″N 81°35′35″W	Lake Wales	
42	Lake Wales City Hall	Lake Wales City Hall	August 31, 1990 (#90001274)	152 East Central Avenue; 27°54′02″N 81°35′16″W	Lake Wales	Part of the Lake Wales MPS
43	Lake Wales Commercial Historic District	Lake Wales Commercial Historic District	May 10, 1990 (#90000732)	Roughly bounded by Scenic Highway, Central Avenue, Market Street, and Orange Avenue; 27°54′07″N 81°35′16″W	Lake Wales	Part of the Lake Wales MPS
44	Lake Wales Historic Residential District	Lake Wales Historic Residential District	August 8, 1997 (#97000858)	Roughly bounded by the former Seaboard Air Line railroad grade, the CSX railroad tracks, East Polk Avenue, and South and North Lake Shore Boulevards; 27°54′13″N 81°35′03″W	Lake Wales	
45	W. Henry Lewis House	W. Henry Lewis House	September 19, 2012 (#12000791)	424 North Oak Street; 27°45′26″N 81°47′50″W	Fort Meade	
46	Mann Manor	Mann Manor	October 13, 2011 (#11000718)	325 West Main Street; 27°53′47″N 81°50′44″W	Bartow	
47	Mountain Lake Colony House	Mountain Lake Colony House	February 22, 1991 (#91000113)	East of State Road 17 on the northern shore of Mountain Lake; 27°56′12″N 81°35′34″W	Lake Wales	
48	Mountain Lake Estates Historic District	Mountain Lake Estates Historic District	August 26, 1993 (#93000871)	State Road 17, north of Lake Wales; 27°55′57″N 81°35′22″W	Lake Wales	
49	Munn Park Historic District	Munn Park Historic District	November 3, 1997 (#97001228)	Roughly bounded by East Bay Street, North Florida Avenue, East Orange Street, and East Main Street; 28°02′37″N 81°57′17″W	Lakeland	
50	North Avenue Historic District	North Avenue Historic District	October 12, 2001 (#01001086)	100 block of North Avenue; 27°54′35″N 81°35′28″W	Lake Wales	
51	Northeast Bartow Residential District	Northeast Bartow Residential District	May 18, 1993 (#93000392)	Roughly bounded by Jackson and First Avenues and by Church and Boulevard Streets; 27°53′57″N 81°50′15″W	Bartow	Part of the Bartow MPS
52	Oak Hill Cemetery	Oak Hill Cemetery	February 12, 2003 (#03000006)	West Parker Street; 27°53′36″N 81°50′53″W	Bartow	Part of the Bartow MPS
53	Oates Building	Oates Building	July 28, 1995 (#95000925)	230 South Florida Avenue; 28°02′29″N 81°57′26″W	Lakeland	
54	Old Central Grammar School	Old Central Grammar School	March 17, 1994 (#94000160)	801 Ledwith Avenue; 28°06′12″N 81°37′29″W	Haines City	Part of the Haines City MPS
55	Old Dundee ACL Railroad Depot	Old Dundee ACL Railroad Depot	July 30, 2001 (#01000739)	103 Main Street; 28°01′19″N 81°37′19″W	Dundee	Part of the Florida's Historic Railroad Resources MPS
56	Old Frostproof High School	Old Frostproof High School	November 13, 1997 (#97001420)	111 West First Street; 27°44′40″N 81°31′57″W	Frostproof	
57	Old Haines City National Guard Armory	Old Haines City National Guard Armory	March 2, 1994 (#94000158)	226 South 6th Street; 28°06′08″N 81°37′37″W	Haines City	Part of the Haines City MPS
58	Old Lakeland High School	Old Lakeland High School	September 30, 1993 (#93001027)	400 North Florida Avenue; 28°02′55″N 81°57′30″W	Lakeland	
59	Old Polk County Courthouse	Old Polk County Courthouse	August 7, 1989 (#89001055)	100 East Main Street; 27°53′48″N 81°50′35″W	Bartow	
60	Polk Hotel	Polk Hotel	March 17, 1994 (#94000151)	800-810 Hinson Avenue; 28°06′24″N 81°37′27″W	Haines City	Part of the Haines City MPS
61	Perry House	Perry House	January 19, 2022 (#100007366)	2208 Woodbine Ave. 28°01′02″N 81°57′08″W	Lakeland	
62	Polk Theatre and Office Building	Polk Theatre and Office Building	May 27, 1993 (#93000446)	121 South Florida Avenue; 28°02′35″N 81°57′28″W	Lakeland	
63	Pope Avenue Historic District	Pope Avenue Historic District	December 7, 2001 (#01001337)	Roughly Avenue A, NW., Pope Avenue, NW., and 6th and 7th Sts., NW. 28°01′29″N 81°44′03″W	Winter Haven	Part of the Winter Haven, Florida MPS
64	Roosevelt School	Roosevelt School	March 29, 2001 (#01000306)	115 East Street, N. 27°54′39″N 81°35′44″W	Lake Wales	
65	St. Mark's Episcopal Church	St. Mark's Episcopal Church	March 17, 1994 (#94000159)	102 North 9th Street; 28°06′29″N 81°37′30″W	Haines City	Part of the Haines City MPS
66	Shell Hammock Landing		August 26, 2019 (#100004350)	3800 Shell Hammock; 27°59′28″N 81°23′10″W	Lake Wales	
67	South Bartow Residential District	South Bartow Residential District	May 18, 1993 (#93000394)	Roughly bounded by Floral and First Avenues and Main and Vine Streets; 27°53′32″N 81°50′28″W	Bartow	Part of the Bartow MPS
68	South Florida Military College	South Florida Military College	July 24, 1972 (#72000349)	1100 South Broadway; 27°53′07″N 81°50′34″W	Bartow	
69	South Lake Morton Historic District	South Lake Morton Historic District	November 20, 1985 (#85002900)	Bounded by Lake Morton Drive and Palmetto Street, Ingraham and Johnson Avenues, McDonald and Balmar Streets, and Tennessee Avenue; 28°01′56″N 81°57′07″W	Lakeland	
70	Spook Hill	Spook Hill	April 5, 2019 (#100003585)	North Wales Dr. between Burns Ave. and Spook Hill Elementary; 27°54′43″N 81°34′56″W	Lake Wales	
71	Surveyor's Lake Schoolhouse		June 26, 2024 (#100008963)	8625 Sinkhole Rd; 27°49′33″N 81°42′28″W	Bartow vicinity	
72	John J. Swearingen House	John J. Swearingen House	May 13, 1982 (#82002379)	690 East Church Street; 27°53′52″N 81°50′10″W	Bartow	
73	Thompson and Company Cigar Factory	Thompson and Company Cigar Factory	August 9, 2002 (#02000838)	255 North Third Street; 27°53′52″N 81°50′00″W	Bartow	Part of the Bartow MPS
74	G. V. Tillman House	G. V. Tillman House	August 31, 1990 (#90001276)	301 East Sessoms Avenue; 27°54′18″N 81°35′07″W	Lake Wales	Part of the Lake Wales MPS
75	Winston School	Winston School	December 20, 2001 (#01001362)	3415 Swindell Road; 28°03′25″N 82°00′50″W	Lakeland	
76	Winter Haven Heights Historic Residential District	Winter Haven Heights Historic Residential District	June 15, 2000 (#00000660)	Roughly Lake Martha, 2nd Street, NE., 5th Street, NE., and Avenue A, NE. 28°01′27″N 81°43′22″W	Winter Haven	Part of the Winter Haven, Florida MPS
77	Woman's Club of Winter Haven	Woman's Club of Winter Haven	August 10, 1998 (#98000927)	660 Pope Avenue, Northwest; 28°01′29″N 81°44′06″W	Winter Haven	Part of the Clubhouses of Florida's Woman's Clubs MPS

== See also ==
- List of National Historic Landmarks in Florida
- National Register of Historic Places listings in Florida
