= Camp Mack =

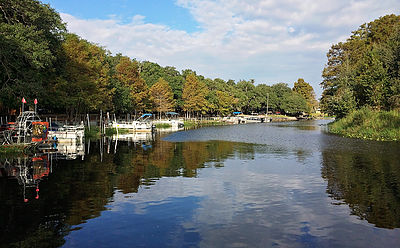
Riverfront at Camp Mack 2016

Camp Mack, formerly Tyson's Camp, is a fishing lodge, RV resort campground and recreation event venue in Lake Wales, Florida. In March 2018 the lodge was rebranded as Camp Mack. The camp offers access to Lake Kissimmee, Hatchineha, Cypress and Tohopekaliga and is host of numerous bass fishing tournaments. Camp Mack has been a 'fish camp' for well over 100 years. On a geological map from 1836, this area was described as Tyson's Camp.^{[3]}

In the 1980s RV sites were added^{[4]} and in 2006, the camp expanded to 225 RV sites and cabins and a 40 unit lodge was opened. The riverfront setting includes 85 boat slips, a major boat ramp and a general store standing for over 80 years. Other camp amenities include a guest clubhouse, swimming pool and a variety of food and beverage options. Adjoining Camp Mack is Lake Kissimmee State Park with over 13 miles of hiking/biking trails, 6 miles of equestrian trails and a destination along the Great Florida Birding & Wildlife trail.

Camp Mack has been featured on television shows related to fishing, including on ESPN during the 2005 Bassmasters Citgo Southern Open and on Sweetwater Fishing TV. The Bellamy Brothers filmed their Catahoula music video at Camp Mack and on Lake Kissimmee in 1997. Martin Glover's movie, The Lighthouse was filmed at Camp Mack's River Resort in 2012. Other notable recent events held at Camp Mack include the live broadcast of Trophy Takers Outdoor radio show hosted by Lee Cepero and the 5th annual Bobby Lane Cup, a youth fishing tournament held by Major League Fishing Pro Bobby Lane.

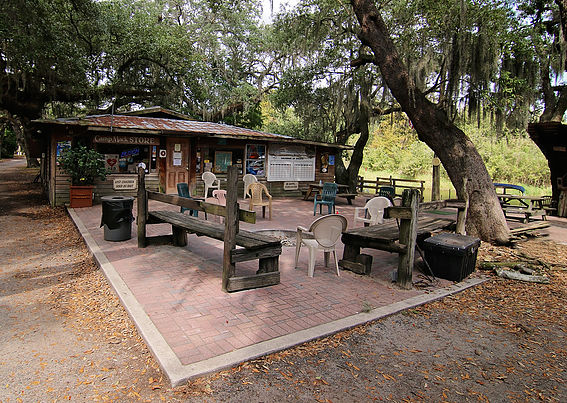
Camp Mack General Store

== See also ==
- Shell Hammock Landing
- National Register of Historic Places listings in Polk County, Florida
- LEGOLAND Florida
- Bok Tower Gardens
