= Winston School =

Winston School may refer to:

- Winston School (Lakeland, Florida), on the National Register of Historic Places
- The Winston School, a private coeducational day school in Dallas, Texas

== See also ==
- Winston Churchill High School (disambiguation)
