= L.B. Brown =

American businessman

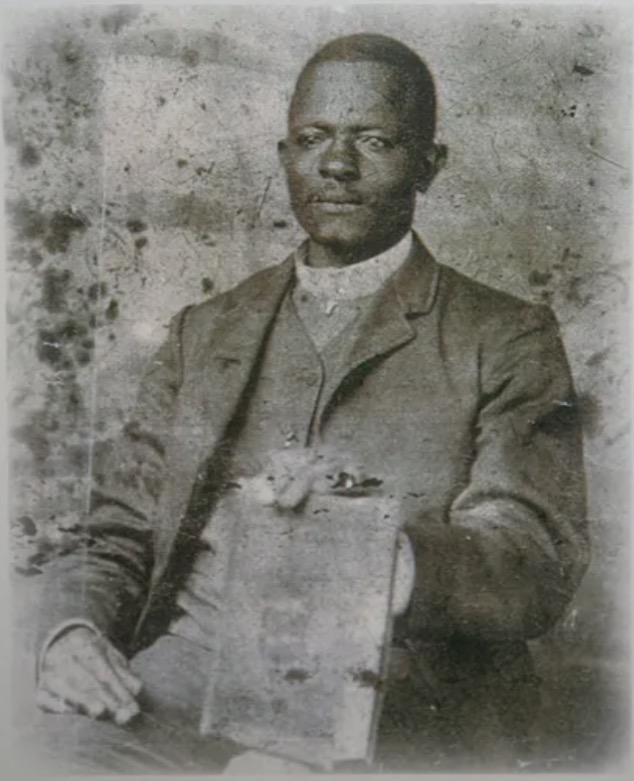
- Born: September 12, 1856; Wacahoota, Florida
- Died: June 16, 1941 (age 84) Bartow, Florida
- Occupations: Businessman and carpenter

Lawrence Bernard Brown (September 12, 1856 – June 16, 1941) was a self-made businessman, community leader, and master carpenter.

== Biography ==
Brown was born in Wacahoota, Florida the sixth of seven children by Peter (a "plantation minister") and Catherine Brown. Brown along with the rest of his family lived as enslaved peoples until slavery was abolished by the Thirteenth Amendment in 1865.

He died in Bartow, Florida in 1941.

== See also ==
- Lawrence Brown House
