= Lawrence Brown House =

Historic house in Florida, United States

- U.S. National Register of Historic Places
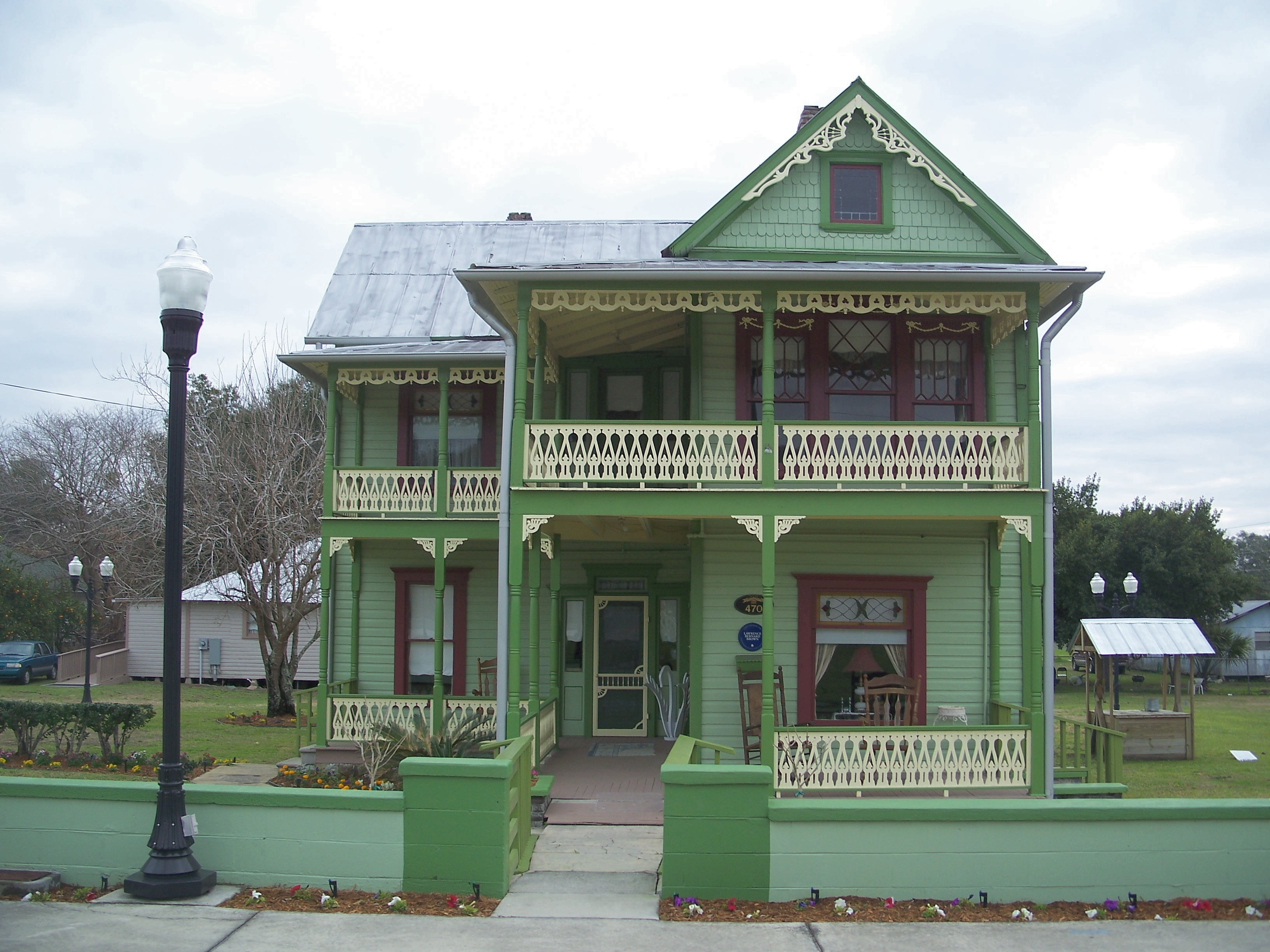

- Location within Florida Location within the United States
- Location: Bartow, Florida United States
- Coordinates: 27°53′36″N 81°50′3″W
- Architect: Lawrence Brown
- MPS: Bartow MPS
- NRHP reference No.: 00001594
- Added to NRHP: January 4, 2001

The Lawrence Brown House, better known as the L.B. Brown House, is the home built by Lawrence Bernard Brown a self-made businessman, community leader, and master carpenter in Bartow, Florida. It may be the only home built by a former enslaved person left in Florida. The house "stands as a living testimony to one person's triumph over adversity."

Until 1989, was known as the "Thomas House." It wasn't until the death of the former resident, Lavina Thomas, that the original builder was discovered.

The house is located at 470 L.B. Brown Avenue, Bartow, Florida 33830 (formerly 2nd Ave). Clifton Lewis, president of Corporation Of Neighborhood Improvement and other Bartow residents set about restoring old homes in the early 1990s. When Robert Brown, son of L.B., came to look at his childhood home, he casually mentioned to Lewis, his father had built the house. From that point on, it was known as the L.B. Brown Home and the street name was officially changed from 2nd Ave., to L.B. Brown Avenue.

The L.B. Brown House was added to the National Register of Historic Places, a division of the National Park Service, on January 4, 2001. The house was completed in 1892.

Every year the town of Bartow recognizes L.B. Brown's "life and achievements" at the annual L.B. Brown Festival, usually held mid-February.

The L.B. Brown house will be represented at the new National Museum of African American History and Culture. There will be cornerstone with L.B. Brown's name on it.

== See also ==
- Horace King (architect)
- Lincolnville Historic District
- National Register of Historic Places listings in Polk County, Florida
