= Lake Wales MPS =

- U.S. National Register of Historic Places
- Location within Florida Location within the United States
- Location: Lake Wales, Florida
- Coordinates: 27°54′17″N 81°35′3″W
- MPS: Lake Wales Multiple Property Listing
- NRHP reference No.: 64500115

The following buildings were added to the National Register of Historic Places as part of the Lake Wales MPS Multiple Property Submission (or MPS).

Resource Name	Also known as	Address	City	County	Added
Atlantic Coast Line Railroad Depot		325 South Scenic Highway	Lake Wales	Polk County	August 31, 1990
B. K. Bullard House		644 South Lakeshore Boulevard	Lake Wales	Polk County	August 31, 1990
Church of the Holy Spirit		1099 Hesperides Road	Lake Wales	Polk County	August 31, 1990
Dixie Walesbilt Hotel		115 North First Street	Lake Wales	Polk County	August 31, 1990
First Baptist Church		338 East Central Avenue	Lake Wales	Polk County	August 31, 1990
Lake Wales City Hall		152 East Central Avenue	Lake Wales	Polk County	August 31, 1990
Lake Wales Commercial Historic District		Roughly bounded by Scenic Highway, Central Avenue, Market Street, and Orange Avenue	Lake Wales	Polk County	May 10, 1990
G. V. Tillman House		301 East Sessoms Avenue	Lake Wales	Polk County	August 31, 1990
