= Shell Hammock Landing =

Shell Hammock Landing is a historic former boarding house and steamship dock in Polk County, Florida by an oxbow on the Kissimmee River in Florida. It is listed on the National Register of Historic Places. The two-story former boarding house is wood frame construction and considered an example of Florida cracker architecture. The site was developed prior to Florida's road system when travel by steamship was common. It served visitors who could hunt or fish in the area.

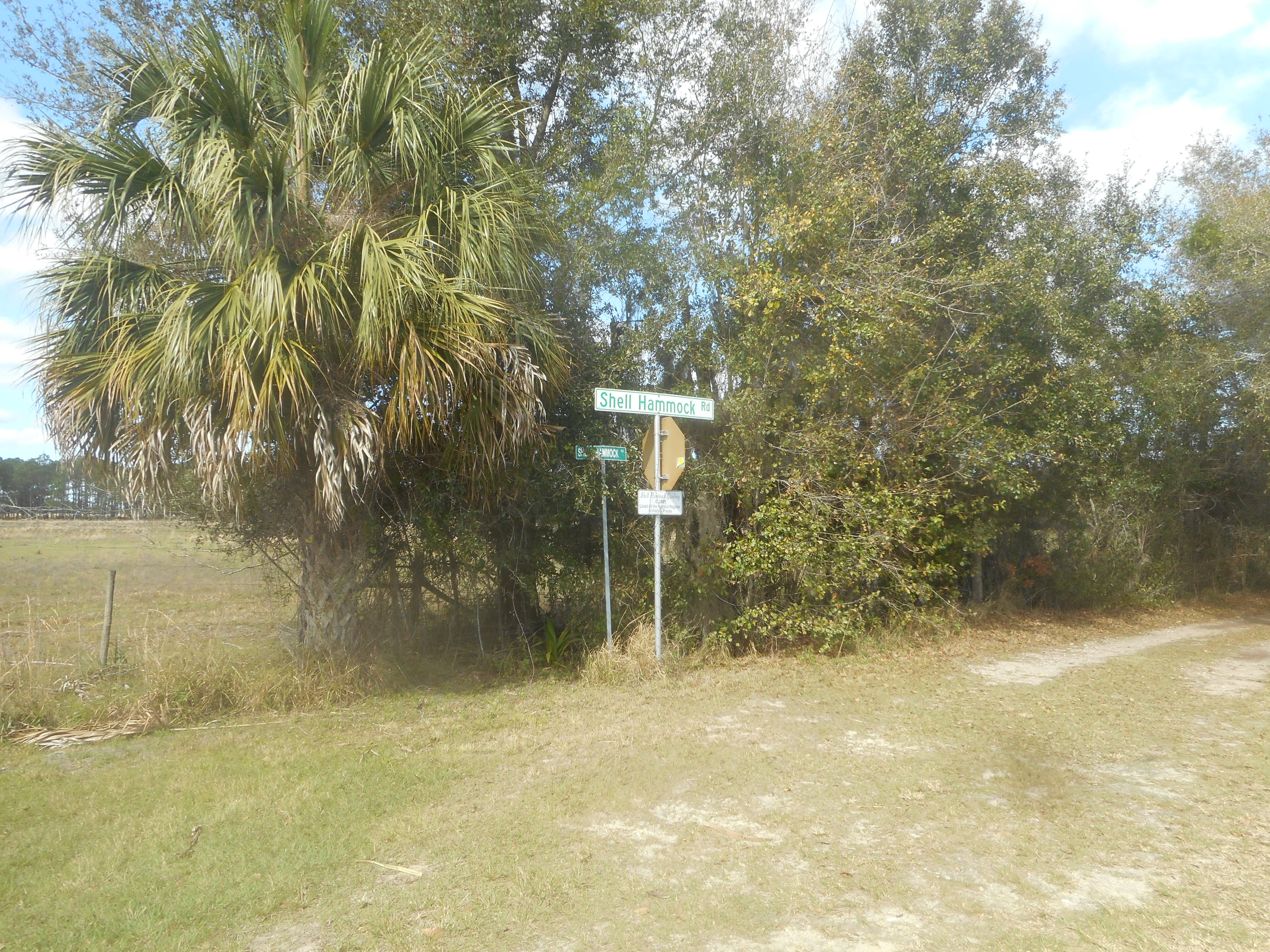
Sign for Shell Hammock Road

It was in operation from 1881 to 1921. The property has had several owners. The property is near Guy Harvey's Camp Mack.

== See also ==
- National Register of Historic Places listings in Polk County, Florida
- Plant System
