= Bartow Multiple Property Submission =

- U.S. National Register of Historic Places
- Location within Florida Location within the United States
- Location: Bartow, Florida
- Coordinates: 27°53′N 81°50′W
- MPS: Architectural Resources of Bartow, Florida
- NRHP reference No.: 64500096

The following buildings in Bartow were added to the National Register of Historic Places as part of the Bartow Multiple Property Submission (or MPS).

| Resource Name | Also known as | Address | Added |
|---|---|---|---|
| Bartow Downtown Commercial District | | roughly bounded by Davidson and Summerlin Streets and Broadway and Florida Avenues | May 18, 1993 |
| Northeast Bartow Residential District | | roughly bounded by Jackson and 1st Avenues and by Church and Boulevard Streets | May 18, 1993 |
| South Bartow Residential District | | roughly bounded by Floral and 1st Avenues and Main and Vine Streets | May 18, 1993 |
| Lawrence Brown House | | 470 2nd Avenue | January 4, 2001 |
| Thompson and Company Cigar Factory | Cuban American Corporation Cigar Factory | 255 North 3rd Street | August 9, 2002 |
| Oak Hill Cemetery | | West Parker Street | February 12, 2003 |
