= Lake Wales station =

- Atlantic Coast Line Railroad Depot
- U.S. National Register of Historic Places
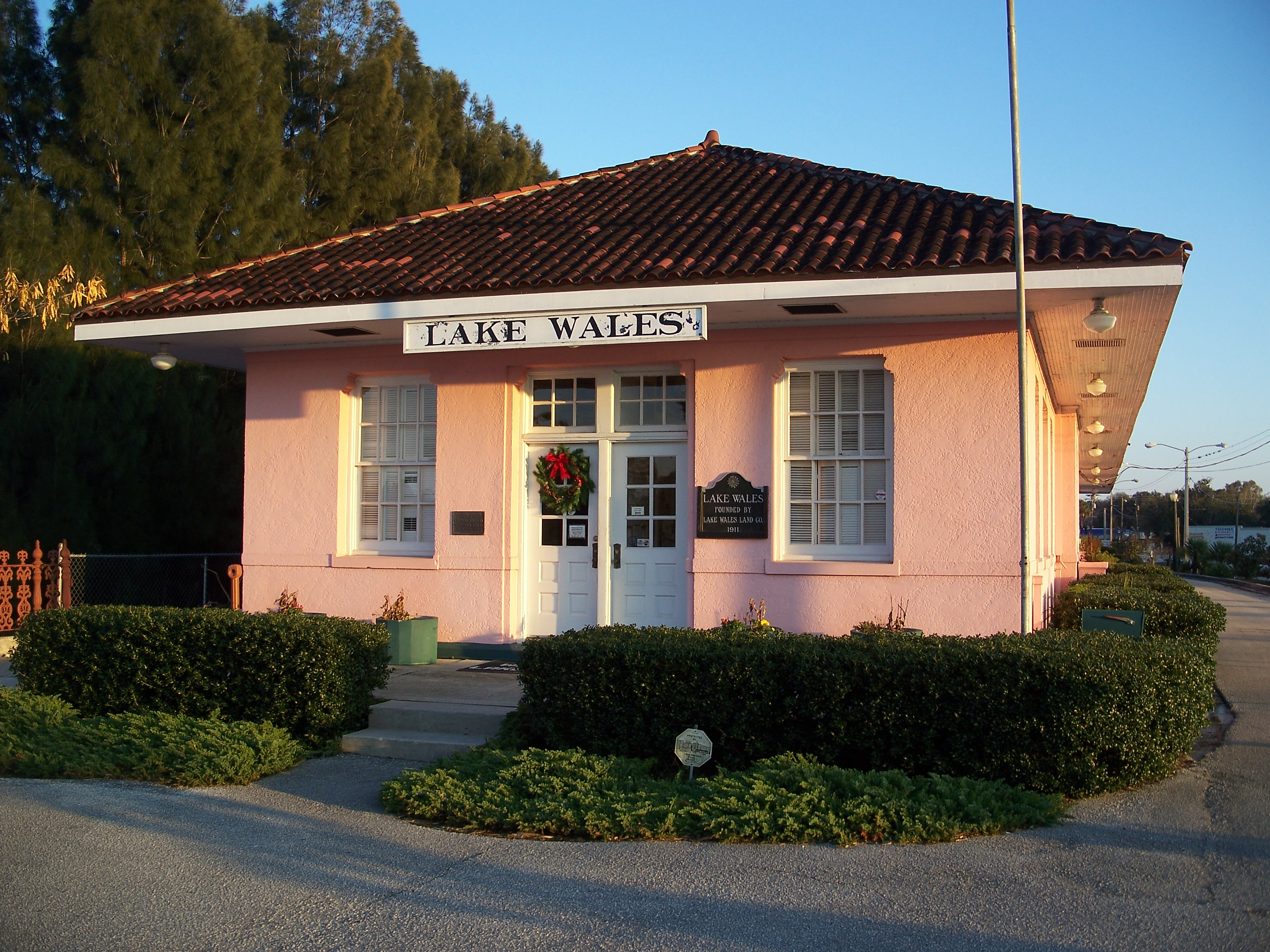

- Location within Florida Location within the United States
- Location: 325 South Scenic Highway Lake Wales, Florida
- Coordinates: 27°53′49″N 81°35′01″W
- Built: 1928
- Architect: R.W. Burrows Construction Company
- Architectural style: Mediterranean Revival
- MPS: Lake Wales MPS
- NRHP reference No.: 90001277
- Added to NRHP: August 31, 1990

The Atlantic Coast Line Railroad Station was an Atlantic Coast Line Railroad station in Lake Wales, Florida. On August 31, 1990, it was added to the U.S. National Register of Historic Places. The building is now used by the Lake Wales History Museum.

== History ==
It was built as a passenger station by the Atlantic Coast Line Railroad and R.W. Burrows Construction Company in 1928 at an approximate cost of $51,000. Replacing service at the original depot, the new location was chosen to relieve traffic congestion in the downtown area. A freight room and loading platform were added in 1938.

Passenger service to Lake Wales ceased in 1954.The station continued to handle freight, which had provided the bulk of its cargo since the 1930s, until 1974 when freight service shifted to the West Lake Wales station, and trains no longer stopped at the Lake Wales depot.

=== Conversion to Museum ===
Spearheaded by the Bicentennial Commission, efforts began in 1974 to convert the empty building into a museum and cultural arts center for the citizens of Lake Wales.

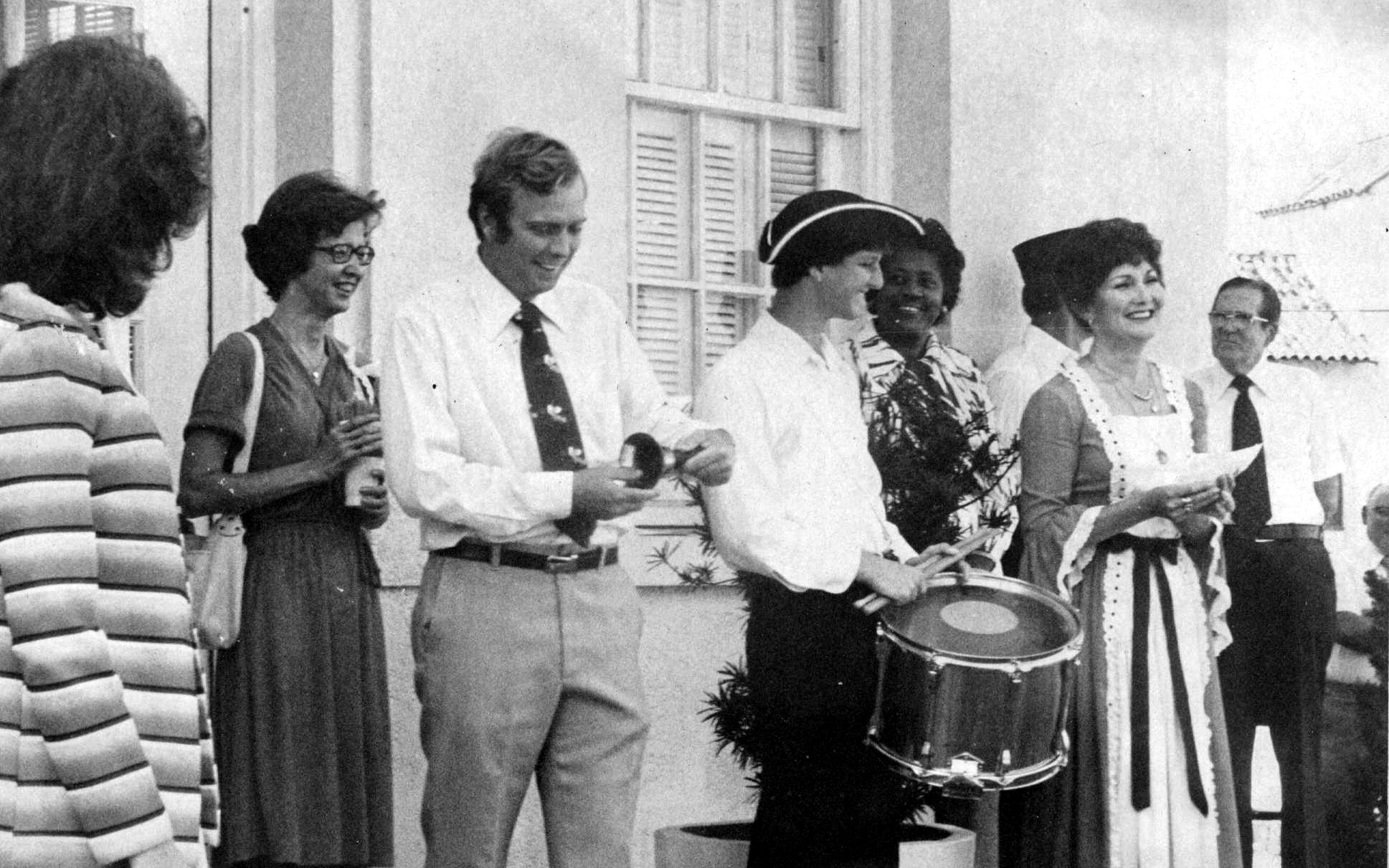
Depot Museum Dedication

In 1976, Atlantic Coast Line Railroad Station opened as the Lake Wales Depot Museum. Now named the Lake Wales History Museum, the museum is operated by the Lake Wales History Museum, Inc. with the support of the City of Lake Wales. A model railroad layout is one of the exhibits on display.

== Architecture ==
The one-story masonry building exhibits elements of the Mediterranean Revival Style that characterized architectural design in Florida during the 1920s. The building was constructed of hollow tile, its exterior walls covered with smooth stucco, and its hip roof with boxed eaves and barrel tile surfacing. A brick chimney with an arched hood projects from the center of the roof ridge. Cross-gable extensions with curvilinear parapet ends extend from the east and west sides. The east side gable extension has a round arch entrance with a fanlight, which leads into the waiting room. The west side extension has a pair of round-arch double-hung sash windows.

The exterior of the building retains its original appearance, altered only by the addition of a freight room in 1938. Some interior modifications occurred during the station's conversion to a museum in the mid-1970s. The original ticket window may still be found in place on the east wall of the passenger waiting room. The freight room located in the rear section of the building has suffered little alteration. Notable features of the freight room include the original Y-bracket support columns, exposed ceiling beams, and plank flooring.

Preceding station	Atlantic Coast Line Railroad	Following station
Mountain Lake toward Haines City	Haines City – Everglades City	Highland Park toward Everglades City
