= North Avenue Historic District =

Historic district in Florida, United States

- U.S. National Register of Historic Places
- U.S. Historic district
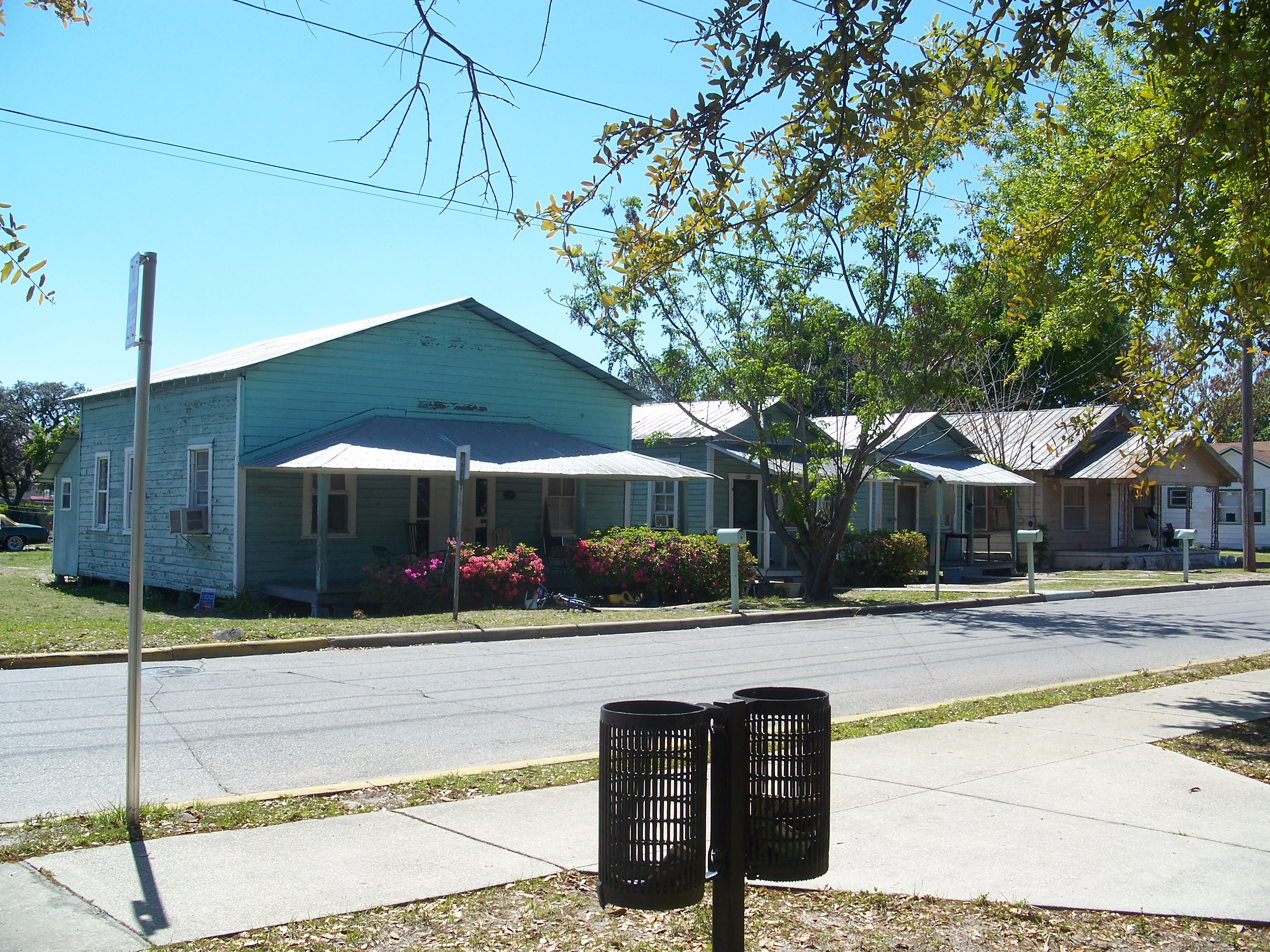

- Location within Florida Location within the United States
- Location: Lake Wales, Florida
- Coordinates: 27°54′35″N 81°35′28″W
- Area: 90 acres (0.36 km^{2})
- NRHP reference No.: 01001086
- Added to NRHP: October 12, 2001

The North Avenue Historic District is a U.S. historic district (designated as such on October 12, 2001) located in Lake Wales, Florida. The district is along the 100 Block of North Avenue. It contains 12 historic buildings.
