= First Baptist Church (Lake Wales, Florida) =

Historic church in Florida, United States

- U.S. National Register of Historic Places
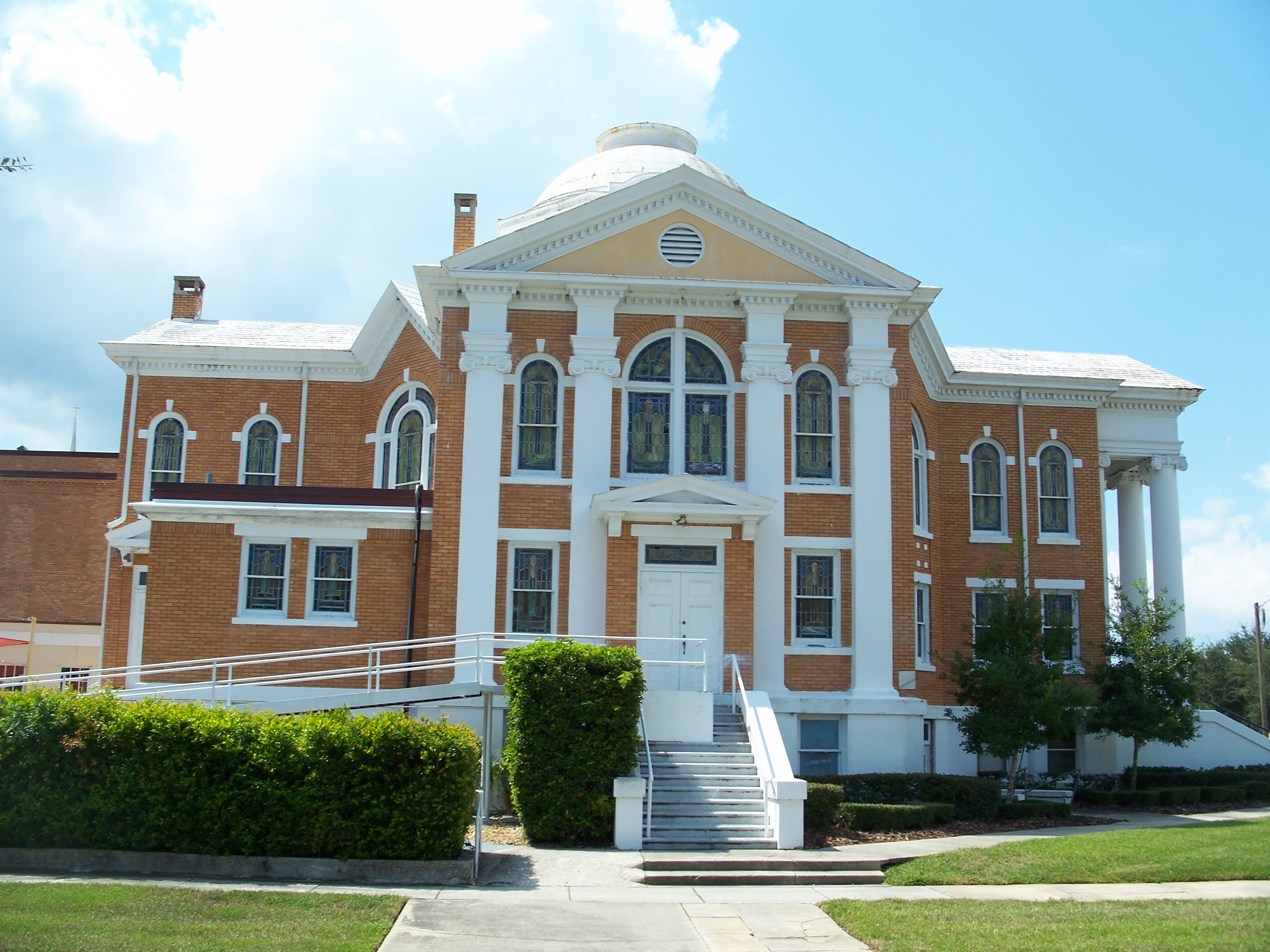
- A photo of the historic building on campus.

- Location within Florida Location within the United States
- Location: Lake Wales, Florida
- Coordinates: 27°54′2″N 81°35′1″W
- Architectural style: Classical Revival
- MPS: Lake Wales MPS
- NRHP reference No.: 90001275
- Added to NRHP: August 31, 1990

The First Baptist Church is a historic Southern Baptist church in Lake Wales, Florida. It is located at 338 East Central Avenue. On August 31, 1990, it was added to the U.S. National Register of Historic Places.
