= Oak Hill Cemetery (Bartow, Florida) =

Historic site in Polk County, Florida, US

- U.S. National Register of Historic Places
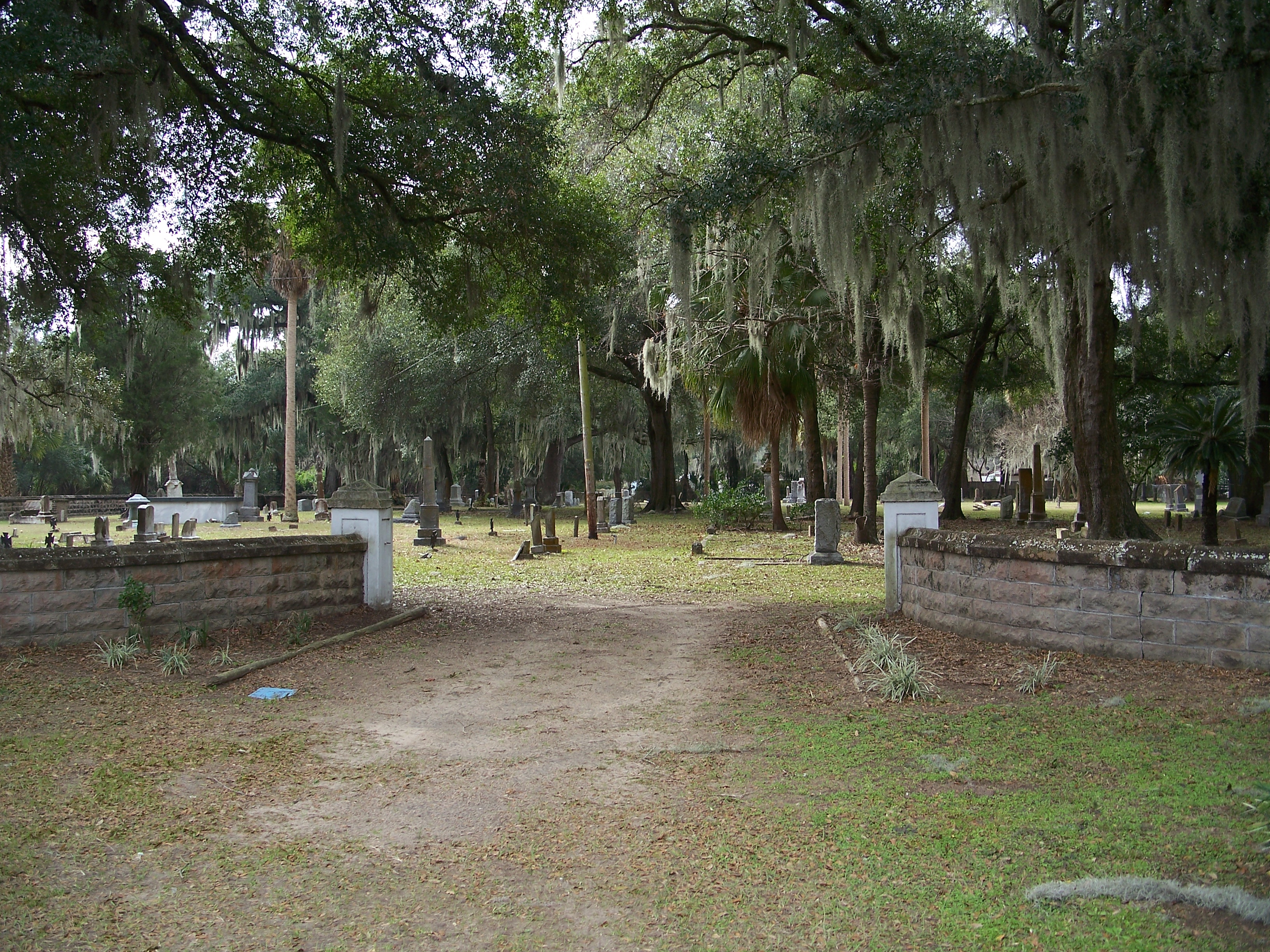

- Location within Florida Location within the United States
- Location: Bartow, Polk County, Florida
- Coordinates: 27°53′37″N 81°50′51″W
- MPS: Bartow MPS
- NRHP reference No.: 03000006
- Added to NRHP: February 12, 2003

The Oak Hill Cemetery is a historic cemetery in Bartow, Florida. It is located on West Parker Street. On February 12, 2003, it was added to the U.S. National Register of Historic Places. People interred there include Confederate General Evander M. Law.
