= Wacahoota, Florida =

Unincorporated community in Florida, US

Coordinates: 29°33′24″N 82°23′27″W

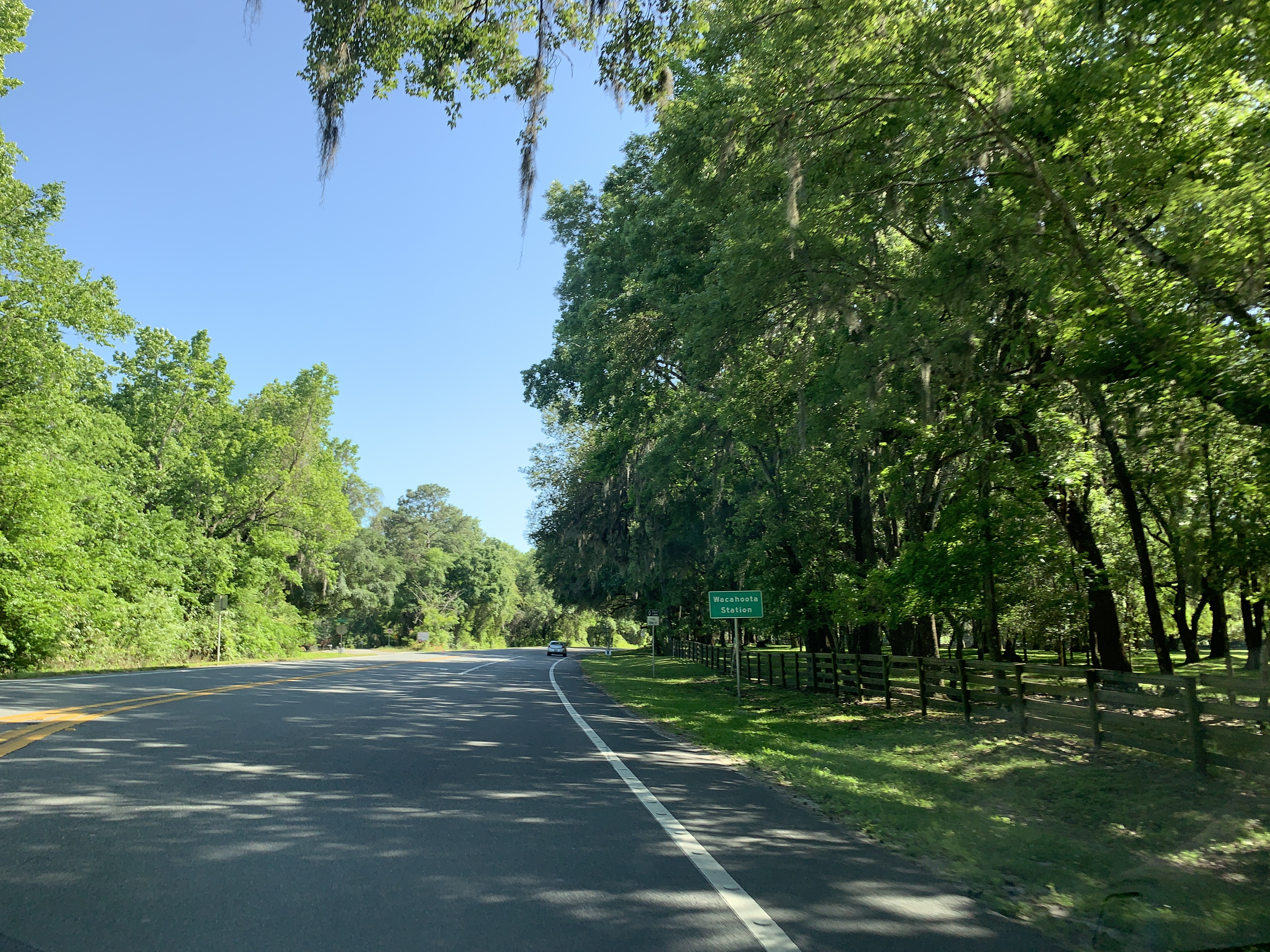
Wacahoota, April 2021

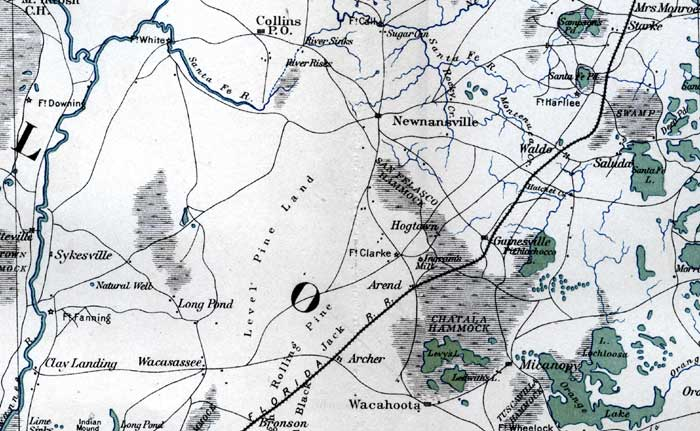
1865 map showing the location of Wacahoota on the south side of Alachua County between Archer and Micanopy (center bottom of the map)

Wacahoota, Florida is an unincorporated community in Alachua, Levy, and Marion counties, Florida, United States.

== History ==
The name "Wacahoota", spelled Wacahootee or Wacahootie on early 19th century maps, is believed to derive from a combination of Spanish vaca, "cow", and Muscogee hute or hoti, "cowpen". The Seminoles living around Payne's Prairie in the 18th and early 19th centuries owned large herds of cattle, and Wacahoota was likely the site of one or more cowpens used by them.

Wacahoota was associated in the 1830s with a location known as "Bowlegs' Old Plantation", in present-day Levy County. Bowlegs Old Plantation is presumed to have been earlier occupied by Billy Bowlegs's band of Seminoles.

Wacahoota was one of the two most populous places in Marion County when it was created in 1844, having been settled by planters from South Carolina after Florida was transferred from Spain to the U.S. The Wacahoota train station was in Alachua County.

A post office named "Wacahootee" was established in 1842 in what soon became Marion County. It closed in 1869, was reopened in 1873 and closed again in 1877. A post office named "Wacahoota" was established in Alachua County in 1895, closing in 1907.
