= Church of the Holy Spirit (Lake Wales, Florida) =

Historic church in Florida, United States

- U.S. National Register of Historic Places
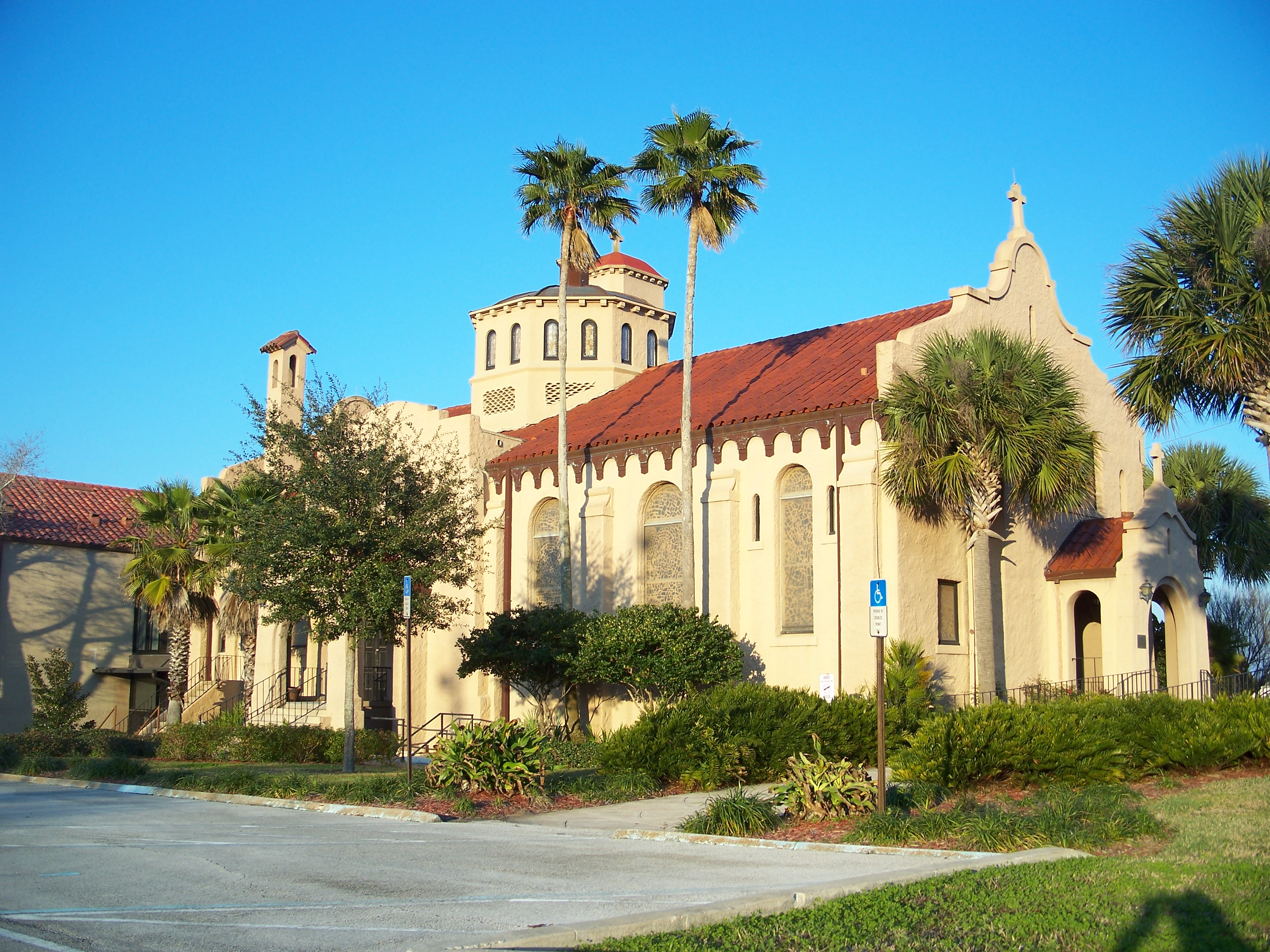

- Location within Florida Location within the United States
- Location: Lake Wales, Florida
- Coordinates: 27°53′38″N 81°33′54″W
- Built: 1927
- Architect: P.C. Samuell; R.W. Burrows
- Architectural style: Mission/Spanish Revival
- MPS: Lake Wales MPS
- NRHP reference No.: 90001271
- Added to NRHP: August 31, 1990

The former Church of the Holy Spirit is an historic Roman Catholic church building located at 1099 Hesperides Road in Lake Wales, Florida, United States. In 1989 it was sold by the local Catholic diocese to the City of Lake Wales. It is now the Lake Wales Cultural Center.

On August 31, 1990, it was added to the U.S. National Register of Historic Places.
