= Lake of the Hills Community Club =

- U.S. National Register of Historic Places
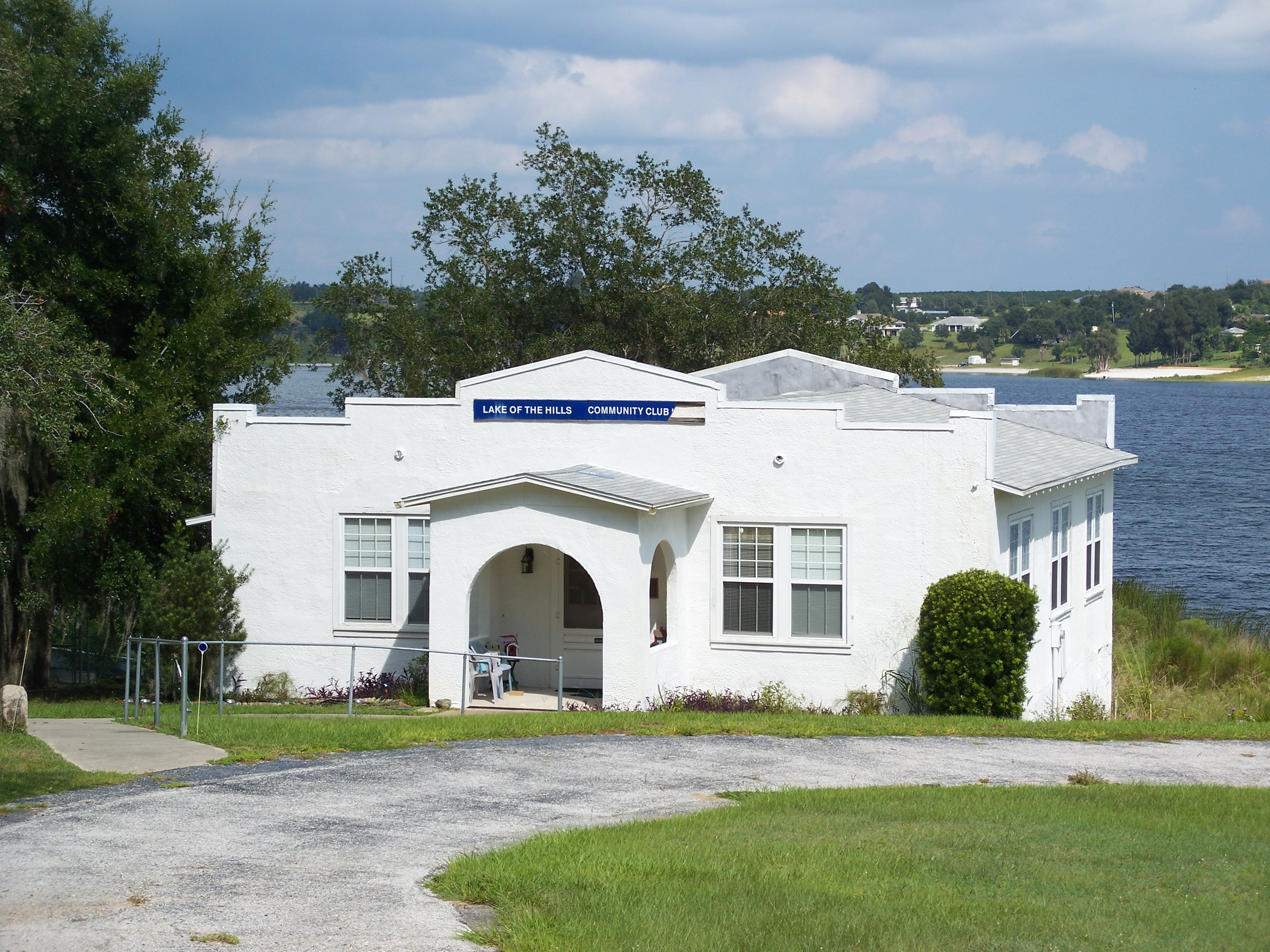

- Location within Florida Location within the United States
- Location: Lake Wales, Florida, US
- Coordinates: 27°57′19″N 81°35′35″W
- NRHP reference No.: 00000265
- Added to NRHP: March 24, 2000

The Lake of the Hills Community Club is a historic site in Lake Wales, Florida, United States. It is located at 47 East Starr Avenue. On March 24, 2000, it was added to the National Register of Historic Places.

== History ==
In 1914, a plot of land (approx 2 acres) was set aside by an early land developer in Polk county, by the name of W. J. Howey, who through his land company purchased several hundred acres around Starr Lake and beyond, which he platted for home-site development. The railroad was well established and utilized by many wealth patrons who established a winter community known as Mountain Lake estates, upon which the famous Bok Tower carillon was built. Howey visualised that many wealthy northerners would likewise purchase his platted acreage (most were platted as 6-acre sites). He was mindful that this community would need common acreage for a recreational community site.

Located on the northwestern-most corner of Starr lake the "Club" was officially designated in 1904, and in 1927 the Club House was constructed by the local residents, using their talents and money. Coincidentally, the construction and dedication coincided that of Bok Tower and Gardens which was presided over by then President Calvin Coolidge. Originally, the Club was only for the use of owners of a Howey land plot, but as a precursor to National Registration participation, membership was thrown open to the general public. Over 400 persons, including most local dignitaries and public officials, attended the "100th Centennial Celebration" held in 2014 where the name of the "Club" was changed to Lake Of The Hills Community Center.

Lake of the Hills C. C. is a Florida Not-For-Profit Corporation administered by an Executive Committee and a Board of Directors. The land and the structures on it are held by a Board of Trustees. While events are open to the public, members pay nominal, annual dues. Two major fundraisers are held annually to aid in support of those free public events, which occur several times annually. The first is the "Ice Cream Social" held in early October, and, the second, participation in the annual "39 Mile Ridge Scenic Highway Yard Sale". Members participate in "Monthly" (in season) Pot-Luck dinners, which are open to the public for a door fee of $3.00 per person. Free Movie night occurs monthly on a Friday. The clubhouse, surrounded on three sides by windows and backing onto Starr Lake, may be rented for events.

== Source ==
Info.provided by Edward V. Esteve, member since 2004, and former director and trustee.
