= G. V. Tillman House =

Historic house in Florida, United States

- U.S. National Register of Historic Places
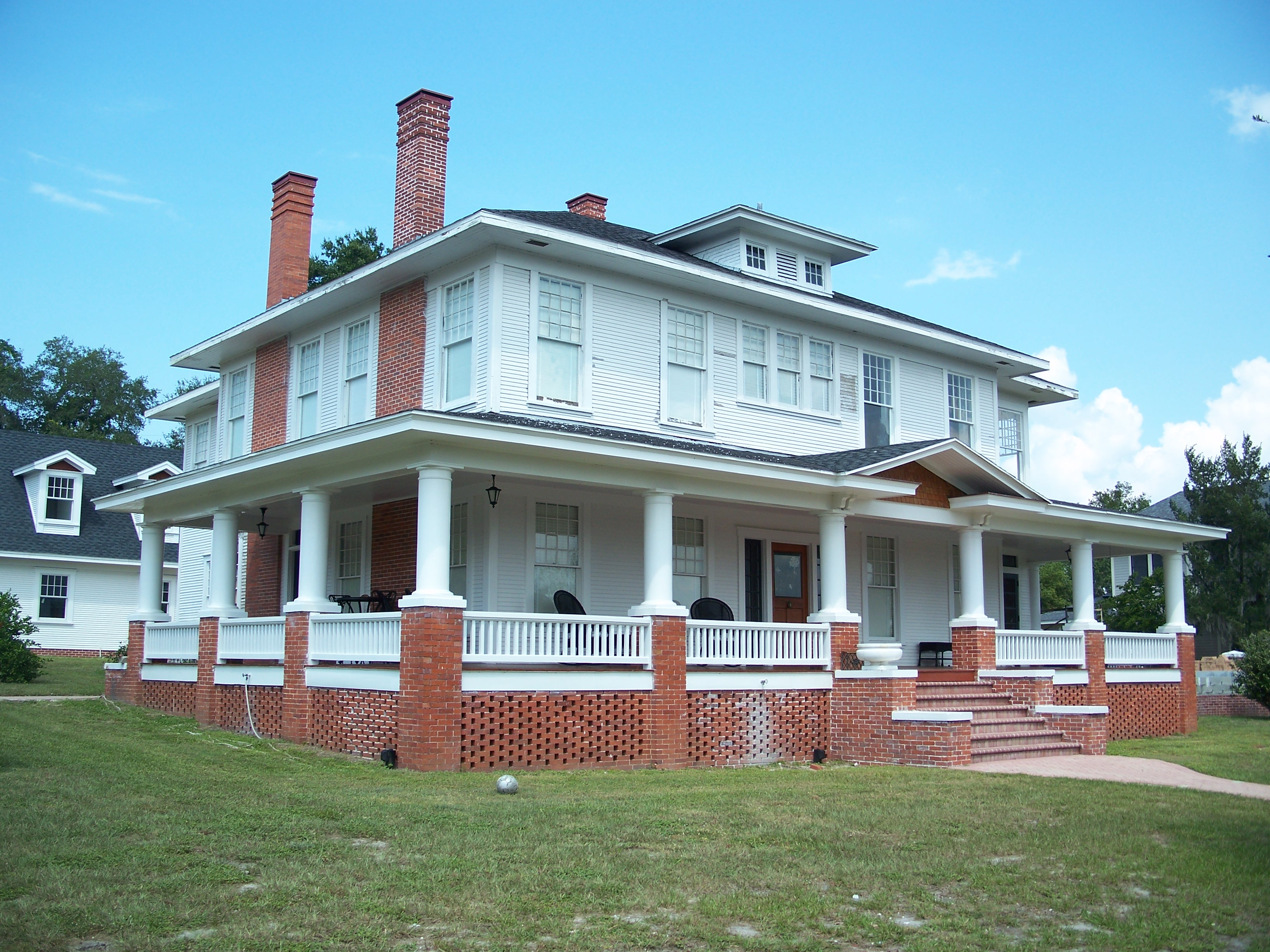

- Location within Florida Location within the United States
- Location: Lake Wales, Florida
- Coordinates: 27°54′18″N 81°35′7″W
- Architectural style: Colonial Revival
- MPS: Lake Wales MPS
- NRHP reference No.: 90001276
- Added to NRHP: August 31, 1990

The G. V. Tillman House is a historic home in Lake Wales, Florida. It is located at 301 East Sessoms Avenue. On August 31, 1990, it was added to the U.S. National Register of Historic Places.
