= Mann Manor =

- U.S. National Register of Historic Places
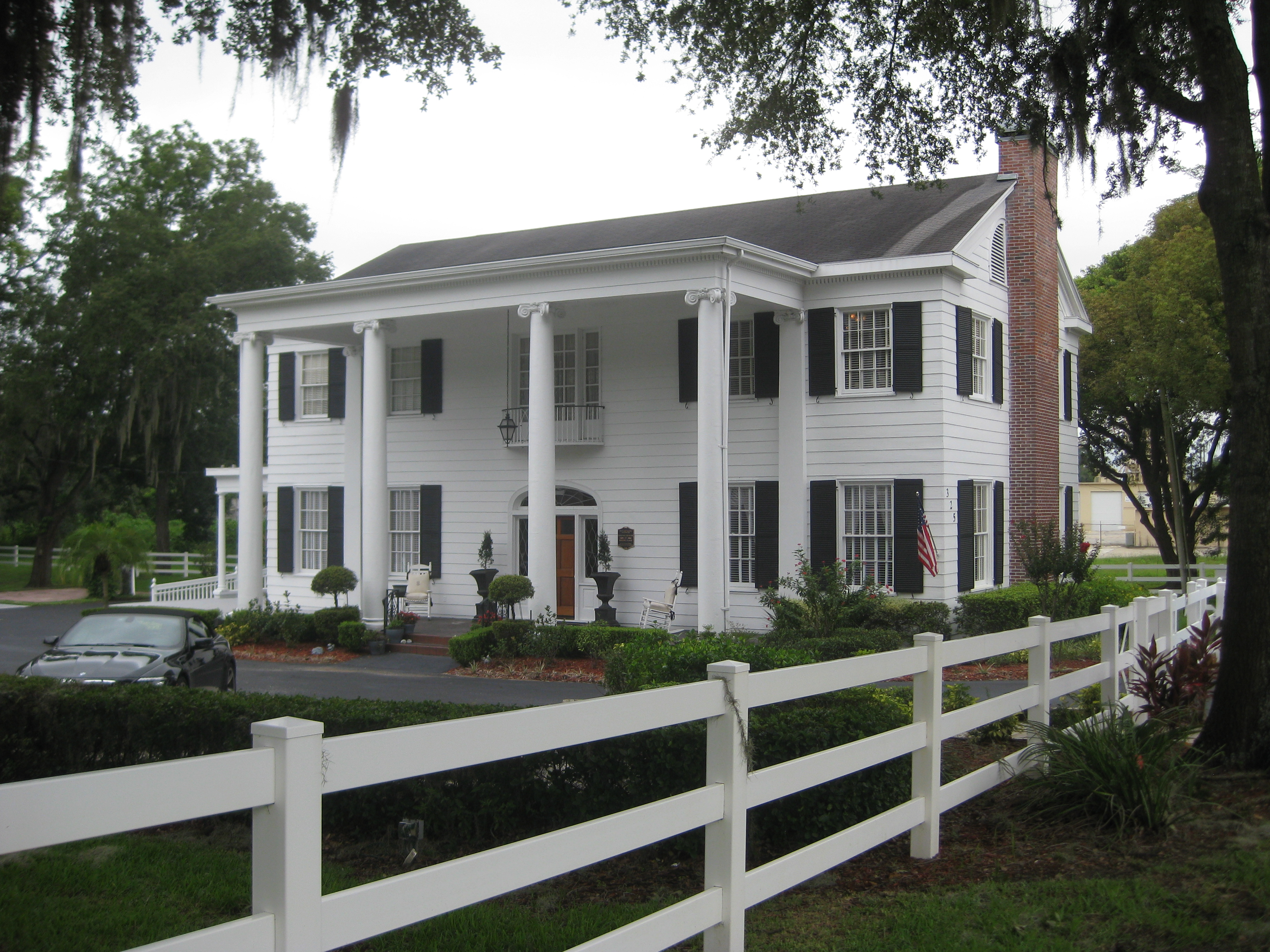

- Location within Florida Location within the United States
- Location: Bartow, Florida
- Coordinates: 27°53′47″N 81°50′44″W
- NRHP reference No.: 11000718
- Added to NRHP: October 13, 2011

Mann Manor is a national historic site located at 325 West Main Street, Bartow, Florida in Polk County.

It was added to the National Register of Historic Places on October 13, 2011.

As of 2023 it was being used as a law office.
