= W. Henry Lewis House =

- U.S. National Register of Historic Places
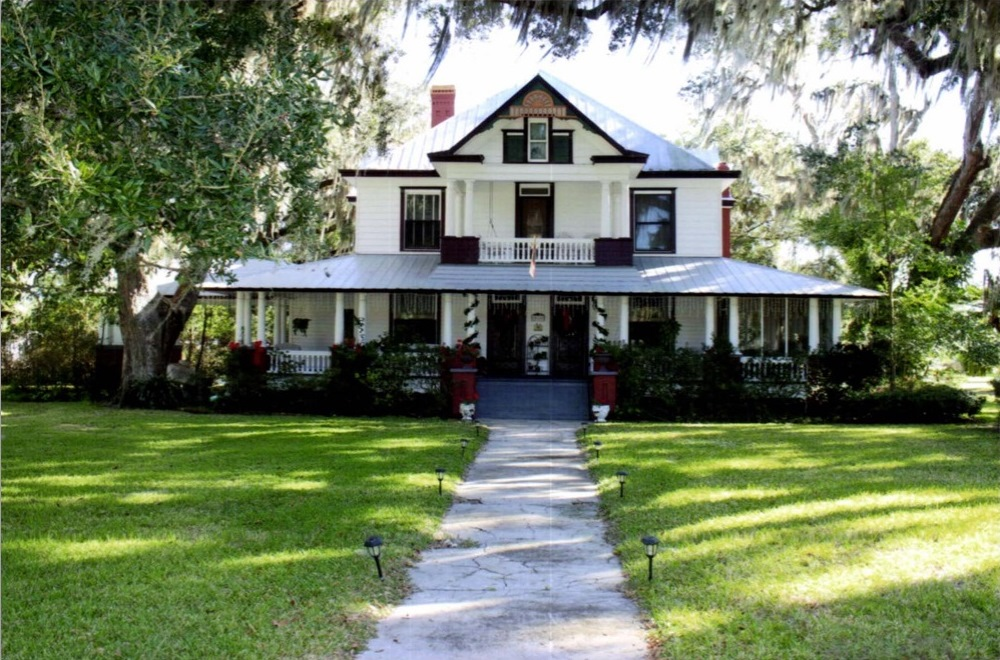

- Location within Florida Location within the United States
- Location: Fort Meade, Florida
- Coordinates: 27°45′26″N 81°47′50″W
- NRHP reference No.: 12000791
- Added to NRHP: September 19, 2012

W. Henry Lewis House is a national historic site located at 424 North Oak Street, Fort Meade, Florida in Polk County. It is a two-story wooden Queen Anne style home, built in 1901.

It was added to the National Register of Historic Places on September 19, 2012.
