= B. K. Bullard House =

Historic house in Florida, United States

- U.S. National Register of Historic Places
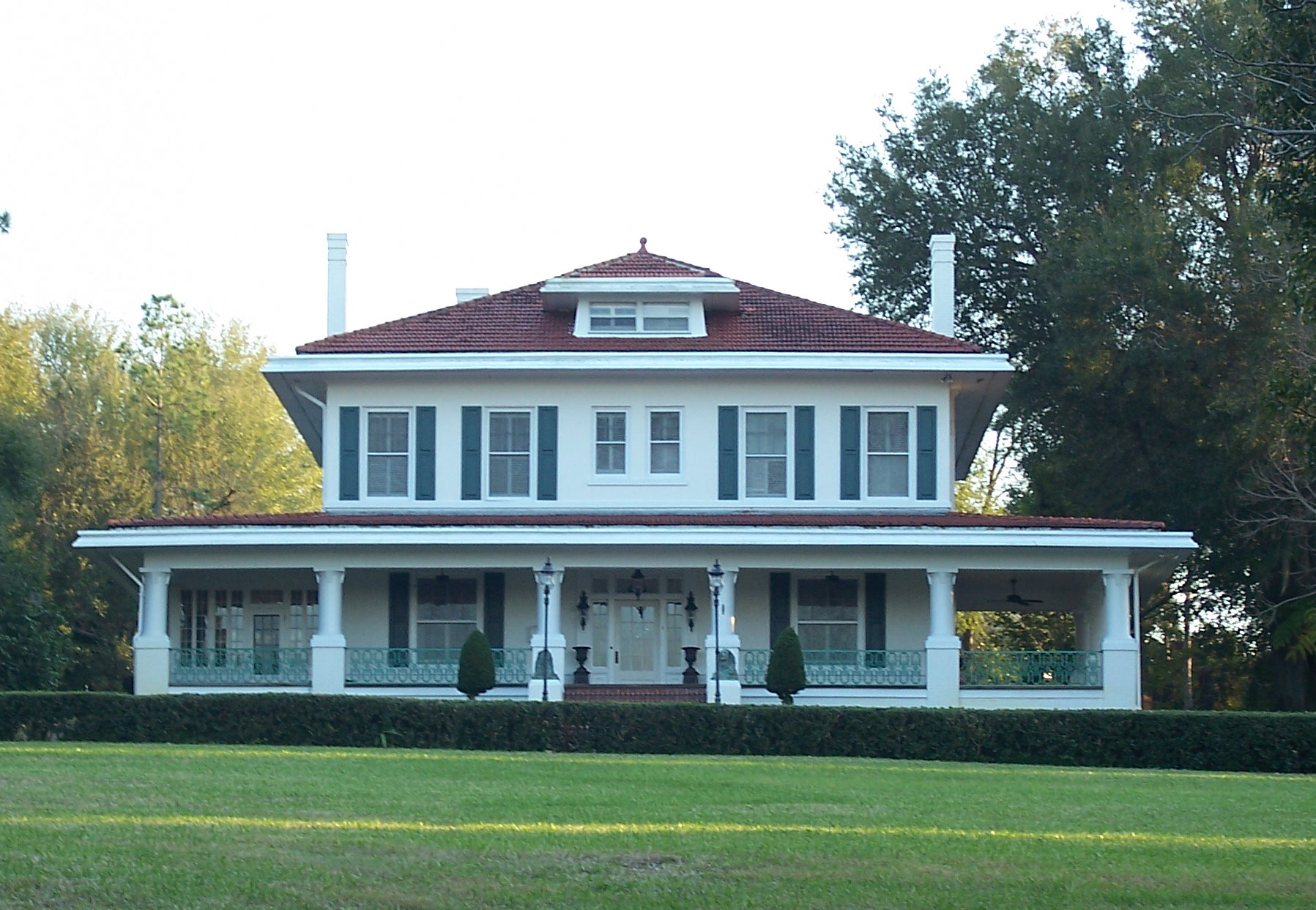

- Location within Florida Location within the United States
- Location: Lake Wales, Florida
- Coordinates: 27°53′41″N 81°34′40″W
- Built: 1914
- Architectural style: Colonial Revival
- MPS: Lake Wales MPS
- NRHP reference No.: 90001272
- Added to NRHP: August 31, 1990

The B. K. Bullard House is a historic house located at 644 South Lakeshore Boulevard in Lake Wales, Florida.

== Description and history ==
The B.K. Bullard House is a two-story brick residential building located on a large, sloping lot overlooking Lake Wales. The lot is landscaped with palm sand shrubbery throughout. The building has a low-pitched hipped roof with boxed eaves and a central hipped dormer. The roof is covered with ceramic tile.

It was added to the National Register of Historic Places on August 31, 1990.
