= Davenport Historic District =

Historic district in Florida, United States

- U.S. National Register of Historic Places
- U.S. Historic district
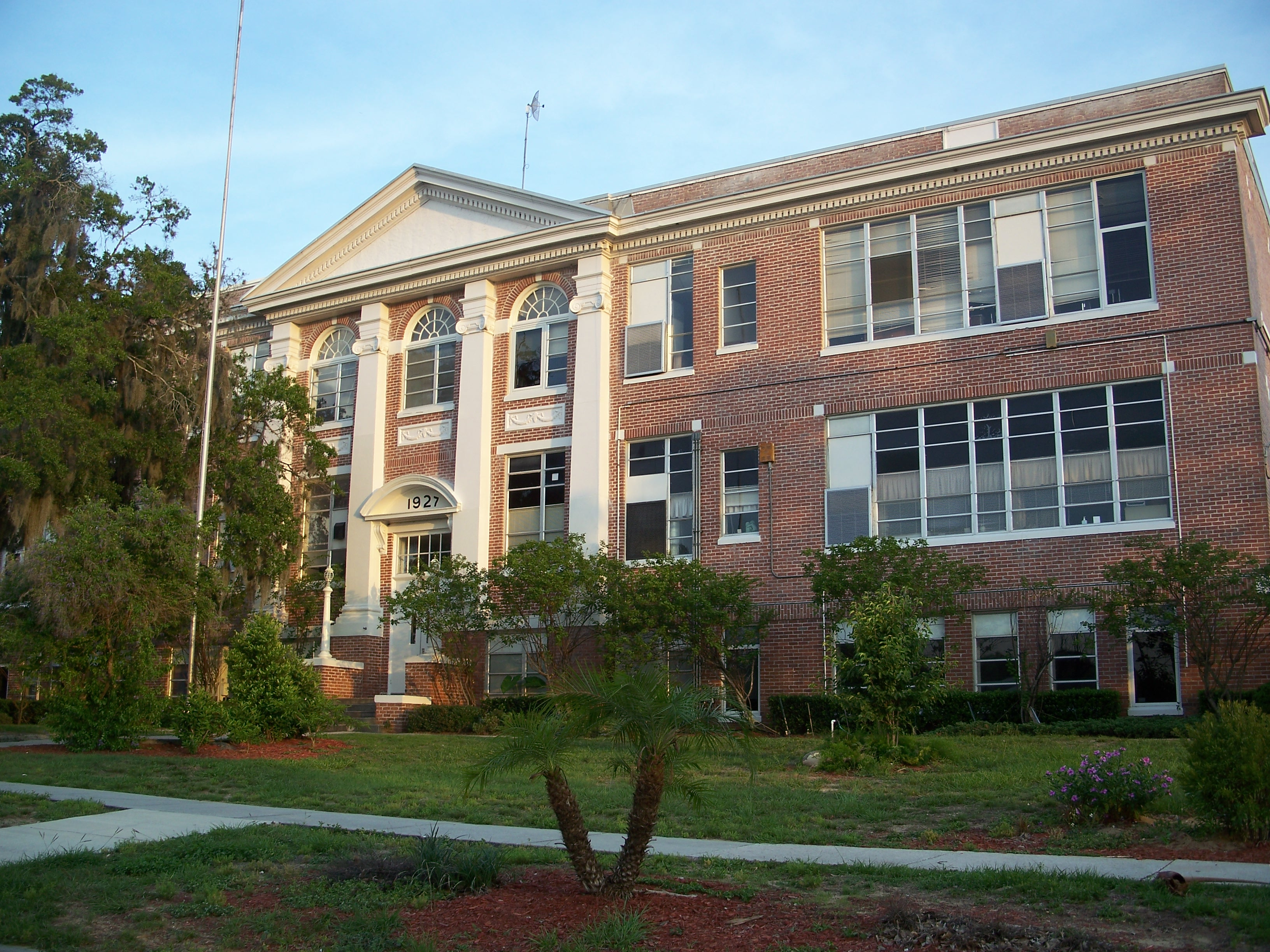
- Old elementary school

- Location within Florida Location within the United States
- Location: Davenport, Florida
- Coordinates: 28°9′28″N 81°36′9″W
- Area: 320 acres (1.3 km^{2})
- NRHP reference No.: 97000894
- Added to NRHP: August 15, 1997

The Davenport Historic District is a U.S. historic district (designated as such on August 15, 1997) located in Davenport, Florida. The district is bounded by Suwannee and Orange Avenues, Palmento Street, and West Boulevard. It contains 28 historic buildings and 1 structure.

== Gallery ==
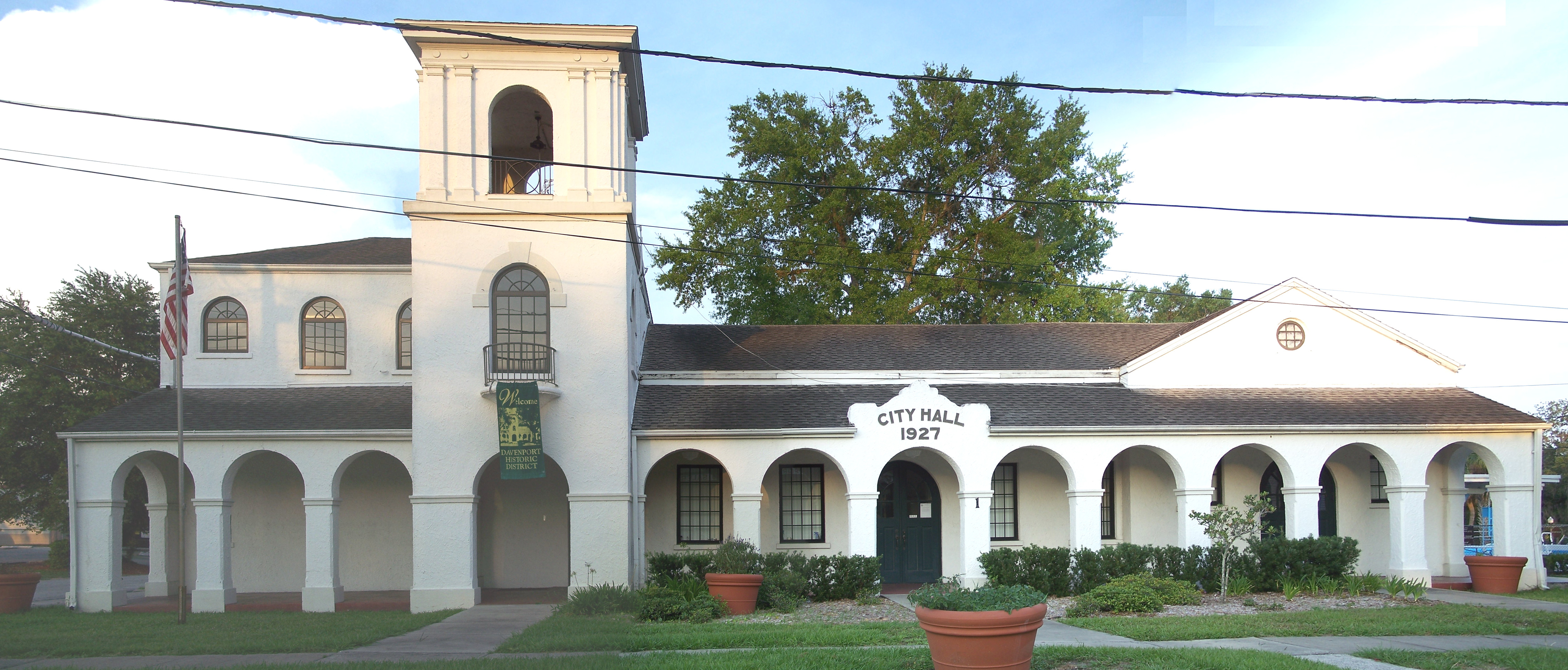
City hall

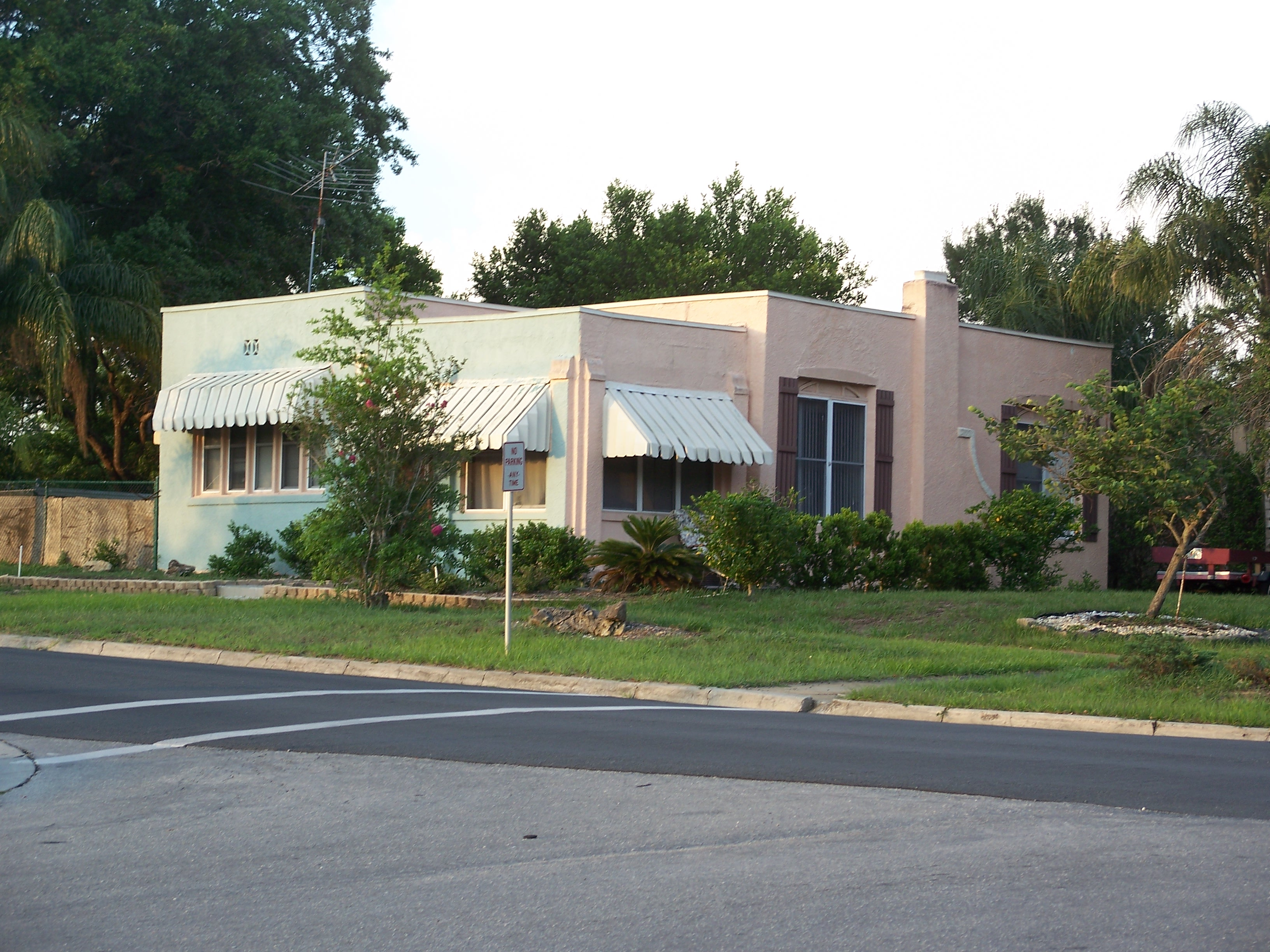
House in the district

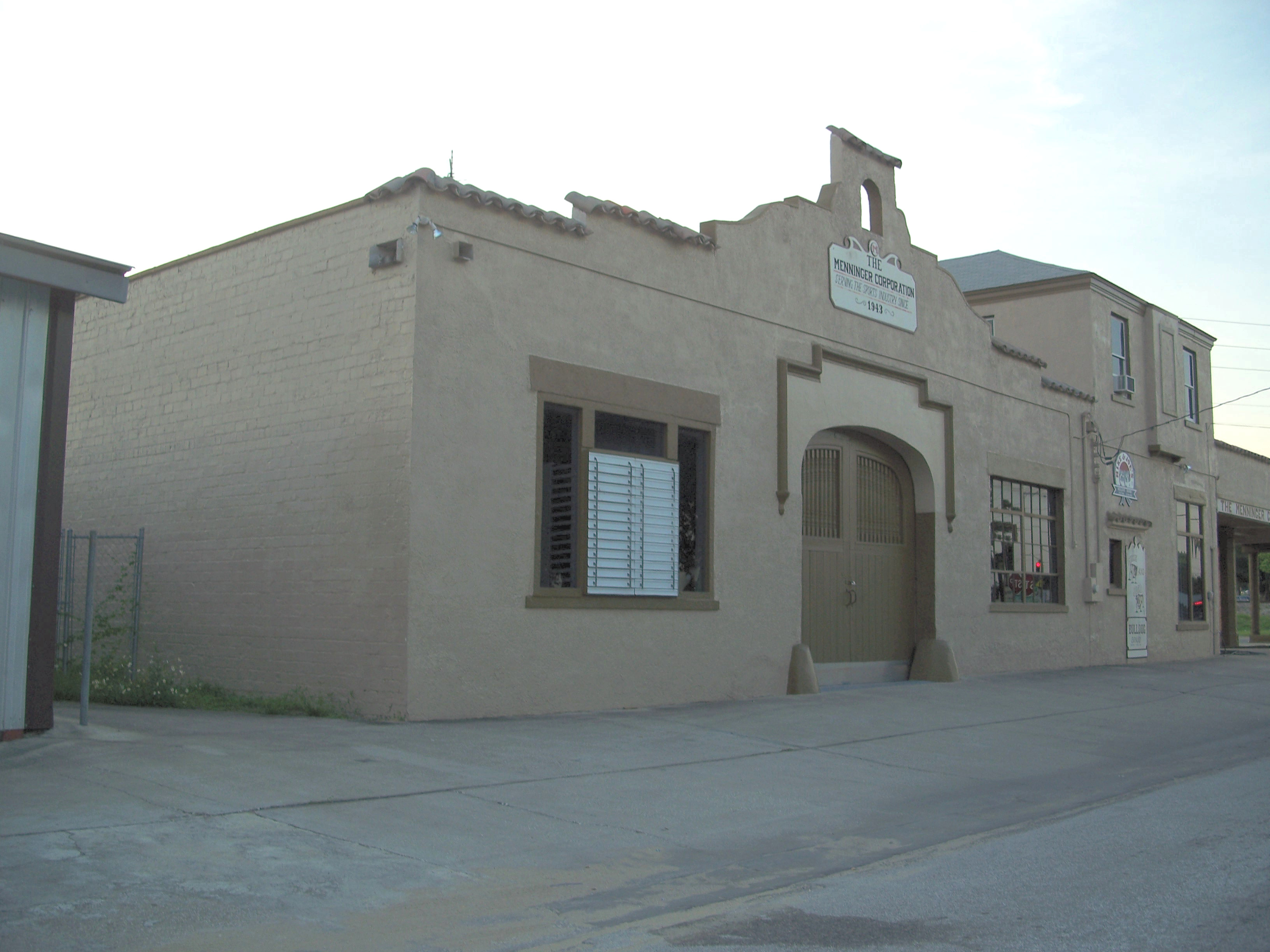
Menninger building

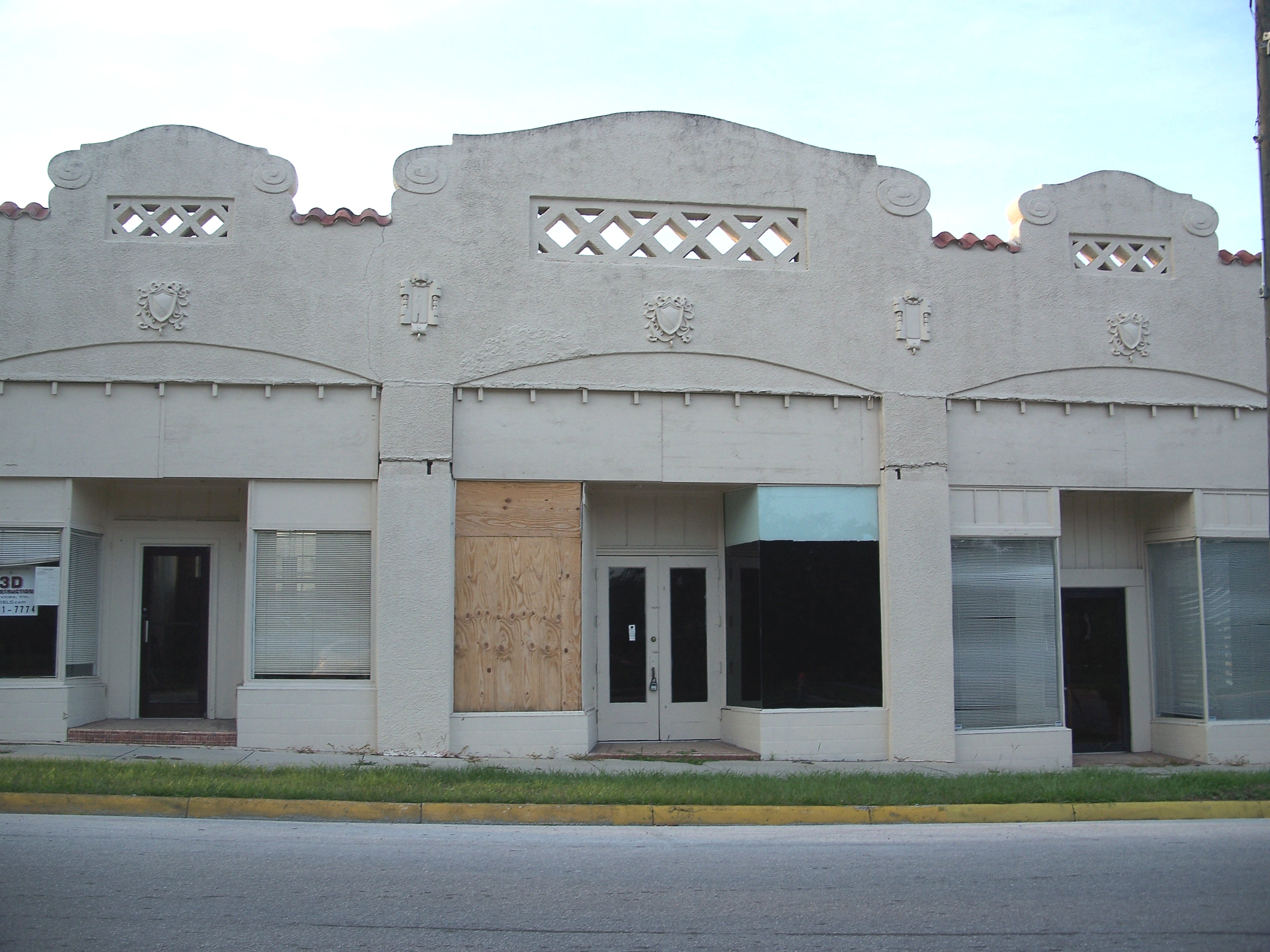
Miller building
