= Homeland School =

- U.S. National Register of Historic Places
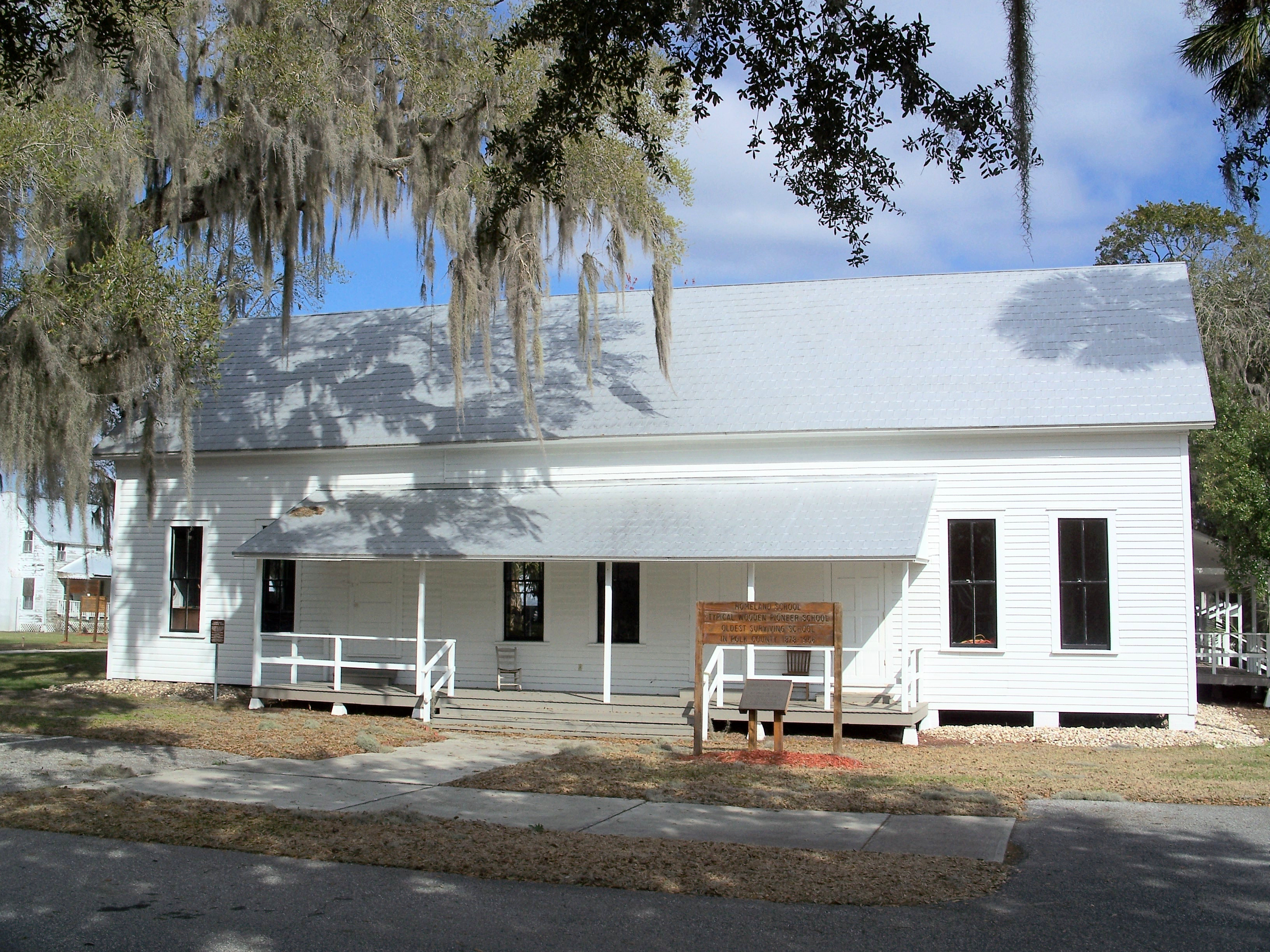

- Location within Florida Location within the United States
- Location: Homeland, Florida
- Coordinates: 27°49′08″N 81°49′43″W
- Built: 1878
- NRHP reference No.: 07000001
- Added to NRHP: February 2, 2007

The Homeland School is a historic school in Homeland, Florida. It is located at 249 Church Avenue, inside Homeland Heritage Park. On February 2, 2007, it was added to the U.S. National Register of Historic Places.
