= Lake Wales City Hall =

- U.S. National Register of Historic Places
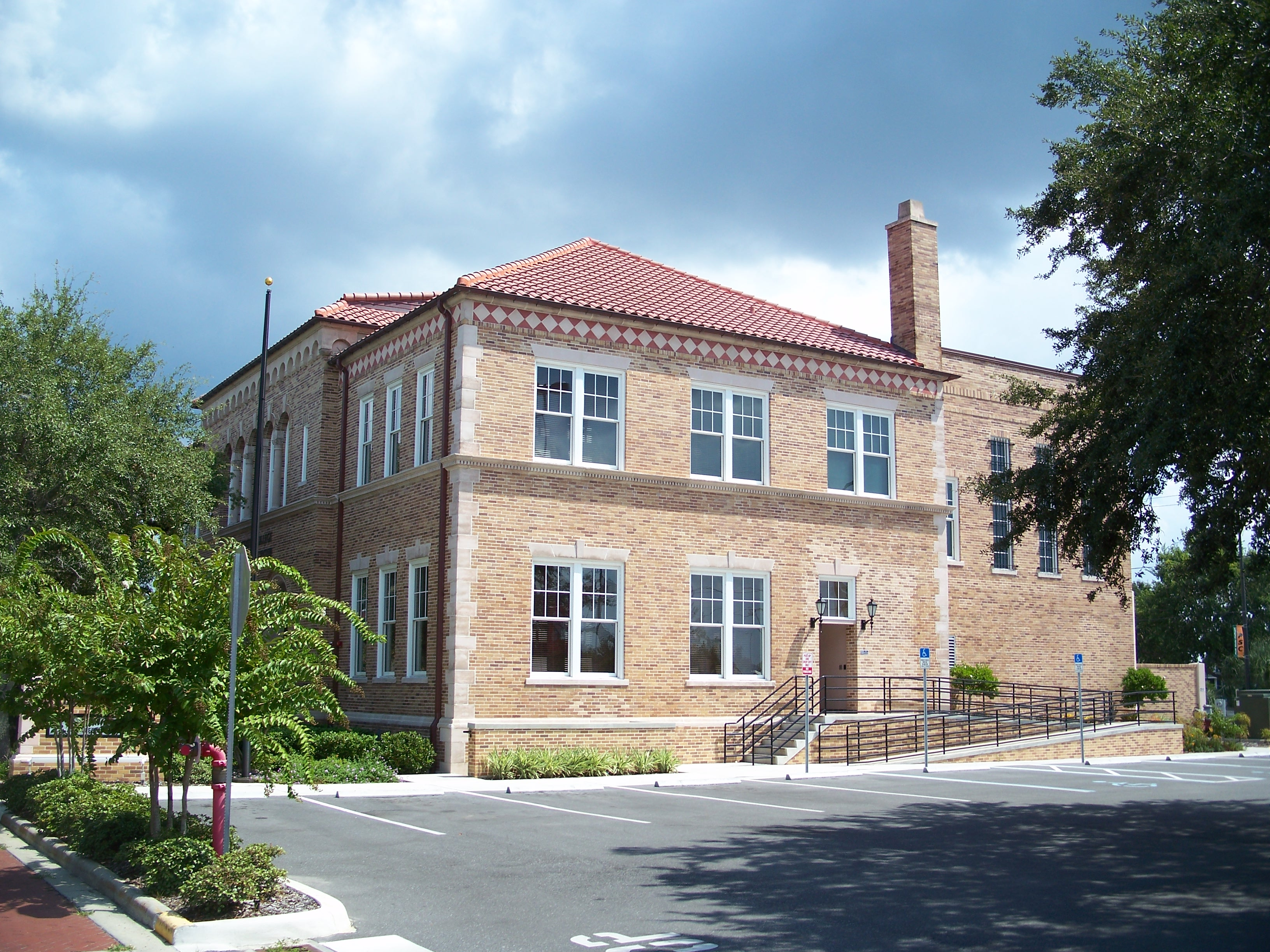

- Location within Florida Location within the United States
- Location: Lake Wales, Florida
- Coordinates: 27°54′2″N 81°35′16″W
- Architectural style: Masonry Vernacular with Mediterranean Revival elements
- MPS: Lake Wales MPS
- NRHP reference No.: 90001274
- Added to NRHP: August 31, 1990

The Lake Wales City Hall is a historic site in Lake Wales, Florida. It is located at 152 East Central Avenue. On August 31, 1990, it was added to the U.S. National Register of Historic Places.

In 2007, Polk Community College began a $3.6 million renovation of the historic structure, converting it into a modern academic center. When complete in 2009 the building will be outfitted with a 50-seat Student Success Center, one 30-seat computer classroom, four 30-seat general classrooms and a 30-seat classroom/community room, which could be used as a meeting room for local civic groups. The center will initially serve 125 students.

At the groundbreaking on May 14, 2007, PCC President Eileen Holden announced that the new 16,000-square-foot (1,500 m^{2}) facility will be called the JD Alexander Center after State Senator Alexander, who was instrumental in securing Public Education Capital Outlay (PECO) monies that will fund the renovation of the historic building.

PCC plans to partner with the Lake Wales Charter High School to create a "Bridge to College" program and with the Lake Wales Literacy Coalition.

The Mediterranean Revival style building opened in 1927. It served as the Lake Wales City Hall until 1998 when offices moved to a new administrative building. A new section was added to the building in 1970, which included a fire station. The old City Hall suffered severe water and wind damage from the 2004 hurricanes. The fire station addition received the most damage.

The following year, State Senator J D Alexander was instrumental in securing funds that paved the way for the City to donate the historic building to PCC for use as an academic center.

PCC officials have said the remodeling of the building's exterior (windows, roof and brick work) will honor the architectural history to the greatest extent possible.

During the final days of 2007, demolition of the interior and exterior of the building was completed. PCC has rented a store across from the Alexander Center. During 2008 it will serve as both a construction office and a welcome center. It will be staffed during normal weekday hours, so residents can visit and receive information about PCC classes and registration.
