= Winston School (Lakeland, Florida) =

- U.S. National Register of Historic Places
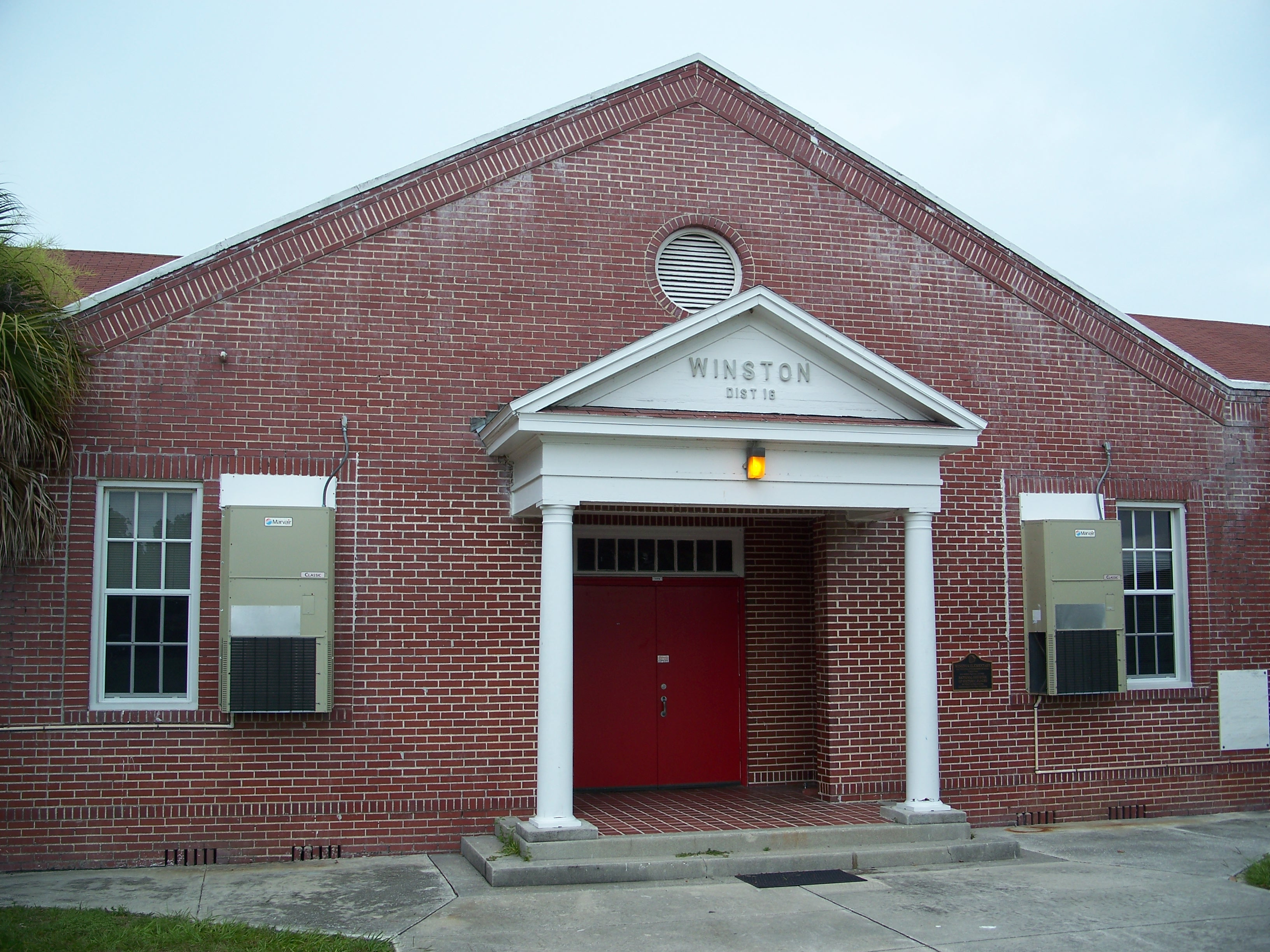

- Location within Florida Location within the United States
- Location: Lakeland, Florida
- Coordinates: 28°3′25″N 82°0′50″W
- NRHP reference No.: 01001362
- Added to NRHP: December 20, 2001

The Winston School (also known as a Strawberry School) is a historic school in Lakeland, Florida. It is located at 3415 Swindell Road. On December 20, 2001, it was added to the U.S. National Register of Historic Places.

== Gallery ==
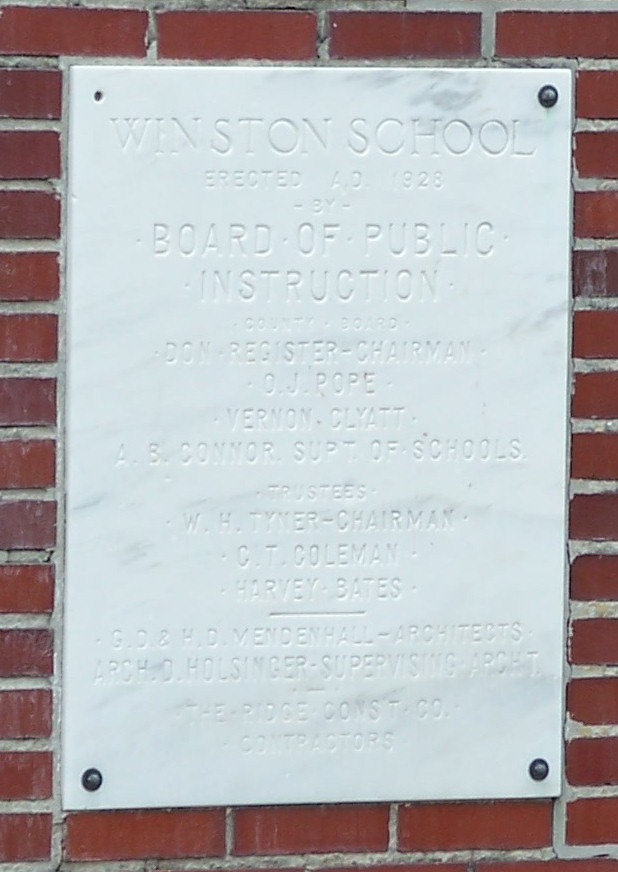
Commemorative stone

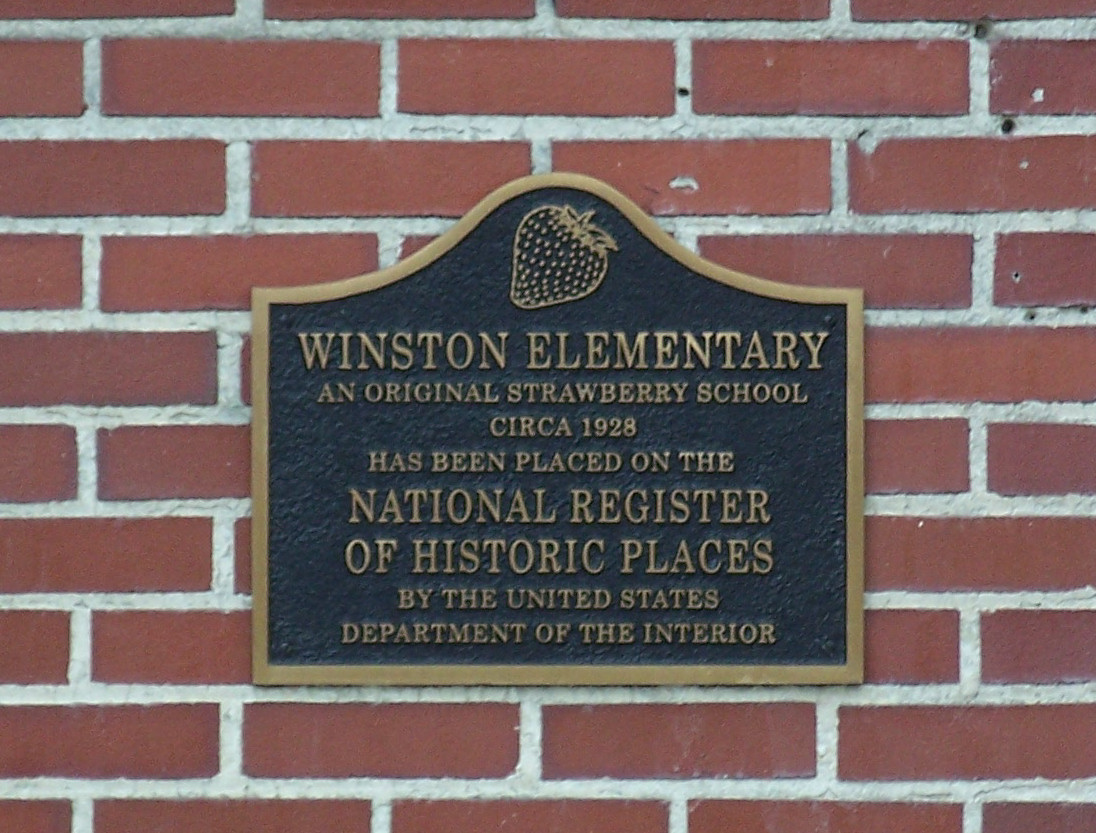
Informational plaque

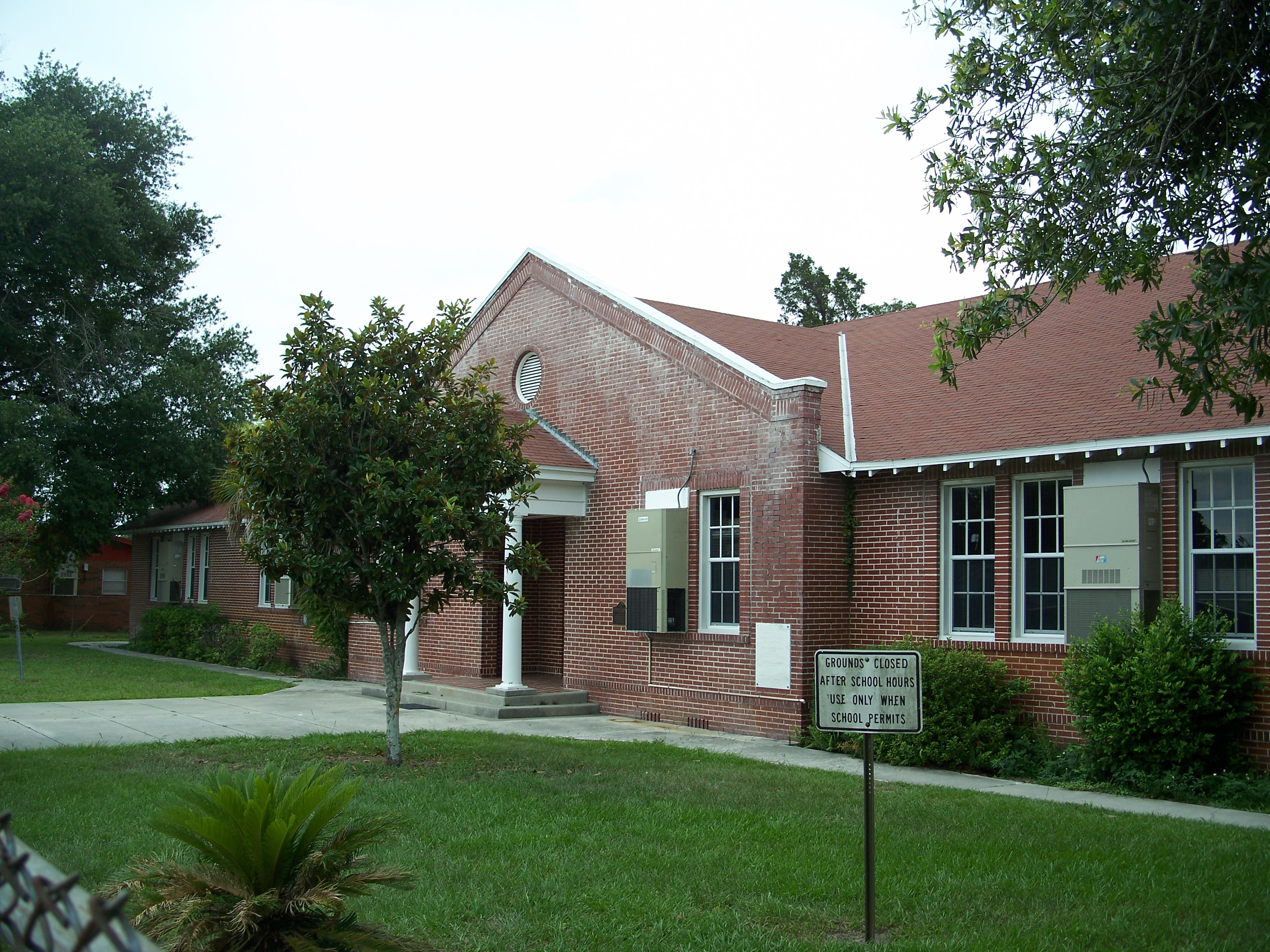
