= Lake Wales Commercial Historic District =

Historic district in Florida, United States

- U.S. National Register of Historic Places
- U.S. Historic district
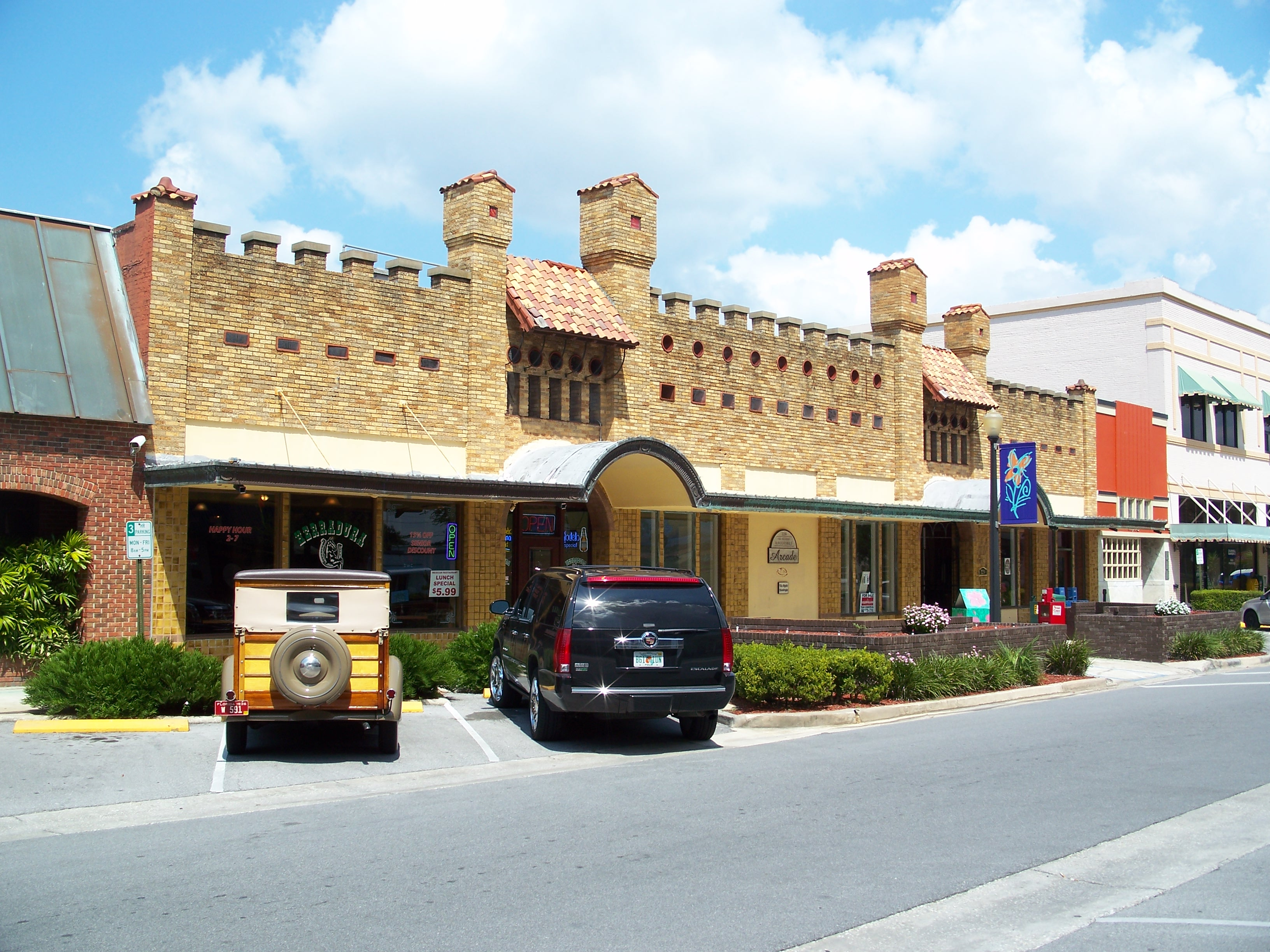
- Rhodesbilt Arcade, in the district

- Location within Florida Location within the United States
- Location: Lake Wales, Florida
- Coordinates: 27°54′7″N 81°35′16″W
- Area: 60 acres (0.24 km^{2})
- MPS: Lake Wales MPS
- NRHP reference No.: 90000732
- Added to NRHP: May 10, 1990

The Lake Wales Commercial Historic District is a U.S. historic district (designated as such on May 10, 1990) located in Lake Wales, Florida. The district is bounded by the US 27A Scenic Highway, Central Avenue, Market Street, and Orange Avenue. It contains 16 historic buildings.
