= Thompson and Company Cigar Factory =

- U.S. National Register of Historic Places
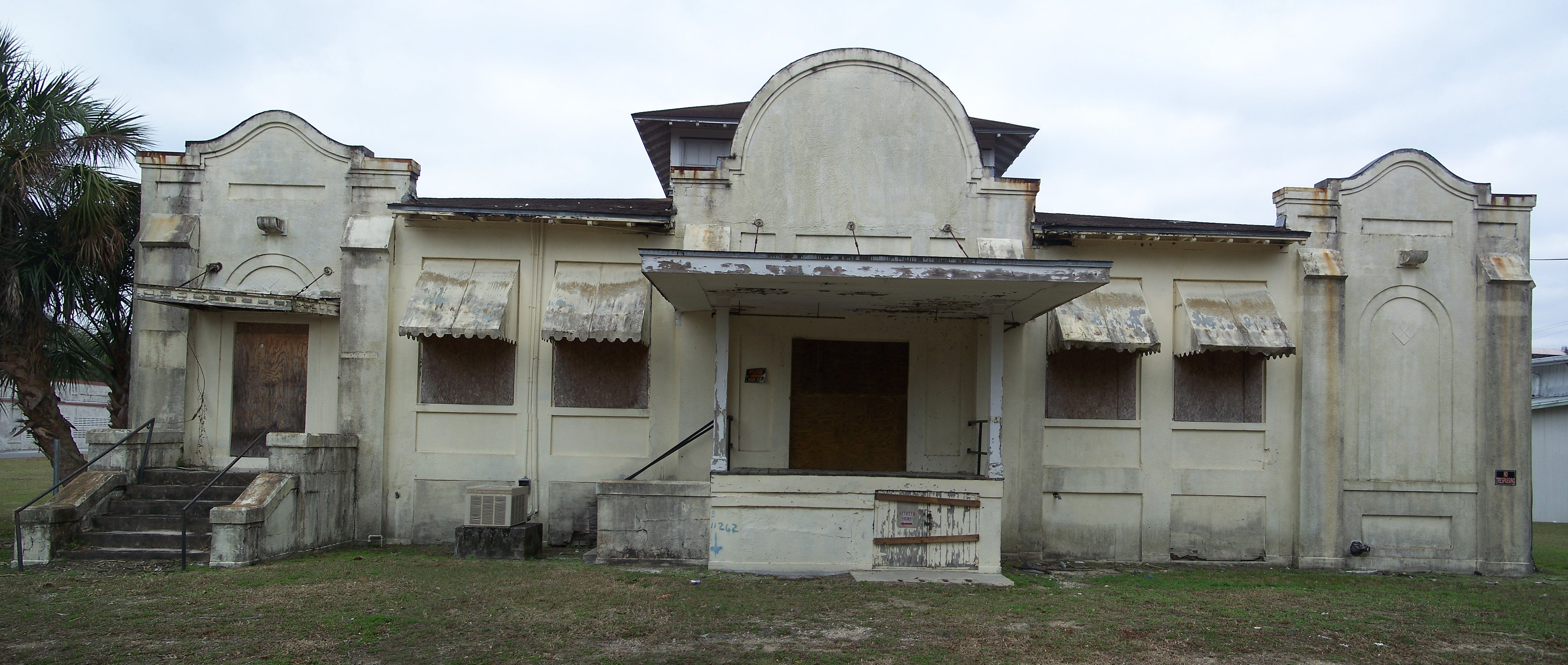

- Location within Florida Location within the United States
- Location: Bartow, Florida
- Coordinates: 27°53′52″N 81°50′00″W
- NRHP reference No.: 02000838
- Added to NRHP: August 9, 2002

Thompson and Company Cigar Factory is a national historic site located at 255 North Third Street, Bartow, Florida in Polk County. It was used by the Thompson Cigar, established in Florida in 1915.

It was added to the National Register of Historic Places on August 9, 2002.
