= Charles R. Wait =

American architect (1880–1973)

Charles Robert Wait
- Born: May 31, 1880; Wakefield, Massachusetts, U.S.
- Died: March 24, 1973 (aged 92); Andover, Massachusetts, U.S.
- Resting place: Laurel Hill Cemetery, Reading, Massachusetts, U.S.
- Education: Harvard College, Harvard Graduate School of Design, École des Beaux-Arts, American Academy in Rome
- Occupation: Architect
- Spouse(s): Anne Hathaway Edwards (m. 1907–1924; her death), Gladys Anderton (m. 1925–1973; his death)
- Children: 3

Charles Robert Wait (May 31, 1880 – March 24, 1973) was an American architect in Massachusetts. He had been partner in the firm of Parsons & Wait in Boston. His notable works include El Retiro (1929–1930) a house in Lake Wales, Florida, and the original clubhouse at Fishers Island Club in Fishers Island, New York.

== Early life and education ==
Charles Robert Wait was born on May 31, 1880, in Wakefield, Massachusetts. His father was architect Robert Pote Wait. He attended Wakefield High School.

Wait graduated with a Bachelor of Arts degree in 1903 from Harvard College, and attended in the Harvard University's school of design (now Harvard Graduate School of Design) where he graduated in 1904. He continued his studies in École des Beaux-Arts in Paris, and at the American Academy in Rome.

== Career ==
Wait started his career as a draftsman for the Olmsted Brothers, a landscape architectural firm where he remained for 12 years. He worked at the Olmsted Brothers with landscape architect William Lyman Phillips. Wait was a partner in the firm of Parsons & Wait in Boston, founded in 1920 with Ernst Mey Parson.

His works include El Retiro (1929–1930; also known as Pinewood Estate) a house in Lake Wales, Florida. Wait also designed the original clubhouse at Fishers Island Club in Fishers Island, New York. In 1933, the Fishers Island Club clubhouse served as a temporary home for students from the Ethel Walker School after a fire had destroyed two of the dormitories used by girls at the preparatory school in Connecticut. During World War II, the Fishers Island Club building was leased to the United States Navy and used as a training school.

He was a member of American Institute of Architects.

Wait's first wife, Anne Hathaway Edwards, died in 1924. He remarried to Gladys Anderton in 1925.

Wait died on March 24, 1973, in a nursing home in Andover.

== Works ==
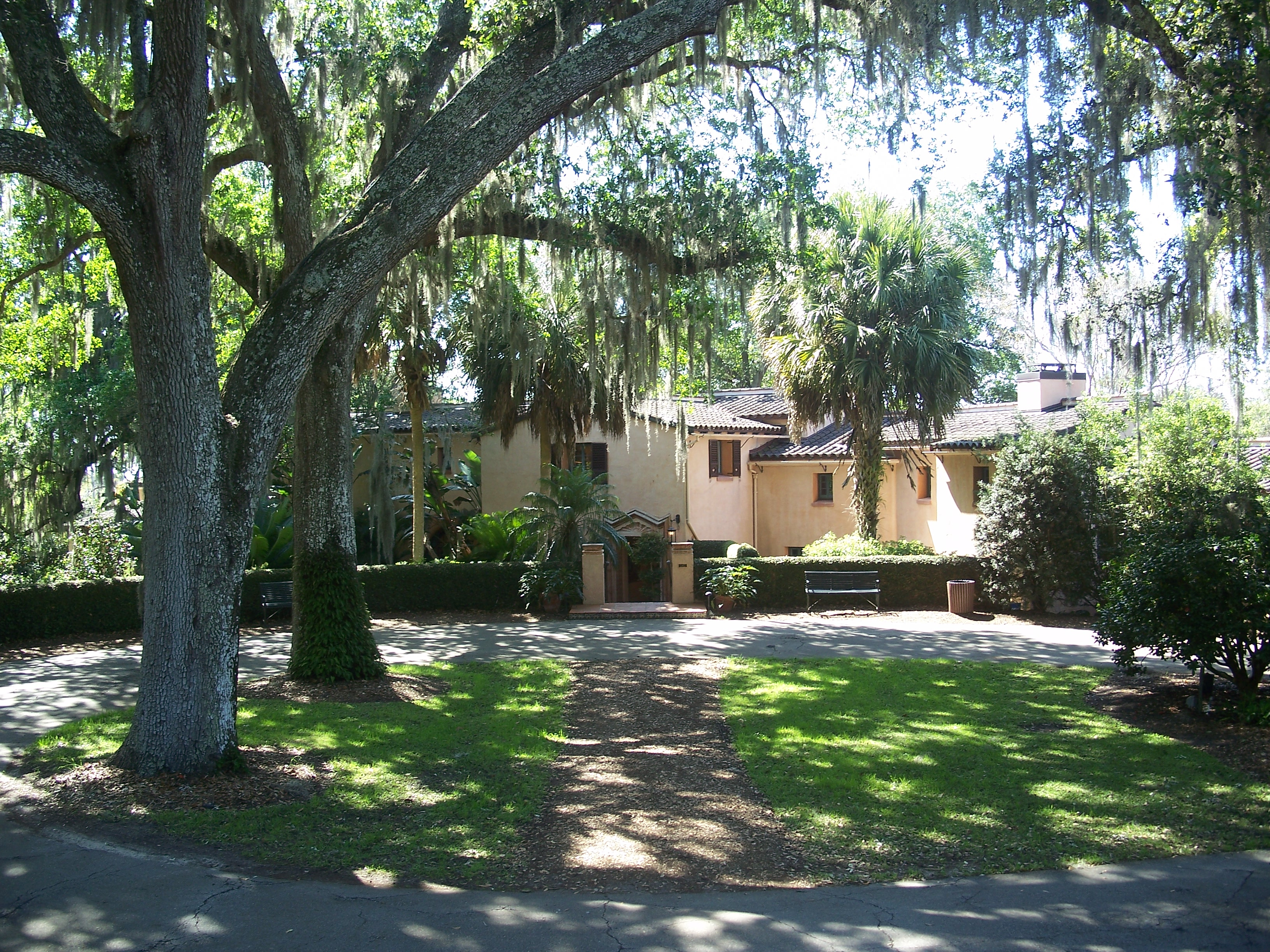
El Retiro (1930)

- Homes in the community of Mountain Lake, Florida, a 1920s development; including Edward Bok's home Valentino (1922), and Maison Sur La Colline (1925)
- El Retiro (1929–1930) at Bok Tower Gardens, Lake Wales, Florida; also known as the Pinewood Estate.
- Fishers Island Club (1927, demolished 1963), in Fishers Island, New York
- House at 6 Adams Street, renovation, in Wakefield, Massachusetts

== See also ==
- Tavern Acres Historic District in North Andover, Massachusetts
