= Mountain Lake, Florida =

Historic district in Florida, United States

- U.S. National Register of Historic Places
- U.S. Historic district
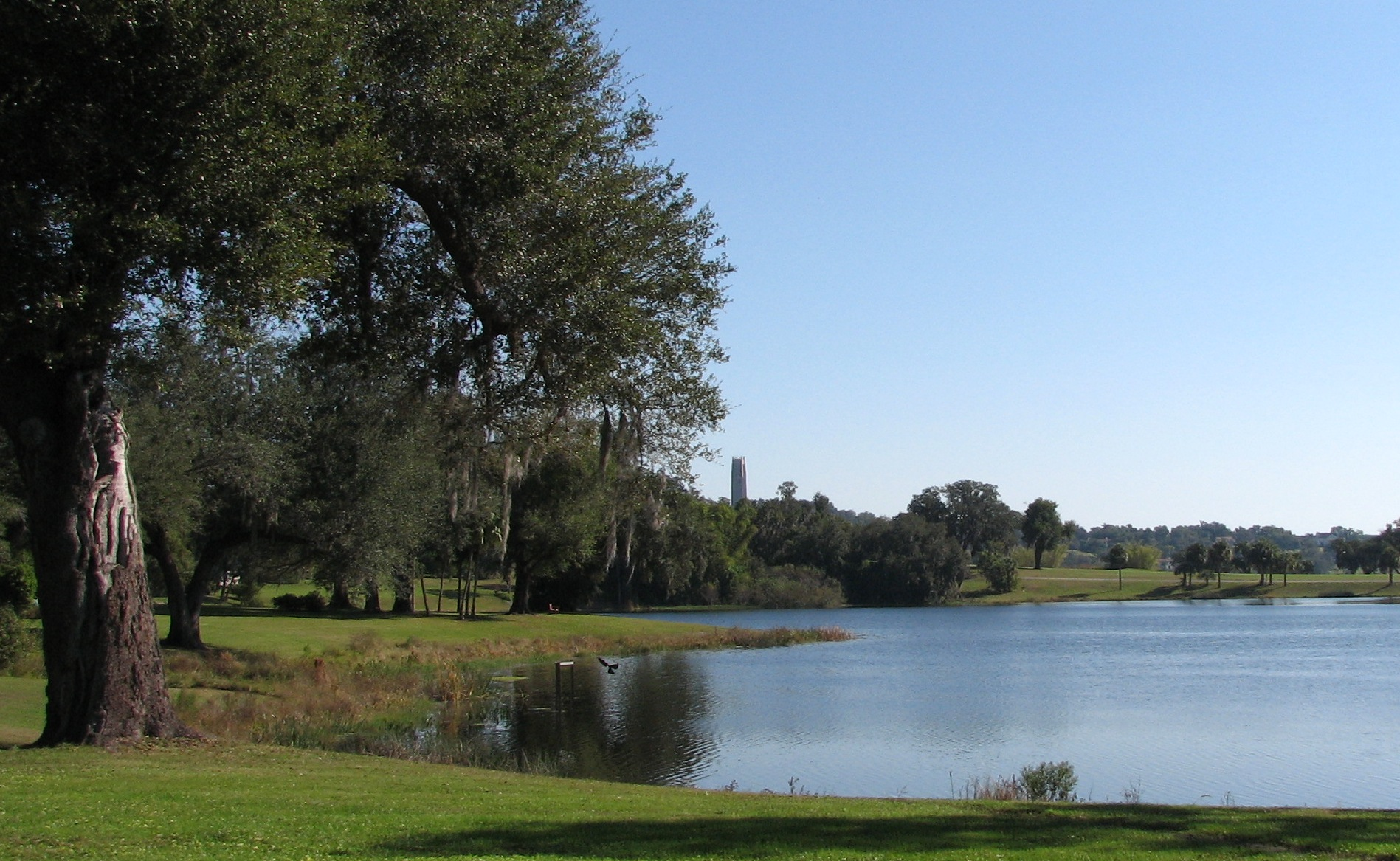
- entrance to Mountain Lake Estates, with Bok Tower in distance

- Location within Florida Location within the United States
- Location: Lake Wales, Florida
- Coordinates: 27°56′9.6″N 81°34′58.8″W
- Area: 896 acres (3.63 km^{2})
- Architectural style: Mission/Spanish Revival, Colonial Revival
- NRHP reference No.: 93000871
- Added to NRHP: August 26, 1993

Mountain Lake is a private community and U.S. historic district north of the City of Lake Wales, Florida, United States, off the FL 17 (formerly US 27A) Scenic Highway. Mountain Lake was founded in 1915, with major development of the property commencing in the 1920s. It was designated as a historic district (Mountain Lake Estates Historic District) in August 1993. It has also been designated as an Audubon International leader in community sustainability.

Mountain Lake is located in the ridge country of Central Florida, and was developed by Baltimorean Frederick S. Ruth. According to the National Park Service, Ruth purchased 3,500 acres of "lush land in the richest and most elevated real estate in the area" consisting of Florida's "liveliest hills, lakes, forests, and groves".

The developers wanted Mountain Lake to be an exclusive residential area created "to attract the nation's business elite". With proximity close to trains from the North which would bring residents down for ‘the season,' Ruth engaged Frederick Law Olmsted Jr. to lay out 600 acres of the property for the residences and Seth Raynor to design the golf course. This same trio of Ruth, Olmsted and Raynor went on to design and develop Fishers Island Club in the 1920s, while Olmsted and Raynor also designed Yeamans Hall Club. There are some notes in the archives at Mountain Lake that Ruth spoke to Donald Ross prior to selecting Raynor; however Raynor was chosen and Mountain Lake became the first development of its kind.

Such wealthy and widely known people as Edward W. Bok (long-time editor of Ladies' Home Journal and Pulitzer-Prize-winning author), August Heckscher (benefactor of the Heckscher Museum of Art), and Irving T. Bush (of Bush Terminal, Bush Tower, and Bush House fame) subsequently became early "snowbirds" and established winter homes in or near Mountain Lake Estates.

Vanity Fair described Mountain Lake in 2001 as an "old, established Wasp enclave in rural central Florida".

Well-known sites, the Mountain Lake Colony House and Bok Tower Gardens, are part of Mountain Lake.

== Historic buildings ==
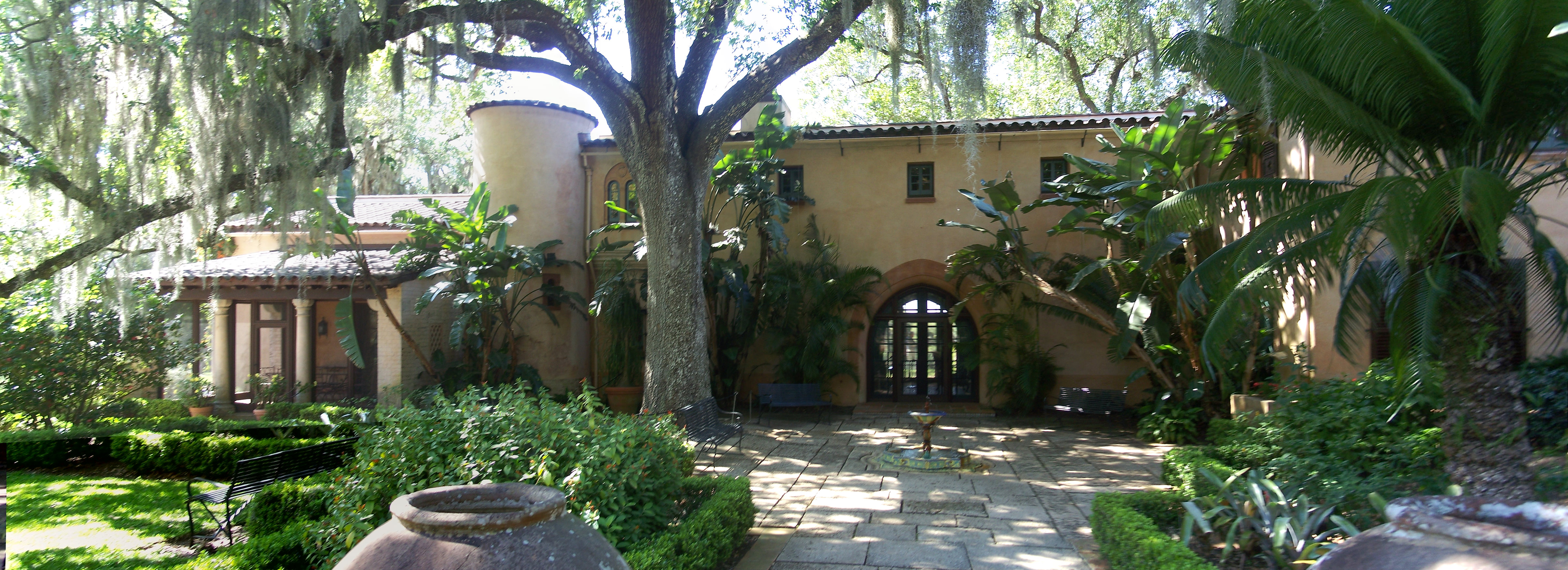
El Retiro, one of the historic buildings in Mountain Lake

The Mountain Lake Historical District contains 65 historic buildings, including two that are listed on the National Register: El Retiro Estate, which is part of the landmark Bok Tower Gardens, and Mountain Lake Colony House. Noted architect Wallace Neff, known for his celebrity clients' mansions in southern California (see for example Pickfair), designed one home within Mountain Lakes Estates, one of his few commissions outside California.

Mission Revival, Colonial Revival, and other "revival" styles of architecture are most common. House lots within the historic district can be sizable; as an example, Irving T. Bush's estate covered five acres (about 2 hectares).

A significant building constructed in the 1920s by the Olmsted Brothers, the Mediterranean Revival style Mountain Lake Colony House near the golf course is used as a club for the residents and offers rooms for their guests. The House is listed on the National Register of Historic Places.

== Notable people ==
- Roger Babson
- Edward W. Bok
- Irving T. Bush
- Henry M. Crane
- August Heckscher
- Frederick Law Olmsted Jr.
- Charles Austin Buck
- Alfred Robert Louis Dohme
- Isaac T. Mann
- Conrad Hubert Eveready Battery Company
- Paul O'Neill
- Paul Starrett
