= Mountain Lake Colony House =

- U.S. National Register of Historic Places
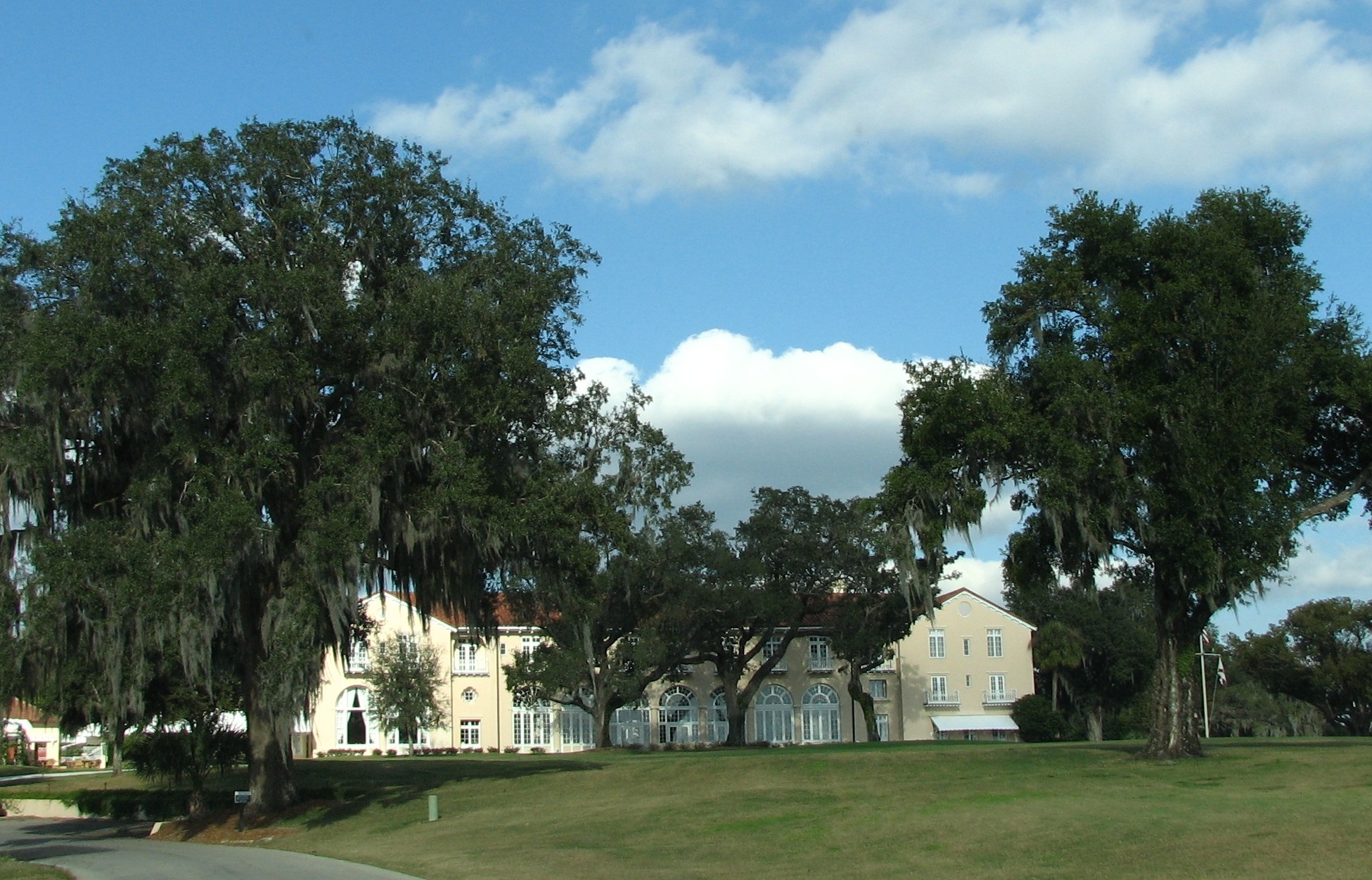

- Location within Florida Location within the United States
- Location: Lake Wales, Florida
- Coordinates: 27°56′12.53″N 81°35′32.92″W
- NRHP reference No.: 91000113
- Added to NRHP: February 22, 1991

The Mountain Lake Colony House (also known as the Mountain Lake Club House) is a historic site within the Mountain Lake Estates Historic District in Lake Wales, Florida. This three-story Mediterranean Revival clubhouse and inn was originally designed in 1916 by Frederick Law Olmsted Jr., and features pergolas, loggias, and a barrel-tile roof. It is located east of State Road 17, on the north shore of Mountain Lake. On February 22, 1991, it was added to the U.S. National Register of Historic Places.
