= Seth Raynor =

Golf course architect (1874–1926)

- Born: May 7, 1874; Manorville, New York, United States
- Died: January 23, 1926 (aged 51); West Palm Beach, Florida, United States
- Burial place: Southampton Cemetery
- Education: Princeton University
- Occupations: Civil engineer Golf course architect
- Spouse: Mary Araminta Hallock (m. 1903)

Seth Jagger Raynor (May 7, 1874 – January 23, 1926) was an American golf course architect and civil engineer. He designed approximately 85 golf courses in about 13 years, his first in 1914, at age 40. His mentor was Charles Blair Macdonald, the creator of the National Golf Links of America, and a member of the World Golf Hall of Fame.

Raynor was also the mentor of Charles Banks, who completed many of Raynor's unfinished works after he died. Banks went on to a solo design career, creating approximately 15 courses.

== Biography ==
Seth Jagger Raynor was born in Manorville, New York on May 7, 1874, to David Henry Raynor and Ella Jerusha Raynor (née Burnett). His father, David Henry Raynor, was a civil engineer and surveyor, who had surveyed the land for the original 12-hole layout of Shinnecock Hills Golf Club in Southampton. Raynor's first and middle names are the same as two of his grandparents; his paternal grandfather, Seth Raynor, served as the first station agent for the Manorville station on the Long Island Rail Road, while his maternal grandmother, the former Eliza Jagger of Southampton, married John Fowler Burnett in 1848.

Raynor attended Princeton Preparatory School before taking courses in civil engineering at Princeton University from 1894 to 1898. He married Mary Araminta Hallock in 1903, and for the first years of his working life, engineered drains, roads and waterworks in the area around Southampton, where his family had relocated and where he would live for the rest of his life. In 1901, he formed a partnership with Arthur J. Strange based on Southampton called Strange & Raynor, which solicited work in landscape gardening, general contracting, macadam roads, drainage, and sewage disposal. Recounting his early days as a civil engineer, Raynor said, "I made a living, that was about all."

== Golf course engineer, architect ==
In 1908, Raynor was hired to perform a boundary survey of the site for the new course National Golf Links of America (NGLA), in Southampton, by Macdonald. When it opened, NGLA was considered the finest American golf course and remains one of the top designs in the world. Macdonald was impressed with Raynor and the two forged a working relationship and Raynor overseeing the construction of every course designed by Macdonald from then on, including Piping Rock Club, St. Louis Country Club, and the Mid Ocean Club, approximately 15 in all. By 1914, Raynor was handling his first solo design projects, including the Country Club of Fairfield, in Connecticut, and Westhampton Country Club on Long Island, New York, and Mountain Lake in Lake Wales, Florida. Between 1914 and 1917, Raynor oversaw the construction of The Lido Golf Club, designed by Macdonald. This was one of the most difficult and expensive golf projects to that date.

Raynor, who rarely played golf, never became adept at the sport, reportedly not wanting to design around his own game. "He scarcely knew a golf ball from a tennis ball when we first met," Macdonald recounted.

All of Raynor's courses feature adaptations of some of what Macdonald considered the ideal golf in the British Isles and Europe, such as the Redan, Biarritz, Eden, Leven, Road and Maiden. Raynor, like Macdonald and later Charles Banks, fit the concept of the originals into the particular site, never seeking to duplicate them. Raynor never saw any of the originals in person. On every Raynor golf course, though, some of if not the finest holes to be found are ones Raynor created with basing them on ideal golf holes.

Several of Raynor's designs have hosted and continue to host significant events. His Waialae Country Club in Honolulu has hosted the PGA Tour's Sony Open since the 1960s, making it one of the longest-running host sites on the Tour. At The Greenbrier in White Sulphur Springs, West Virginia, his Old White TPC Course hosted a PGA Tour event. The Country Club of Charleston hosted the 2019 U.S. Women's Open won by Lee Jeong-eun also known as Jeongeun Lee6.

Raynor died with his wife by his side from pneumonia in 1926, age 51, while staying in a suite at the Hotel Elverano in West Palm Beach. Both of them had traveled to Florida for the opening of a course he designed for Paris Singer; Raynor was stricken with pneumonia soon after his arrival. At the time of his death, he was close to finishing his work on the Monterey Peninsula Country Club and had been working on plans for the Cypress Point Club, both located in California. Raynor was buried at Southampton Cemetery. Having no children, he left his entire estate to his wife, which was valued at $48,363 in 1928.

== Legacy ==
During the 1990s, King Oehmig (the son of Lew Oehmig) and Doug Stein—both members of the Lookout Mountain Club in Tennessee—discovered Raynor's original blueprints for their golf course and visited other courses he had designed to get a better understanding of his design philosophy to initiate a course restoration project. In 2006, Oehmig and Stein went on to co-found the "Seth Raynor Society" to bring together other enthusiasts of golf courses designed by Raynor, Macdonald (his mentor), or Banks (his protégé). The interest in Raynor's work has led other golf clubs to search for copies of Raynor's original blueprints when undertaking restorations of their courses to preserve the layout he had originally envisioned.

A bronze bust of Seth Raynor is located near the first tee of the Blue Mound Golf & Country Club in Wisconsin.

== Golf courses ==
Golf courses that have been designed or renovated by Seth Raynor include:

- Augusta Country Club, Bon Air Hotel, Lake Course – Augusta, GA (1925), conversion of sand greens to grass – no longer in existence
- Blue Mound Golf & Country Club – Wauwatosa, WI (1926)
- Chicago Golf Club – Wheaton, IL (1923), redesign of Macdonald's original layout with his blessing
- Essex County Country Club – West Orange, NJ (1925)
- Everglades Club – Palm Beach, FL (1920), first nine holes
- Fishers Island Club – Fishers Island, NY (1926)
- Forest Park Golf Course – St. Louis, MO, routing only
- The Greenbrier, No. 1 course (now known as the Old White Course) – White Sulphur Springs, WV (1923), renovation
- The Greenbrier, No. 2 course (now known as the Meadows Course) – White Sulphur Springs, WV (1924)
- The Greenbrier, No. 3 course (now known as The Greenbrier) – White Sulphur Springs, WV (1923), renovation of original nine hole layout
- Hotchkiss School – Lakeville, CT (1925)
- Monterey Peninsula Country Club, Dunes Course – Pebble Beach, CA (1926)
- Mountain Lake, Florida – Lake Wales, FL (1917, 1921)
- Oakland Golf Club – Bayside, NY (1919), renovation – no longer in existence
- Waialae Country Club – Honolulu, HI (1927)
- Yale University Golf Course – New Haven, CT (1926)
- Yeamans Hall Club – Private in Hanahan, SC (1925)
