= El Retiro (Lake Wales, Florida) =

Historic house in Florida, US

- U.S. National Register of Historic Places
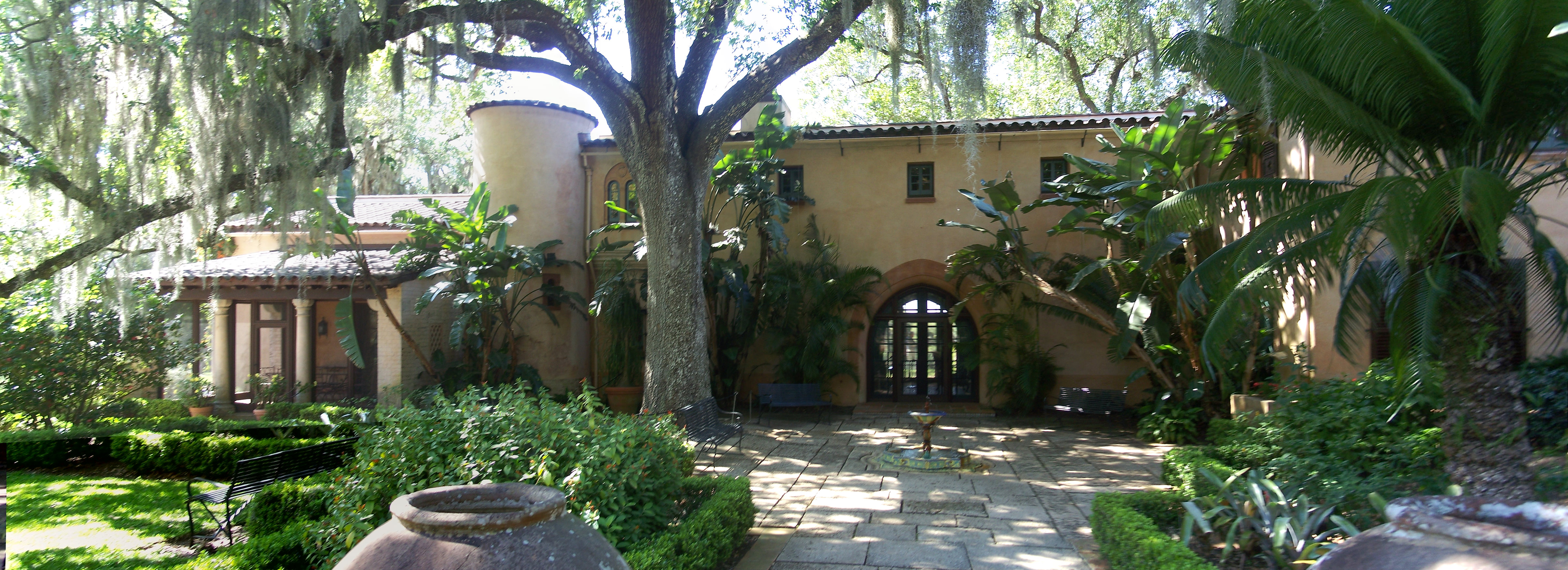

- Location within Florida
- Nearest city: Lake Wales, Florida, U.S.
- Coordinates: 27°56′16″N 81°34′10″W
- Area: 7.6 acres (3.1 ha)
- Built: 1930
- Architect: Charles Wait; Olmsted Brothers
- Architectural style: Late 19th And 20th Century Revivals, Mediterranean Revival
- NRHP reference No.: 85003331
- Added to NRHP: December 12, 1985

El Retiro (also known as Encierro, and as Pinewood Estate) is a historic residence at 1151 Tower Boulvard in Lake Wales, Florida, United States. On December 12, 1985, it was added to the U.S. National Register of Historic Places.

== History ==
The 12,900 square foot house was designed by architect Charles R. Wait for the original owner, Charles Austin Buck, a Bethlehem Steel executive.

The design specified a "barrel-tile roof, thick walls, substantial carved doors and woodwork, and intricately detailed wrought iron ... and three large porches". The gardens were designed by William Lyman Phillips of the Olmsted Brothers firm. The work on the property was completed in 1929–1930. Buck owned the home until 1945.

It was purchased by Nellie Lee Holt Bok in 1970, and renamed Pinewood Estate. A subsequent restoration of the gardens, to their original design, was completed by landscape architect Rudy Favretti.

Since 1970, the estate has been part of Bok Tower Gardens, a garden and bird sanctuary, and is again known as El Retiro. Visitors to the Bok Tower Gardens may tour the home for an additional fee.

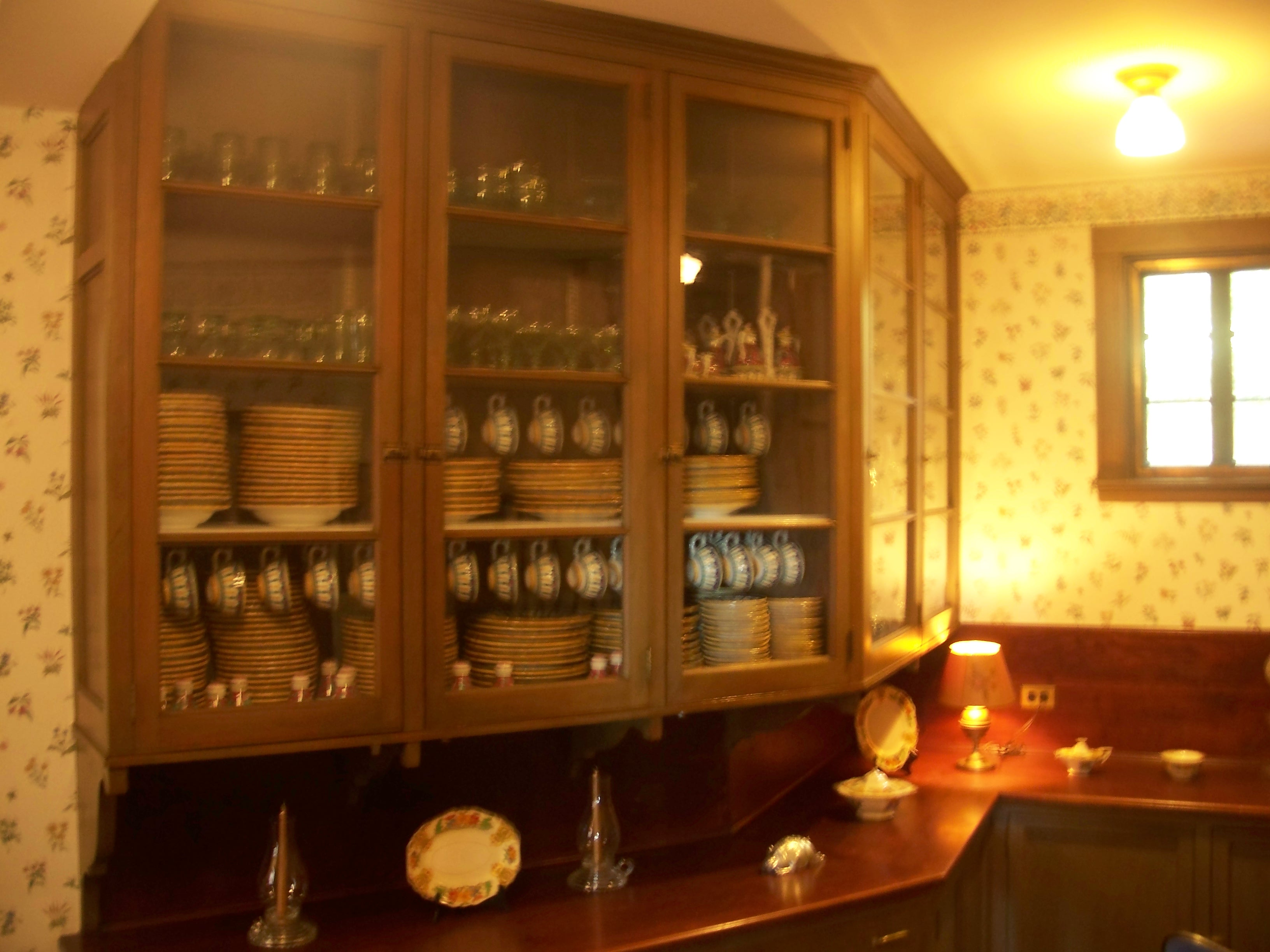
Inside view
