= McLaughlin Middle School and Fine Arts Academy =

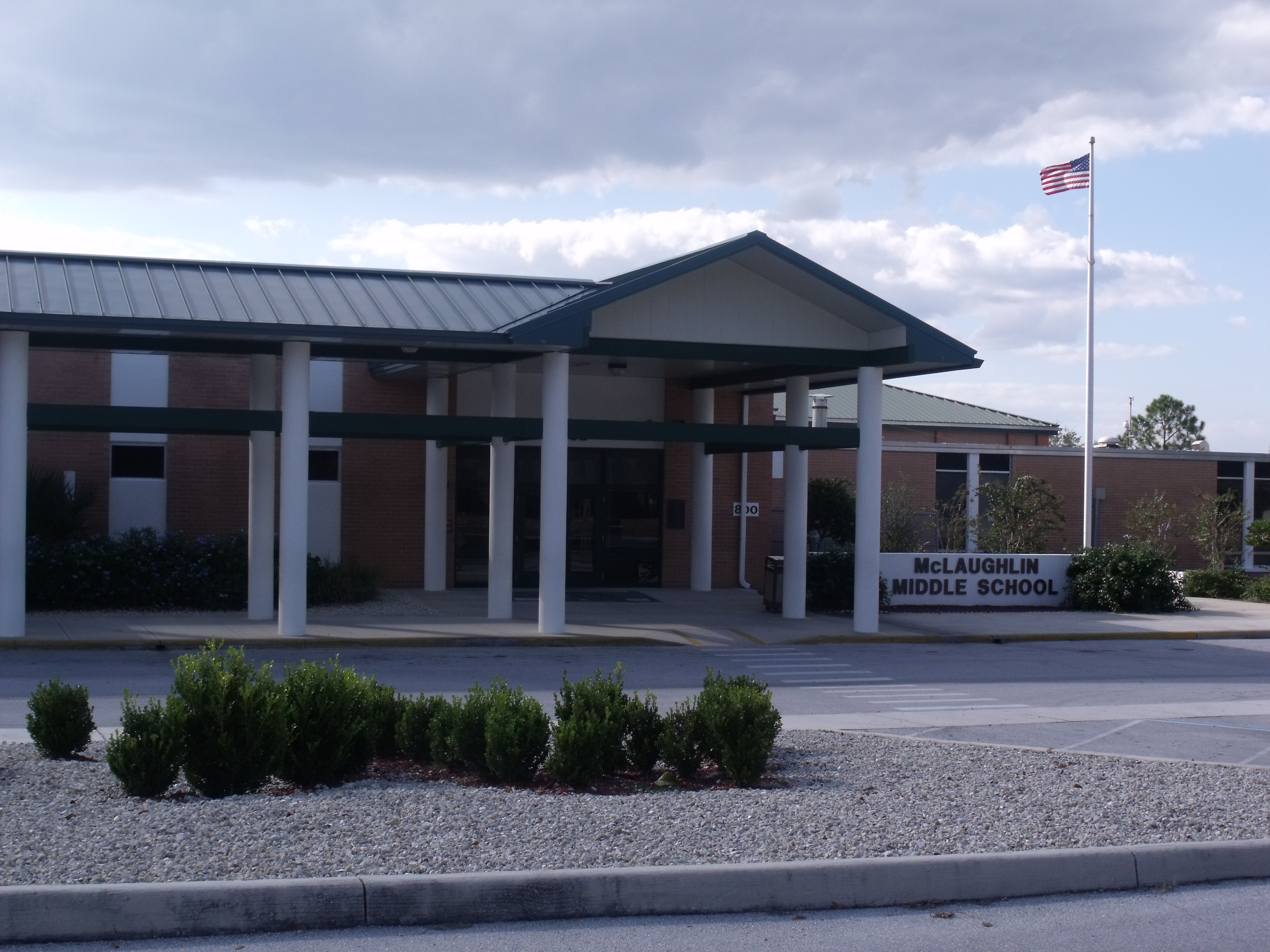

Location
- 800 South Fourth St; Lake Wales, Florida 33853; United States; 27.888369°N 81.584108°W

Information
- Type: Public
- Established: 1964
- Principal: Eileen Killebrew (2015-Present)
- Grades: 6 - 12
- Campus: suburban
- Colors: Orange, Black
- Mascot: Phoenix
- Website: https://mclaughlinacademy.polkschoolsfl.com/

McLaughlin Middle School and Fine Arts Academy is a Polk County Public Schools middle school located southeast of downtown in Lake Wales, Florida.

== History ==
The school opened in 1964 as Lake Wales Junior High School. Its name was changed in 1985 to McLaughlin Junior High, then McLaughlin Middle School.

=== Arts Academy ===
Modeled after a similar institution in Detroit, McLaughlin added more intensive fine arts programs in 2007 . The school changed its name to the McLaughlin Middle School and Fine Arts Academy. The school is now one of four middle schools to have an arts focus in Polk County.

In 2011, McLaughlin was designated an Arts Achieve! Model School by the Florida Alliance for Arts Education. Through the 2013-2014 school year, it helped other schools around Florida develop their visual and performing arts programs.

== Dress Code ==
The McLaughlin Middle dress code requires students to wear khaki or black pants, shorts, or skirts, along with the assigned school shirt. The color of shirt is determined by the current grade level of the student. Only grades 6th - 8th are required to wear uniforms.
