= Essex County Country Club =

Golf club in West Orange, New Jersey

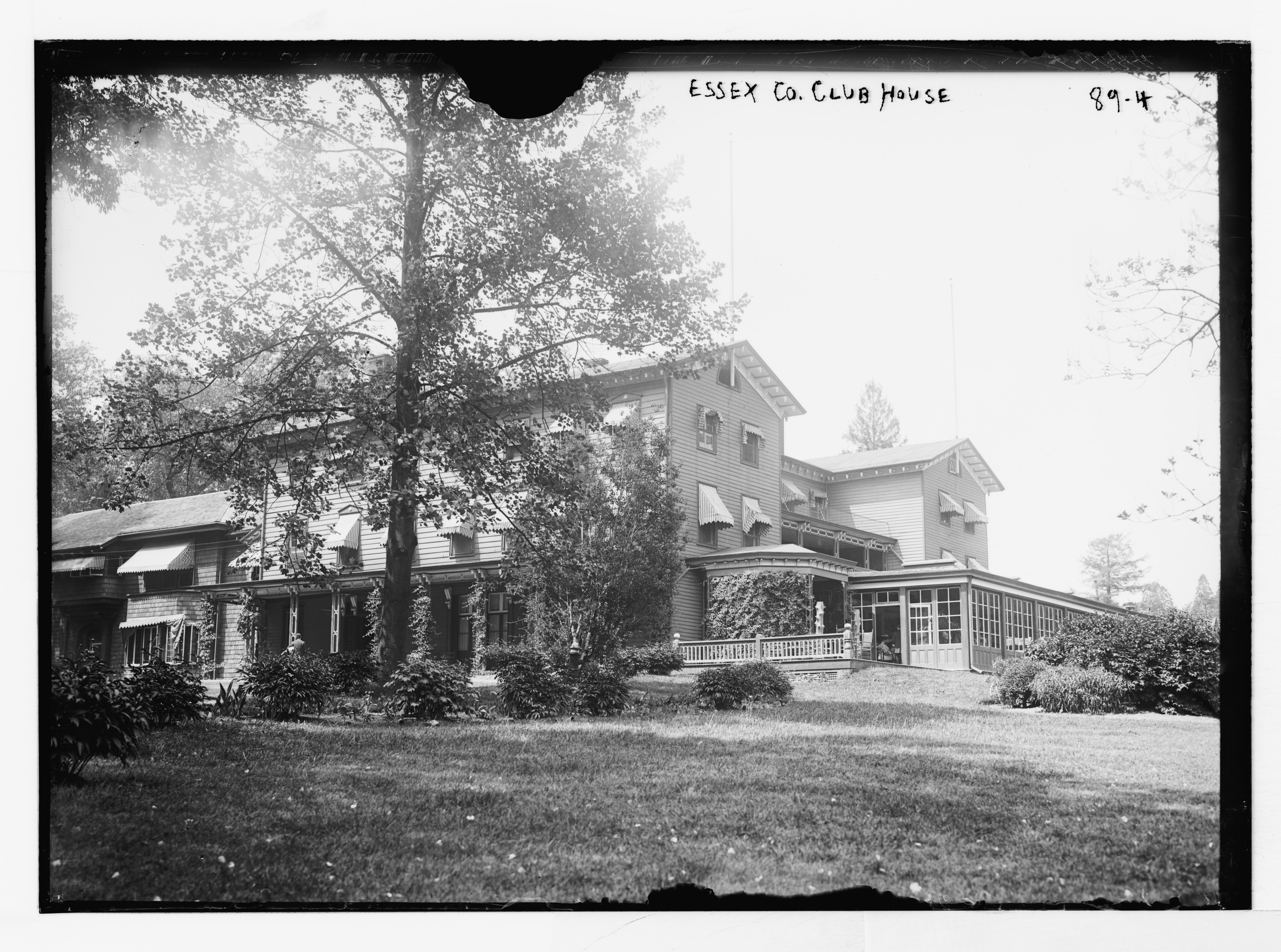
- Essex Country Club House, early 1900s

- Location within New Jersey
- 40°47′18.9636″N 74°15′26.9712″W

Club information
- Location: West Orange, New Jersey, U.S.
- Established: 1887
- Type: Private
- Tota holes: 18
- Website: www.essexcountycc.com
- Designed by: A.W. Tillinghast, Seth Raynor, Charles Banks; renovation by Gil Hanse
- Par: 71
- Length: 7,101 yards (6,493 m)

Essex County Country Club (ECCC) is a golf club in West Orange, New Jersey. It was founded in 1887, making it the oldest club in the state of New Jersey and the sixth oldest in the United States.

== History ==
Essex County Country Club was established on what used to be the Orange Springs Hotel, a health resort centered around the Orange Mineral Springs. The hotel was purchased in 1889 and became ECCC. The former hotel became known as the Mansion House and became the clubhouse.

A nine-hole course was completed in 1895 and extended to 18 holes in 1897, designed by Alex Findlay. In 1900, Essex County hosted a meeting which included representatives from 10 New Jersey clubs and resulted in the birth of the New Jersey State Golf Association. Later that year, it hosted the first New Jersey Amateur Championship.

In 1916, A.W. Tillinghast designed a new 18-hole course, called the "Upper Course," on a 180-acre (73 ha) site on top of First Mountain, a few miles away from the original course. A second 18-hole course designed by Seth Raynor was built in the late 1920s; this course was sold in the 1970s, becoming the Francis A. Byrne Golf Course. The current course was also designed by Raynor and completed by Charles Banks; it retains seven Tillinghast designed holes alongside eleven new holes. In the early 21st century, renovation work was undertaken by Gil Hanse.

Some of its noted former members are Thomas Edison, Emlen Roosevelt, U.S. senator Joseph Frelinghuysen, and George W. Merck, president of Merck Chemical.

In addition to golf, popular sports on the club grounds in its early days included fox hunting, polo, lawn tennis, squash, and trap shooting.
