= Dixie Walesbilt Hotel =

- U.S. National Register of Historic Places
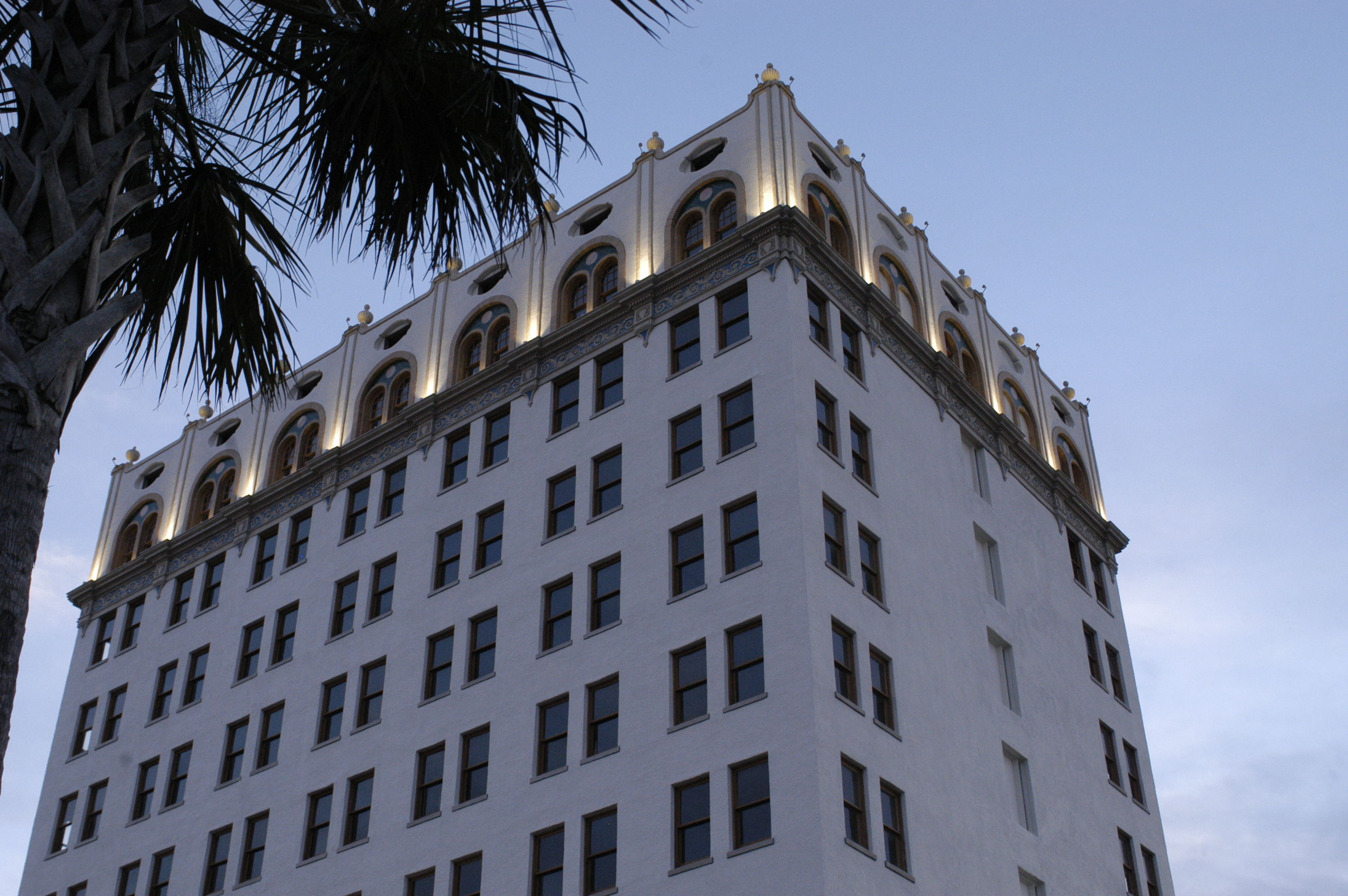

- Location within Florida Location within the United States
- Location: Lake Wales, Florida
- Coordinates: 27°54′7″N 81°35′24″W
- Built: 1926
- Architect: Fred A. Bishop
- Architectural style: Masonry Vernacular with Mediterranean Revival elements
- MPS: Lake Wales MPS
- NRHP reference No.: 90001273
- Added to NRHP: August 31, 1990

The Dixie Walesbilt Hotel (also known as the Hotel Walesbilt) is a historic hotel in Lake Wales, Florida, United States located at 5 Park Avenue West and/or 115 North 1st Street.

== History ==
The hotel was built in 1926, after a stock-sale campaign in the local business community. It opened on January 14, 1927, two years before Edward Bok's Bok Tower was completed nearby. Original owners included then-Governor Martin of Florida and silent screen star Thomas Meighan, along with a consortium of other actors/actresses including Mary Pickford, Gloria Swanson and Clara Bow as well as famous Hollywood attorney Nathan Burkan and Hollywood producer Victor Heerman.

The interior of the building was even more ornate than the exterior. It featured shopping arcades, Italian-made ceilings and column capitals, a drinking fountain by Ernest A. Batchelder, Georgia Pink and Vermont Verde antique marble floors by Georgia Marble Company, a wrought iron balustrade, and a central mezzanine. Construction is of steel-reinforced poured concrete in post-and-beam method, without bearing walls.

In the 1970s, the hotel became The Hotel Royal Walesbilt. It was again renamed the Hotel Grand by New York owner Victor Khubani during the 1980s.

On August 31, 1990, the hotel was added to the U.S. National Register of Historic Places.

In 1995, the hotel was sold at auction and closed. The interior was partially dismantled for reconstruction, which was never completed.

The building suffered only superficial damage during the hurricanes of 2004.

In 2010, an agreement was proposed between the City of Lake Wales and developer Ray Brown to restore the hotel.

In 2025, the city took back ownership of the hotel, solicited developers to restore it, and chose Missouri-based Restoration St. Louis in October.
