= Lido Golf Club =

Golf course

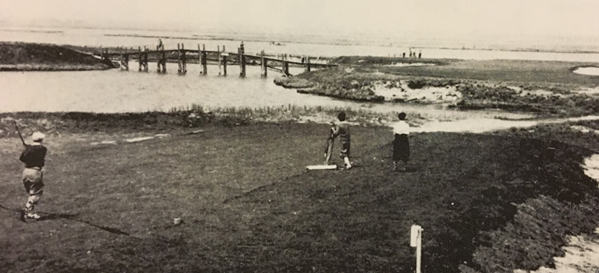
- The original Lido Golf Club's 3rd hole ("Eden")

- Location within the United States Location within New York
- 40°35′19″N 73°38′8″W

Club information
- Location: Lido Beach, New York, U.S.
- Tota holes: 18
- Designed by: Charles B. Macdonald
- Par: 72
- Length: 6,416 yards (5,867 m)

The Lido Golf Club was a golf course in Lido Beach, on the Long Beach Barrier Island, in Nassau County, New York, United States.

== History ==
The Lido was designed by Charles Blair Macdonald, with contributions from other designers, and constructed in 1915. Mr. Macdonald sponsored a contest in Country Life magazine called The Lido Prize. The entries judged by Bernard Darwin, Horace Hutchinson and Herbert Fowler. The winner was Alister MacKenzie.

Overseen by engineer Seth Raynor, construction required that "thousands of pounds of sand" be pumped out of the bay to reclaim what had been a marsh. The advantage was that "the exact contours required by the course architects" could be achieved. Turf bricks were cut from nearby property to lay the greens.

The course opened by the summer of 1917.

More than 2,000,0000 [sic] cubic yards were pumped in from Long Beach channel by five hydraulic dredges. Hills forty feet high and undulations corresponding were thus constructed. Forty thousand cubic yards of meadow muck were lifted and placed as a soil for all the fairways, greens and tees. Among the incidentals more than 2,500 tons of lime, 6,000 tons of fertilizers, and 35,000 tons of top soil. The entire rough was planted by hand with beach grass, each in squares eighteen inches apart. Nearly a million plants were required. They hold the sand in place and at the same time afford an excellent hazard. An irrigation system provides for every foot of the expanse.

Unfortunately, its opening coincided with the United States' entry into World War I. During the summer of 1918, management was forced to lower the annual dues from $200 to $60 and make the course easier to attract more amateur players.

In 1942, during World War II, the United States Navy acquired the property and destroyed the course to construct a naval base. After the war, in 1953, a new course was built in nearby Lido Beach with a design by Robert Trent Jones. While different from the original, the Trent Jones course features a replica of Macdonald's 4th hole.

== Course ==
Regular course
Hole	Name	Yards	Par	Hole	Name	Yards	Par
1	First	361	4	10	Alps	389	4
2	Plateau	398	4	11	Lagoon	393	4
3	Eden	160	3	12	Punch Bowl	412	4
4	Channel	505	5	13	Knoll	283	4
5	Cape	354	4	14	Short	129	3
6	Dog's Leg	477	5	15	Strategy	387	4
7	Hog's Back	455	5	16	Redan	189	3
8	Ocean	220	3	17	Long	548	5
9	Leven	334	4	18	Home	405	4
Out		3,264	37	In		3,152	35
Source:				Total		6,416	72

The Lido provided a championship, a regular, and a short course.

== Reception ==
In 1921, Walter Hagen listed the Lido as one of golf's "Big Three" courses, along with the National Links, and Pine Valley. An assessment after completion described the course as "the greatest test in the world, with the possible exception of Pine Valley."

On two holes at high tide the surf scatters spray over the greens, while the ocean seems scarcely more than a drive, a brassey and approach from any of the tees. The course proper covers 115 acres, over seven of which flows the lagoon, an artificial lake dredged twelve feet deep with made-land in the centre constituting the island hole.... The home hole was built after the design of the best of more than one hundred plans submitted in a prize contest conducted in England for the best two-shot stretch.

== Legacy ==
In 2021, Michael and Chris Keiser, operators of Sand Valley Golf Resort in Nekoosa, Wisconsin undertook to construct a replica of the Lido in the Wisconsin sand barrens. Golf historian Peter Flory spent years studying the original course's design and created a virtual, 3-D computer simulation. Impressed by Flory's photorealistic model, Keiser hired architect Tom Doak to bring the replica to life. It opened in May 2023, and was announced as the primary course for the 2026 U.S. Mid-Amateur and the 2029 U.S. Junior Amateur.

Another Lido-inspired course opened in 2022 at Ban Rakat Club near Bangkok, Thailand. Designed by architect Gil Hanse alongside business partner Jim Wagner, Ballyshear Golf Links features 18 holes reinterpreted to fit the site's landscape.
