= Tavern Acres Historic District =

Historic district in Massachusetts, United States

- U.S. National Register of Historic Places
- U.S. Historic district
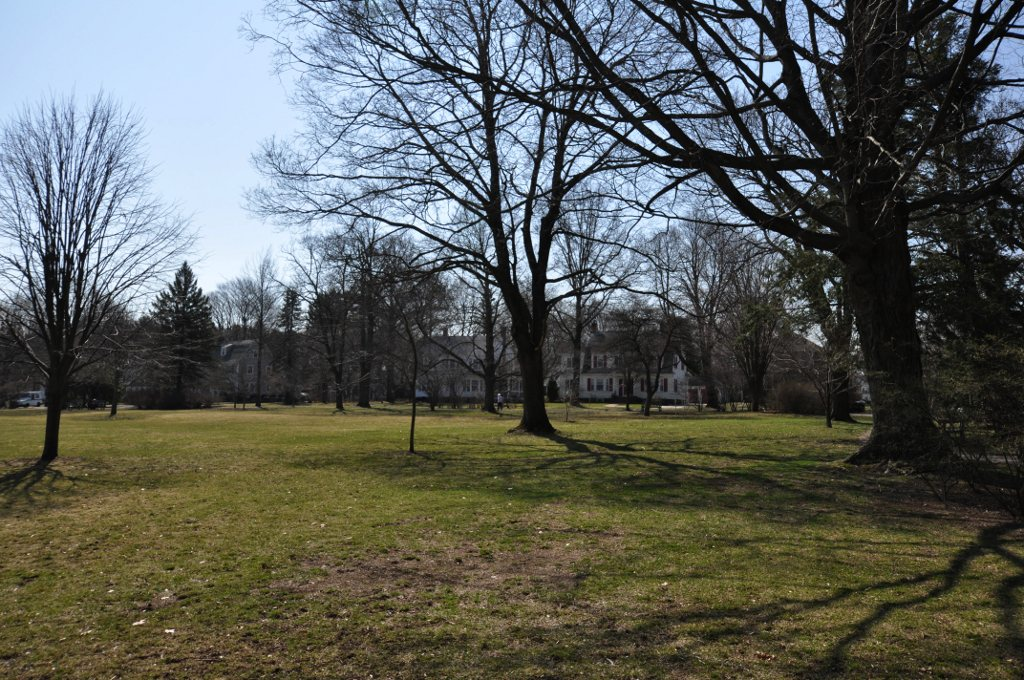
- Memorial Park

- Location within Massachusetts Location within the United States
- Location: North Andover, Massachusetts
- Coordinates: 42°41′42″N 71°7′34″W
- Area: 9 acres (3.6 ha)
- Built: 1907
- Architect: Henry Vincent Hubbard, Charles Wait
- Architectural style: Colonial Revival, Romanesque, Bungalow/Craftsman
- NRHP reference No.: 95001134
- Added to NRHP: September 29, 1995

The Tavern Acres Historic District encompasses a residential development known as Tavern Acres, which was built in the 1920s with a landscape design by Henry Vincent Hubbard, then with the Olmsted Brothers landscape design firm. It is bounded by Bradstreet Rd., Green and Main Sts. and Park Way in North Andover, Massachusetts. The district encompasses Memorial Park, the Stevens Library, and properties facing Memorial Park and further along Bradstreet Road. The district was listed on the National Register of Historic Places in 1995.

== Description and history ==
The Tavern Acres development is set in a suburban residential area of northern North Andover. Main Street, the eastern boundary is a major north-south road, and Green Street is a collector road running through the residential area. The northernmost part of the district is the triangular intersection of these two streets and Davis Street, in which the Stevents Library stands. The Davis Street stretch is functionally part of the library's parking area. South of the library, across Davis Street, stands Memorial Park, a five-sided grassy area about 2.75 acres (1.11 ha) in size. At its northern end, near the library, is the Patriots Monument, which honors North Andover's military personnel.

Bradstreet Road defines the southern boundary of Memorial Park. Ringing the north, east, and south sides of the park, and extending east along Bradstreet Road are a collection of houses that were all built as part of the initial Tavern Acres development. This development had its origin in a series of land acquisitions in the 1860s by Moses Tyler Stevens, whose family owned many mills in the area. In 1904 Stevens donated land and funds for construction of the library, which was completed in 1907, after his death, and was named in his honor. Stevens' heirs sought to develop the remainder of the 20-acre (8.1 ha) parcel, and retained the famed Olmsted Brothers landscape firm to lay out the master plan. The Tavern Land Company, formed by the heirs to manage this development, contracted with Charles R. Waite of E. M. Parsons to design most of the houses that it built before the company dissolved in 1924. Only twenty houses were built by the partnership and are included in the district. These houses are general 2-1/2 story wood frame structures, in Colonial Revival, Dutch Colonial, and Craftsman styles. Fourteen of the properties include garages as part of the original plan, which are considered contributing elements to the district. The houses and properties are organized to have a certain degree of uniformity in setting and scale.

== See also ==
- National Register of Historic Places listings in Essex County, Massachusetts
