= Fishers Island Club =

Country club in New York

- Location within the United States Location within New York
- 41°16′48″N 71°56′51″W

Club information
- Location: Fishers Island, NY
- Established: 1926
- Type: Private
- Total holes: 18
- Website: www.fishersislandclub.com
- Designed by: Seth Raynor; Charles Banks
- Par: 72
- Length: 6,616 yards
- Course rating: 72.0

The Fishers Island Club is a country club located near the eastern end of Fishers Island in New York. The club includes an eighteen-hole golf course designed by Seth Raynor that was ranked ninth in the 2023 Golf Digest list of America's 100 Greatest Golf Courses.

== Description ==
The golf course has been called the "Cypress Point of the East" and is also referred to by its members as "The Big Club" to distinguish it from the Hay Harbor Club, another country club on the western part of the island with a nine-hole golf course. The course opened in July 1926, a few months after the death of its architect, Seth Raynor. Charles Banks, an associate of Raynor, completed the work on the course after the unexpected death of Raynor in January 1926. Banks went on to finish several of Raynor's other ongoing projects and designed other courses on his own before he died in March 1931. Most of the holes have water views of Block Island Sound or Fishers Island Sound. Like his mentor Charles B. Macdonald, Raynor patterned many of the holes after classic designs at other courses including the Alps, Biarritz, Cape, Double Plateau, Eden, Punchbowl, Redan and Short.

The golf course was a key component of the development of 1,600 acres (650 ha) of land on the east end of Fishers Island into a new community for summer residents in the mid-1920s. Real estate developer Frederick S. Ruth was engaged by Fishers Island Farms, Inc. to explore the feasibility of creating the new development. He endorsed the proposal and recommended the hiring of Frederick Law Olmsted Jr. to plan the residential subdivision and Seth Raynor to design the golf course. Ruth, Olmsted, and Raynor had all previously worked together on the design of a new residential community with a golf course in Mountain Lake, Florida. The scale of the residential development envisioned in Olmsted's plan was never fully realized due to the effects of the Wall Street Crash of 1929.

The club originally had a massive Norman Farmhouse-style clubhouse that was designed by architect Charles R. Wait of Boston. In 1933, the clubhouse served as a temporary home for students from the Ethel Walker School after a fire had destroyed two of the dormitories used by girls at the preparatory school in Connecticut. During World War II, the building was leased to the United States Navy and used as a training school. By 1963, the clubhouse was operating with an annual deficit of more than $50,000 and the club's Board of Governors decided to demolish the structure as a cost-cutting measure. It was intentionally destroyed by a fire set on September 19, 1963 after an attempt to blow up the structure using dynamite earlier that month proved to be unsuccessful.

The country club also has five tennis courts and a beach club.
