= House at 6 Adams Street =

Historic house in Massachusetts, United States

- U.S. National Register of Historic Places
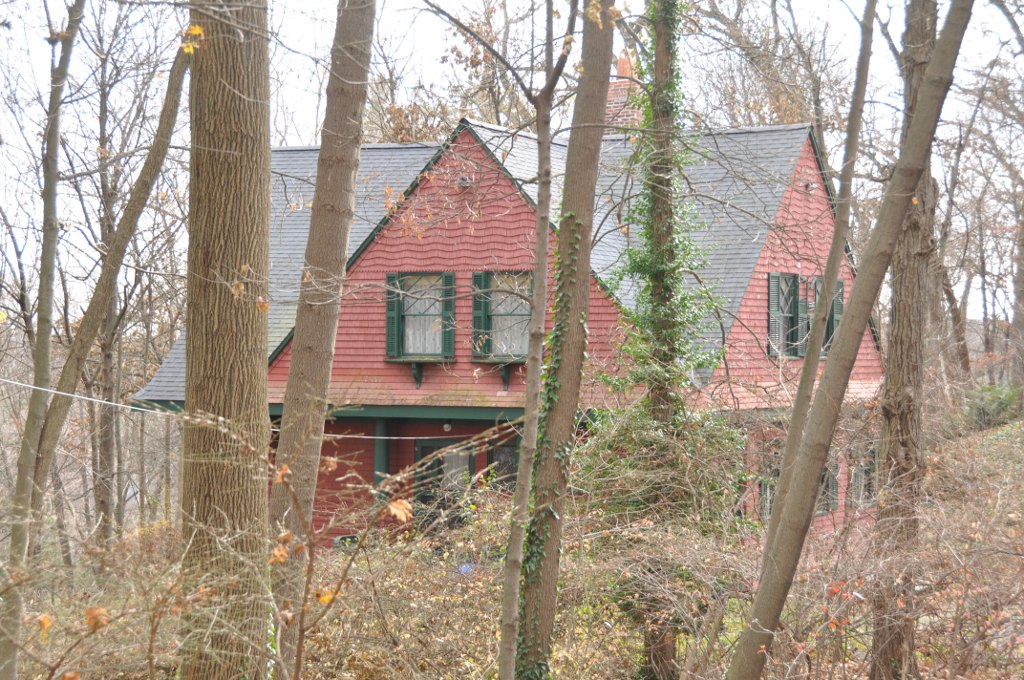

- Location within Massachusetts Location within the United States
- Location: 6 Adams St., Wakefield, Massachusetts
- Coordinates: 42°30′7″N 71°5′13″W
- Area: 1.36 acres (0.55 ha)
- Built: 1886
- Architect: Robert Pote Wait
- Architectural style: Shingle Style
- MPS: Wakefield MRA
- NRHP reference No.: 89000721
- Added to NRHP: July 6, 1989

The House at 6 Adams Street in Wakefield, Massachusetts is one of the best examples of shingle style architecture in the town. It was designed by Boston architect Robert Pote Wait and built in 1885–1886 to be his own home. It was listed on the National Register of Historic Places in 1989.

== Description and history ==
6 Adams Street stands in a residential area west of Wakefield center, on the south side of Adams Street, a short cul-de-sac off Chestnut Street. It is set on a wooded parcel about 1.3 acres (0.53 ha) in size. It is a 2 1/2-story wood-frame structure, with a cross-gabled roof configuration and wooden shingled exterior. The shingling is cut in a number of different ways, including waves, diamond patterns, and straight. The roof extends to the top of the first floor and has a flared eave which is shingled below the gable ends. Upper-level windows are set in openings framed by shutters, with a bracketed shelf at their bases. Most windows are sash, with the upper sashes featuring diamond panes. The entry is set under a recessed porch, with shingled posts flaring at the top to support the overhang.

The area where the house was built is known as Wakefield Park, and was planned as a subdivision of upper middle class residences. It was completed in 1886 to a design by Boston architect Robert Pote Wait, whose residence it became. Subsequent owners Grace and Hubbard Mansfield hired Charles R. Wait to design modernizations to the building, including the provision of heat, gas lighting, and plumbing. Hubbard Mansfield was one of Wakefield's first town planners.

== See also ==
- National Register of Historic Places listings in Wakefield, Massachusetts
- National Register of Historic Places listings in Middlesex County, Massachusetts
