= Blue Mound Golf & Country Club =

Country club in Wauwatosa, Wisconsin

- Location within the United States Location within Wisconsin
- 43.0675°N 88.041°W

Club information
- Location: Wauwatosa, Wisconsin, U.S.
- Elevation: 700 feet (215 m)
- Established: 1926; 100 years ago
- Type: Private
- Total holes: 18
- Website: bluemoundgcc.com
- Designed by: Seth Raynor
- Par: 70
- Length: 6,672 yards (6,101 m)
- Course rating: 72.0
- Slope rating: 131

Blue Mound Golf & Country Club is a country club in the north central United States, located in Wauwatosa, Wisconsin, a suburb west of Milwaukee. The golf course was designed by Seth Raynor.

The club hosted the PGA Championship in 1933, the Western Open in 1916, and the Women's Western Open in 1940, where Babe Zaharias defeated Mrs. Russell Mann in the 36-hole final of match play, 5 and 4. In the late 1990s, the course was restored by Tom Doak's Renaissance Design under the supervision of architect Bruce Hepner.

Blue Mound hosted the 2010 Western Junior, won by Patrick Rogers. It was also the second course for the first two rounds of the U.S. Amateur in 2011; the primary venue was Erin Hills, site of the U.S. Open in 2017.
