= Chalet Suzanne =

- U.S. National Register of Historic Places
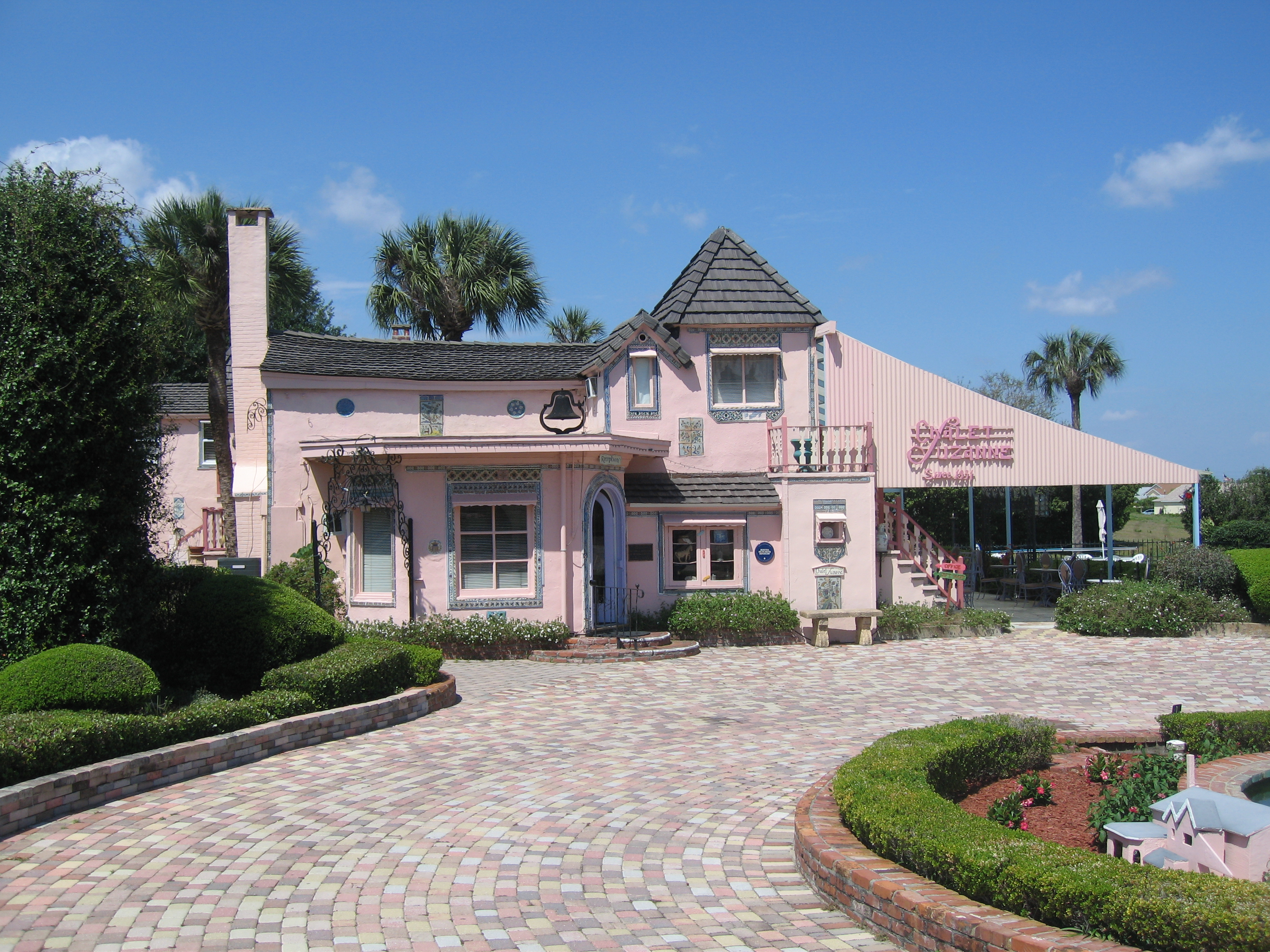
- Chalet Suzanne

- Location within Florida Location within the United States
- Location: 3800 Chalet Suzanne Drive; Lake Wales, Florida
- Coordinates: 27°57′25″N 81°35′55″W
- NRHP reference No.: 90001085
- Added to NRHP: 24 July 1990

Chalet Suzanne (once known as the Carleton Club) is a historic site in Lake Wales, Florida. It is located at 3800 Chalet Suzanne Drive. On July 24, 1990, it was added to the U.S. National Register of Historic Places.

Originally envisioned as a magnificent residential resort appealing to people who enjoyed golf and tennis, the Carleton Club was a vision of cheese baron James L. Kraft and Carl and Bertha Hinshaw. Kraft soon bowed out of the enterprise. When Carl Hinshaw died in 1931, Bertha Hinshaw opened her home as a restaurant and inn to travelers, serving exotic recipes on fine china that she had gathered around the world. Among those who visited and helped to publicize the restaurant and inn was Duncan Hines. Other famous guests have included Burt Reynolds, Dinah Shore, Robert Redford, Johnny Carson, Kevin Costner and Don Johnson.

In 1943 the Chalet was largely destroyed by fire. Hinshaw quickly rebuilt it using salvaged parts from the horse stables, a game room, servants’ quarters and a chicken house. This unusual design had 14 different levels.

In 1956, Carl Hinshaw Jr. opened a cannery on the property for the restaurant's famous soups, including their signature romaine. The soups became very popular, selling worldwide. Chalet Suzanne soup went with the astronauts to the moon during the Apollo 15 and 16 flights.

The Chalet has been featured in many publications, among them The New Yorker, Vogue, Life, Better Homes and Gardens, Cosmopolitan, National Geographic, Forbes and Time magazines. Bertha Louise Hinshaw died in 1973 at the age of 90; the Chalet continues under the ownership and management of the Hinshaw family.

On July 10, 2014, it was announced that with the retirement of the Hinshaw family, the Chalet would close on or about August 4. The business and property are up for sale as a result. In May 2016, current owners Eric and Dee Hinshaw stated they had turned down offers from property developers who wanted to build houses in the hopes that someone with a "grand vision for the property" would purchase it. It currently serves as a faith-based addiction rehabilitation center for men called Refuge on the Ridge. The Hinshaws, who still live on the property, were inspired to put the property to this use after their own son's successful addiction rehabilitation through a similar program in south Florida.
