= Ste Anne des Lacs =

Shrine in Florida, United States

Coordinates: 27.877275°N 81.489124°W

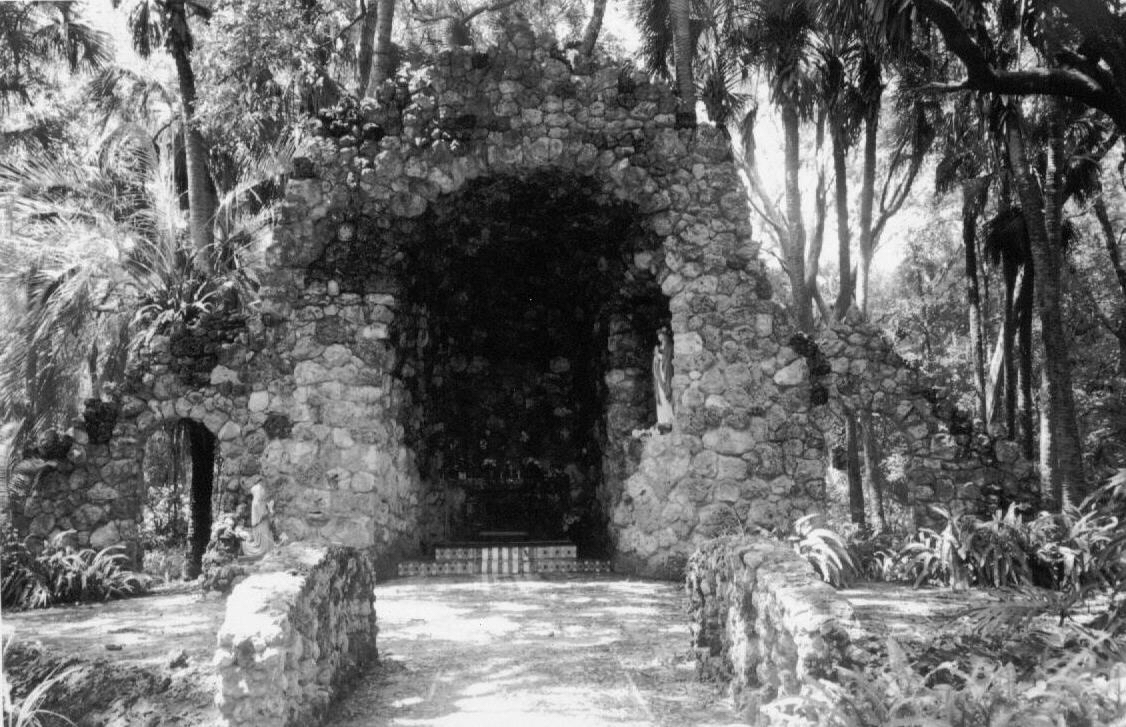
Ste Anne des Lacs

St. Anne des Lacs was a rural shrine built about 1920 by French-speaking Catholics on Lake St. Anne, a lake of about 15 acres (6 ha), located about six miles (10 km) east of Lake Wales, Florida and 1.5 miles (2.4 km) south of S.R. 60. It was built of stone, a rare and rarely used material in Florida. The shrine included the church, and an elaborate set of statuary which made up the Stations of the Cross, and which were spread through the surrounding woods on a set of trails. A statue of Saint Anne stood in the lake itself on a raised stone platform, creating a very evocative scene.

== History ==
Pilgrimages were made to the shrine from throughout the state, and thousands of people crowded the narrow road from the highway to the small lake, often parking a great distance away and walking to the shrine. This shrine, which was complete with tableaux and scenes of the Holy Land in murals, sculpture and paintings, would also host the Feast of Saint Anne on July 26 and thousands would attend this event and Mardi Gras was also hosted here.

The story of St. Anne's Shrine goes like this:

A man from Canada, (believed to be Napoleon Pelletier) came down to Florida with his very sick son. His son had been diagnosed as terminally ill. In search of warmer climate, French Canadians had traveled here to escape severe winters and the first pilgrimage was in 1928. While traveling in Florida, they came upon the little lake at what is now St. Anne's. They swam and camped there and the boy's condition improved, and he was miraculously cured. His cure was attributed to the healing waters, and so the man single-handedly built a shrine to St. Anne, a popular Canadian saint associated with water, in an oak hammock next to the lake. During World War II, the once flock of French Canadians could no longer visit this shrine as a result of the war closing it and another concern was commercialism, all of this combined eventually declined the church. Plans of reopening the church were considered but, again, commercialism was a concern and the plans never fully formed. Under disputed and mysterious circumstances, the church caught fire and burned to the ground in 1942. Several stone walls, and the original steps of the church remain.

The shrine was de-sanctified by the Diocese of St. Augustine in the 1960s, and most of the shrine was removed to prevent vandalism. Some historical traces remain. Although the shrine now closed, the Catholic Diocese of Orlando still owned the land and when, in 1981, a priest attempted to sell the land to build a home, locals protested and the land was preserved. Saint Anne is more common in France and this is the only place in Florida with Saint Anne relics. The shrine nowadays is still very common on postcards and, in 2002, the Lakeland Ledger said of the shrine: "Historically speaking, it might be one of the most unique religious sites in Central Florida".
