= Grassy Lake Preserve =

Coordinates: 27.922°N 81.600°W

Grassy Lake Preserve officially known as Mountain Lake Cut-Off, is 185 acres (0.75 km^{2}) of preserve purchased by the State of Florida in 2003 for $2.1 million in order to protect eight rare species of plants and one rare species of animal. It is located at U.S. 27 and Mountain Lake Cut-Off Road in Lake Wales, Florida). The property is managed by the Florida Fish and Wildlife Conservation Commission as part of a network of preserves along the Lake Wales Ridge.

The preserve is located behind Janie Howard Wilson Elementary School.
