= Charles Blair Macdonald =

American golf pioneer (1855–1939)

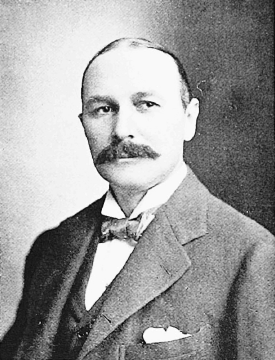
- Macdonald in 1895

Personal information
- Full name: Charles Blair Macdonald
- Nationality: United States
- Born: November 14, 1855 Niagara Falls, Ontario, Canada
- Died: April 21, 1939 (aged 83)

Career
- Sport: Golf
- Status: Amateur

Best results in major championships (wins: 1)
- Masters Tournament: DNP
- PGA Championship: DNP
- U.S. Open: T11: 1897
- The Open Championship: DNP
- U.S. Amateur: Won: 1895
- British Amateur: R128: 1906

Achievements and awards
- World Golf Hall of Fame: 2007 (member page)
- Canadian Golf Hall of Fame: 2025

Charles Blair Macdonald (November 14, 1855 – April 21, 1939) was a major figure in early American golf. He built the first 18-hole course in the United States, was a driving force in the founding of the United States Golf Association, won the first U.S. Amateur championship, and later built some of the most influential golf courses in the United States, to the extent that he is considered the father of American golf course design. He is a member of the World Golf Hall of Fame.

== Early years ==
Macdonald was born in Niagara Falls, Ontario, to naturalized American parents — a Scottish father and Canadian (part Mohawk) mother — and grew up in Chicago. In 1872 at age 16, he was sent to St Andrews University, and while there he voraciously played golf. Tutored by Old Tom Morris, Macdonald soon became proficient enough that he played matches on the Old Course at St Andrews against several of the leading golfers of the day, including Young Tom Morris. Macdonald returned to Chicago in 1874 and became a successful stockbroker, but rarely played golf for the next 17 years (a period he termed the "Dark Ages").

== United States Golf Association ==
In 1894, the Newport Country Club and Saint Andrew's Golf Club both held "national championship" tournaments. Macdonald finished second in both, and on both occasions he angrily denounced the manner in which each competition was held, with the result that both tournaments were declared unofficial. That fall, delegates from the Chicago Golf Club (including Macdonald), Saint Andrew's, The Country Club, Newport Country Club, and Shinnecock Hills Golf Club met in New York City to resolve the problem. The result was the formation of the United States Golf Association (USGA), which would administer the official championship. Macdonald was named Vice President of the organization. The first U.S. Amateur was held in 1895 at the Newport Country Club, and this time Macdonald won, beating Charles Sands 12 & 11 in the final (which is still the record winning margin).

== Course design ==
By the late 1880s, a group of Scottish immigrants had brought the game to the New York City area, playing at the Saint Andrew's Golf Club. In 1892, Macdonald convinced several associates to begin playing. Shortly thereafter, he founded the Chicago Golf Club. At first, Macdonald built nine rudimentary holes in Downers Grove, Illinois; these nine holes comprised the first golf course west of the Allegheny Mountains.

In 1893, he expanded the course to 18 holes, creating the first full-length course in the United States. Shortly thereafter, in 1894, the Chicago Golf Club decided to move to a permanent home in nearby Wheaton, Illinois. Macdonald built a new 18-hole course there, a layout that is still the club's home today and has hosted multiple U.S. Opens, continuing to rank as one of the top 50 golf courses in the world. (The original 1892 site is now the Belmont Golf Club). In 1895, he designed the first nine holes at Onwentsia Club of Lake Forest, Illinois, and also laid out (along with H.J.Whigham and Herbert Tweedie) the first nine holes at Exmoor Country Club of Highland Park, Illinois.

In 1900, Macdonald left Chicago to live in New York, becoming a partner in the Wall Street brokerage firm of C.D. Barney (through mergers, now Morgan Stanley Wealth Management). With only a couple of exceptions, most golf courses in the U.S. at that time were laid out in rudimentary fashion, with little strategy required of the golfer. Macdonald, by virtue of his experiences at St Andrews and later trips to Great Britain, was determined (not immodestly) to build the most noteworthy course outside the British Isles. He searched Long Island for a suitable site to emulate the classic seaside links of Scotland, and eventually settled on a site in Southampton, New York (near Shinnecock Hills Golf Club) in 1906. He dubbed the Southampton home at 119 Whites Lane "Ballyshear" and the house was designed by F. Burrall Hoffman. The home was purchased by Michael Bloomberg in 2011.

In 1908, he organized a group of 70 founders to contribute $1,000 each, and the National Golf Links of America opened for play in 1909. Many of the holes were his versions of famous holes from British courses, a pattern he would repeat on later courses. Macdonald would tweak the course for the rest of his life, altering every hole somewhat over the next 30 years. The course hosted the inaugural Walker Cup in 1922, and is considered a landmark of golf architecture even today. In 2005, Golf Digest ranked it the #9 course in the United States.

With the National Golf Links course, Macdonald began collaborating with Seth Raynor, who would later become a famous golf architect (a term coined by Macdonald in about 1910) in his own right. The pair would collaborate on a number of courses over the years. These included the Old White Course at The Greenbrier (1914), St. Louis Country Club (1914), the Shinnecock Hills Golf Course (1916), the Yale University golf course (1926), and the Mid Ocean Club in Bermuda, a course conceived to escape the reach of Prohibition (1921). One of the most famous was the Lido Golf Club (1914), a course which took an enormous amount of effort to construct and had several unique holes, and was considered at least on par with the National Golf Links while it existed (a course by the same name exists near its location today, but it was built by Robert Trent Jones in 1947). Macdonald sponsored a competition to design a hole that would be used at The Lido Golf Club. Country Life Magazine published and promoted the Lido Prize and it was judged by columnists Bernard Darwin, Horace Hutchinson and Herbert Fowler. The winner was Alister MacKenzie.

In 1928, Macdonald published his book Scotland's Gift: Golf, which covers the spread of golf (prominently featuring himself) in the United States from its beginnings in the early 1890s to 1927, when there were some 4,000 courses in the country. It devotes several chapters to four of his courses, and gives his design philosophy. He is often called the "Father of American Golf Architecture".

=== Macdonald's Template Hole Designs ===
MacDonald identified 21 hole designs or templates from the greatest holes in the British Isles that would test a great player's game while allowing mediocre and poor players angles and options to score well. These template holes are typically pretty easy to identify after a little schooling. While these holes are similar from course to course, they are not duplicates. Each hole was designed specifically for the site to create a unique twist for players. Several of MacDonald's classic templates are:

- Alps
- Double Plateau
- Road Hole
- Eden
- Biarritz
- Cape Hole
- Redan Hole
- Short Hole

== Courses ==
Some of Macdonald’s courses remain largely unaltered (St. Louis Country Club), some have been substantially redesigned (Shinnecock Hills Golf Club), and some are defunct (Lido Golf Club). They include:

Bermuda

- Mid Ocean Club – Tuckers Town (1921)

Connecticut

- Yale Golf Course – New Haven (1926)

Florida

- Palm Beach Winter Golf Club (original)– Palm Beach (1927)

Illinois

- Downers Grove Golf Course – Downers Grove (1892)
- Chicago Golf Club – Wheaton (1895)
- Onwentsia Club – Lake Forest (1896)
- Exmoor Country Club (first 9 holes) - Highland Park (1897)

Maryland

- Gibson Island Club – Gibson Island (1922)

Missouri

- St. Louis Country Club (1914)

New Jersey

- Morris County Golf Club (1916)

New York

- Blind Brook Club – Purchase (1915)
- The Creek – Locust Valley (1925)
- Deepdale Golf Club (original) – Manhasset (1924)
- Lido Golf Club (original) – Lido Beach (1914)
- National Golf Links of America – Southampton (1909)
- The Links Golf Club – Manhasset, NY (1918)
- North Shore Country Club – Glen Head NY (1916)
- Piping Rock Club – Locust Valley (1911)
- Shinnecock Hills Golf Club (original) – Southampton (1916)
- Sleepy Hollow Country Club (18 hole & 9 hole) – Scarborough (1914)

West Virginia

- The Greenbrier, The Old White Course – White Sulphur Springs (1914)

== Honors ==
In 2007, Macdonald was elected as a member of the World Golf Hall of Fame in the Lifetime Achievement category. In 2025, Macdonald was inducted into the Canadian Golf Hall of Fame.

== Major championships ==
=== Amateur wins (1) ===
Year	Championship	Winning score	Runner-up
1895	U.S. Amateur	12 & 11	(United States) Charles Sands

=== Results timeline ===
Tournament	1895	1896	1897	1898	1899
U.S. Open		WD	T11		
U.S. Amateur	1	R16	SF M	SF	SF M
The Amateur Championship					

Tournament	1900	1901	1902	1903	1904	1905	1906	1907	1908	1909
U.S. Open	29		53							
U.S. Amateur		R16			DNQ	R32				DNQ
The Amateur Championship							R128			

Tournament	1910	1911	1912
U.S. Open			
U.S. Amateur	DNQ		DNQ
The Amateur Championship			

Win
Top 10
Did not play

M = Medalist
WD = Withdrew
"T" indicates a tie for a place
DNQ = Did not qualify for match play portion
R256, R128, R64, R32, R16, QF, SF = Round in which player lost in match play.

Source for U.S. Open and U.S. Amateur: USGA Championship Database

Source for 1906 British Amateur: Golf, July 1906, pg. 29.
