= Yeamans Hall Club =

Country club near Charleston, South Carolina, United States

Coordinates: 32.92639°N 79.97797°W

- Interactive map of Yeamans Hall Club

Club information
- Location: Hanahan, South Carolina, U.S.
- Established: 1924
- Tota holes: 18
- Designed by: Seth Raynor

Yeamans Hall Club is a country club built on a 1100-acre tract about 12 miles from Charleston, South Carolina, in the town of Hanahan, South Carolina. It is located along the Cooper River on the site of a 17th-century plantation.

== Plantation ==
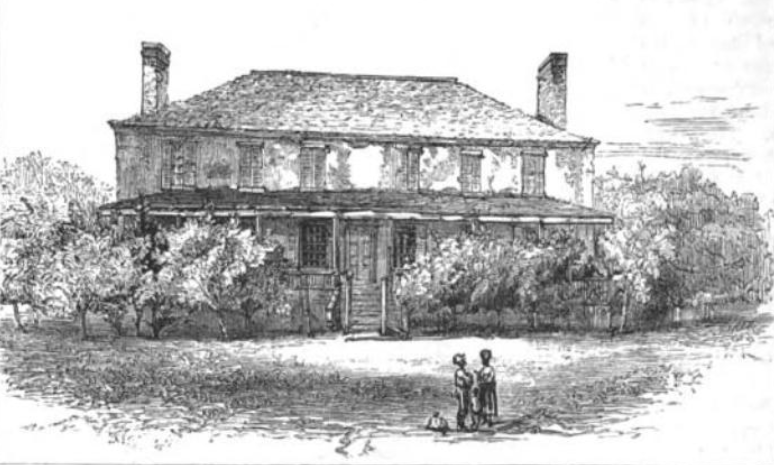
Although in ruins years earlier, an 1864 image of the intact house was published in 1875 in Harper's Magazine.

The club was built on a plantation that had initially belong to Lady Margaret Yeamans, the wife of Sir John Yeamans who was a Royal governor, in 1674. When her husband died, Lady Yeamans remarried to William Walley, and they had a plantation, possibly Yeamans Hall, in operation as a working plantation. Before 1704, the plantation passed to the second Landgrave Thomas Smith who, in 1738, devised this "brick house or family mansion at Goose Creek" and five hundred acres to his son. The elegant house was already gone by 1812 when the author of an 1855 book first visited the site.

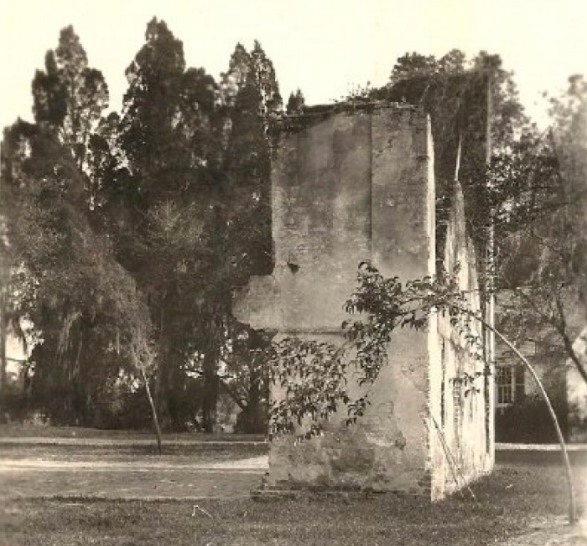
The plantation at Yeamans Hall was in ruins by 1812 but remains were still present into the 20th century.

== Country club ==
The plan for a winter colony development originated with W.E. Durant. The charter for the company was granted in December 1924. Upon opening, the club included only limited facilities including guest cottages for visiting members; in December 1926, the club announced that a clubhouse would be designed by James Gamble Rogers, the club's architect.

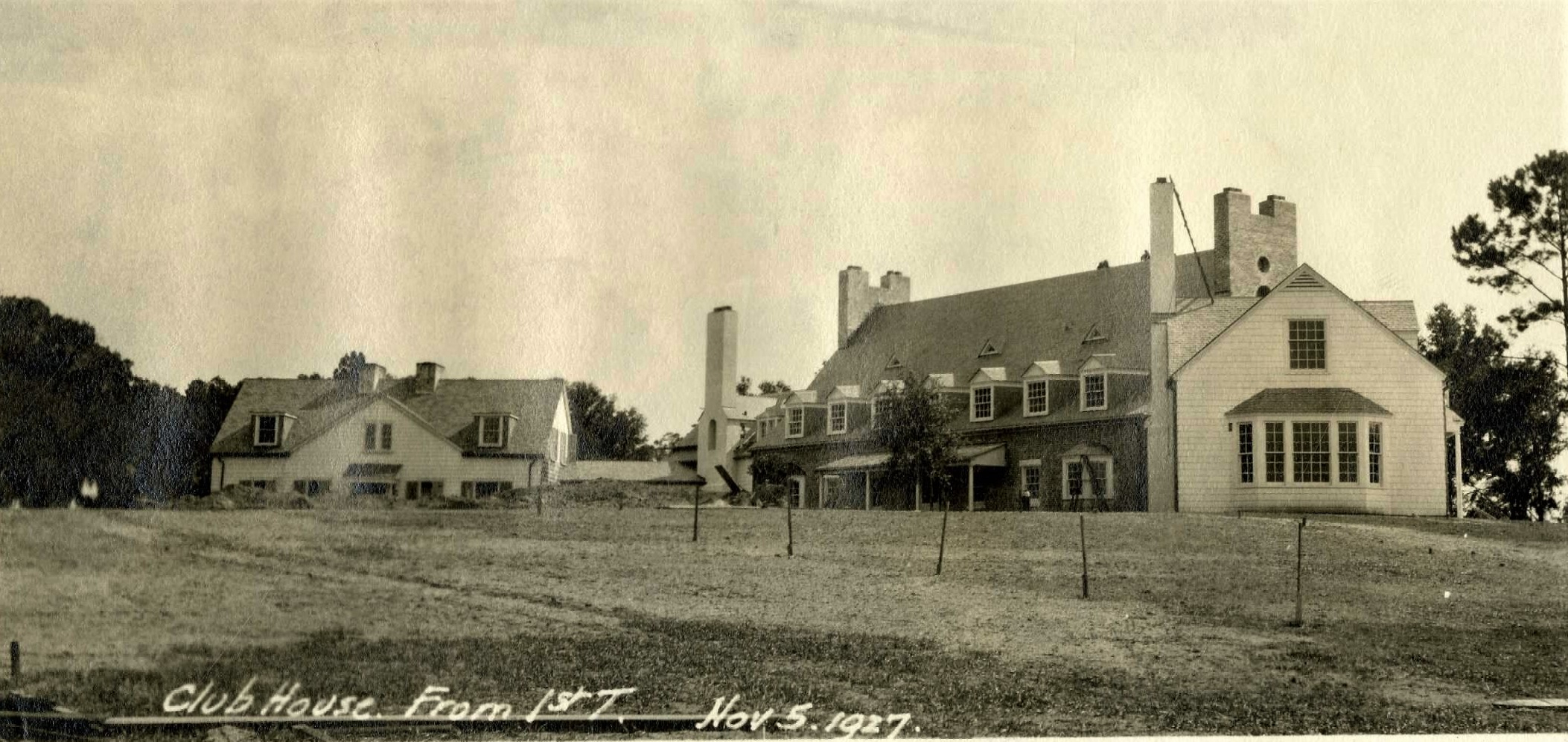
The clubhouse was built in the 1920s in the Colonial style that was used throughout the community.

The club was designed to attract wealthy Northern financial men to Charleston in the fall and winter with 200 to 300 house sites; the club was not intended to attract regular tourists and privacy and exclusivity were always hallmarks. The club's initial members were heavily drawn from New York's industrial and financial circles with five members from Charleston. The membership of the charter members cost $3000 while the next fifty paid $4000 and $5000 for the following fifty members.

James Gamble Rogers followed a strictly Southern colonial style, and James O'Hear was the contractor. The Olmsted Brothers landscaping firm was used.

Construction began on the temporary clubhouse in 1925 (planned to later serve as a wing of a larger clubhouse), but the plans would have originally called for the removal of the remnants of the historic house. Two members who were visiting the new club objected to the destruction of the historic house and called for the location of the clubhouse to be shifted to accommodate the old house. By 1930, the facilities included the larger, final clubhouse; 25 houses; a service garage; housing for some of the staff; and guest cottages for members to use. In 1931, the number of houses increased to 33. By the time an additional staff housing building was added in 1937, a thirty-fourth house had been built. By 1961, there were thirty-eight houses. The club bought an adjacent 120-acre tract of timberland in 1937 at the cost of $12,000.

== Golf course ==
Construction of the first 18-hole golf course, designed by Seth Raynor, began on July 1, 1925, following a trip to Charleston by Raynor. The golf course was about 6400 yards when it was completed, roughly evenly split before the front and back nine holes. The course was completed in June 1925. After time for plantings to take hold, the first golf was played by former New Jersey senator Joseph S. Frelinghuysen Jr., an early member of the club, who played a few holes with his guest Henry R. Sutphan, the president of the Electric Boat Company, on November 7, 1925.

== Course layout ==
Yeamans Hall Club
Tee	Rating/Slope	1	2	3	4	5	6	7	8	9	Out	10	11	12	13	14	15	16	17	18	In	Total
Rust	72.8/134	423	374	144	494	417	186	428	427	527	3420	361	410	358	196	409	448	227	422	532	3363	6783
Yellow	70.7/130	397	345	127	410	391	173	409	402	508	3162	339	392	336	161	392	425	194	387	504	3130	6292
Par	Par	4	4	3	4	4	3	4	4	5	35	4	4	4	3	4	4	3	4	5	35	70
SI	Handicap	9	15	17	5	1	7	3	11	13		8	6	12	14	4	2	16	10	18

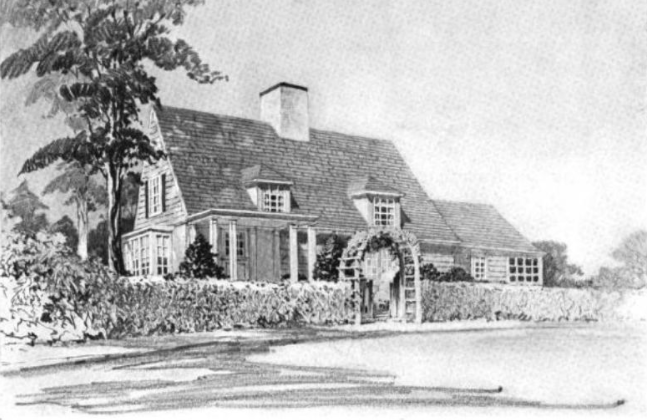
A sample of the houses planned for Yeamans Hall was included in the club prospectus in the 1920s.
