= Palm Beach Winter Club =

- U.S. National Register of Historic Places
- Location within Florida Location within the United States
- Location: North Palm Beach, Florida
- Coordinates: 26°49′34″N 80°3′43″W
- Architect: Louis de Puyseger of Paris, France, builder: Arnold Bros., Inc.
- NRHP reference No.: 80000960
- Added to NRHP: August 1, 1980

The Palm Beach Winter Club is a historic site in North Palm Beach, Florida, United States. It is located on U.S. 1. It was once the home of Sir Harry Oakes, and later became the clubhouse of the village-owned golf course. On August 1, 1980, it was added to the National Register of Historic Places. In 1984, the building was torn down.
