= Ryan Shakes =

American social media personality (born 2001)

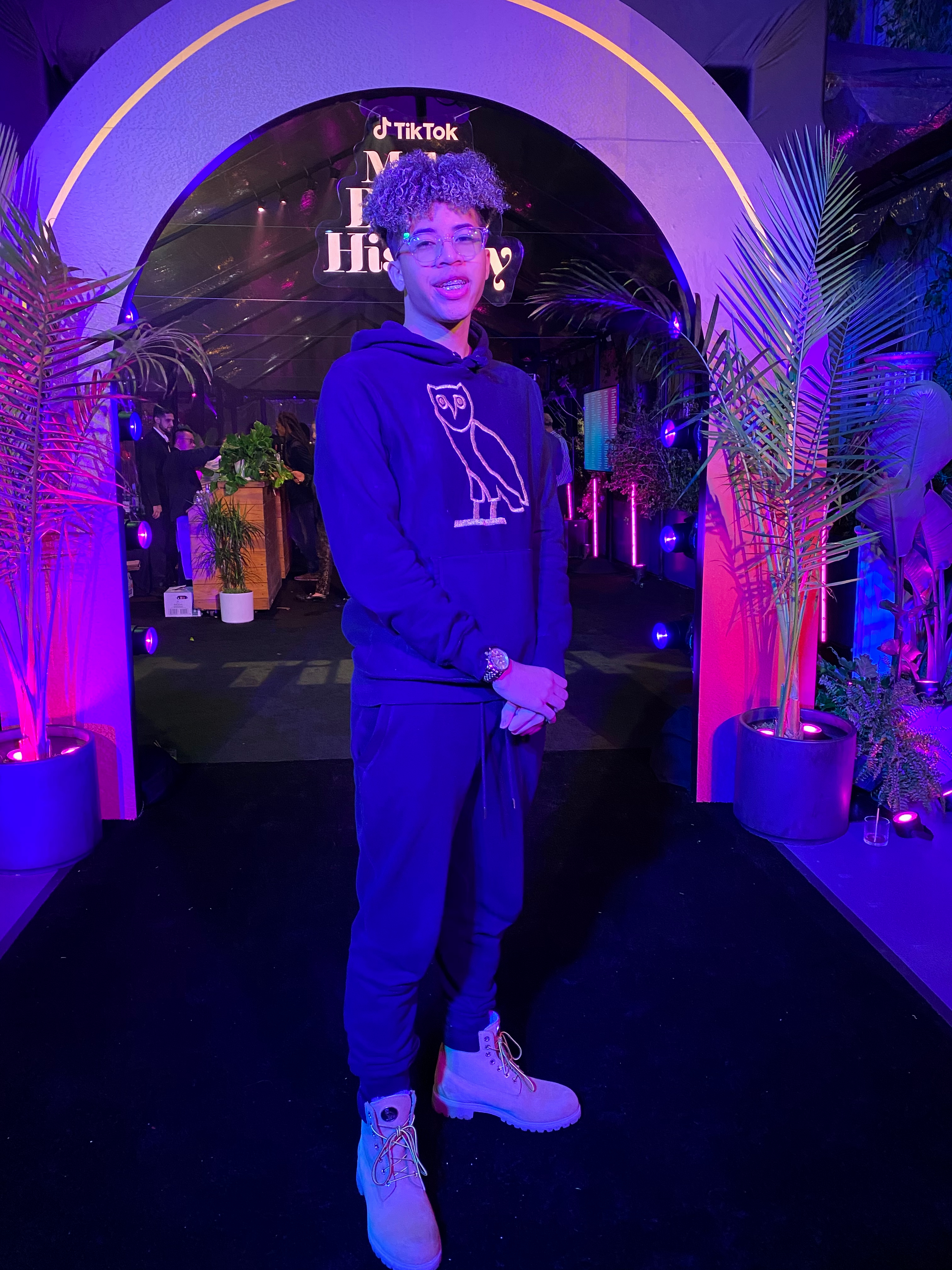
- Shakes in 2020
- Born: Ryan Wayne Shakes; December 3, 2001 (age 23); West Palm Beach, Florida, U.S.
- Occupations: Social media personality; actor; businessman
- Years active: 2016–present
- Known for: TikTok

TikTok information
- Pages: Ryan Shakes; itzryanshakes; shakeyfam
- Followers: 8.2 million (combined)
- Last updated: September 2023
- Website: ryanshakes.com

Ryan Wayne Shakes (born December 3, 2001) is an American social media personality. After creating content on Musical.ly at a young age, Shakes gained a following on the latter's predecessor, TikTok, where he has over 6 million followers as of May 2023.

== Early life ==
Shakes grew up in West Palm Beach and Lake Wales, Florida. He has a younger sister, Zayla Shakes, who often makes TikTok content with him.

At age nine, Shakes bought a fourth generation iPod Touch with his own money, on which he discovered YouTube. He subsequently created his first channel on the site, posting comedic skits and videos filmed around his house, although these videos did not gain traction.

Shakes started his first business in middle school, selling bags of gummy worms to classmates, and used the money he made to buy an iPad, softbox lights and a tripod for filming YouTube videos. He has said, "I didn't grow up rich, so I was always looking for ways to make money."

== Career ==
Shakes started a second YouTube channel in 2014, where he posted technology reviews, which saw more engagement than his previous attempt. In 2016, while still in high school, Shakes began posting to the app Musical.ly. He gained a wider following after the app's acquisition and merger into TikTok, reaching 500,000 followers by early 2019, one million the following summer, and over two million by his junior year. In the fall of 2019, Shakes left school to become a full time content creator.

Shakes' TikTok content includes dance videos, comedy, a viral air freshener challenge, and joint videos with his sister, Zayla Shakes. Shakes has also used his TikTok to help promote music artists, including Lil Gnar, NLE Choppa, and Dracovii. In February 2020, he participated in a panel at Orlando's Playlist Live convention.

Due to a lack of monetization on TikTok, Shakes initially earned income from brand deals and partnerships. In 2020, he started ShakeyFam, an online store selling Shakes-branded t-shirts, hoodies, and a line of wireless earbuds known as ShakeyPods.

As of September 2021, Shakes had relocated to Miami. In 2023, Shakes partnered with Nintendo in Tokyo representing the United States to help promote the release of the video game Everybody 1-2-Switch!. In late 2023 Shakes got diagnosed with a rare form of chronic hives called Cholinergic Urticaria.
