= Lake Wales, Florida =

City in the United States

- City
- City of Lake Wales
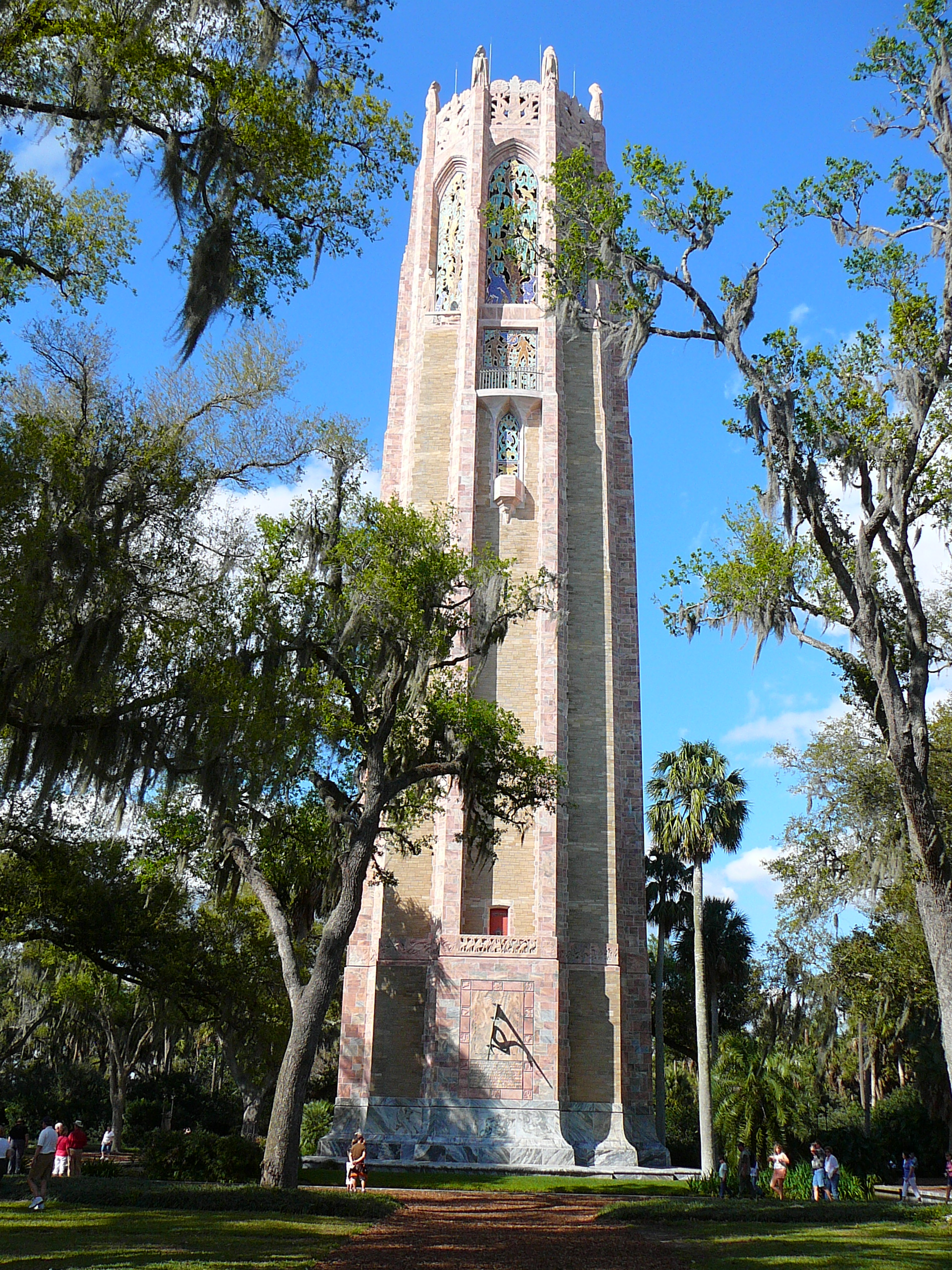

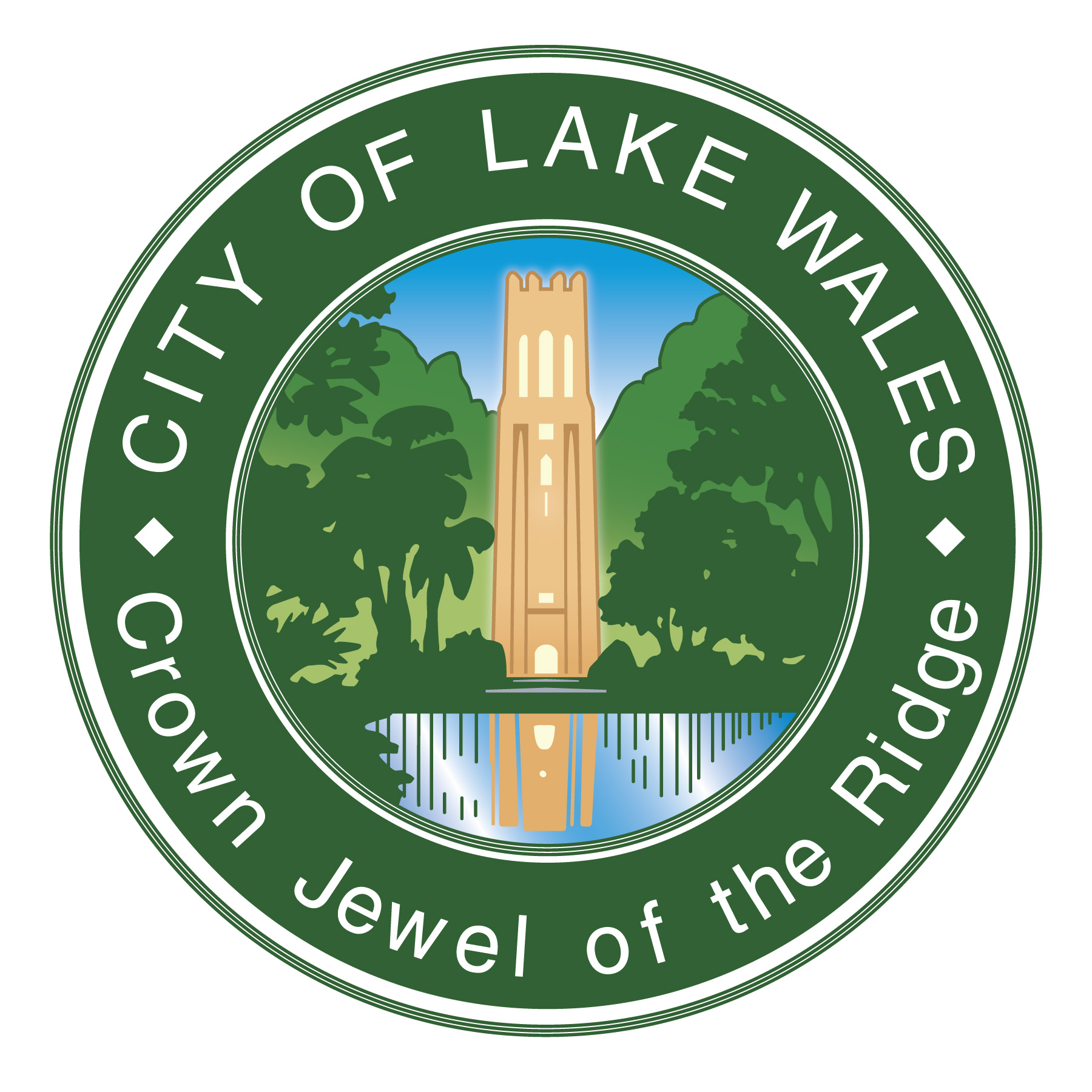
- Flag Seal
- Nickname: Crown Jewel of the Ridge
- Location in Polk County and the state of Florida
- Coordinates: 27°55′10″N 81°35′46″W
- Country: United States
- State: Florida
- County: Polk
- Settled: 1911
- Incorporated (town): May 28, 1917
- Incorporated (city): 1925

Government
  - Type: Commission-Manager

Area
  - Total: 20.12 sq mi (52.10 km^{2})
  - Land: 18.85 sq mi (48.81 km^{2})
  - Water: 1.27 sq mi (3.30 km^{2})
- Elevation: 128 ft (39 m)

Population (2020)
  - Total: 16,361
  - Density: 868.2/sq mi (335.22/km^{2})
- Demonym: Lake Walean
- Time zone: UTC-5 (Eastern (EST))
  - Summer (DST): UTC-4 (EDT)
- ZIP codes: 33800-33898
- Area code: 863
- FIPS code: 12-38950
- GNIS feature ID: 2404869
- Website: www.lakewalesfl.gov

Lake Wales is a city in Polk County, Florida, United States. It is part of the Lakeland-Winter Haven, Florida Metropolitan Statistical Area. The population was 16,361 at the 2020 census.

== History ==
=== Early history ===
A survey by W. A. Williams and J. Jackson, deputy surveyors of the State of Florida was made of the region around present-day Lake Wales. The area was considered to be uninhabitable by early settlers. By 1879, the land around the present city was surveyed again by Sidney Irving Wailes, an agent for the Florida Land and Improvement Co., who changed the name of a lake, then known as Watts Lake, to Lake Wailes.

In 1902, G. V. Tillman scouted the region of Lake Wales and saw the potential for turpentine, citrus, and other industries. He developed the idea to settle the area around Lake Wailes.

=== Settlement ===
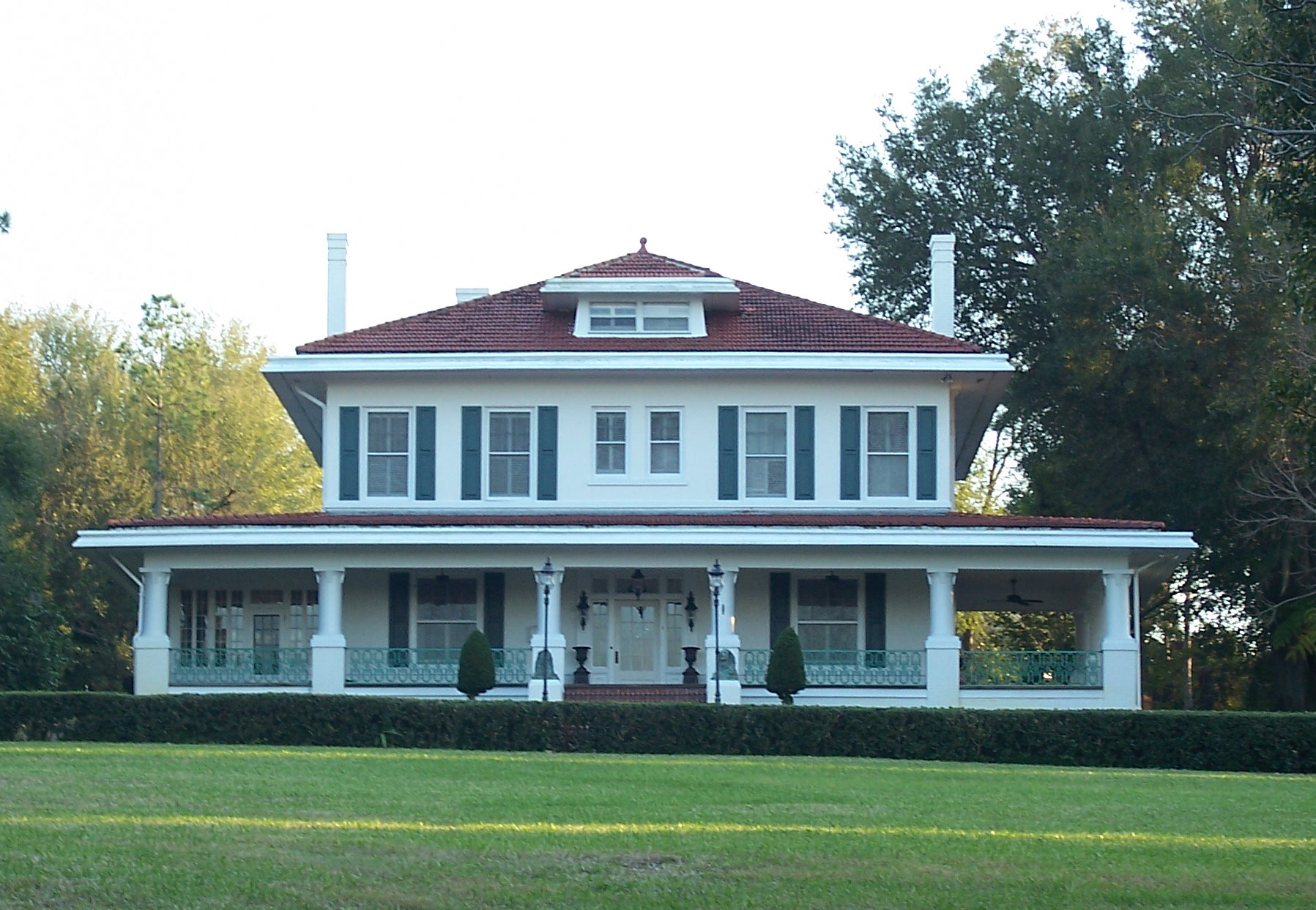
The B. K. Bullard House

The city of Lake Wales was established near the lake in 1911–1912, planned by the Lake Wales Land Company. The spelling Wales was used for the city, although the lake is still generally spelled Lake Wailes. Allen Carleton Nydegger, a civil engineer, was contracted by the Lake Wales Land Company to plot out the community of Lake Wales. He and his crew camped on the shores of Crystal Lake and spent months plotting out the new community.

"It was a foggy morning and having been a rainy fall, the water was up to both sides of the R.R. in many places causing us to almost regret having come to Florida. But just before coming to Lake Wales, the sun came out in all its glory and banished our idea of being in a swamp; we expected snakes and alligators to be running around like chickens and of course found that a great mistake... The train stopped at the platform north of the little station (used to load and unload barrels of turpentine from the still) where they unloaded our trunks before we could get off... There were no sidewalks, no lights or hard roads just deep sand everywhere with hogs and cattle roaming all over, but when I stepped from the car door and saw how beautiful the view was over the two lakes, this big moss draped pine and oak and a church under construction, I was content..." - Excerpt from "Rose Wetmore's Diary", Autumn 1912.

The City of Lake Wales was officially incorporated as a town in May 1917.

=== Florida Land Boom ===
In 1925, the Atlantic Coast Line Railroad built a new line from Haines City joining lines to Everglades City. A depot was opened on this line at Lake Wales in 1928.

=== 21st century ===
In 2004, Lake Wales endured the effects of three hurricanes which came through the area: Hurricane Charley, Hurricane Frances and Hurricane Jeanne. The three hurricanes brought hurricane-force winds to the Lake Wales area within a space of 44 days. In 2017, Hurricane Irma brought more hurricane-force winds to Lake Wales.

== Geography ==
The town lies near the geographical center of the Florida peninsula. Lake Wales is located on the Lake Wales Ridge, a sandy upland area running roughly parallel to both coasts in the center of the peninsula. According to the United States Census Bureau, the city has a total area of 14.0 square miles (36 km^{2}), of which 13.4 square miles (35 km^{2}) is land and 0.7 square miles (1.8 km^{2}) (4.71%) is water.

Lake Wales is located in Central Florida, west of Lake Kissimmee and east of Tampa.

=== Climate ===
According to the Köppen climate classification, Lake Wales has a humid subtropical climate, bordering on a tropical monsoon and dry-winter tropical savanna climate because of its hot days and warm nights, even in "winter". January is the only month of the year that has an average daily mean temperature below 18.0 °C (64.4 °F). The town is in hardiness zone 9b. In 2004, the eyes of Hurricane Charley, Hurricane Frances, and Hurricane Jeanne all passed near the town. Virtually all physical damage has been restored.

Climate data for Lake Wales, Florida (Mountain Lake), 1991–2020 normals, extremes 1935–present
Month	Jan	Feb	Mar	Apr	May	Jun	Jul	Aug	Sep	Oct	Nov	Dec	Year
Record high °F (°C)	89 (32)	91 (33)	96 (36)	98 (37)	102 (39)	102 (39)	105 (41)	100 (38)	100 (38)	96 (36)	92 (33)	89 (32)	105 (41)
Mean maximum °F (°C)	82.9 (28.3)	85.0 (29.4)	88.3 (31.3)	91.6 (33.1)	95.2 (35.1)	96.9 (36.1)	96.6 (35.9)	96.1 (35.6)	94.4 (34.7)	90.9 (32.7)	86.5 (30.3)	83.1 (28.4)	97.6 (36.4)
Mean daily maximum °F (°C)	74.7 (23.7)	77.9 (25.5)	81.6 (27.6)	86.1 (30.1)	90.4 (32.4)	92.4 (33.6)	93.2 (34.0)	93.2 (34.0)	91.1 (32.8)	86.2 (30.1)	80.1 (26.7)	76.0 (24.4)	85.2 (29.6)
Daily mean °F (°C)	62.4 (16.9)	65.4 (18.6)	68.8 (20.4)	73.5 (23.1)	78.4 (25.8)	81.8 (27.7)	82.9 (28.3)	83.1 (28.4)	81.4 (27.4)	75.9 (24.4)	68.9 (20.5)	64.6 (18.1)	73.9 (23.3)
Mean daily minimum °F (°C)	50.0 (10.0)	52.8 (11.6)	55.9 (13.3)	60.8 (16.0)	66.4 (19.1)	71.1 (21.7)	72.5 (22.5)	73.0 (22.8)	71.6 (22.0)	65.7 (18.7)	57.7 (14.3)	53.1 (11.7)	62.6 (17.0)
Mean minimum °F (°C)	30.9 (−0.6)	33.8 (1.0)	38.0 (3.3)	46.0 (7.8)	55.8 (13.2)	66.1 (18.9)	68.8 (20.4)	69.6 (20.9)	66.1 (18.9)	52.0 (11.1)	41.6 (5.3)	33.6 (0.9)	28.6 (−1.9)
Record low °F (°C)	16 (−9)	24 (−4)	25 (−4)	33 (1)	44 (7)	50 (10)	58 (14)	60 (16)	55 (13)	36 (2)	24 (−4)	16 (−9)	16 (−9)
Average precipitation inches (mm)	2.64 (67)	2.19 (56)	2.76 (70)	2.42 (61)	3.56 (90)	8.92 (227)	7.81 (198)	8.06 (205)	6.89 (175)	3.25 (83)	1.82 (46)	2.45 (62)	52.77 (1,340)
Average precipitation days (≥ 0.01 in)	5.9	5.5	5.6	5.3	6.8	13.6	13.8	14.3	11.3	6.9	4.3	5.3	98.6
Source: NOAA

=== Wildlife and environmental lands ===
Grassy Lake Preserve is a 185 acres (0.75 km^{2}) preserve located behind Janie Howard Wilson Elementary School. Grassy Lake is primarily made up of Lake Wales Ridge scrub land.

== Government and politics ==
=== Municipal government ===
Lake Wales is governed by a five-person city commission under the Commission-Manager form of government. The day-to-day operations of the city are run by a professional city manager who is appointed by the elected city commission.

==== Elected officials and elections ====
===== City Commission =====
There are five commission members, of which four are city commissioners and one mayor. The legislative power of the city is vested in the city commission and it determines policies to be implemented by the City Manager.

The city commission is responsible for adopting ordinances, adopting an annual budget, developing an overall vision for the city, zoning changes, comprehensive plan amendments, certain types of development, redevelopment, franchises for provision of public services, bid awards, water and sewer rate changes, and changes in tax rate. The commission is also responsible for appointing the City Manager, the City Clerk, and the City Attorney.

Lake Wales City Commission
Seat	Office Holder	In Office Since
1 / At-Large	Jack Hilligoss	2022
2	Daniel Williams	2021
3	Keith Thompson	2023
4	Carol Gillespie	2024
5	Terri Miller	2026

===== Mayor =====
The mayor is presiding officer of the city commission and has a voice and a vote in its proceedings but no veto power. The current mayor is Jack Hilligoss, who took office in May 2022.

===== Elections and terms of office =====
Lake Wales municipal elections are nonpartisan.

Each member of the commission is elected to serve a 3-year term. The five commission members are elected at large, of which four commission members must reside and be nominated in the district represented by the seat to which they are elected. The mayor can reside in any district of the city.

The commission shall elect from among its members a deputy mayor who shall act as mayor during the absence or disability of the mayor, and if a vacancy occurs, shall become mayor for the remainder of the unexpired term.

=== Law enforcement ===
The city was first incorporated, and the Police Department was established in 1917. Within the first 28 months there were seven different chiefs. The first chief was W.P. Page, who served from July 1917 to October 1917. In 1917, the first jail was built on the northwest corner of Seminole Avenue and the railroad tracks. It was a 12x20 foot wooden structure with walls that were six inches thick. It had bars on the windows, and part of the compound was fenced in to hold stray animals. It was the jail until the new one was built in 1928. That is when the police station, city hall and the fire department all merged into one building.

Two K9s have died from injuries sustained in the line of duty. K9 Zeke tracked into fouled water and passed away from an infection within three days on November 28, 2008. K9 Max was shot and killed August 3, 2022.

== Demographics ==
Historical population
Census	Pop.	Note	%±
1920	796		—
1930	3,401		327.3%
1940	5,024		47.7%
1950	6,821		35.8%
1960	8,346		22.4%
1970	8,240		−1.3%
1980	8,466		2.7%
1990	9,670		14.2%
2000	10,194		5.4%
2010	14,225		39.5%
2020	16,361		15.0%
U.S. Decennial Census

=== Racial and ethnic composition ===
Lake Wales racial composition (Hispanics excluded from racial categories) (NH = Non-Hispanic)
Race	Pop 2010	Pop 2020	% 2010	% 2020
White (NH)	7,820	7,750	54.97%	47.37%
Black or African American (NH)	3,784	3,918	26.60%	23.95%
Native American or Alaska Native (NH)	46	32	0.32%	0.20%
Asian (NH)	117	167	0.82%	1.02%
Pacific Islander or Native Hawaiian (NH)	3	5	0.02%	0.03%
Some other race (NH)	29	56	0.20%	0.34%
Two or more races/Multiracial (NH)	204	517	1.43%	3.16%
Hispanic or Latino (any race)	2,222	3,916	15.62%	23.93%
Total	14,225	16,361		

=== 2020 census ===
As of the 2020 census, Lake Wales had a population of 16,361. The median age was 43.0 years. 22.2% of residents were under the age of 18 and 26.3% of residents were 65 years of age or older. For every 100 females there were 89.2 males, and for every 100 females age 18 and over there were 84.3 males age 18 and over.

95.7% of residents lived in urban areas, while 4.3% lived in rural areas.

There were 6,633 households in Lake Wales, of which 29.3% had children under the age of 18 living in them. Of all households, 43.6% were married-couple households, 16.6% were households with a male householder and no spouse or partner present, and 32.3% were households with a female householder and no spouse or partner present. About 28.0% of all households were made up of individuals and 14.7% had someone living alone who was 65 years of age or older. According to the Census Bureau's 2020 ACS 5-year estimates, there were 4,015 families residing in the city.

There were 7,559 housing units, of which 12.3% were vacant. The homeowner vacancy rate was 2.2% and the rental vacancy rate was 9.0%.

=== 2010 census ===
As of the 2010 United States census, there were 14,225 people, 5,710 households, and 3,712 families residing in the city.

== Local attractions ==
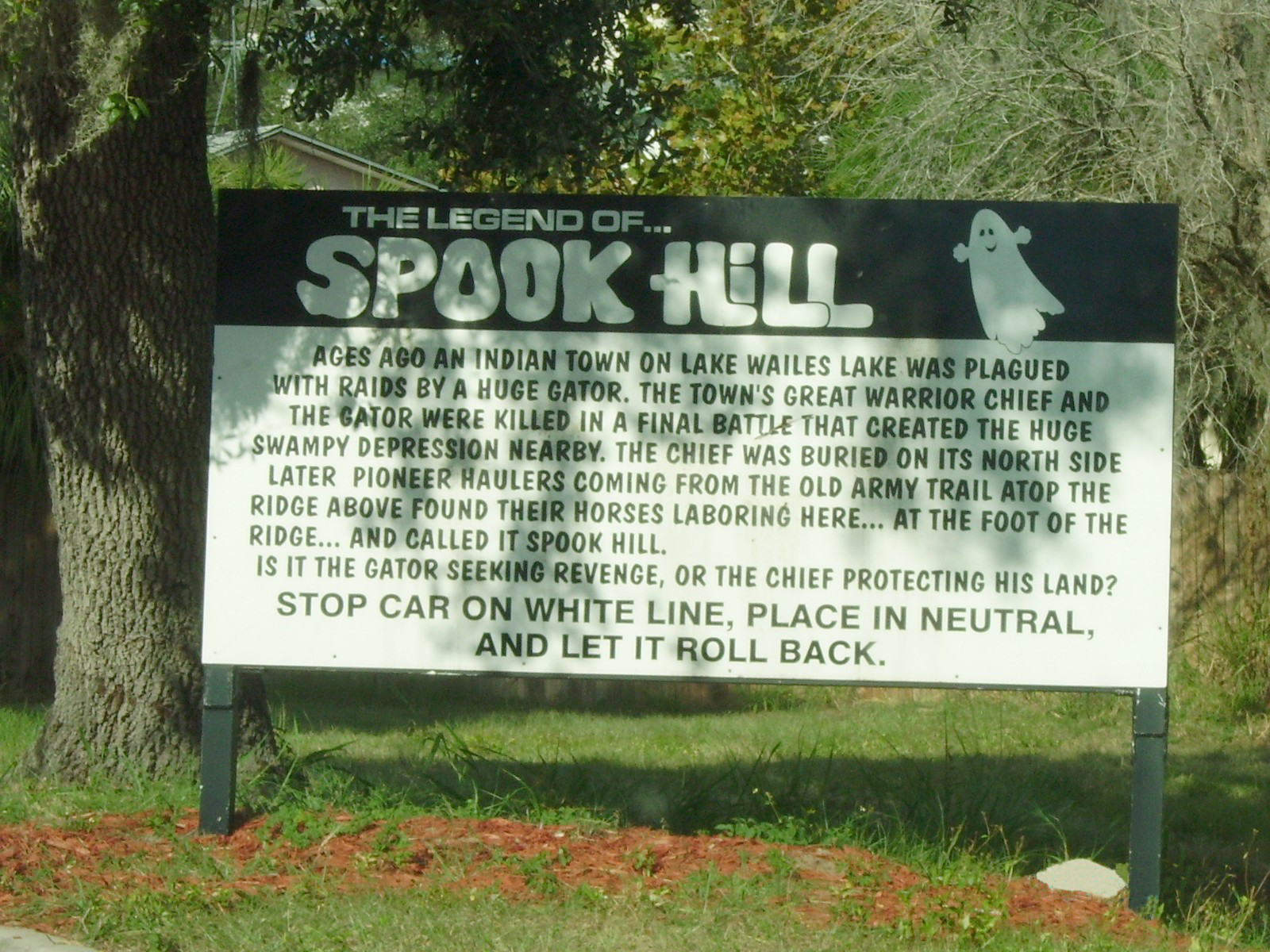
The sign at Spook Hill

- Bok Tower Gardens
- Camp Mack's River Resort
- Dixie Walesbilt Hotel (also known as the Hotel Walesbilt)
- Spook Hill, an optical illusion which makes a car in neutral appear as if it is traveling uphill (gravity hill)
- The commercial historic district in the heart of the old town contains important examples of architecture from the period of the Florida land boom of the 1920s. The district's tallest building, the Walesbilt Hotel, has been boarded up for many years but has been purchased and is in the process of being restored.
- The Lake Wales History Museum is a history museum funded by a public-private partnership. It is housed in the old Atlantic Coast Line Railroad Depot (Lake Wales, Florida). It offers exhibits and artifacts from the pre-Columbian era to modern.
- Grove House, the visitor center for the agricultural cooperative Florida's Natural (located across from the company's processing plant).
- Chalet Suzanne
- The Shrine of Ste Anne des Lacs

== Notable people ==
- Edward Bok, editor at Ladies' Home Journal, died in Lake Wales in 1930
- Walter Clayton Jr., NBA player who grew up in Lake Wales and attended Lake Wales High school for his first two years of high school
- Pat Borders, 1992 World Series MVP, part-time Lake Wales resident
- Wade Davis, MLB pitcher for the Colorado Rockies and the Kansas City Royals; born in Lake Wales
- Walt Faulkner, racecar driver, lived in Lake Wales from 1926 to 1936
- Mario Gosselin, NASCAR driver/owner, lives in the NASCAR Xfinity Series in Lake Wales
- Red "Galloping Ghost" Grange, player in the College Football Hall of Fame and the NFL
- Dominique Jones, NBA player, born and attended high school in Lake Wales
- Ryan Shakes, American social media personality
- Josephine Sprott (1867–1952), President, Woman's Christian Temperance Union of South Carolina
- Amar'e Stoudemire, NBA player, born in Lake Wales
- Robbie Tobeck, center for NFL's Seattle Seahawks; born in Lake Wales
- Baxter Troutman, Florida House of Representatives member

== Transportation ==
- US 27 – This divided highway leads northward to Haines City and Interstate 4 going north, and Frostproof, Sebring, and eventually Miami going south.
- SR 60 – Also known as Hesperides Road, it leads eastward to Florida's Turnpike and Vero Beach. Westward the highway leads to Bartow and the Tampa Bay region.
- SR 17 – The Scenic Highway running through the center of town, paralleling US 27 southward to Frostproof and northward to Haines City

Bus service is provided to Winter Haven and Frostproof by Winter Haven Area Transit.

Lake Wales Municipal Airport (FAA LID: X07) is a public-use airport located 2 miles (3.2 km) west of the central business district of the city of Lake Wales in Polk County, Florida, United States. The airport is publicly owned.

Chalet Suzanne Air Strip This single grass strip four miles north of downtown serves light aircraft arriving at the Chalet Suzanne Inn and Restaurant, a local landmark.

== Media ==
Lake Wales is part of the Tampa/St. Pete television market, the 13th largest in the country and part of the local Lakeland/Winter Haven radio market, which is the 94th largest in the country.

== Education ==
Lake Wales is home to twelve schools, six of which are charter, three of which are traditional public schools and three private schools. Dale R Fair Babson Park Elementary, Hillcrest Elementary, Janie Howard Wilson Elementary, Polk Avenue Elementary and Lake Wales High School were converted to charter status in the Fall of 2004. Edward W. Bok Academy Middle opened in the Fall of 2008 to create a seamless K–12 charter system. McLaughlin Middle School and Fine Arts Academy, Roosevelt Academy Of Leadership And Applied Technology School, and Spook Hill Elementary School are still traditional public schools. Lake Wales Lutheran School, Candlelight Christian Academy, and The Vanguard School are private.

Lake Wales is also home to two colleges, Warner University and Webber International University. The J.D. Alexander Center, a satellite campus of Polk State College is located in downtown Lake Wales in 2009.

== Healthcare ==
The only hospital in Lake Wales is AdventHealth Lake Wales.
