= Bartow High School =

Bartow Senior High School
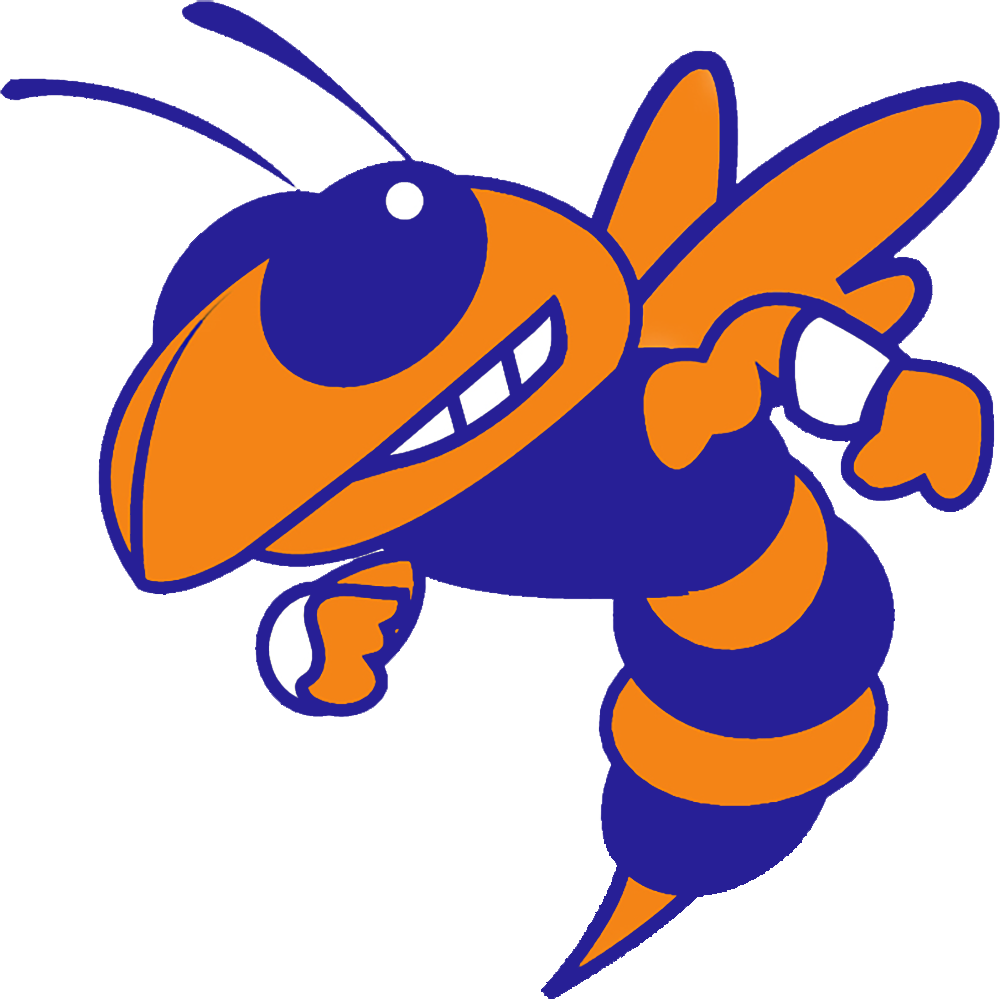

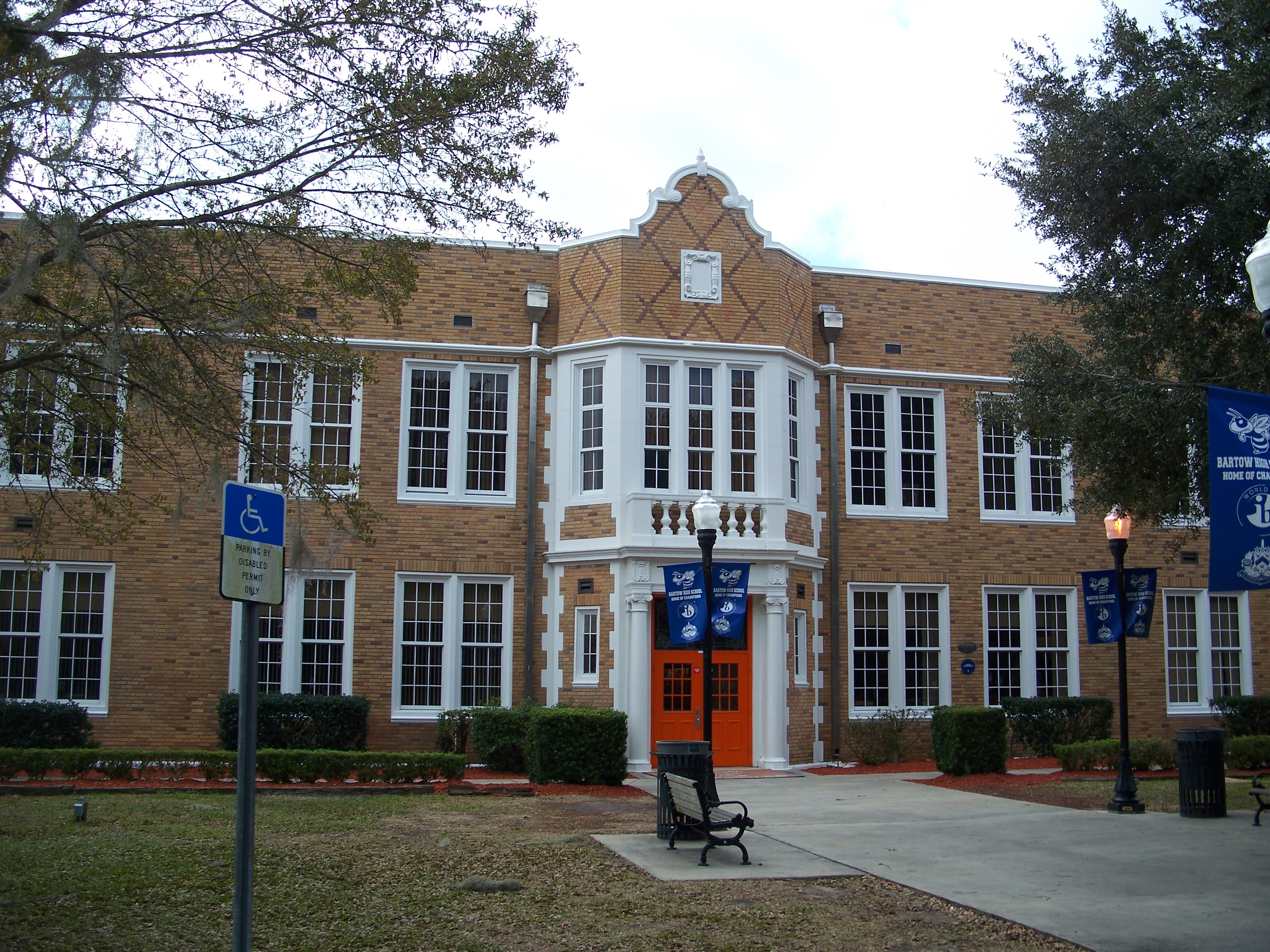

Location
- 1270 South Broadway Avenue; Bartow, Polk County, Florida 33830; United States; 27.883214°N 81.84307°W

Information
- School type: High school
- Established: 1887
- Status: Open
- School district: Polk County Public Schools
- Principal: Lance Lawson
- Teaching staff: 103.00 (on an FTE basis)
- Grades: 9–12
- Gender: Co-ed
- Enrollment: 2,243 (2023–2024)
- Student to teacher ratio: 21.78
- Language: English
- Colors: Blue; Orange; White
- Nickname: Yellow Jackets
- Rival: Kathleen High School
- Yearbook: Echo
- Feeder schools: Bartow Middle School, Union Academy
- Website: https://bartowhigh.polkschoolsfl.com/

Bartow Senior High School is the only high school in Bartow, Florida, United States. It resulted from a merger of the whites-only Summerlin Institute and Union Academy, a school for African Americans, after desegregation.

== History ==
Summerlin Institute was founded in 1887 as the first public high school in Bartow. It was named after Jacob Summerlin, who donated large amounts of land to the cities of Bartow and Orlando. This school was the first brick school in the United States located south of Jacksonville. It was also the only public military school in Florida.

Union Academy dates to 1897, when it opened as an elementary school for African Americans. In 1923, a secondary school curriculum was added, and Union Academy became a high school for African-Americans.

Summerlin Institute was relocated to the corner of Broadway Avenue and Tharp Street, the current location of Bartow High School, in 1927.

In 1968, Polk County schools were integrated and all high school students were assigned to the same school regardless of race. Summerlin Institute was renamed Bartow Senior High School, while Union Academy became an integrated middle school. The name change was controversial because Summerlin Institute was considered one of the more prestigious public schools in the Southern United States, but because the school was named after Jacob Summerlin, who was a slaveholder, many felt the name change was appropriate.

In 1996, Bartow High School earned approval from the IBO to offer the International Baccalaureate Diploma program. Students pursuing this program are placed in the International Baccalaureate School, a school-within-a-school on the Bartow High campus. While IB students attend many IB-specific classes, they take regular Bartow High School electives, and participate in the Bartow High School athletic program. Beginning with the Class of 2010, it was only composed of students from western Polk County, due to the opening of a second IB school at Haines City High School for students from eastern Polk County. There is no longer a principal for IB Bartow, but the current head of schools is Mandy Craven.

In 2006, the Summerlin Academy was established as a military school originally located under the same roof as Bartow High School and International Baccalaureate School. In 2008, Summerlin moved to its own facility in Bartow.

=== Athletics ===
The school's teams are known as the Yellow Jackets, although the school colors and uniforms are blue and orange (a result of the merge between Summerlin Institute and Union Academy; Summerlin's colors were orange and white, and Union's colors were blue and white).

Over the last forty years, the school has won team and individual state championships in football, boys' basketball, swimming, boys' weightlifting and girls' softball.

The girls' softball team is the only school to have appeared in a FHSAA state championship game for ten consecutive years (1997–2006), winning seven of those matches. Two Bartow pitchers became the first and second players in FHSAA softball history to pitch in four state championship games. Melissa Parsons pitched from 1997 to 2000, winning the 1997 and 2000 titles. Lindsay Littlejohn won four state title games from 2002 to 2005. Bartow also became the first team to win five consecutive state softball championships (2002–2006). In 2003, the program earned a No. 1 national ranking by the USA Today Coaches' Poll.

== Notable alumni ==
=== Bartow High School ===
- Tony Bradley (born 1998), basketball player (Utah Jazz)
- Walter Clayton Jr. (born 2003), basketball player for the Florida Gators, and for the Utah Jazz & Memphis Grizzlies of the NBA; named Most Outstanding Player of the 2025 Final Four
- Bob Crawford, former legislator in the Florida Senate
- Marcus Floyd (born 1978), pastor, former NFL player for New York Jets, Buffalo Bills and Carolina Panthers; #24 jersey retired on October 4, 2013
- Odell Haggins, longtime FSU assistant football coach, interim head coach, 2017
- Ryan Harbin (born 2001), professional baseball player
- Katherine Harris (born 1957), former Florida secretary of state and former member of the United States House of Representatives
- Jack Latvala, former member of Florida Senate
- John Laurent, state senator
- Jason Odom (born 1974), former professional football player
- Adam Putnam (born 1974), Florida commissioner of agriculture and former member of the United States House of Representatives

=== Summerlin Institute ===
- Charles O. Andrews, U.S. senator 1938–1946
- Frank Clark, former Bartow City attorney, U.S. representative for the 2nd District 1905–1925
- Spessard Holland (1892–1971), 28th Florida governor and U.S. senator; founding partner of law firm Holland & Knight
- J. Adrian Jackson, rear admiral, U.S. Navy
- James Van Fleet (1892–1992), head of U.S. forces in the Korean War
- Marvin Pipkin (1899-1977), chemist for the United States Army and General Electric, inventor of the frosted soft white lightbulb

=== Union Academy ===
- Jim Battle, American football player for the Minnesota Vikings of the NFL & the Edmonton Eskimos (now the Edmonton Elks) of the CFL
- Major Hazelton, American NFL football player
- Nat James, American NFL football player
- Alton Lavan, American football player
- Ken Riley, American football Pro Football Hall of Fame cornerback for the Cincinnati Bengals
- Sam Silas, American football player for the St. Louis Cardinals, New York Giants, and San Francisco 49ers
- Jerry Simmons, American football player for the Pittsburgh Steelers, Chicago Bears, and several other NFL teams
