= List of Florida A&M Rattlers in the NFL draft =

This is a list of Florida A&M Rattlers in the NFL Draft. In total Florida A&M has had 66 players drafted since 1953.

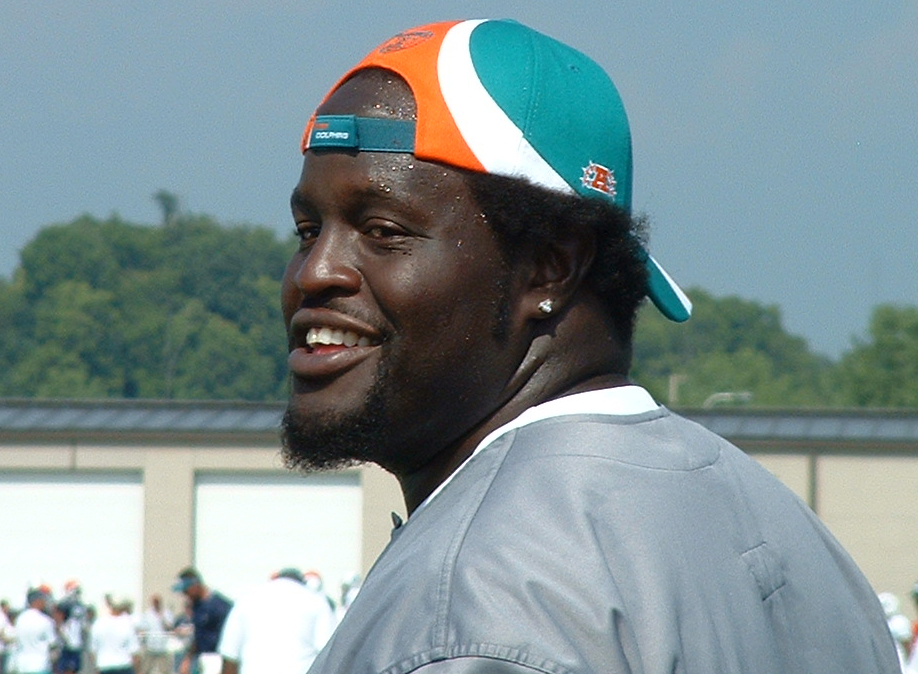
Jamie Nails was drafted in the 1997 NFL draft.

== Key ==
B	Back	K	Kicker	NT	Nose tackle
C	Center	LB	Linebacker	FB	Fullback
DB	Defensive back	P	Punter	HB	Halfback
DE	Defensive end	QB	Quarterback	WR	Wide receiver
DT	Defensive tackle	RB	Running back	G	Guard
E	End	T	Offensive tackle	TE	Tight end

== Selections ==
Year	Round	Pick	Overall	Name	Team	Position
1953	10	4	113	Jimmy Moore	Chicago Bears	B
1953	15	9	178	Willie Irvin	Philadelphia Eagles	E
1954	7	2	75	Sam Marshall	Green Bay Packers	T
1954	23	5	270	Herm Lee	Chicago Bears	T
1956	5	9	58	Willie Galimore	Chicago Bears	B
1957	20	11	240	Al Frazier	Chicago Bears	B
1958	27	7	320	Alonzo Vereen	Los Angeles Rams	B
1959	6	1	61	Willie Taylor	Green Bay Packers	C
1959	25	1	289	Leroy Hardee	Green Bay Packers	B
1961	7	12	96	Lewis Johnson	Green Bay Packers	B
1961	14	11	193	Eugene White	New York Giants	B
1961	16	8	218	Jake Bradley	St. Louis Cardinals	T
1962	5	3	59	Curtis Miranda	New York Giants	C
1962	8	14	112	Jim Tullis	Green Bay Packers	B
1962	17	5	229	Nat Tucker	Pittsburgh Steelers	B
1963	6	3	73	Bob Paremore	St. Louis Cardinals	B
1963	11	10	150	James Tullis	Chicago Bears	DB
1963	11	11	151	Hewritt Dixon	Pittsburgh Steelers	B
1964	6	2	72	Al Denson	Philadelphia Eagles	E
1964	7	4	88	Bob Hayes	Dallas Cowboys	WR
1964	16	5	215	Carleton Oats	Minnesota Vikings	DE
1965	6	1	71	Bobby Felts	Baltimore Colts	RB
1965	13	4	172	Dave Daniels	Chicago Bears	T
1966	7	5	100	Arthur Robinson	Dallas Cowboys	WR
1966	19	6	281	Andre White	Washington Redskins	WR
1966	20	5	295	John Kelly	Washington Redskins	C
1967	15	6	373	Don Smith	Denver Broncos	G
1968	3	2	57	Major Hazelton	Chicago Bears	DB
1968	6	14	152	Nathaniel James	Cleveland Browns	DB
1968	8	23	215	Joe Williams	Los Angeles Rams	WR
1968	9	25	244	John Eason	Oakland Raiders	TE
1969	6	5	135	Ken Riley	Cincinnati Bengals	DB
1969	14	26	364	Roger Finnie	New York Jets	DE
1970	9	3	211	Hubie Ginn	Miami Dolphins	RB
1970	13	22	334	Melvin Jones	Los Angeles Rams	WR
1970	15	4	368	Kent Schoolfield	Boston Patriots	WR
1971	14	1	339	Alfred Sykes	New England Patriots	WR
1971	17	22	438	Leroy Charlton	San Francisco 49ers	DB
1972	9	24	232	Charlie Goodrum	Minnesota Vikings	G
1974	1	19	19	Henry Lawrence	Oakland Raiders	T
1975	12	7	293	James Rackley	Kansas City Chiefs	RB
1976	14	23	398	Greg Coleman	Cincinnati Bengals	P
1976	16	21	452	Claude Johnson	Houston Oilers	LB
1977	9	5	228	Ken Mullens	New York Giants	DE
1978	8	7	201	Jeff Grady	New York Giants	LB
1980	12	10	315	Thomas Lane	Minnesota Vikings	DB
1980	12	13	318	Kiser Lewis	New Orleans Saints	LB
1980	12	28	333	Tyrone McGriff	Pittsburgh Steelers	G
1986	9	5	226	Merlon Jones	New Orleans Saints	LB
1987	7	11	179	Gene Atkins	New Orleans Saints	DB
1989	8	10	205	Derrick Gainer	Los Angeles Raiders	RB
1991	7	25	192	Terry Beauford	San Diego Chargers	G
1991	7	27	194	Amir Rasul	Buffalo Bills	RB
1991	12	16	322	Antoine Bennett	Cincinnati Bengals	DB
1992	11	22	302	Tim Daniel	Dallas Cowboys	WR
1994	3	13	78	Ervin Collier	New England Patriots	DT
1994	5	15	146	Terry Mickens	Green Bay Packers	WR
1994	6	2	163	Dexter Nottage	Washington Redskins	DE
1995	4	23	121	Jamie Brown	Denver Broncos	T
1996	4	31	126	Earl Holmes	Pittsburgh Steelers	LB
1997	4	24	120	Jamie Nails	Buffalo Bills	T
1998	5	3	126	Cedric Harden	San Diego Chargers	DE
1998	7	20	209	George Cousins	Arizona Cardinals	DE
2000	6	39	205	Ja'Juan Seider	San Diego Chargers	QB
2011	7	47	250	Curtis Holcomb	San Francisco 49ers	DB
2013	7	39	245	Brandon Hepburn	Detroit Lions	LB
