= List of schools in Bartow, Florida =

Public primary and secondary education in Bartow, Florida is operated by the Polk County School Board. Polk County Schools operates 3 high schools, 2 middle schools and elementary schools within Bartow.

High schools

- Bartow High School (formerly Summerlin Institute)
- International Baccalaureate World School
- Summerlin Academy

Middle schools

- Bartow Middle School
- Union Academy Magnet Middle School

Elementary schools

- James E. Stephens Elementary School
- Gibbons Street Elementary School
- Floral Avenue Elementary School
- Bartow Elementary Academy
- Spessard L. Holland Elementary

Other Schools

- Gause Academy
- Polk Life and Learning Center

Private Schools

- First Methodist School
- Word of Life Christian School
