= Claude Woodruff =

U.S. Marine, college football player and coach

Claude E. Woodruff (died June 15, 2009) was a U.S. marine, college football player and head coach, as well as an assistant football and assistant track coach at various high schools in Central Florida including Union Academy in Bartow, Florida. Programs he coached in produced many players who went on to college football stardom, often at Florida A&M University (FAMU). Several became NFL players. As a player, he was on the 1950 FAMU team that won the Black College National Title. As a coach his teams won five track and field state titles. He is a member of the FAMU and Central Florida Sports Hall of Fame.

== Early life ==
Woodruff dropped out of school and served as a United States Marine in Japan. He returned to Union Academy a war hero and became a star athlete who was recruited by the coaches at Florida A&M University. As a 175-pound lineman he helped the Rattlers win the Black College National Title in 1950 playing for Alonzo “Jake” Gaither.

He planned to enlist in the Army after graduation, but FAMU coach Gaither and Union Academy principal James E. Stephens encouraged him to become a teacher and coach.

== Career in education and coaching ==
He taught science and physical education at several high schools in the Central Florida from 1952 until 1986, including at Union Academy where teams he worked with won five state championships in track and field. Players he worked with included Cincinnati Bengal and FAMU head football coach Ken Riley. His coaching stints also included time as Osceola High School's head coach

He also worked on a ranch and opened Osceola Q in Kissimmee. He had his recipes published in Great Black-American Cooking.

Marion County rancher Tom Silas was his uncle.

On February 25, 2002, he was interviewed about his experiences and career.

== Players he coached ==
- Ken Riley, cornerback for the Cincinnati Bengals
- Nate James
- Major Hazelton, Chicago Bear after leaving FAMU
- Sam Silas, Boston Patriots player
