= Tenoroc High School =

- Tenoroc Senior High School

Location
- 4905 Saddle Creek Road; Lakeland, Florida; United States
- 28.07232°N 81.85993°W

Information
- Type: High school
- Established: 2008
- School district: Polk County Public Schools
- Administrator: Ave’ Wright-Gayner
- Principal: Ave’ Wright-Gayner
- Teaching staff: 51.00 (FTE)
- Enrollment: 1,127 (2022-23)
- Student to teacher ratio: 22.10
- Campus: 140 acres (570,000 m^{2})
- Color: Purple Gray
- Mascot: Titans
- Website: Tenoroc High School

Tenoroc High School (THS) is a public secondary school in Lakeland, Florida. The current principal is Ave’ Wright-Gayner. The School Board of Polk County established Tenoroc to relieve overcrowding problems at Lakeland High School, Lake Gibson High School, Auburndale High School, and Lake Region High School. It is also one of the more technologically advanced schools owned by the School Board of Polk County and hosts a specialized learning center known as "Power Academy." Power Academy is a 4-year training program for students intending to be employed at Lakeland Electric, Polk County's municipal utility company.

== Establishment ==
Tenoroc High School was established in mid-2008. Ernest Joe, Jr., the former principal of Auburndale High School, opened THS in the Summer of 2008; however, the official opening ceremonies were not held until later in the year. The school colors were decided by student referendum in early 2008. Students were also involved in choosing the school's mascot, the Titan. Principal Joe made popular, the phrase "the 'Roc" in referring to the actual school.

== Dedications ==
Students are encouraged to dedicate their feelings for or against the school in poetic ways, as opposed to prose.

The words and music of the alma mater are by Jim Parker, 2008.
