= Dwayne Bacon =

American basketball player (born 1995)

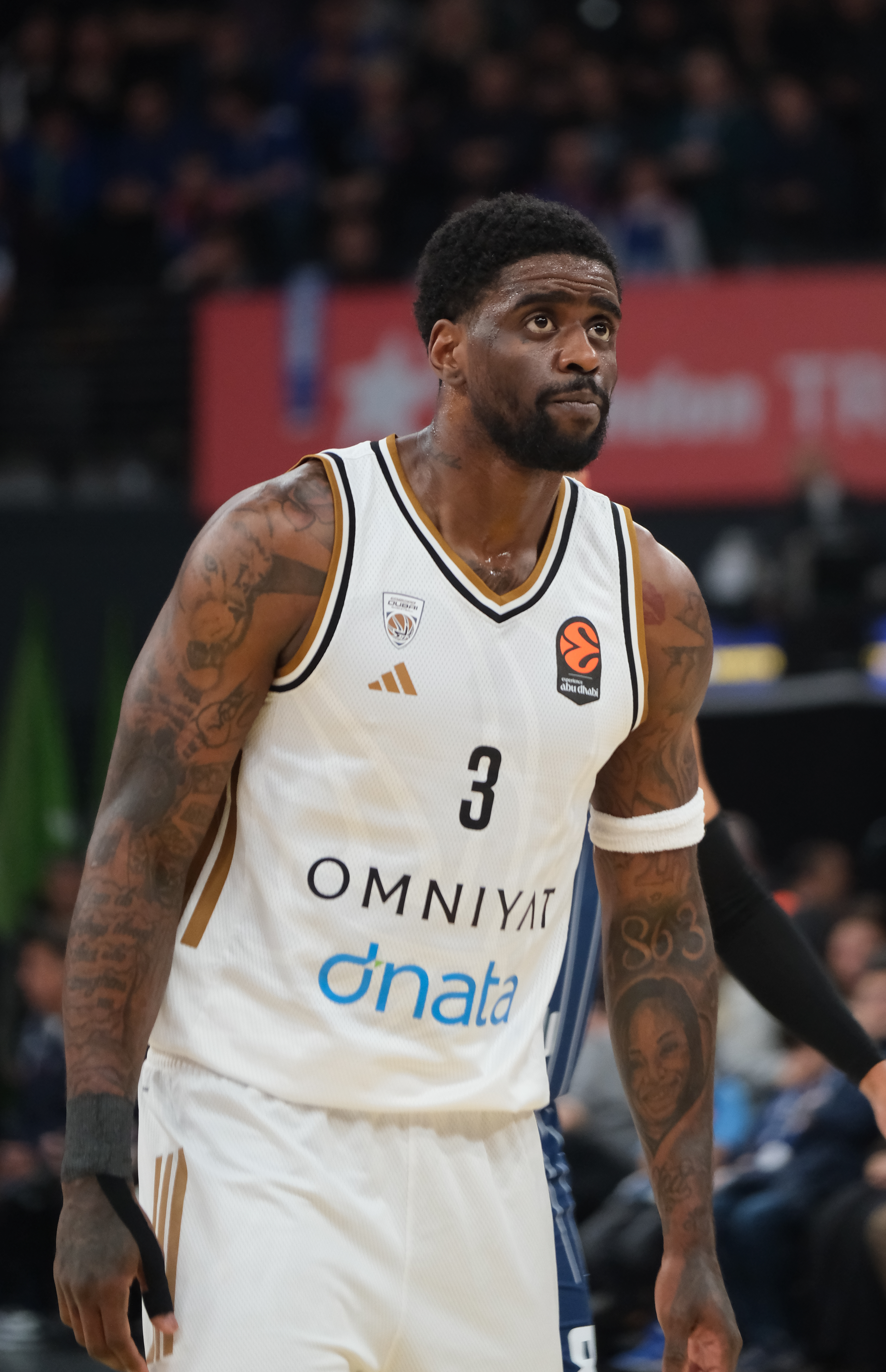
- Bacon with Dubai Basketball in 2025

No. 3 – Dubai Basketball
- Position: Small forward
- League: ABA League; EuroLeague

Personal information
- Born: August 30, 1995 (age 31) Lakeland, Florida, U.S.
- Listed height: 6 ft 6 in (1.98 m)
- Listed weight: 221 lb (100 kg)

Career information
- High school: McKeel Academy (Lakeland, Florida); IMG Academy (Bradenton, Florida); Oak Hill Academy (Mouth of Wilson, Virginia)
- College: Florida State (2015–2017)
- NBA draft: 2017: 2nd round, 40th overall pick
- Drafted by: New Orleans Pelicans
- Playing career: 2017–present

Career history
- 2017–2020: Charlotte Hornets
- 2017–2020: →Greensboro Swarm
- 2020–2021: Orlando Magic
- 2021–2022: AS Monaco
- 2022–2023: Panathinaikos
- 2023–2024: Shanghai Sharks
- 2024: Leones de Ponce
- 2024–2025: Zenit Saint Petersburg
- 2025–present: Dubai Basketball

Career highlights
- VTB United League MVP (2025); ABA League champion (2026); All-ABA League Team (2026); Greek All-Star (2022); Second-team All-ACC (2017); McDonald's All-American (2015); First-team Parade All-American (2015)
- Stats at NBA.com
- Stats at Basketball Reference

Dwayne Lee Bacon Jr. (born August 30, 1995) is an American professional basketball player for the Dubai Basketball of the ABA League and the EuroLeague. He has also played for the Charlotte Hornets and the Orlando Magic in the National Basketball Association (NBA). Bacon played college basketball for the Florida State Seminoles.

== High school career ==
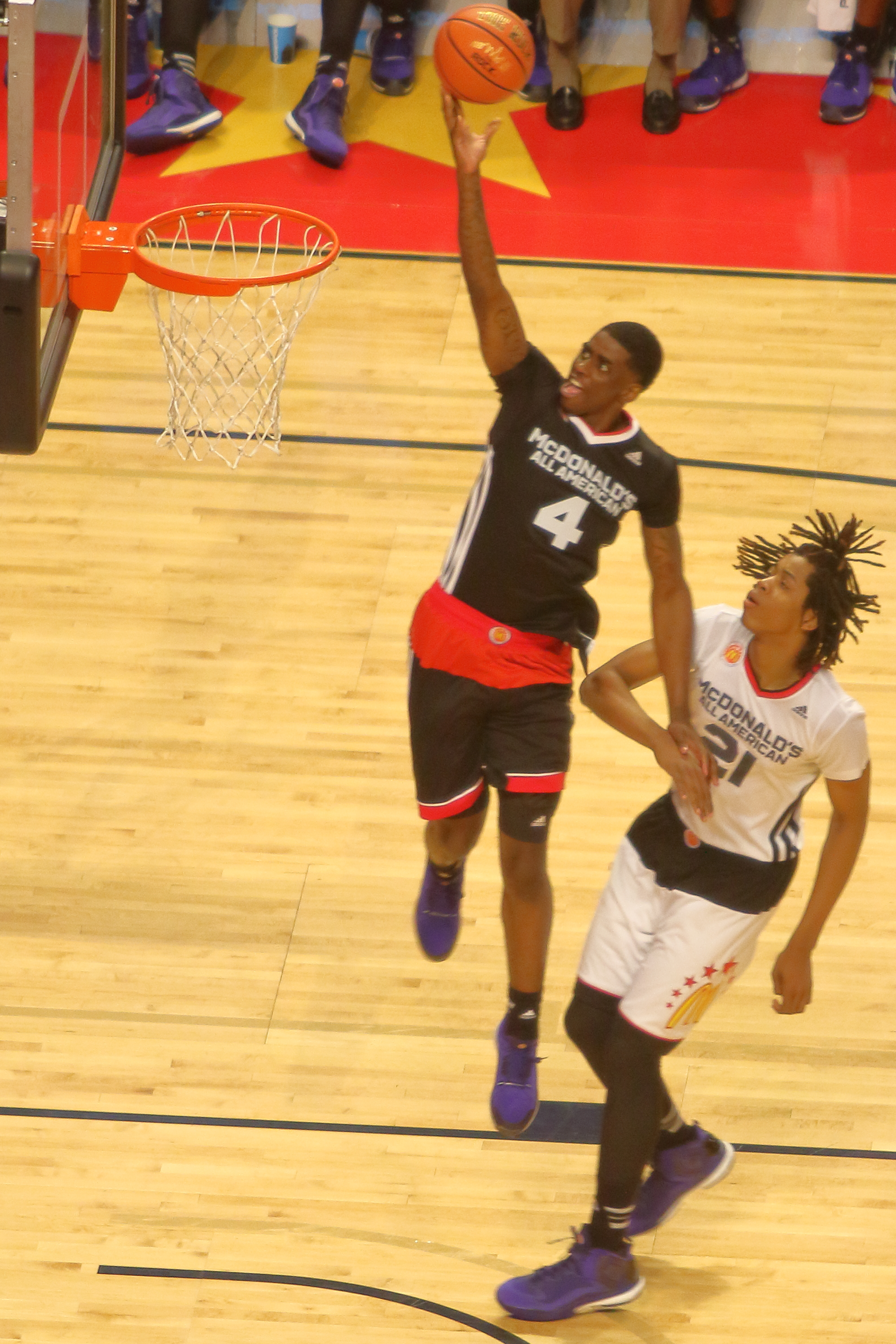
Bacon at the 2015 McDonald's All-American Game

Dwayne Bacon attended the McKeel Academy in his native Lakeland, Florida until transferring to the IMG Academy in Bradenton, Florida for his junior season. At McKeel Academy, Bacon averaged 23 points, 7 rebounds, and 3 steals as a sophomore in 2012–2013. He led McKeel to a 17–8 overall record and to the FHSAA championship tournament regional semifinals in 2013. In his junior season of 2013–2014 at IMG Academy Bacon was IMG's leading scorer. In his only season at IMG he averaged 19.3 ppg and led in assist with 4.0 apg while shooting 42% from the field and 70% from the free throw line in 12 games played. Bacon transferred to the Oak Hill Academy for his senior season. On September 5, 2014. Dwayne Bacon committed to Florida State over offers from Oklahoma State, Georgia Tech, and Auburn. In his senior year at Oak Hill, Dwayne Bacon led Oak Hill to an undefeated regular season with a record of 45–0 and averaged 24.4 points per game, 4.4 rebounds per game, 3.4 assists per game, and 2.2 steals per game. He was ranked 14th on ESPN 100. Bacon played for the Showtime Ballers AAU program based in Orlando for three seasons.

== College career ==
Bacon signed with Florida State on September 5, 2015. As a freshman at Florida State, Bacon received the National Freshman of the week honors from CBS Sports on November 21. He was a three-time ACC rookie of the week (Nov 16, Dec 21 and 28). In his first career game Bacon had 23 points, 8 rebounds, 2 steals and 1 assist. Bacon achieved his first career win over Charleston Southern with 20 points and 10 rebounds. He appeared in every game during the 2015–16 season for the Seminoles and averaged 15.8 points and 5.8 rebounds over 28.8 minutes per game. On March 23, Bacon announced via Twitter that he would test his draft status for the 2016 NBA draft. He did not hire an agent and retained his amateur status and the ability to return to Florida State for the 2016–17 season. However, on March 28 he announced he will return to college.

During his sophomore season, Bacon was named a member of the All-ACC second team for his work with Florida State that season. After his team was eliminated from the 2017 NCAA tournament, Bacon declared for the 2017 NBA draft (with a commitment that he'd sign with an agent soon afterward) on March 22, 2017.

== Professional career ==
=== Charlotte Hornets (2017–2020) ===
On June 22, 2017, Bacon was selected by the New Orleans Pelicans with the 40th overall pick in the 2017 NBA draft. He was later traded to the Charlotte Hornets on draft night. On July 6, he signed with the Hornets. Bacon made his NBA debut on October 18, recording eight points, two rebounds and two assists in a 90–102 loss to the Detroit Pistons. On November 3, he scored a season-high 18 points, alongside seven rebounds, in a 101–108 loss to the San Antonio Spurs. Bacon played in 53 games his rookie season and made six starts. He averaged 3.3 points and 2.3 rebounds per game.

On March 26, 2019, Bacon scored a season-high 24 points, alongside six rebounds and three steals, in a 125–116 overtime win over the San Antonio Spurs. During his sophomore season, Bacon only played in 43 games and made 13 starts due to a stint in the NBA G League with the Hornets' affiliate team, the Greensboro Swarm. However, his numbers improved statistically, with him averaging 7.3 points per game.

On November 2, 2019, Bacon scored a season-high 25 points, alongside six rebounds, two assists and two steals, in a 93–87 win over the Golden State Warriors. During his third season, Bacon regressed statistically, averaging only 5.7 points per game. In June 2020, he stated that instead of staying with the Hornets, he would "go elsewhere."

=== Orlando Magic (2020–2021) ===
On November 24, 2020, Bacon signed with his hometown team, the Orlando Magic. He made his Magic debut on December 23, recording three rebounds and three assists in a 113–107 win over the Miami Heat. On May 7, 2021, Bacon logged a career-high 28 points, alongside four rebounds and two assists, in a 112–122 loss to the Charlotte Hornets. During the 2020–21 season, Bacon appeared in all of the Magic's 72 games, made 50 starts, and averaged a career-high 10.9 points per game. On August 8, Bacon was waived by the Magic.

On August 19, 2021, Bacon signed with the New York Knicks. He was waived on October 14.

=== AS Monaco (2021–2022) ===
On October 26, 2021, Bacon signed with AS Monaco of the French LNB Pro A.

On September 26, 2022, Bacon signed with the Los Angeles Lakers. He was waived on October 8.

=== Panathinaikos (2022–2023) ===
On October 21, 2022, Bacon signed a two-year deal (with several opt-out clauses for the club) with Panathinaikos of the Greek Basket League and the EuroLeague.

On April 28, 2023, Bacon was prematurely released from the team in the middle of the Greek Basket League play-offs due to a series of disciplinary violations that the player had committed throughout the season.

In 27 EuroLeague games, Bacon averaged 16.6 points, 3.5 rebounds and 2 assists (with 1.3 turnovers), playing around 31 minutes per contest. Additionally, in 17 domestic league matches, he averaged 13.2 points, 3.9 rebounds and 2.3 assists, playing around 24 minutes per contest.

=== Leones de Ponce (2024) ===
On May 23, 2024, Bacon signed with the Leones de Ponce of the Baloncesto Superior Nacional.

=== Zenit Saint Petersburg (2024–2025) ===
On August 7, 2024, Bacon signed with the Zenit Saint Petersburg of the VTB United League. In the 2024-25 season, Bacon was named MVP for the month of March of the VTB United League.

=== Dubai Basketball (2025–present) ===
On July 16, 2025, Bacon signed with Dubai Basketball of the ABA League.

On June 12, 2026, Bacon was suspended for one game after making inappropriate remarks to a referee during the Game 3 loss.

== Career statistics ==
Legend
GP	Games played	GS	Games started	MPG	Minutes per game
FG%	Field goal percentage	3P%	3-point field goal percentage	FT%	Free throw percentage
RPG	Rebounds per game	APG	Assists per game	SPG	Steals per game
BPG	Blocks per game	PPG	Points per game	**Bold**	Career high
*	Led the league

=== NBA ===
==== Regular season ====
Year	Team	GP	GS	MPG	FG%	3P%	FT%	RPG	APG	SPG	BPG	PPG
2017–18	Charlotte	53	6	13.5	.375	.256	**.899**	2.3	.7	.3	.0	3.3
2018–19	Charlotte	43	13	17.7	**.475**	**.437**	.739	2.1	1.1	.3	**.1**	7.3
2019–20	Charlotte	39	11	17.6	.348	.284	.660	2.6	**1.3**	**.6**	**.1**	5.7
2020–21	Orlando	**72***	**50**	**25.7**	.402	.285	.824	**3.1**	**1.3**	**.6**	**.1**	**10.9**
Career		207	80	19.4	.402	.314	.780	2.6	1.1	.5	.1	10.3

=== EuroLeague ===
Year	Team	GP	GS	MPG	FG%	3P%	FT%	RPG	APG	SPG	BPG	PPG	PIR
2021–22	Monaco	**29**	3	25.1	**.461**	**.419**	.803	3.1	1.1	**1.0**	.0	14.0	10.6
2022–23	Panathinaikos	27	**27**	**30.5**	.444	.297	**.810**	**3.5**	**2.0**	.7	**.1**	**16.6**	**12.8**
Career		56	30	27.5	.453	.346	.807	3.3	1.5	.9	.1	15.2	11.6

=== Domestic leagues ===
Season	Team	League	GP	MPG	FG%	3P%	FT%	RPG	APG	SPG	BPG	PPG
2021–22	(France) Monaco	LNB Élite	16	24.6	.435	.264	.672	4.2	1.4	.5	.1	13.1
2022–23	(Greece) Panathinaikos	GBL	16	24.1	.478	.422	.800	3.9	2.1	.7	.1	13.1
2023–24	(China) Shanghai	CBA	41	22.6	.458	.325	.848	5.0	2.7	.7	.2	22.9
2024–25	(Russia) Zenit	VTBUL	58	26.9	.422	.322	.833	3.9	2.2	.9	.2	17.6

=== College ===
Year	Team	GP	GS	MPG	FG%	3P%	FT%	RPG	APG	SPG	BPG	PPG
2015–16	Florida State	34	32	**28.8**	.447	.281	.714	**5.8**	1.5	**1.0**	.0	15.8
2016–17	Florida State	**35**	**35**	**28.8**	**.452**	**.333**	**.754**	4.2	**1.7**	**1.0**	**.1**	**17.2**
Career		69	67	28.8	.449	.312	.733	5.0	1.6	1.0	.1	16.5

== Personal life ==
His younger brother, Raheem, professionally known as "350Heem," was a rap artist. On July 28, 2023, Raheem was shot and killed after his album release party in Lakeland, Florida. Bacon earned his Bachelor's Degree on July 31, 2026 from Florida State University.
