= Rochelle High School =

Rochelle High School may refer to:

- Rochelle Township High School, school in Rochelle, Illinois, United States
- Rochelle High School (Florida), former school in Lakeland, Florida, United States
