= Jacob Summerlin Jr. =

American cattleman (1820–1893)

Jacob Summerlin

Jacob Summerlin (February 20, 1820 – November 4, 1893), aka the King of the Crackers and King of the Cracker Cow Hunters, was documented as the first child born in Florida after the land was ceded by Spain (see the Adams-Onis Treaty). This was again validated in about 2012-15 during Florida's 500-year celebration, as Florida honored him as one of three people who were most influential in the previous 500 years, along with Ponce de Leon.

Summerlin was known for his contributions to the early settlement of Florida, and especially for founding the county seats of Orange and Polk counties, which are Orlando and Bartow, respectively. In the years prior to the American Civil War, he was given slaves, whom he relinquished in exchange for cattle.

Summerlin was a highly successful Florida Cracker cattleman, working up and down Florida, shipping Florida Cracker cattle to Cuba for most of his life.

Prior to school integration, Summerlin Academy, the school for White students in Bartow, was named for him. After the schools were integrated in 1968, all students attended there, and the name was changed to Bartow High School. Summerlin Academy was reestablished in 2006 as a military school within Bartow High School.

Summerlin donated Lake Eola and land surrounding the lake in Orlando. This was named Lake Eola by his son, Judge Robert Summerlin. for a woman he loved. Robert graduated with a law degree from Georgia in 1885-87, became mayor of Orlando for about 1885 to 1892, then was elected judge.

== "King of the Crackers" ==
Summerlin earned much of his early fortune by hard work, personally driving cattle throughout Florida and raising cattle along the Peace River and Kissimmee River, night and day. Wild cattle brought to North America by the Spanish conquistadors roamed free across these vast stretches of land. Entrepreneurs could capture, breed, drive, and sell these cows for twelve to sixteen dollars each. Summerlin and his business partners developed a lucrative trade with Havana and with the US naval base at Key West.

Summerlin opposed secession, indicating that he did not want to be part of a civil war. However, after the breakout of the American Civil War, he was quoted in official documents as saying that he never killed any person. He fed soldiers in the war, as was ordered, of both Confederate and Union armies. He and his partners provided beef and medicine to troops of both armies. Separately and privately, he still sailed past the Union blockade, mostly at night, to continue cattle sales to Cuba as usual.

As a result of the war, Confederate money was worthless. However, with hard work and Union money that he earned, Summerlin bought the 160-acre (0.65 km²) Blount homestead, much of which would later be given to Polk County. (Ft. Blount was the earlier name of Bartow, the present county seat.) After the war, he continued selling cattle to the Union soldiers at Fort Myers.

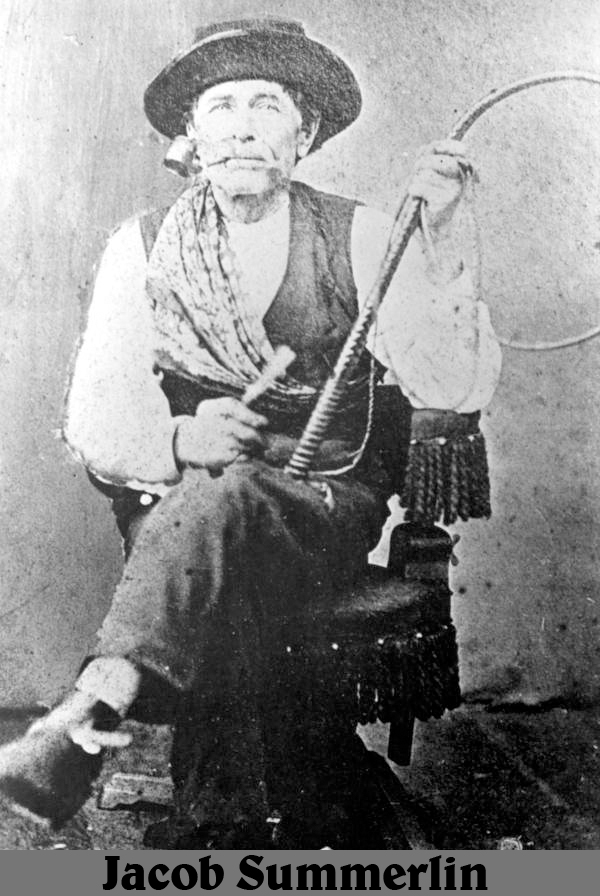
Jacob Summerlin

Summerlin amassed a fortune of 15,000 to 20,000 head of cattle during this period, and was considered one of the wealthiest Floridians before he reached age 40. In this pre-banking era, he kept his gold and silver at his cabin in trunks, meal sacks, tin meat cans, woolen socks, or cigar boxes; behind door frames; in the rafters; or tossed in a corner. He used his wealth to purchase large tracts of land sprawling from Fort Meade to Fort Myers. He bought a wharf at Punta Rassa and a thousand acres (4 km²) nearby for cow pens, some of which he rented to other cattlemen.

== Donations in Bartow and Orlando ==
In 1867, Summerlin donated 120 acres (0.5 km²) of the Blount homestead land in the present-day town of Bartow for an institution of learning (then named the Summerlin Institute, now called Bartow High School, founded 1887), 40 acres (160,000 m^{2}) for establishment of a county seat, and 20 acres (81,000 m^{2}) for each of the town's two churches (Methodist and Baptist). He also personally donated $1100 for construction of Bartow's first two-story building, which housed the Masonic lodge and school.

Summerlin also owned land in Orange County, where he opened the Summerlin Hotel. When Orlando's wooden courthouse burned in 1868, there was pressure to move the county seat to the then-larger town of Sanford. The county seat had been located nearby in Enterprise across the river from Sanford before 1857. General Henry Sanford was particularly involved in lobbying for the move to Sanford, and offered free land for the new courthouse during a public meeting of the County Commission in 1875. Summerlin sat in the packed audience during Sanford's offer. Legend has it that as Sanford finished speaking, Summerlin rose to his feet and asked if he was done; Sanford replied, "I have".

"Then I will make my offer. The county seat has been located here by the free will of the majority of the settlers; the land has been deeded to that particular purpose. I stand here, ready to build a $10,000 court house, and if the county is ever able to pay me back, all right. If it can't, that's all right, too."

— Jacob Summerlin

The county accepted his offer and repaid him over a 10-year period. Later that year, Orlando became incorporated with a population of 85. On August 4, Summerlin sat on the first Orlando City Council, acting as council president.

Summerlin also donated a large tract of land in order for a fine park to be established in Orlando. In 1883, he came to a city council meeting and offered the land around the lake, on the condition that it be beautified and turned into a park. He also required that the city plant trees and put a "driveway" around the lake. To ensure that the city followed these stipulations, Summerlin put reverter clauses in the contract to allow his heirs to reclaim the property if the city failed in its obligations. That park is still maintained to his orders of it being kept beautiful. His son, Judge Robert L Summerlin, mayor of Orlando, named Lake Eola after his fiancée, who died before they could marry.

== Death ==
Jacob Summerlin died on November 4, 1893, aged 73, and was buried in Oak Hill Cemetery in Bartow.
