= Nate James (American football) =

American football player and track & field athlete (born 1945)

No. 33
- Position: Defensive back

Personal information
- Born: February 20, 1945 (age 81); Bartow, Florida, U.S.
- Listed height: 6 ft 1 in (1.85 m)
- Listed weight: 195 lb (88 kg)

Career information
- High school: Union Academy (Bartow)
- College: Florida A&M
- NFL draft: 1968: 6th round, 152nd overall pick

Career history
- Cleveland Browns (1968)

Career NFL statistics
- Fumble recoveries: 1
- Kick return yards: 166
- Stats at Pro Football Reference

Nathaniel James, known as Nate James, (born February 20, 1945) is a former college football and track star at Florida A&M University (FAMU). He was drafted in 1968 in the sixth round of the National Football League (NFL) by the Cleveland Browns and returned several kicks for the team. He was inducted into the FAMU Hall of Fame in 1990.

James attended segregated Union Academy (Bartow, Florida) where he was coached by Claude Woodruff. James recalled Woodruff as a hardline disciplinarian who had a saying: kill a mosquito with an ax, but go sharpen the ax first.

He was part of the FAMU track and field team that won Penn Relays four years in a row.

In 1968, he was drafted by the Cleveland Browns in the 6th round. He appeared in 12 games for the team.

As of 1990, he had been teaching and coaching in Orange County, Florida for 15 years.
