= Jimmy Patton =

American football player (1933–1972)

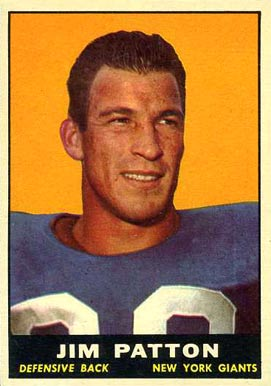
- Patton on a 1961 trading card

No. 20
- Position: Safety

Personal information
- Born: September 29, 1933; Greenville, Mississippi, U.S.
- Died: December 22, 1972 (aged 39); Villa Rica, Georgia, U.S.
- Listed height: 5 ft 10 in (1.78 m)
- Listed weight: 183 lb (83 kg)

Career information
- High school: E.E. Bass (Greenville)
- College: Ole Miss (1951–1954)
- NFL draft: 1955: 8th round, 92nd overall pick

Career history

Playing
- New York Giants (1955–1966)

Coaching
- New York Giants (1962–1964) Assistant defense coach

Awards and highlights
- NFL champion (1956); 5× First-team All-Pro (1958–1962); Second-team All-Pro (1963); 5× Pro Bowl (1958–1962); NFL interceptions leader (1958); New York Giants Ring of Honor; 20th greatest New York Giant of all-time; Mississippi Sports Hall of Fame (1972)

Career NFL statistics
- Interceptions: 52
- Interception yards: 712
- Fumble recoveries: 15
- Total touchdowns: 4
- Stats at Pro Football Reference

James Russell Patton (September 29, 1933 – December 22, 1972) was an American professional football player who was a defensive back in the National Football League (NFL) for the New York Giants. He was a five-time Pro Bowl selection and five-time first-team All-Pro.

== Early life ==
Patton played college football at the University of Mississippi. He would play both running back and safety for the Rebels from 1952 to 1954. He was co-captain of the team in his senior season, which won the Southeastern Conference for the first time since 1947. In 1992, he was named as a member of the Ole Miss Team of the Century. He was drafted 92nd overall in the eighth round of the 1955 NFL draft.

== Professional career ==
Patton played sparingly in his rookie year, but he made his mark known. On October 30, he served as a returner on three kicks and returned two for touchdowns while recording his first interception in a 35–7 victory over Washington. It was the only interception he recorded that year. Patton had an interception for his second season, but he found himself at a disadvantage next to heavier players that weighed more than his 180-pound frame. Deciding to increase speed, he would play with no hip pads but also played strategy. When once asked how he would deal with a player such as Jim Brown when breaking up the middle, he stated the following: “I don't watch his head. He can fake me with his head. I watch his belt buckle and I keep my eye on it, just the way a batter watches a baseball. He can't wiggle that belt buckle.” He also stated that he would essentially try to pinpoint the location of a pass coming for a receiver within the vicinity of their wishbone.

In 1956, Patton made his first postseason start that year when the Giants went 9–3–1. Facing the Chicago Bears for the 1956 NFL Championship Game, Patton recorded an interception alongside teammate Bill Svoboda as the Giants cruised to a 47–7 victory. It was the only championship that Patton would win in his career, as while the Giants reached the playoffs five further times from 1958 to 1963, they would lose in the NFL Championship Game each time; Patton's one interception in the 1956 game was his only postseason interception of his career. Patton led the NFL in interceptions in 1958. In that season, he played in all twelve games of the season and had an interception in seven of them, with four of them seeing him pick a pass off twice. He was the first Giant to lead the league in interceptions since Otto Schnellbacher in 1951. While Patton only recorded five interceptions the following year, he was named an All-Pro and Pro Bowler again. This was also the case for the next three seasons, where he recorded six, eight, and seven interceptions. 1963 was his first non-All Pro season in five years, but he recorded six interceptions, which happened in five games. He had his final multi-interception game on December 8 against Washington.

Patton recorded his final interception on December 18, 1966, against the Dallas Cowboys.

== Death ==
On December 22, 1972, Patton was killed in an automobile accident near Villa Rica, Georgia. He was driving alone in his car when he was struck by an oncoming vehicle while attempting to pass another car. He was driving to Maryland to see his sister (Thelma Josphine Deweber) who was dying of cancer as reported by his sons.

== Legacy & Hall of Fame Credentials ==
Allie Sherman, who coached Patton in his later years, called him a competitor who “had the three qualities found in the best players —consistency, top performance and great heart.” In 1972, he was named to the Mississippi Sports Hall of Fame.

Patton is second in Giants history for most interceptions next to Emlen Tunnell, who he played with for four seasons; Tunnell was among numerous defensive teammates that Patton played with that ended up in the Pro Football Hall of Fame, which included Sam Huff and Andy Robustelli. When Patton retired, he was one of only seven players with fifty career interceptions. Among the three players with the same amount of 52 interceptions as him in Jack Butler and Bobby Dillon, Patton is the only one that is not a member of the Hall of Fame, and he also is the only one of ten defensive backs with five First-team All-Pro selections not in the Hall. The Professional Football Researchers Association named Patton to the "PRFA Hall of Very Good" class of 2010. Patton was inducted into the New York Giants Ring of Honor in 2022.

== See also ==
- List of National Football League career interceptions leaders
