= Van Green =

American football player (born 1951)

No. 21
- Position: Defensive back

Personal information
- Born: April 21, 1951 (age 75); Auburndale, Florida, U.S.
- Listed height: 6 ft 1 in (1.85 m)
- Listed weight: 192 lb (87 kg)

Career information
- High school: Auburndale (Florida)
- College: Shaw
- NFL draft: 1973: 6th round, 150th overall pick

Career history
- Cleveland Browns (1973–1976); Buffalo Bills (1976)

Career NFL statistics
- Interceptions: 3
- Fumble recoveries: 4
- Defensive TDs: 2
- Stats at Pro Football Reference

Van Harold Green (born April 21, 1951) is an American former professional football player who was a defensive back for four seasons in the National Football League (NFL) with the Cleveland Browns and Buffalo Bills. He was selected by the Browns in the sixth round of the 1973 NFL draft after playing college football for the Shaw Bears.

== Early life and college ==
Van Harold Green was born on April 21, 1951, in Auburndale, Florida. He attended Auburndale High School.

Green played college football for the Bears of Shaw University. He was inducted into the Shaw University Athletics Hall of Fame in 1991.

== Professional career ==
Green was selected by the Cleveland Browns in the sixth round, with the 150th overall pick, of the 1973 NFL draft. He played in all 14 games, starting five, for the Browns as a rookie in 1973 and returned two fumble recoveries for 15 yards and one touchdown. He started all 14 games during the 1974 season, totaling two interceptions for 56 yards and one touchdown, one fumble recovery, and one reception for 27 yards as the Browns finished 4–10. Green appeared in all 14 games for the third straight year in 1975, starting seven, and recorded one interception and one fumble recovery. He played in one game in 1976 before being released by the Browns on September 15, 1976.

Green signed with the Buffalo Bills on September 24, 1976. He played in five games for the Bills during the 1976 season. He was released on August 31, 1977.
