= See Art Orlando =

See Art Orlando (SAO) is a non-profit founded by Jennifer Quigley that raises money to install public art in the City of Orlando. In 2013, SAO installed eight sculptures in downtown Orlando. Most of the sculptures are at Lake Eola Park. All of the sculptures are commissioned and installed using private donations.

The seven sculptures of the eight that have been installed are:

- "Union" by Ralfonso Gschwendon the corner of Robinson St and Eola Dr
- "Centered" by CJ Rench on Central Blvd across from the Waverly Building
- "Global Convergence" by Deedee Morrison at Heritage Park by the Orange County Regional History Center
- "Cedar of Lebanon" by Jake Harmeling on the corner of Central and Osceola next to Post Parkside
- "Take Flight" by Douwe Blumberg on Lake Eola by Robinson
- "Astrogenesis II" by Wendy Ross at Signature Plaza on the corner of Orange Ave and Church St
- “Monument in Right Foot Major” by Todji Kurtzman at the southwest corner of Lake Eola Park
