= List of NFL career interceptions leaders =

In American football, an interception (INT), also known as a pick, occurs when a pass intended for a player of the same team is caught by an opposition player, who then gains possession for their team. The National Football League (NFL) did not begin keeping official records until the 1932 season and did not begin tracking interceptions until 1940. As a result of the AFL–NFL merger, league record books also recognize statistics from the American Football League (AFL), which operated from 1960 to 1969 before being absorbed into the NFL in 1970.

There have been 39 players who have recorded at least 50 interceptions. Paul Krause is the all-time leader, with 81 interceptions. Due to rule changes and increasingly detailed offensive schemes, among other factors, the rate of interceptions has dropped considerably from 1971 (5.78%) to 2018 (2.37%). As of 2026, Harrison Smith is the only active player that has at least 40 interceptions.

== Players with at least 50 interceptions ==
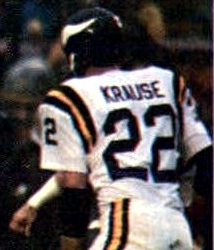
Paul Krause has the most interceptions in NFL history

Key
Symbol	Meaning
Ints	The total number of interceptions the player had
†	Inducted into the Pro Football Hall of Fame
^	Active player

NFL career interceptions leaders
Rank	Player	Position	Team(s)	Ints	Refs
1	Paul Krause †	Safety	Washington Redskins (1964–1967)	81	
1	Paul Krause †	Safety	Minnesota Vikings (1968–1979)	81	
2	Emlen Tunnell †	Defensive back	New York Giants (1948–1958)	79	
2	Emlen Tunnell †	Defensive back	Green Bay Packers (1959–1961)	79	
3	Rod Woodson †	Defensive back	Pittsburgh Steelers (1987–1996)	71	
3	Rod Woodson †	Defensive back	San Francisco 49ers (1997)	71	
3	Rod Woodson †	Defensive back	Baltimore Ravens (1998–2001)	71	
3	Rod Woodson †	Defensive back	Oakland Raiders (2002–2003)	71	
4	Dick Lane †	Cornerback	Los Angeles Rams (1952–1953)	68	
4	Dick Lane †	Cornerback	Chicago Cardinals (1954–1959)	68	
4	Dick Lane †	Cornerback	Detroit Lions (1960–1965)	68	
5	Ken Riley †	Cornerback	Cincinnati Bengals (1969–1983)	65	
5	Charles Woodson †	Defensive back	Oakland Raiders (1998–2005, 2013–2015)	65	
5	Charles Woodson †	Defensive back	Green Bay Packers (2006–2012)	65	
7	Ed Reed †	Safety	Baltimore Ravens (2002–2012)	64	
7	Ed Reed †	Safety	Houston Texans (2013)	64	
7	Ed Reed †	Safety	New York Jets (2013)	64	
8	Ronnie Lott †	Defensive back	San Francisco 49ers (1981–1990)	63	
8	Ronnie Lott †	Defensive back	Los Angeles Raiders (1991–1992)	63	
8	Ronnie Lott †	Defensive back	New York Jets (1993–1994)	63	
8	Darren Sharper	Safety	Green Bay Packers (1997–2004)	63	
8	Darren Sharper	Safety	Minnesota Vikings (2005–2008)	63	
8	Darren Sharper	Safety	New Orleans Saints (2009–2010)	63	
10	Dave Brown	Defensive back	Pittsburgh Steelers (1975)	62	
10	Dave Brown	Defensive back	Seattle Seahawks (1976–1986)	62	
10	Dave Brown	Defensive back	Green Bay Packers (1987–1989)	62	
10	Dick LeBeau †	Defensive back	Detroit Lions (1959–1972)	62	
12	Emmitt Thomas †	Defensive back	Kansas City Chiefs (1966–1978)	58	
13	Mel Blount †	Defensive back	Pittsburgh Steelers (1970–1983)	57	
13	Bobby Boyd	Cornerback	Baltimore Colts (1960–1968)	57	
13	Eugene Robinson	Safety	Seattle Seahawks (1985–1995)	57	
13	Eugene Robinson	Safety	Green Bay Packers (1996–1997)	57	
13	Eugene Robinson	Safety	Atlanta Falcons (1998–1999)	57	
13	Eugene Robinson	Safety	Carolina Panthers (2000)	57	
13	Johnny Robinson †	Defensive back	Dallas Texans / Kansas City Chiefs (1960–1971)	57	
13	Everson Walls	Cornerback	Dallas Cowboys (1981–1989)	57	
13	Everson Walls	Cornerback	New York Giants (1990–1992)	57	
13	Everson Walls	Cornerback	Cleveland Browns (1992–1993)	57	
18	Lem Barney †	Cornerback	Detroit Lions (1967–1977)	56	
18	Pat Fischer	Defensive back	St. Louis Cardinals (1961–1967)	56	
18	Pat Fischer	Defensive back	Washington Redskins (1968–1977)	56	
20	Aeneas Williams †	Defensive back	Phoenix / Arizona Cardinals (1991–2000)	55	
20	Aeneas Williams †	Defensive back	St. Louis Rams (2001–2004)	55	
21	Darrell Green †	Defensive back	Washington Redskins (1983–2002)	54	
21	Willie Brown †	Cornerback	Denver Broncos (1963–1966)	54	
21	Willie Brown †	Cornerback	Oakland Raiders (1967–1978)	54	
21	Eric Allen †	Cornerback	Philadelphia Eagles (1988–1994)	54	
21	Eric Allen †	Cornerback	New Orleans Saints (1995–1997)	54	
21	Eric Allen †	Cornerback	Oakland Raiders (1998–2001)	54	
24	Ty Law †	Cornerback	New England Patriots (1995–2004)	53	
24	Ty Law †	Cornerback	New York Jets (2005, 2008)	53	
24	Ty Law †	Cornerback	Kansas City Chiefs (2006–2007)	53	
24	Ty Law †	Cornerback	Denver Broncos (2009)	53	
24	Deion Sanders †	Cornerback	Atlanta Falcons (1989–1993)	53	
24	Deion Sanders †	Cornerback	San Francisco 49ers (1994)	53	
24	Deion Sanders †	Cornerback	Dallas Cowboys (1995–1999)	53	
24	Deion Sanders †	Cornerback	Washington Redskins (2000)	53	
24	Deion Sanders †	Cornerback	Baltimore Ravens (2004–2005)	53	
26	Champ Bailey †	Cornerback	Washington Redskins (1999–2003)	52	
26	Champ Bailey †	Cornerback	Denver Broncos (2004–2013)	52	
26	Jack Butler †	Defensive back	Pittsburgh Steelers (1951–1959)	52	
26	Bobby Dillon †	Defensive back	Green Bay Packers (1952–1959)	52	
26	Jimmy Patton	Safety	New York Giants (1955–1966)	52	
26	Mel Renfro †	Defensive back	Dallas Cowboys (1964–1977)	52	
26	Larry Wilson †	Safety	St. Louis Cardinals (1960–1972)	52	
32	Bobby Bryant	Defensive back	Minnesota Vikings (1968–1980)	51	
32	Asante Samuel	Cornerback	New England Patriots (2003–2007)	51	
32	Asante Samuel	Cornerback	Philadelphia Eagles (2008–2011)	51	
32	Asante Samuel	Cornerback	Atlanta Falcons (2012–2013)	51	
32	Donnie Shell †	Defensive back	Pittsburgh Steelers (1974–1987)	51	
35	Terrell Buckley	Defensive back	Green Bay Packers (1992–1994)	50	
35	Terrell Buckley	Defensive back	Miami Dolphins (1995–1999, 2003)	50	
35	Terrell Buckley	Defensive back	Denver Broncos (2000)	50	
35	Terrell Buckley	Defensive back	New England Patriots (2001–2002)	50	
35	Terrell Buckley	Defensive back	New York Jets (2004)	50	
35	Terrell Buckley	Defensive back	New York Giants (2005)	50	
35	Don Burroughs	Safety	Los Angeles Rams (1955–1959)	50	
35	Don Burroughs	Safety	Philadelphia Eagles (1960–1964)	50	
35	Deron Cherry	Safety	Kansas City Chiefs (1981–1991)	50	
35	John Harris	Safety	Seattle Seahawks (1978–1985)	50	
35	John Harris	Safety	Minnesota Vikings (1986–1988)	50	
35	Yale Lary †	Defensive back	Detroit Lions (1952–1964)	50	

== Historical career interceptions leaders ==
NFL historical career interceptions leaders
No.	Reign	Player	Team(s) while leader	Ints	Season(s)	Refs
1	1940	Don Hutson†	Green Bay Packers	6	1940	
1	1940	Ace Parker†	Brooklyn Dodgers	6	1940	
1	1940	Kent Ryan	Detroit Lions	6	1940	
2	1941	George McAfee†	Chicago Bears	10	1941	
3	1942	Don Hutson†	Green Bay Packers	14	1942	
4	1943–1948	Sammy Baugh†	Washington Redskins	23	1943	
4	1943–1948	Sammy Baugh†	Washington Redskins	27	1944	
4	1943–1948	Sammy Baugh†	Washington Redskins	31	1945–1948	
5	Tied 1948	Irv Comp	Green Bay Packers	31	1948	
5	1949–1950	Irv Comp	Green Bay Packers	34	1949–1950	
6	1951	Frank Reagan	Philadelphia Eagles	35	1951	
7	1952–1978	Emlen Tunnell†	New York Giants (1952–1958); Green Bay Packers (1959–1961)	40	1952	
7	1952–1978	Emlen Tunnell†	New York Giants (1952–1958); Green Bay Packers (1959–1961)	46	1953	
7	1952–1978	Emlen Tunnell†	New York Giants (1952–1958); Green Bay Packers (1959–1961)	54	1954	
7	1952–1978	Emlen Tunnell†	New York Giants (1952–1958); Green Bay Packers (1959–1961)	61	1955	
7	1952–1978	Emlen Tunnell†	New York Giants (1952–1958); Green Bay Packers (1959–1961)	67	1956	
7	1952–1978	Emlen Tunnell†	New York Giants (1952–1958); Green Bay Packers (1959–1961)	73	1957	
7	1952–1978	Emlen Tunnell†	New York Giants (1952–1958); Green Bay Packers (1959–1961)	74	1958	
7	1952–1978	Emlen Tunnell†	New York Giants (1952–1958); Green Bay Packers (1959–1961)	76	1959	
7	1952–1978	Emlen Tunnell†	New York Giants (1952–1958); Green Bay Packers (1959–1961)	79	1960–1978	
8	1979–present	Paul Krause†	Minnesota Vikings	81	1979	

== See also ==
- List of NFL annual interceptions leaders
