= Griffin Elementary School =

- Griffin Grammar School
- U.S. National Register of Historic Places
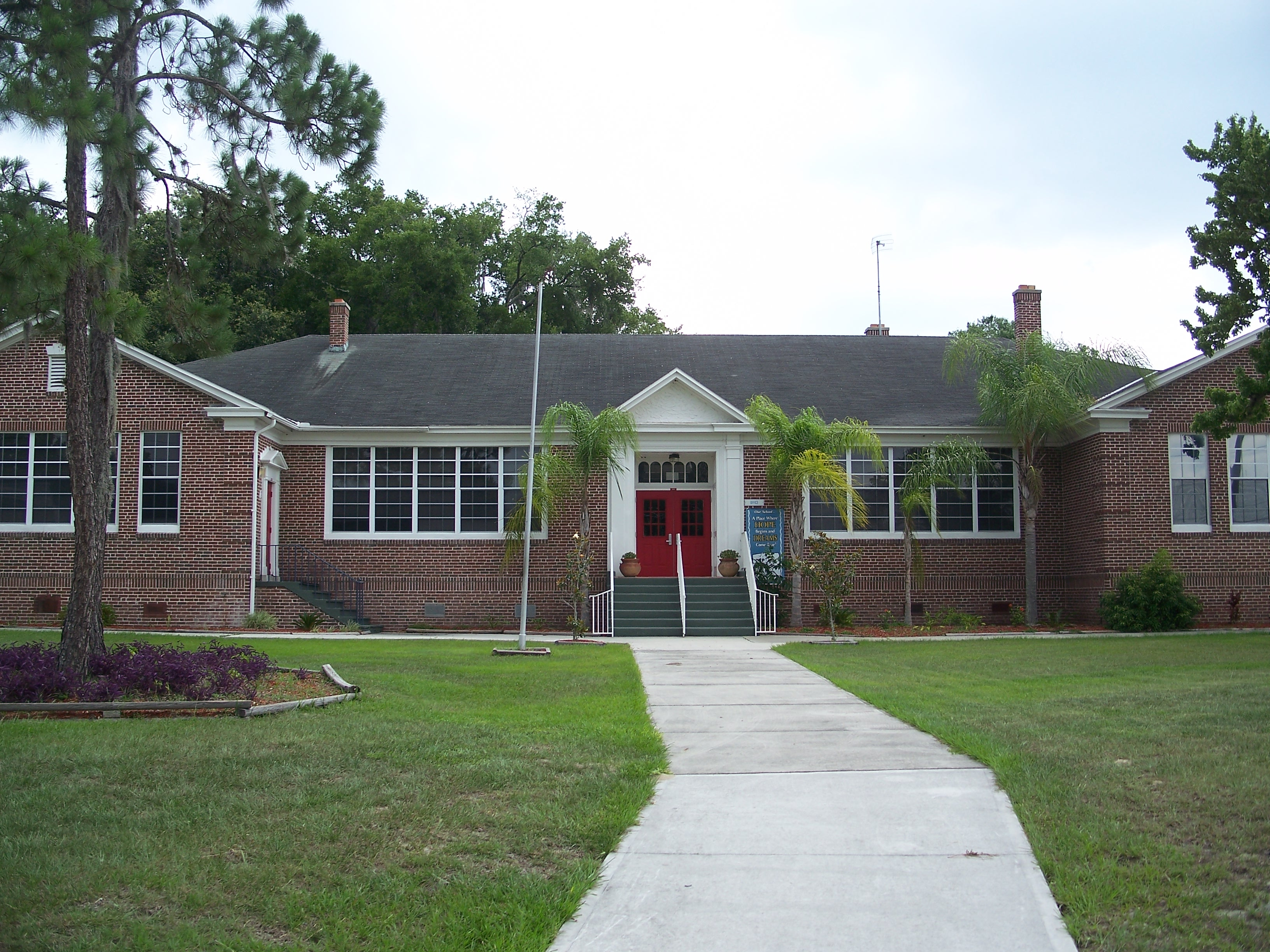

- Location within Florida Location within the United States
- Location: 3315 Kathleen Rd., Lakeland, Florida
- Coordinates: 28°05′05″N 81°59′41″W
- Built: 1932; 94 years ago
- NRHP reference No.: 07000509
- Added to NRHP: June 5, 2007

The Griffin Elementary School is a school building northwest of Lakeland, Florida. It is part of the Polk County Public Schools district. The original school building was built in 1932. On June 5, 2007, this building was added to the U.S. National Register of Historic Places as the Griffin Grammar School.

== Gallery ==
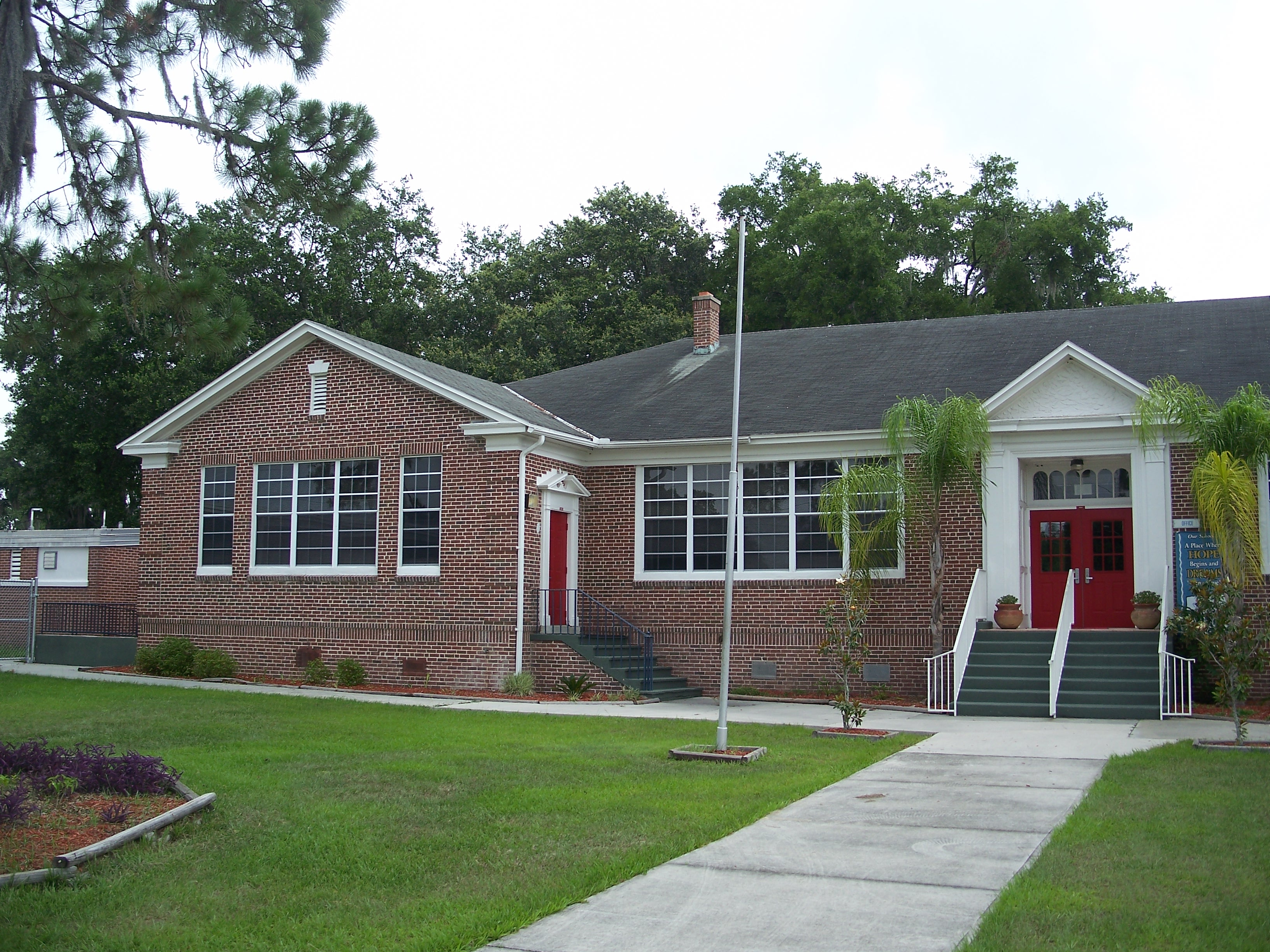

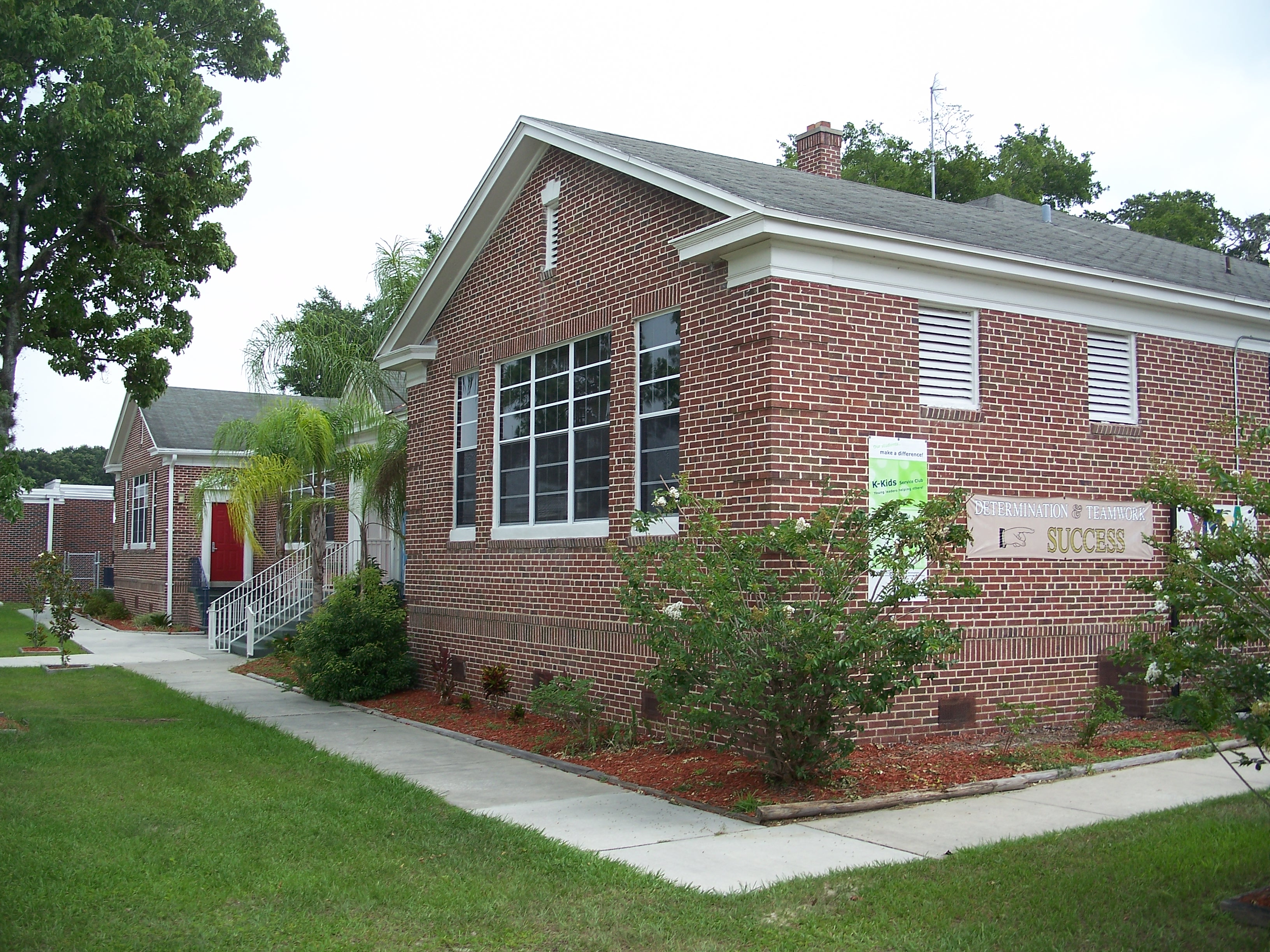

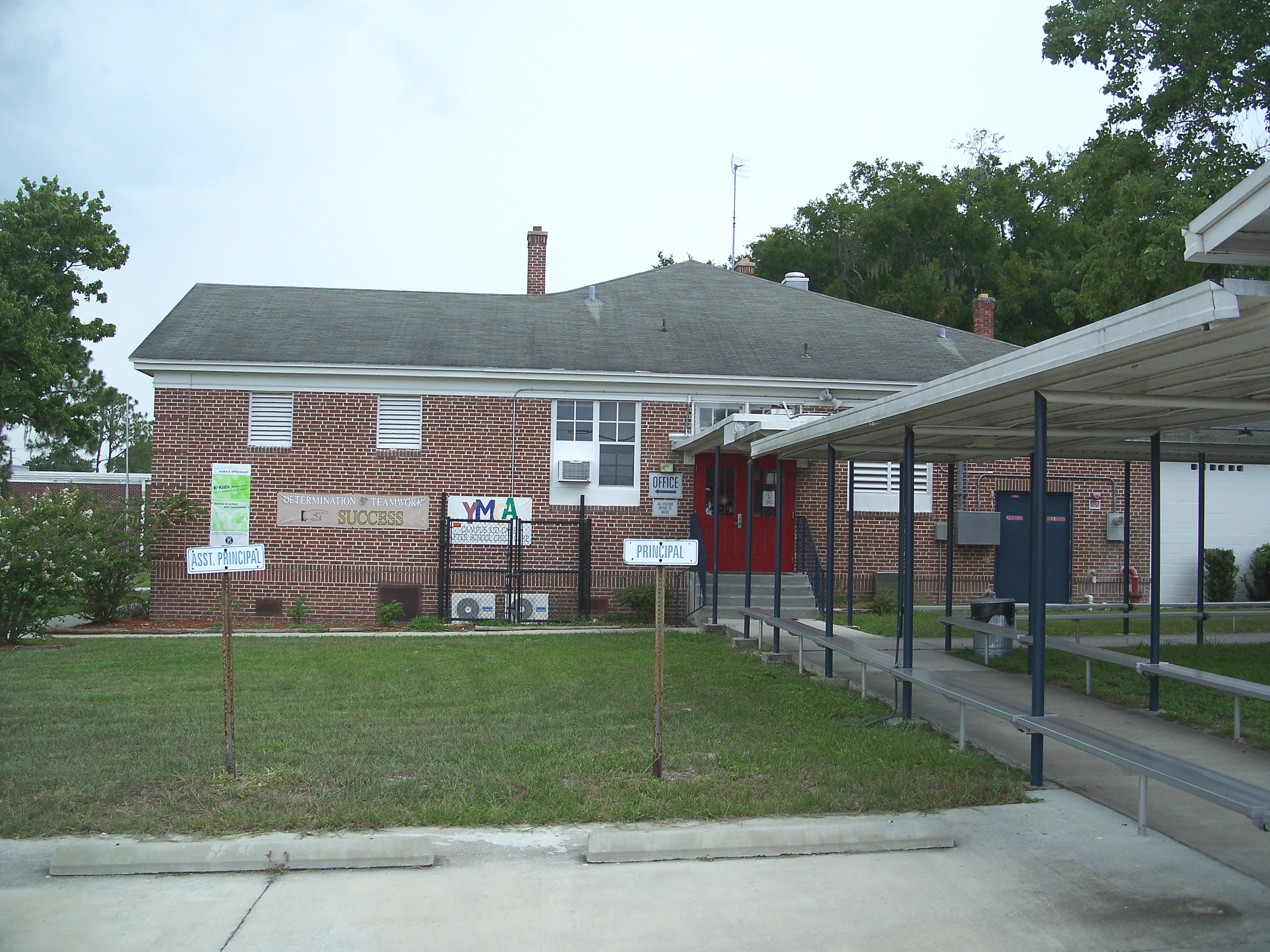
