= Polk County Public Schools =

Public school district of Polk County, Florida, United States

Location
- Polk County, Florida; United States

District information
- Grades: Pre-school through 12th
- Superintendent: Frederick Heid

Other information
- Website: www.polkschoolsfl.com

Polk County Public Schools is a school district headquartered in Bartow, Florida, United States. The district serves Polk County.

== History ==
=== Civil rights era ===
Before 1965, Polk County maintained two separate school systems, one for white students, and a separate system for non-white students. In 1963, a group of parents of Black students attempted to have their children admitted to the all-white schools. When their applications were denied by the school board, they filed suit in federal district court. In early 1965, a federal judge ordered the schools to formulate a plan to integrate both students and teachers, and provide equal facilities and programs for all students regardless of race. For 1965, the district instituted a sham desegregation plan. In 1969, after additional adverse federal rulings, the district adopted another plan which also proved to be ineffective at integrating the schools. The schools became substantially integrated by 1994.

=== 2020s ===
By October 13, 2021, 17 employees died in the COVID-19 pandemic in Florida, with 15 of them having started work for the fall semester.

== Controversies ==
=== Intelligent design controversy ===
In November 2007, four Polk County School Board members interviewed by The Ledger daily newspaper said they would support a resolution advising the Florida Board of Education to revise proposed science standards to include alternative theories to evolution.

=== Expulsion of student for science experiment ===
In 2013 the district expelled a 16-year-old girl after her experiment mixing household materials resulted in a small explosion. The student was arrested and charged with possession/discharge of a weapon on school property and discharging a destructive device. Scientists posted tweets condemning the district's response. Tiffany Madison of the Washington Times argued that the district's punishment reflected American schools becoming "mindless, bureaucratic prisons".

== School uniforms ==
The district requires all students in Kindergarten through 8th grade to wear school uniforms.

== Number of schools ==
Polk County Public Schools is one of the largest school districts in the nation, encompassing more than 150 schools and serving more than 100,000 students through both traditional K-12 schools and a variety of other programs.

== High schools ==
- Auburndale Senior High School (mascot: Bloodhounds)
- Bartow Senior High School (Yellow Jackets)
- Chain of Lakes Collegiate High School (Eagles)
- Davenport Senior High School (Broncos)
- Fort Meade Middle-Senior High School (Miners)
- Frostproof Middle-Senior High School (Bulldogs)
- Gause Academy of Leadership (Tigers)
- George Jenkins Senior High School (Eagles)
- Haines City Senior High School (Hornets)
- Jewett High School Former black high school in Winter Haven prior to integration
- Harrison School for the Arts
- Kathleen Senior High School (Red Devils)
- Lake Gibson Senior High School (Braves)
- Lake Region Senior High School (Thunder)
- Lakeland Senior High School (Dreadnaughts)
- Lake Wales High School (Highlanders)
- McKeel Academy of Technology (Wildcats)
- Mulberry High School (Panthers)
- Navigator Academy of Leadership High School (Charter School)
- Polk State College Lakeland Collegiate High School (Eagles) (Charter School)
- Ridge Community High School (Bolts)
- Rochelle School of the Arts Black high school prior to integration; now a K-8 magnet.
- Roosevelt High School, a black high school in Lake Wales prior to integration.
- Tenoroc Senior High School (Titans)
- Union Academy Former black high school before integration; now a middle school
- Winter Haven Senior High School (Blue Devils)

== Middle schools ==
- Bartow Middle
- Citrus Ridge: A Civics Academy
- Crystal Lake Middle
- Daniel Jenkins Academy (Cambridge School)
- Davenport School of the Arts (magnet)
- Denison Middle
- Doris A Sanders Learning Center
- Dundee Ridge Middle
- Fort Meade Middle-Senior
- Frostproof Middle-Senior
- Gause Academy of Leadership
- Jean O'Dell Learning Center
- Jere L. Stambaugh Middle
- Jewett Middle Academy
- Jewett School of the Arts
- Karen M. Siegel Academy
- Kathleen Middle
- Lake Alfred Polytech Academy
- Lake Gibson Middle
- Lake Marion Creek Middle
- Lakeland Highlands Middle
- Language & Literacy Academy
- Lawton Chiles Middle Academy
- McLaughlin Middle School and Fine Arts Academy
- Mulberry Middle
- New Beginnings High
- REAL Academy
- Rochelle School of the Arts
- Roosevelt Academy
- Rosabelle W. Blake Academy
- Shelley S. Boone Middle
- Sleepy Hill Middle
- Southwest Middle
- Union Academy
- Westwood Middle

== Elementary schools ==
- Alta Vista Elementary
- Alturas Elementary
- Auburndale Central Elementary
- Bartow Elementary Academy
- Ben Hill Griffin Jr Elementary
- Bethune Academy
- Carlton Palmore Elementary
- Chain of Lakes Elementary
- Citrus Ridge: A Civics Academy
- Clarence Boswell Elementary
- Cleveland Court Elementary
- Combee Academy (CODE Academy - magnet)
- Crystal Lake Elementary
- Davenport Elementary
- Davenport School of the Arts (magnet)
- Dixieland Elementary
- Doris A Sanders Learning Center
- Dr. N.E. Roberts Elementary
- Dundee Elementary
- Eagle Lake Elementary
- Eastside Elementary
- Edgar Padgett Elementary
- Elbert Elementary
- Floral Avenue Elementary
- Frank E. Brigham Academy
- Fred G. Garner Elementary
- Frostproof Elementary
- Garden Grove Elementary
- Gause Academy of Leadership
- Gibbons Street PreK Center
- Griffin Elementary School
- Highland City Elementary
- Highlands Grove Elementary
- Horizons Elementary
- Inwood Elementary
- James E. Stephens Elementary
- James W. Sikes Elementary
- Jesse Keen Elementary
- Jewett School of the Arts
- Karen M. Siegel Academy
- Kathleen Elementary
- Kingsford Elementary
- Lake Alfred Elementary
- Lake Shipp Elementary
- Laurel Elementary
- Lena Vista Elementary
- Lewis Anna Woodbury Elementary
- Lewis Elementary (PK-3)
- Lincoln Avenue Academy (magnet)
- Loughman Oaks Elementary
- Medulla Elementary
- North Lakeland Elementary
- Oscar J. Pope Elementary
- Palmetto Elementary
- Philip O'Brien Elementary
- Pinewood Elementary
- Polk City Elementary School
- Purcell Elementary
- R. Bruce Wagner Elementary
- R. Clem Churchwell Elementary
- REAL Academy
- Rochelle School of the Arts
- Rosabelle W. Blake Academy
- Sandhill Elementary School
- Scott Lake Elementary School
- Sleepy Hill Elementary
- Snively Elementary
- Socrum Elementary
- Southwest Elementary
- Spessard L. Holland Elementary School
- Spook Hill Elementary
- Valleyview Elementary
- Wahneta Elementary
- Walter Caldwell Elementary
- Wendell Watson Elementary
- Winston Academy of Engineering (magnet)

== K-12 ==
- Doris A Sanders Learning Center
- Jean O'Dell Learning Center
- Karen M. Siegel Academy

== Charter Schools in District ==
- Achievement Academy - Bartow
- Achievement Academy - Lakeland
- Achievement Academy - Winter Haven
- Berkley Accelerated Middle
- Berkley Elementary
- Chain of Lakes Collegiate High School
- Compass Middle Charter
- Cypress Junction Montessori
- Dale R. Fair Babson Park Elementary
- Discovery Academy of Lake Alfred
- Discovery High School
- Edward W. Bok Academy
- Edward W. Bok Academy, North
- Hartridge Academy
- Hillcrest Elementary
- Janie Howard Wilson Elementary
- Lake Wales Senior High
- Lakeland Montessori Middle
- Lakeland Montessori Schoolhouse
- Language & Literacy Academy
- Magnolia Montessori Academy
- McKeel Academy of Technology
- McKeel Central Academy
- Mi Escuela Montessori
- Navigator Academy of Leadership
- New Beginnings High
- Polk Avenue Elementary
- Polk Pre-Collegiate Academy
- Polk State Lakeland Gateway
- Ridgeview Global Studies Academy
- South McKeel Academy
- Victory Ridge Academy
