= Lake Eola Park =

Park in Orlando, Florida, United States

Lake Eola
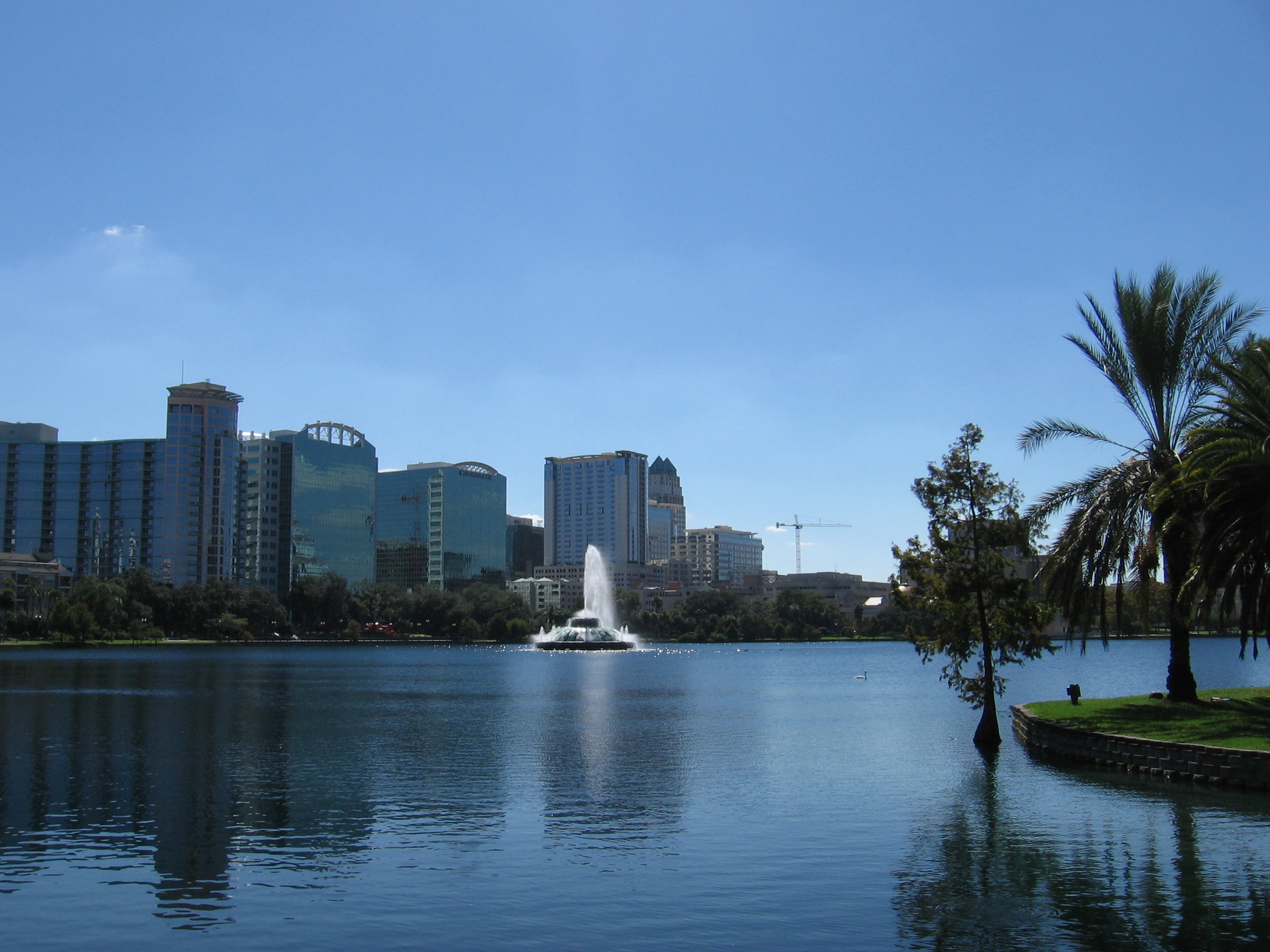
- View from the park site (2006)

- Location within Florida
- Location: Downtown Orlando, Florida
- Coordinates: 28°32′37″N 81°22′22″W
- Type: Sinkhole
- Basin countries: United States
- Surface area: 23 acres (9.3 ha)
- Average depth: 11 feet 5 inches (3.48 m)
- Max. depth: 80 feet 4 inches (24.49 m)
- Water volume: 103,802,700 US gallons (86,433,800 imp gal; 392,936 m^{3})
- Shore length^{1}: 4,493 feet (1,369 m)
- Islands: 1
- ^{1} Shore length is not a well-defined measure.

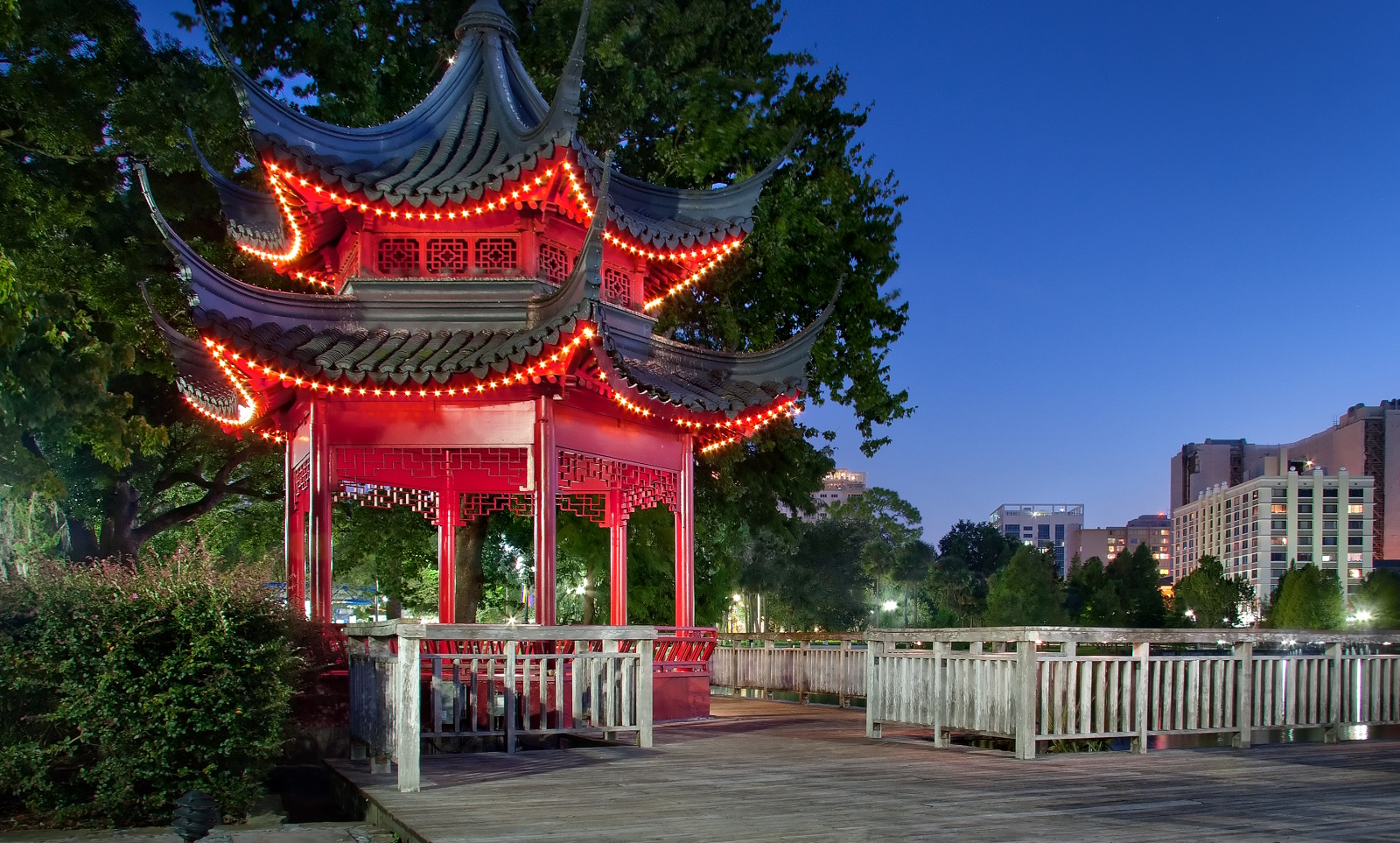
Red pagoda at Lake Eola Park

Lake Eola

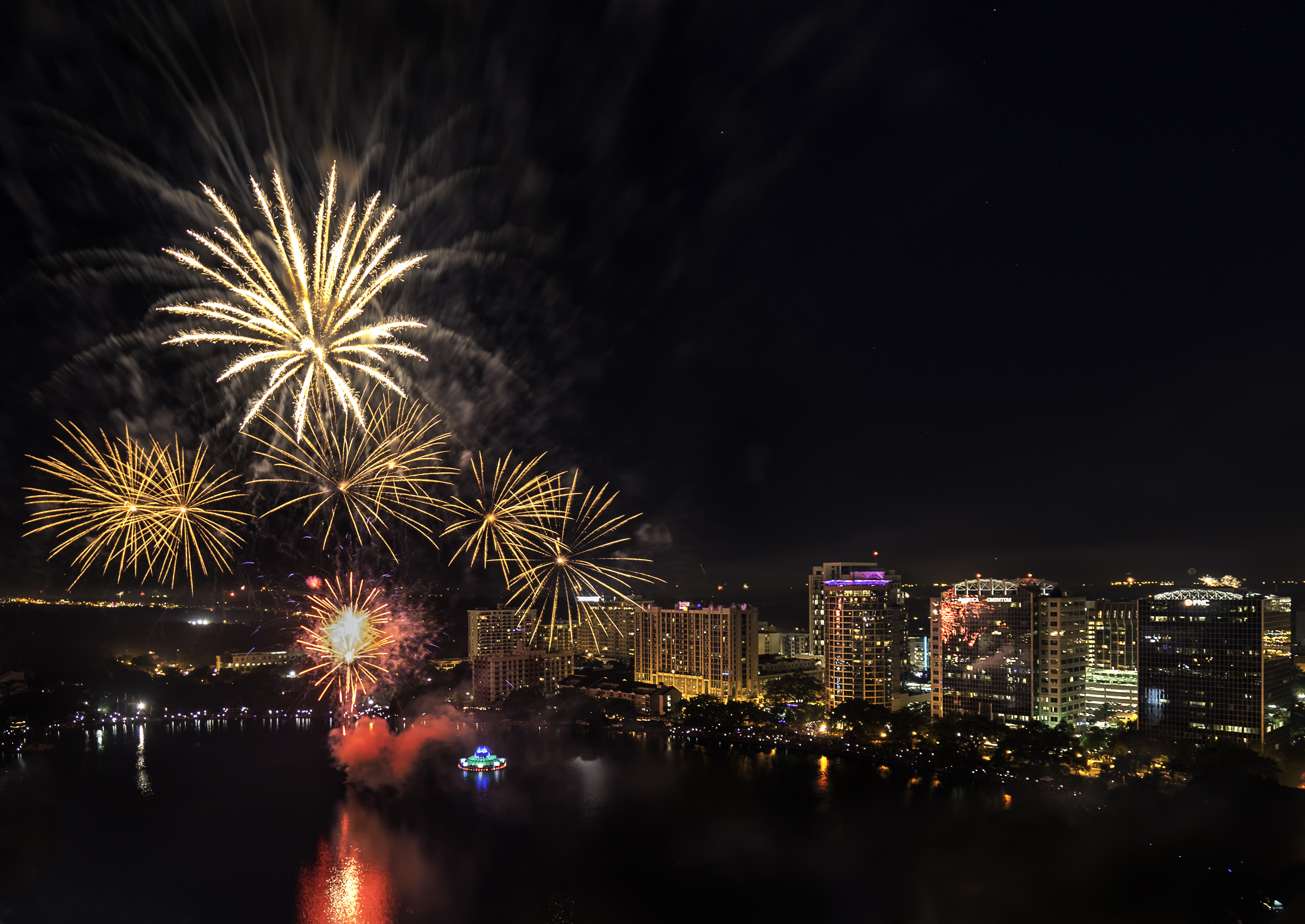
Fourth of July fireworks

Lake Eola Park is a public park located in Downtown Orlando, Florida. Lake Eola is the main feature of the park. Also located in the park (on the west side) is the Walt Disney Amphitheater, which hosts many community events and various performances year round. On the east side of the park is a Chinese pagoda, and a playground. The park is surrounded by four streets: East Robinson Street (State Road 526), Rosalind Avenue (SR 527), East Central Boulevard, and North Eola Drive.

== Lake Eola ==
Lake Eola is a small lake within the South Eola neighborhood of Downtown Orlando, Florida, located at 28°32′37″N 81°22′22″W in Lake Eola Park. The lake is actually a sinkhole and is famous for its fountain. The sinkhole is approximately 80 feet 4 inches (24.49 m) deep and is located 100 feet (30.5 m) east of the fountain. The fountain changes colors at night like a light show. The lake is 4,493 feet (1,369 m) in circumference and 23 acres (9.3 ha) large. A 0.9-mile (1.4 km) multi-use sidewalk surrounds the water.

== History ==
In 1883, wealthy Orlando resident Jacob Summerlin—owner of the Summerlin Hotel, the first City Council president, and financial lender for the construction of Orlando's courthouse in the 1870s—donated a large tract of land to establish a park in Orlando. In 1883, Summerlin came to a city council meeting and offered the land around the lake on the condition that it be beautified and turned into a park. He also required that the city plant trees and put a "driveway" around the lake. To ensure that the city followed through with the stipulations of the donation, Jacob Summerlin, Jr. put reverter clauses in the contract to allow his heirs to reclaim the property if the city failed in its obligations. Several years later, his sons threatened to exercise the reverter clause if the city did not make good on its promise. Today, the park is still maintained according to his requirement that it be kept beautiful.

The park was informally established in 1888 using the first parcel of land; it was the first of many that were donated to the City of Orlando by several families. Jacob Summerlin Jr.'s son, Orlando Mayor (1878-1882) (source California History of the Bench & Bar Southern California 1909) & Judge Robert Summerlin was elected Judge of Volusie County Court, in 1878 as Florida Judge. (California History of the Bench & Bar Southern California 1909)

Judge Robert Summerlin named the lake his father Jacob Summerlin Jr. and mother Fanny (Knight) Summerlin (California History of the Bench & Bar of Southern CA 1909) donated, and where Judge Robert Summerlin built his home, and lived at that lake. Judge Robert Summerlin named Lake Eola, broken hearted, after his fiancee, who tragically died weeks before their wedding.

The area was officially declared a park in 1892. The park area has been home to a zoo; a horse race track; tennis courts; a pier with a dance area; and the broadcast site of a local radio station. The fountain was installed in 1912 at a cost of $10,000. A replacement, originally dubbed the "Centennial Fountain", was installed in 1957 at a cost of $350,000. It was renamed the "Linton E. Allen Memorial Fountain" in 1966 to honor its biggest advocate. The iconic water feature is an official symbol of Orlando.

Lake Eola Park was expanded in 1993 with the closure of Washington Street, which ran between Lee's Lakeside restaurant and the park. With the expansion, the restaurant and Post Parkside Apartments were now located in the park. The International Food Court was also created at this time.

In late August 2009, lightning struck the fountain, rendering it inoperable. The city has a $1 million insurance policy on the fountain, with a $500,000 deductible. Because of the city's then-current budget crisis, the fate of the fountain was unknown. On October 15, 2009, Mayor Buddy Dyer announced that the city would not only repair the fountain, but "also replace its cracked plastic skin and install a state-of-the-art system of lights and water jets" at a cost of $2.3 million. The fountain was rededicated and resumed operation on July 4, 2011.

In July 2013 the park expanded to the southeast to include East Washington Street. The expansion added an extra 1.36 acres of lawn, new LED lighting, widened sidewalks, nearly 4,000 square feet of paved patio and an additional 7,500 square feet of brick paved space on East Washington Street. In September 2013 the City opened Eola House at 512 East Washington Street. The house sits on the expanded part of the park and serves as a welcome center, gift shop and offices for the park. Also in 2013, six sculptures were installed by the non-profit See Art Orlando.

== Events ==
- Spin City Classic (March): sanctioned professional and amateur bicycle racing on the streets around the park.
- Fireworks Over the Fountain (July 4th): celebration, entertainment, and food. Starts at 4 p.m. with fireworks at dark.
- Fiesta in the Park (First full weekend in November, 10 a.m. to 5 p.m.): a 600-booth arts and crafts show with entertainment and food.
- Come Out With Pride (October): LGBT pride festival hosted at the park with a parade, vendors, food, and fireworks at dark.
- The Nutcracker Ballet (December): performed by Russian Ballet Orlando, this ballet has been performed at the Walt Disney Amphitheater every December from 2003 to 2020.
- Lake Eola Park Events are posted monthly on the Walt Disney Amphitheater at Lake Eola billboard on the northwest corner of the park. Additional event and park info is located here.

== Other activities ==
- Orlando Farmers Market: Every Sunday from 10am-3:00pm.

== See also ==
- List of sinkholes of the United States
