= Glenn Martinez =

American football player (born 1981)

No. 12, 17
- Position: Wide receiver

Personal information
- Born: November 30, 1981 (age 44); Auburndale, Florida, U.S.
- Listed height: 6 ft 1 in (1.85 m)
- Listed weight: 195 lb (88 kg)

Career information
- High school: Auburndale
- College: Saginaw Valley State
- NFL draft: 2004: undrafted

Career history
- Pittsburgh Steelers (2004)*; Detroit Lions (2005–2006); → Rhein Fire (2005); Denver Broncos (2007–2008); Houston Texans (2009–2010)
- * Offseason or practice squad member only

Awards and highlights
- First-team All-GLIAC (2003)

Career NFL statistics
- Receptions: 18
- Receiving yards: 218
- Return yards: 614
- Return touchdowns: 1
- Stats at Pro Football Reference

Glenn Martínez (born November 30, 1981) is an American former professional football player who was a wide receiver in the National Football League (NFL). He played college football for the Saginaw Valley State Cardinals and was signed by the Pittsburgh Steelers as an undrafted free agent in 2004.

Martínez was also a member of the Detroit Lions, Denver Broncos and Houston Texans.

== Early life ==
Martinez attended Auburndale High School in Auburndale, Florida and was a student and a letterman in football.

== College career ==
Glenn Martinez attended Saginaw Valley State University from 2000 to 2003. In 2002, as a junior, he was named as an Honorable Mention All-Great Lakes Intercollegiate Athletic Conference and led the team in receiving yards with 814 receiving yards. In 2003, Martinez was named as a first-team All-Great Lakes Intercollegiate Athletic Conference selection.

== Professional career ==
=== Pittsburgh Steelers ===
Martinez originally entered the NFL as an undrafted free agent, signing with the Pittsburgh Steelers in April, 2004. He was released at the end of the preseason during the final roster cut-downs that season.

=== Detroit Lions ===
He returned to the NFL for the 2005 season signing a free agent contract with the Detroit Lions, who then allocated him to NFL Europe where he was selected by the Rhein Fire in the 19th round of the 2005 NFL Allocated Player Draft.

Martinez completed a successful campaign in Europe, finishing with 4 touchdowns, 384 yards on 29 receptions, and finishing third in the league in punt return yardage.

He returned to the Lions for their 2005 training camp and was signed to the practice squad after the preseason. He was later signed to the active squad for week 6 versus the Carolina Panthers. Martinez had his first NFL reception in week 8, an 11-yard reception against the Chicago Bears. After playing in the Lions' week 9 game against the Minnesota Vikings he was again relegated to the practice squad. He would be activated once more for the week 15 game versus the Cincinnati Bengals in which he returned 2 punts and appeared on special teams.

In January 2006, Martinez was again signed by Detroit, but was cut prior to the 2006 NFL season. Martinez was later added to the Practice Squad for the remainder of the 2006 NFL season.

=== Denver Broncos ===
In January 2007, Martinez was signed by the Denver Broncos to a futures contract. He saw action during the 2007 preseason, but was released on 1 September when teams were making mandatory cuts to finalize their opening day roster. Martinez was added to the Denver Broncos Practice Squad. Due to injuries was added to active roster on 29 September 2007 and saw action in week 4 against the Indianapolis Colts, but did not record any stats. In week 5 against the San Diego Chargers he posted a career highs with six catches for 70 yards while adding an 18-yard punt return.

Martinez was waived from the Broncos on November 11, 2008, to make room for running back Tatum Bell.

=== Houston Texans ===
In January 2009, Martinez was signed to a future contract by the Houston Texans. He was released on August 6, 2010.
