= McKeel Academy of Technology =

McKeel Academy of Applied Technology

Location
- Lakeland, Florida; United States; 28.0496°N 81.9841°W

Information
- Type: Charter school
- Established: 1987
- School district: Polk County School District
- Principal: Kim Benson
- Teaching staff: 77.00 (FTE)
- Grades: 7–12
- Enrollment: 1,727 (2022-2023)
- Student to teacher ratio: 22.43
- Colors: Hunter Green, Navy Blue, White, and Red [Seniors only and 11th graders occasionally}
- Mascot: Wildcats
- Yearbook: The Predator
- Website: www.mckeelacademy.com

McKeel Academy of Technology is a junior and senior high school of over 1,000 students located in Lakeland, Florida, United States. It is located approximately a half mile southeast of Kathleen High School and cannot be viewed from any major road. In addition to being technology oriented, the school stresses career choices for each student. The school originally was Seth McKeel Jr High, and became McKeel Academy in the 1990s. McKeel Academy is a school of choice and students from anywhere within Polk County can attend. Entering students are selected through an open enrollment lottery. Students graduating from one of the McKeel Elementary Schools, siblings of current students, students that were previously in South Mckeel Academy, and children of staff members are given priority.

== Growth ==
In 2003, McKeel sponsored the charter and creation of McKeel Elementary Academy or MEA housing approximately 340 K-5 students. South McKeel Elementary Academy (approximately 560 K-5 students) opened in 2006. Both elementary schools have been rated as A schools under Florida's school accountability rating system for every year of their operation.

== Athletics ==
McKeel Academy offers students 20 during fall, winter and spring. Some of the sports offerings include soccer, baseball, golf, cross country and weight lifting. McKeel Academy has won multiple district and regional titles over the years and in 2008 was state runner up in softball. Last year Brock Spurgeon led the baseball team to upset Bishop Verot in a historic upset with a home run off of Joey Lawson.
