= Major Hazelton =

American football player (1943–2023)

No. 49
- Position: Defensive back

Personal information
- Born: September 19, 1943; Bartow, Florida, U.S.
- Died: December 3, 2023 (aged 80); Chicago, Illinois, U.S.
- Listed height: 6 ft 1 in (1.85 m)
- Listed weight: 185 lb (84 kg)

Career information
- High school: Bartow
- College: Florida A&M (1964-1967)
- NFL draft: 1968: 3rd round, 57th overall pick

Career history
- Chicago Bears (1968–1969); New Orleans Saints (1970)

Career NFL statistics
- Fumble recoveries: 2
- Stats at Pro Football Reference

Major Floyd "Stick" Hazelton (September 19, 1943 – December 3, 2023) was a professional football player. He played for the Chicago Bears after being drafted from FAMU where he was a football and track star. He went to Union Academy, a high school for African Americans in Bartow, Florida established during the segregation era. The school produced several star FAMU and NFL players, especially during its Claude Woodruff coaching era.

In college, he played football under legendary coach, Alonzo A. S. Gaither. He earned All-American honors as a defensive back in 1966 and 1967. In addition to football, Hazelton was a star track athlete and was a member of Florida A&M University's 4x100 relay team that won this event three years in a row (1966–68) at the Penn Relays. He is a member of Florida A&M University's Hall of Fame in both football and track and field.

Hazelton played professionally as a 6'2" defensive back after being drafted by the Chicago Bears in the third round (57th overall) during the 1968 NFL/AFL draft. He played in 26 NFL games, starting in two.

He died on December 3, 2023, at the age of 80 in Chicago.
