= Jim Battle (American football) =

American football player (1938–2026)

No. 63, 64
- Position: Guard

Personal information
- Born: February 20, 1938; Bartow, Florida, U.S.
- Died: June 21, 2026 (aged 88); Alberta, Canada
- Listed height: 6 ft 0 in (1.83 m)
- Listed weight: 240 lb (109 kg)

Career information
- High school: Union (Bartow)
- College: Southern Illinois
- NFL draft: 1963: undrafted

Career history
- Minnesota Vikings (1963); Edmonton Eskimos (1964–1965)

Career NFL statistics
- Games played: 14
- Games started: 1
- Stats at Pro Football Reference

Career CFL statistics
- Games played: 21
- Fumble recoveries: 5

James Battle (February 20, 1938 – June 21, 2026) was an American professional football player who was a guard in the National Football League (NFL) and Canadian Football League (CFL). He played college football for the Southern Illinois Salukis. He played in the NFL for 14 games with the Minnesota Vikings before joining the Edmonton Eskimos in the CFL in 1964. Battle played at the end position in college, tallying 85 receptions for 1,010 yards, and was converted to an offensive guard with the Vikings.

Battle attended Union Academy in Bartow, Florida. He later became an educational psychologist following his retirement from professional football, earning a PhD from the University of Alberta in 1972 after which he worked for Edmonton Public Schools. Battle died on June 21, 2026, at the age of 88, having had dementia and Parkinson's disease in his later years.
