= Jerry Simmons (wide receiver) =

American football player (1942–2024)

No. 25, 44, 80
- Position: Wide receiver

Personal information
- Born: November 14, 1942; Nichols, Florida, U.S.
- Died: July 25, 2024 (aged 81)
- Listed height: 6 ft 0 in (1.83 m)
- Listed weight: 190 lb (86 kg)

Career information
- High school: Bartow (FL) Union Academy
- College: Bethune–Cookman
- NFL draft: 1965: undrafted

Career history
- Pittsburgh Steelers (1965–1966); New Orleans Saints (1967); Atlanta Falcons (1967–1969); Chicago Bears (1969–1970); Denver Broncos (1971–1974)

Career NFL statistics
- Receptions: 138
- Receiving yards: 2,105
- Touchdowns: 9
- Stats at Pro Football Reference

Jerry Bernard Simmons (November 14, 1942 – July 25, 2024) was an American football wide receiver. He played college football at Bethune-Cookman University, and professionally for ten seasons in the National Football League (NFL) for the Pittsburgh Steelers, the New Orleans Saints, the Atlanta Falcons, the Chicago Bears, and the Denver Broncos.

After Simmons' playing career, he became an NFL scout. He died on July 25, 2024, at the age of 81.
