= Union Academy (Bartow, Florida) =

Public school in Florida, United States

Location
- Bartow, Polk County, Florida 33830; United States; 27.8932°N 81.8214°W

Information
- Type: Public
- Established: c. 1897
- Closed: 1969 (Original)
- School district: Polk County Public Schools
- Communities served: Bartow, Florida
- Website: https://unionacademy.polkschoolsfl.com/

Union Academy is a magnet middle school in Bartow, Florida. It dates to 1897 when it opened as an elementary school for African Americans. It was expanded to include a high school in 1923. The high school was merged into Summerlin Institute in 1969 following the desegregation era and its students became part of Bartow High School on the Summerlin campus. Union Academy became a Middle School.

Union Academy has a dress code and follows the International Baccelaureate (I.B.) program. It is at 1795 East Wabash Street.

== History ==
Union Academy was founded for the education of African Americans and named for the Union Academy, the fourth school founded in Florida for African Americans by the Freedmens Bureau in Gainesville. A.N. Ritchie was the school's first principal. The school was underfunded and only went to the 8th grade.

A secondary education program added in 1923 to make it a high school. The old school was demolished and a new high school built on East Wabash Street in 1929. James E. Stephens became a teacher at the school in 1937 and became principal the following year, a position he kept for more than three decades.

Desegregation of the schools was a multi-year process. In 1965, Polk County adopted a plan that allowed students some choice of where to attend. While no white students chose to attend formerly negro schools, many black students used this opportunity to attend previously all-white schools. 55 Union academy students chose to attend Mulberry, and 22 chose to go to Bartow Senior High. Union Academy merged with Summerlin Academy in 1969 and its students joined the white students on the Summerlin campus at what became known as Bartow High School. Ninth graders from both Summerlin and Union were moved to Bartow Jr. High while all 10-12 grade students were sent to Bartow Senior High School. The Union Academy campus became a middle school. In 1991 it was proposed that Union become an elementary school, but after complaints from the black community, it was instead decided to make it a magnet middle school. Bartow Middle School became the only middle school, and Union became a magnet in the fall of 1992.

In 2010 the I.B. program was adopted.

== Athletics ==
Union Academy's teams were known as the Tigers. In 1957, coached by Forrest McKennie, Union won the FIAA basketball state championship with a 23-0 record. McKennie also coached Union to state championships in football in 1954, 1958, 1960, and 1963, including a perfect record in 1954. McKennie was inducted into the Polk County Sports Hall of Fame in 2019. The school also won the FIAA track title in 1967 and the FHSAA class B state championship in 1969.

Several graduates went on to star at FAMU and several played in the NFL.

== Notable people ==
- Andrew McCutchen, American baseball player for the Pittsburgh Pirates of Major League Baseball
- Jim Battle, American football player for the Minnesota Vikings and Arizona Cardinals of the NFL
- Herbert Dixon, golfer, member of African American Golfers Hall of Fame as well as the National Black Golf Hall of Fame
- Leroy Hardee, running back drafted by the Green Bay Packers from FAMU
- Major Hazelton, American NFL football player and cornerback who set FAMU's single season record for interceptions with 17 despite being known as an aggressive.run stopped who played like a linebacker
- Nat James, American NFL football player
- Alton Lavan, American football player
- Ken Riley, American football cornerback for the Cincinnati Bengals.
- Sam Silas, American football player for the Arizona Cardinals, New York Giants, and San Francisco 49ers.
- Jerry Simmons, American football player for the Pittsburgh Steelers, Chicago Bears, and several other NFL teams.
- Don Smith, offensive lineman for the Denver Broncos
