= Auburndale High School =

Location
- 1 Bloodhound Trail; Auburndale, Florida 33823; United States; 28°4′26″N 81°47′14″W

Information
- Type: Public
- Established: 1925, 1954 (at current location)
- School district: Polk County School District
- Principal: Todd Bennett
- Teaching staff: 78.00 (FTE)
- Grades: 9 to 12
- Enrollment: 1,777 (2023-2024)
- Student to teacher ratio: 22.78
- Campus size: 90 acres (36 ha)
- Campus type: Urban
- Colors: Blue and Gold
- Slogan: "Creating an extraordinary environment that inspires greatness"
- Athletics conference: Class 6A, District 12
- Mascot: Bloodhounds
- Nickname: Hounds
- Website: https://auburndalehigh.polkschoolsfl.com/

Auburndale High School is a four-year public high school located in Auburndale, Florida, United States, and a part of Polk County Public Schools. The school serves about 1,800 students from ninth through twelfth grades. In 2012, construction was completed on a new media center, added parking, centrally located cafeteria, and new academic buildings.

== History ==
Auburndale's first official school opened in 1890 in a building on the corner of Main Street and Bridgers Avenue. Education for grades one through eight was offered, and less than 40 students were enrolled in the school. By 1895 the city had the southernmost library and free reading room in the United States, adding culture to the city.

The first building officially constructed as a classroom was built in 1915 on the site that is now Stambaugh Middle School. A second building, built in 1925, included the addition of an auditorium that was used by the city for cultural events until 1979. All Auburndale students in grades one through twelve attended this school until 1947 when Auburndale Central Elementary opened and took the youngest students. In 1954, the school became a junior high school as students in grades nine through twelve moved to the present-day site of Auburndale High School. In 1972, Auburndale Junior High moved and opened just north of the high school and remained until 1984 when Stambaugh Middle School opened. The Auburndale Junior High (North Campus) building was added to the high school campus in the start of the 1989–1990 school year; AHS has been a 9-12 center since.

== Academics and students ==
The school operates on a mixed block schedule with three days per week of a 7 period day, and two days with block scheduling. Graduations are held on the football field on campus yearly.

Auburndale High School offers several Advanced Placement courses, such as World History, American History, American Government and Politics, Language and Composition, Literature and Composition, Capstone Seminar, Capstone Research, Calculus AB, Pre-calculus, Statistics, Spanish Language and Culture, Spanish Literature and Culture, Biology, Environmental Science, Chemistry, Photography, and 3D Art and Design.

Auburndale has partnered with nearby Polk State College and Southeastern University to offer several Dual enrollment courses on campus.

== Notable alumni ==
- Bobby Braddock - songwriter/producer
- Aubrey Burks - college football safety for the West Virginia Mountaineers
- Chauncey Davis - professional football player
- Les Dudek - guitarist with the Allman Brothers Band
- Van Green - NFL player
- Hesham Ismail - professional football player
- Derwin James- professional football player (attended but did not graduate)
- Glenn Martinez - professional football player
- Tracy McGrady - professional basketball player (1997) (attended but did not graduate)
- Pascal Millien - professional soccer player
- Monae' Nichols - professional track & field athlete
- Kyle Ryan - professional baseball player (2010)
- Manisha Singh, attorney and Assistant Secretary of State for Economic and Business Affairs
