= Rochelle School of the Arts =

Art magnet school in Lakeland, Florida

Location
- 1501 N. Martin L. King Avenue; Lakeland, Polk County, Florida; United States
- Coordinates: 28.064277°N 81.960558°W

Information
- School district: 12
- Principal: Mrs. Maude Frazier
- Grades: K–8
- Colors: Purple and Teal (elementary), gray and black (middle school)
- Athletics: Basketball (girls and boys), Volleyball, Track and field
- Mascot: Panthers
- Nickname: RSA
- FSA average: 3-5
- Newspaper: Panther press
- Middle School Guidance Counselor: Mrs. Denise Willoughby
- Elementary Guidance Counselor: Ms. Sue Wallace
- Guidance Secretary: Mrs. Jackie McAllister
- Website: rochellesota.polkschoolsfl.com

Rochelle School of the Arts (RSA) is a K–8 magnet school in Lakeland, Florida that has a specific focus on art-related subjects. It offers a variety of classes, such as Art, Band, Dance, Orchestra, Theatre, and Vocal. Rochelle has many different other classes that students can participate in such as keyboard, creative writing, photography, television production, robotics, theatre tech, musical theatre, art, women's choir, men's choir, Treble Choir, Show Choir, Physical Education and handbells. There are many clubs at Rochelle that do not have a class such as, Rocketry Club, Chess Club, Junior Thespians, Ukulele, SSYRA club, National Junior Honor Society, P.E.A.R.L.S, Math Counts, Golf Club, Recycling Squad, and Robotics.

== History ==
Before the 14th Amendment was established, Rochelle School of the Arts was a segregated black school. After the local black school was burned to the ground for the second time in the 1920s, Washington Park School was founded in 1924, and served black students up to grade 8. In 1927 it became only the sixth black high school in the state of Florida when it added 10th grade, and in 1930 Washington Park High School graduated its first class of 10 students. In 1949, the school was renamed Rochelle High School for noted black Polk County educator William A. Rochelle. William A. Rochelle migrated to Lakeland and made a mark in the field of education. In 1949, a new Rochelle High School was built three blocks away, and the old Washington Park location became Rochelle Junior High. When segregation ended, Rochelle was closed down, but later reopened then turned into an art school.

When Rochelle School of the Arts opened in 1992 as a K–8 Performing Arts school, it was the first of its kind in the State of Florida, and the second of its kind in the country. It had been a model for the various other performing arts elementary and middle schools in the state that have followed.

The school has very diverse students and teachers. The students at Rochelle have high expectations from the teachers and staff. They were an "A" school formerly, but changed when the new principals arrived in the 2012–13 school year. They were now a "B" school. They would have been a "C" school but due to complications with the "FCAT" the grade was raised to "B" their goal was to get it back up to an "A" during the 2013–14 school year.

Rochelle School of the Arts has 8 periods a day and it works very well with their arts classes. If it were to change to blocked schedule (7 periods) the arts program would not work well. Eight periods a day gives the students a more well-rounded experience in the arts and academics. If it was a blocked schedule the students would have to stay in the class much longer and have less of a well-rounded experience in the arts because they would have only one art for each teacher. The teachers will also get to learn about what the students need to learn with an 8-period-per-day schedule.

During the 2013–14 year, Rochelle's Administration and Polk County School Board approved renovations and landscaping. They renovated many things such as the office and auditorium.

== Extras and electives at Rochelle School of the Arts ==
The National Junior Honor Society (NJHS) at Rochelle School of the Arts has participated in many of the fundraisers and raised about $12,000 towards many of these fundraisers. They also sent many items to the "Operation Christmas Child" to help relieve children in underprivileged countries.

The 2013–14 Robotics Team at Rochelle School of the Arts attended the Robotics Conference in Toronto, Canada. In that same year, the Girls Basketball team went undefeated.

Every year at Rochelle, the 8th grade classes has an "Eighth Grade Talent" show which is open to parents and students.

== Notable people ==
- Clarence Childs, professional football player
- Joe Sweet, professional football player
