= Sam Silas =

American football player (1940–2023)

No. 72, 78
- Position: Defensive end

Personal information
- Born: September 25, 1940; Bartow, Florida, U.S.
- Died: December 17, 2023 (aged 83); Lakeland, Florida, U.S.

Career information
- College: Southern Illinois
- AFL draft: 1963: 6th round, 46 (By the Boston Patriots)th overall pick

Career history
- 1963–1967: St. Louis Cardinals
- 1968: New York Giants
- 1969–1970: San Francisco 49ers

Awards and highlights
- Pro Bowl (1965)
- Stats at Pro Football Reference

Samuel Louis Silas (September 25, 1940 – December 17, 2023) was an American professional football player who was a defensive lineman in the National Football League (NFL). He was selected by the Boston Patriots in the sixth round (46th overall) of the 1963 AFL draft. He played for the St. Louis Cardinals from 1963 to 1967, for the New York Giants in 1968, and for the San Francisco 49ers from 1969 to 1970. He went to one Pro Bowl during his eight-year career, and was selected to one All-Pro team. Silas played for the Portland Storm of the World Football League in 1974.
