= Ken Riley =

American football player (1947–2020)

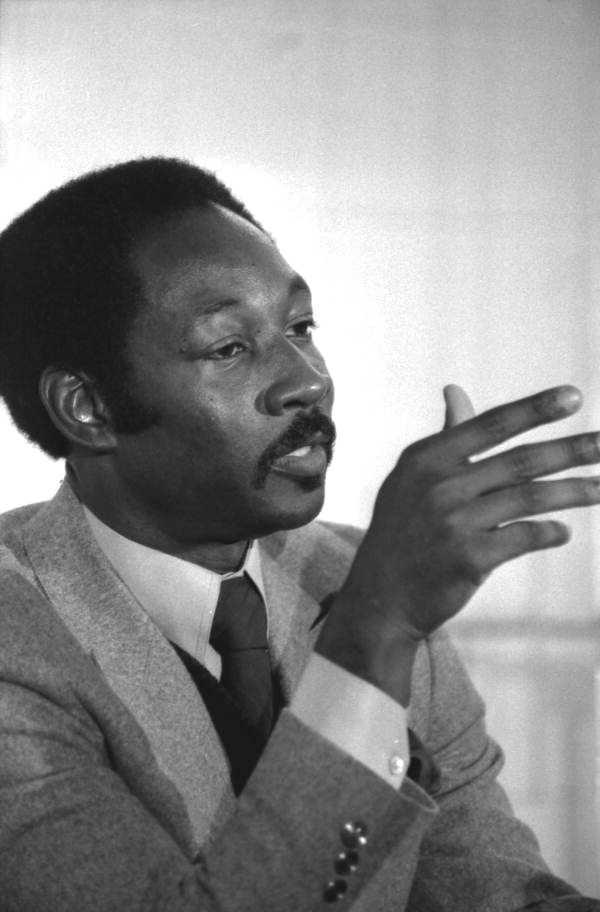
- Riley as the coach of Florida A&M in 1986

No. 13
- Position: Cornerback

Personal information
- Born: August 6, 1947; Bartow, Florida, U.S.
- Died: June 7, 2020 (aged 72); Bartow, Florida, U.S.
- Listed height: 5 ft 11 in (1.80 m)
- Listed weight: 181 lb (82 kg)

Career information
- High school: Union (Bartow)
- College: Florida A&M
- NFL draft: 1969: 6th round, 135th overall pick

Career history

Playing
- Cincinnati Bengals (1969–1983)

Coaching
- Green Bay Packers (1984–1985) Defensive backs coach; Florida A&M (1986–1993) Head coach

Operations
- Florida A&M (1994–2003) Athletic director

Awards and highlights
- As a player: First-team All-Pro (1983); 2× Second-team All-Pro (1975, 1976); Cincinnati Bengals Ring of Honor; Cincinnati Bengals 40th Anniversary Team; Cincinnati Bengals 50th Anniversary Team; As a coach: 2× MEAC Coach of the Year (1988, 1990)

Career NFL statistics
- Interceptions: 65
- Interception yards: 596
- Fumble recoveries: 18
- Sacks: 1
- Defensive touchdowns: 5
- Stats at Pro Football Reference

Head coaching record
- Career: 45–40–2 (.529)
- Pro Football Hall of Fame

Kenneth Jerome Riley (August 6, 1947 – June 7, 2020) was an American professional football player who spent his entire career as a cornerback for the Cincinnati Bengals, first in the American Football League (AFL) in 1969 and then the National Football League (NFL) from 1970 through 1983. Riley recorded 65 interceptions in his career, which was the fourth most in NFL history at the time of his retirement. Despite his accomplishments, he was never an exceptionally well-known or popular player. Riley was never once selected to play in the AFL All-Star Game or the Pro Bowl, but he was selected to three All-Pro teams. His teammate, eight-time Pro Bowler Leapin' Lemar Parrish, was considered the better cornerback. In 2023, four decades after Riley's career ended, Riley was posthumously elected to the Pro Football Hall of Fame.

== Early life ==
Kenneth Jerome Riley was born on August 6, 1947, in Bartow, Florida and grew up there. Forrest McKennie was his high school coach at Union Academy.

== College career ==
Before his professional career, Riley played quarterback for Florida A&M University. Under coach Jake Gaither, Riley led the Rattlers to a 23–7 record and three Southern Intercollegiate Athletic Conference titles. In addition to being a skilled athlete, Riley also excelled academically. He earned his team's scholastic award and a Rhodes Scholar candidacy. In 1982, Riley was enshrined in Florida A&M's Athletic Hall of Fame.

Riley pledged the Beta Nu chapter of Alpha Phi Alpha fraternity at Florida A&M University during undergraduate. After graduation, Riley also earned a Master's degree from the University of South Florida and occasionally worked as a substitute high school teacher during his NFL off-seasons.

== Professional career ==
After graduating from college, Riley was selected 135th overall by the Bengals in the sixth round of the 1969 Common Draft. When Riley reported to training camp, Cincinnati head coach Paul Brown decided to convert Riley to the cornerback position, as the team had selected quarterback Greg Cook with the 5th pick of the draft and he was expected to be their quarterback of the future. Riley started his career with Cincinnati in its second and last year in the American Football League. Riley was used for kick returns as well as a defensive back. He made his first interception in his fifth game, doing so against the Denver Broncos off Pete Liske (throwing his only pass). He would have four interceptions in the closing five games for the Bengals. In nine starts, Riley had four interceptions while returning 14 kicks for 334 yards with two receptions for 15 yards.

For 1970, Riley did not have an interception in his first 11 games. However, he broke the drought against San Diego and had four interceptions in the last three games of the year, including his first two-interception game in the season finale against the Boston Patriots in a 45–7 win. The Bengals made the playoffs that year, but Riley did not record a statistic in the loss.

In 1971, Riley had five interceptions, which included two interceptions each against Houston and San Diego. For 1972, he had a pick in the opening game against the Patriots before going eight games without another one until facing Chicago. For his part, he had three interceptions.

Riley had two interceptions in 1973. In his first five seasons, he had eighteen total interceptions. He would follow this up with 25 combined in his next five seasons. He started by having five interceptions in 1974, which included his first three-game streak of interceptions since 1971, doing so against Baltimore, Pittsburgh, and Houston.

He improved further in 1975, rising to six interceptions that included one each in five consecutive games. In the game against Atlanta, he returned an interception for a touchdown, his first as a player. In the playoff game that year, Riley recorded an interception off Ken Stabler, but the Bengals lost to the Oakland Raiders 31–28. Riley did not garner a Pro Bowl selection, but he was given some press within All-Pro votes, as Associated Press and the Sporting News named him first-team All-Conference. UPI, AP, and Pro Football Writers named him second-team.

In 1976, he recorded a career high in interceptions, picking off nine passes while returning one for a score with two fumble recoveries. He had his highlight game in the season finale against New York on December 12, recording three interceptions as the Bengals rampaged Joe Namath (playing his last game as a Jet) and Richard Todd in a 42–3 win. For his part, the Associated Press and Pro Football Writers named him to the All-Conference team on the first-team selections while AP and PFW named him second-team All-Pro. But despite his success in the 1976 season, Riley was not selected to play in the Pro Bowl. Meanwhile, his defensive back teammate Lemar Parrish, who recorded just 2 interceptions, was a Pro Bowl selection.

Although Riley played each game of the 1977 season, he had just two interceptions. An increased schedule in 1978 led to just three interceptions, and the next year led to just one. He moved to three with 1980, but the 1981 season proved a rejuvenation. He recovered a fumble and had five interceptions that year, including four in a three-game span while Cincinnati made a playoff run that year. Riley recorded his one interception in the 28–21 win against the Buffalo Bills off Joe Ferguson.

For 1982, the strike-shortened season did not stop Riley. He had five interceptions that year, with the highlight being against the Los Angeles Raiders, where he recorded three interceptions off Jim Plunkett. He took one of them back for a touchdown to help levy the Bengals to a 31–17 win; it was the only game the Raiders lost in the regular season. In the playoff game against the New York Jets, Riley recorded an interception off Richard Todd, but the Jets rolled to a 44–17 win. This was the seventh and last playoff game for Riley.

It was only in his last season that he received lasting attention as at the age of 36 he was named a first-team All-Pro. He did so with eight interceptions in 14 games, and he led the league with returning two of them for touchdowns with two fumble recoveries and 89 return yards. In his final game against the Minnesota Vikings, he recorded two interceptions off Wade Wilson. It was the fourth time that Riley finished in the top ten for interceptions by an NFL player, with Riley finishing 2nd. At the time of his retirement, Riley was fourth all-time in interceptions with 65.

In his 15 seasons in the NFL, Riley recorded a total of 65 interceptions, 596 return yards, 5 touchdowns, 18 fumble recoveries, 96 fumble return yards, 334 kickoff return yards, and 15 receiving yards. His interceptions, interception return yards, and interceptions returned for touchdowns are all Bengals' records. His 18 defensive fumble recoveries are ranked second in Bengals history. He played in seven postseason games with Cincinnati, recording an interception in three of them. Riley is one of only 26 players in the cornerback position to have played 200 games in the NFL, with Riley ranking 16th.

Since his retirement in 1983, only one NFL player, Rod Woodson, has recorded more interceptions than Riley.

== Later life ==
After his playing career ended, Riley spent two years as an assistant coach for the Green Bay Packers. In 1986, he took over as the head coach of his alma mater, Florida A&M. Riley coached Florida A&M from 1986 to 1993, compiling a 48–39–2 record, with two Mid-Eastern Athletic Conference titles and 2 MEAC Coach of the Year awards. Riley then served as Florida A&M's athletic director from 1994 to 2003, helping the school's athletic programs reach unprecedented levels of profit. He then retired and lived the rest of his life in his hometown of Bartow, Florida. Riley died of a heart attack on June 7, 2020, at the age of 72.

== Legacy ==
Commenting about not yet being enshrined in the Pro Football Hall of Fame, Riley said "I think my numbers are deserving of the Hall of Fame. I've always been a modest and low-key type guy. I've always thought your work would speak for you. It's like it's working against me now because the older you get and the longer you stay out of it, people forget who you are."

In 2007, he was named to the Florida High School Association All-Century Team which selected the Top 33 players in the 100-year history of high school football in the state of Florida's history.

In 2010, he was named as a part of the Pro Football Researchers Association "Hall of Very Good" class of 2010.

Riley was posthumously inducted to the Bengals Ring of Honor as a part of their inaugural class.

On August 17, 2022, Riley was announced as one of the three finalists nominated by the senior committee for induction in the 2023 Pro Football Hall of Fame class along with Joe Klecko and Chuck Howley. At the 2023 NFL Honors, he was announced as a member of the 2023 Hall of Fame class, becoming the second player who spent all of his career with the Bengals to be inducted and the fourth overall.

Riley's teammate, cornerback Lemar Parrish, made six Pro Bowls while playing opposite of Riley. At the time of his retirement, Parrish was tied for 15th all-time in interceptions, for which he has been passed over by dozens of players in the years since retirement. In 1997, The Cincinnati Enquirer said that Parrish hurt his chances for more interceptions by "covering receivers so tightly that quarterbacks didn't even try." Teams were known to throw to Riley's side instead of Parrish's. In 1974, Riley himself even said "They keep on throwin' over here, and I get my six or seven interceptions a year."

== Head coaching record ==
Year	Team	Overall	Conference	Standing	Bowl/playoffs	NCAA^{#}
Florida A&M Rattlers (NCAA Division I-AA independent) (1986)
1986	Florida A&M	5–6				
Florida A&M Rattlers (Mid-Eastern Athletic Conference) (1987–1993)
1987	Florida A&M	5–5–1	0–0	NA		
1988	Florida A&M	6–4–1	4–2	T–1st		18
1989	Florida A&M	6–5	3–3	T–3rd		
1990	Florida A&M	7–4	6–0	1st		
1991	Florida A&M	5–5	3–3	T–3rd		
1992	Florida A&M	7–5	4–2	T–2nd	L Heritage	15
1993	Florida A&M	5–6	3–3	T–3rd		
Florida A&M:		46–40–2	23–13			
Total:		46–40–2				
National championship Conference title Conference division title or championship game berth

== See also ==
- List of NFL career interceptions leaders
- List of American Football League players

== Sources ==
- Ludwig, Chick. Cincinnati Bengals, The Legends. Willmington, OH: Orange Frazer P, 2004. ISBN 1-882203-38-0 page 42.(1)
