= List of people from Bartow, Florida =

The following is a list of notable people who were born in, lived in or are associated with the city of Bartow, Florida.

== Entertainment ==
- Jaime Faith Edmondson, Playboy Playmate, born in Bartow
- Matt West, born in Bartow

== Government and politics ==
- Charles O. Andrews, U.S. senator 1938–1946; attended the South Florida Military Institute in Bartow
- Frank Clark, former Bartow city attorney, U.S. representative for the 2nd District 1905–1925
- Stephen H. Grimes, former Florida Supreme Court chief justice
- Katherine Harris, former U.S. congressman, Florida 13th District; Florida's secretary of state during the controversial Florida recount of 2000
- Spessard Holland, 28th Florida governor and U.S. senator; author of the 24th amendment to the Constitution of the United States
- Jack Latvala, member of Florida Senate, candidate for governor, 2018
- Adam Putnam, former U.S. congressman, Florida secretary of agriculture and candidate for governor, 2018, CEO of Ducks Unlimited
- Jacob Summerlin, the "King of the Crackers", first baby born in Florida after it was ceded from Spain to the United States; founder of both Bartow and Orlando

== Military ==
- Albert H. Blanding, general
- J. Adrian Jackson, rear admiral, U.S. Navy
- Evander McIvor Law, Confederate general during American Civil War
- James Van Fleet, general during the Korean War

== Sports ==
- Johnny Burnett, MLB player for the Cleveland Indians and St. Louis Browns 1927–1935
- Darryl Carlton, NFL player (Tampa Bay Buccaneers), born in Bartow
- Desmond Clark, NFL player (Denver Broncos, Miami Dolphins, Chicago Bears), born in Bartow
- Marcus Floyd, NFL player, New York Jets, Buffalo Bills and Carolina Panthers, born in Bartow
- Kenneth Gant, born in Bartow
- Adarius Glanton, NFL player
- Torrian Gray, NFL player (Minnesota Vikings), born in Bartow
- Alonzo Highsmith, NFL player, born in Bartow
- Ray Lewis, NFL linebacker (Baltimore Ravens), born in Bartow
- Tracy McGrady, NBA player (Atlanta Hawks), born in Bartow
- Jason Odom, former NFL player for the Tampa Bay Buccaneers 1996–1999; graduated from Bartow High School
- Ken Riley, born in Bartow; former Pro Football Hall of Fame cornerback with the Cincinnati Bengals
- James Roberson, NFL football player, born in Bartow
- Sam Silas, NFL football player for the St. Louis Cardinals, New York Giants and San Francisco 49ers 1964–1970, born in Homeland in 1940, graduated from Union Academy
- Jerry Simmons, NFL offensive tackle 1965–1974; graduated from Union Academy
- Theron Smith, NBA player (Charlotte Bobcats), born in Bartow
- James "Bubba" Stewart, born in Bartow; the world's foremost Supercrosser
- Adarius Taylor, NFL linebacker, born in Bartow
- Keydrick Vincent, NFL player (Baltimore Ravens), born in Bartow
- Rick Wilson, NASCAR driver

== Other ==
- Robert McGrady Blackburn, Methodist bishop
- Armando Gutierrez, banker, owner of WQXM, spokesman for family of Elian Gonzalez
- Marshall Ledbetter, photographer, psychedelics enthusiast, iconoclast and unconventional protester, born in Bartow
- Nelson Serrano, infamous murderer
- Charlie Smith, centenarian, claimed to be the oldest person in American history (137)
- Ossian Sweet, Detroit physician best known for the Sweet Trials, defended by Clarence Darrow; born and raised in Bartow
- Michael Tomasello, developmental psychologist and anthropologist, National Academy of Sciences
