= Adrian Jackson =

Adrian Jackson may refer to:

- Adrian Jackson (musician) (born 1970), former bassist for the band My Dying Bride
- Adrian Jackson (theatre director), founder-director of the theatre company, Cardboard Citizens in the UK
- Adrian Jackson (orienteer), Australian mountain bike orienteering competitor and World Champion
- J. Adrian Jackson, rear admiral in the U.S. Navy
- Adrian Township, Jackson County, Kansas
