= Armando Gutierrez =

American banker and political consultant

Armando Gutierrez (born November 17, 1949) is a Cuban-American banker, political consultant, and entrepreneur.

== Background ==
Gutierrez was born in Cuba, then moved to the United States, where he spent several years in New Jersey and eventually settled in Miami, Florida. He spent several years in the banking industry, serving as senior vice-president of the Central Bank and Trust Company.

He has been director of the Latin Chamber of Commerce and a delegate of the Cuban Patriotic Junta. He also served as chairman of South Floridians for the Statue of Liberty, a fundraising group that supported the statue's 100th anniversary restoration campaign. Gutierrez was a member of the Diversity Action Council, an organization created and funded by Miami-based Burger King to promote and support diversity among its franchisees.

== Elián González ==
He acted as spokesperson for the family of Elián González during the Elián González affair. Gutierrez supported the efforts in Miami to prevent Elián from being sent to live with his father in Cuba. Gutierrez organized the legal team and negotiated with the US government. The night of the entry to retrieve Elián Gonzalez, Gutierrez and attorneys were in the house speaking to the Clinton administration.

== Personal life ==
Gutierrez is owner of several businesses including consulting companies and a utility company. In May 2009, Gutierrez sold his 50% interest in WQXM, an AM radio station in Bartow, Florida. Gutierrez is the father of Armando Gutierrez the producer and actor.
