= Polk County History Center =

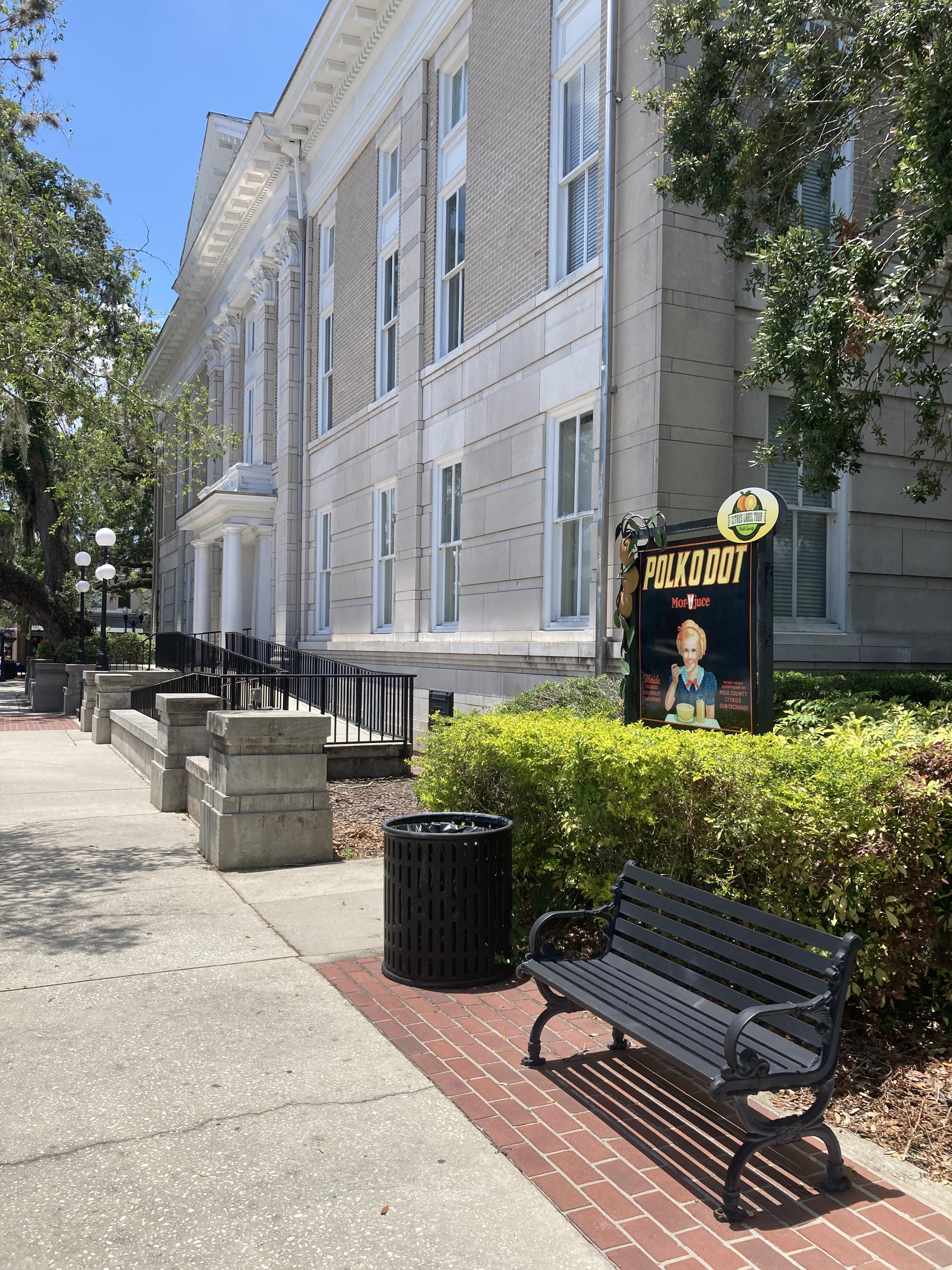
- Side entrance to the Polk County History Center

- Location within Florida
- Established: September 19, 1998
- Location: 100 East Main Street; Bartow, Florida
- Coordinates: 27.89667°N 81.84306°W
- Type: History
- Website: www.polkhistorycenter.org

The Polk County History Center is located at 100 East Main Street, Bartow, Florida, in the historic Old Polk County Courthouse. The museum consists of exhibits presenting local and regional history from pre-Columbian to present eras and a library with items pertaining to the history and genealogy of the eastern United States.

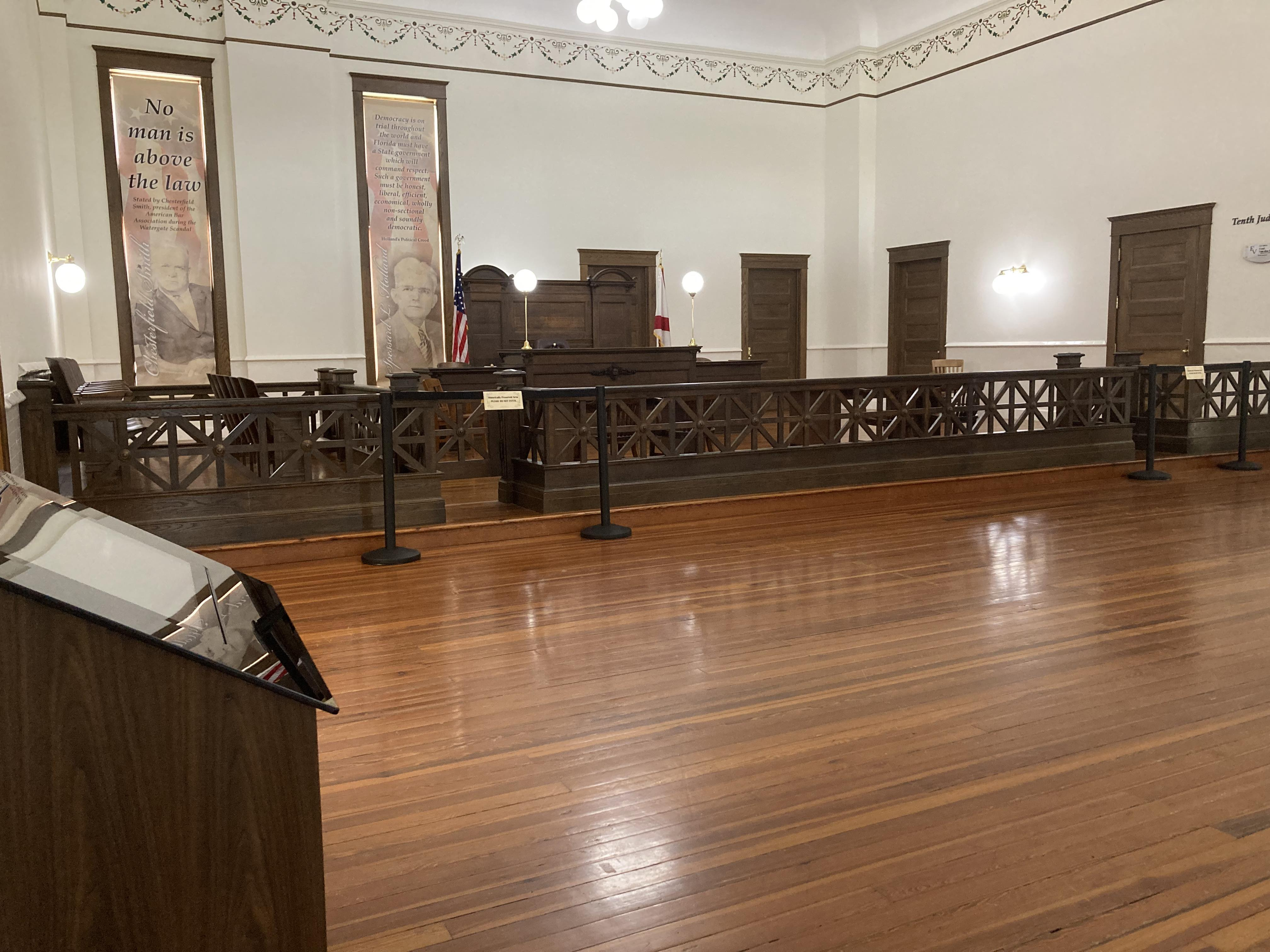
Old Polk County Courthouse at the Polk County History Center

A research project to use Historic Building Information Modeling (HBIM) technology to digitally preserve and reconstruct the OPCC building was conducted to archive the courthouse for preservation, operations, and maintenance.

== Historical and Genealogical Library ==
The Polk County Historical and Genealogical Library was established in 1937 and opened to the public in 1940. The library was originally located in the office of the county attorney, with its location changing to different locations within the Old Polk County Courthouse. The library was moved out of the courthouse to a new location on Hendry Street in 1974, but moved back to the courthouse in 1987. Over a decade-long renovation, the library came to encompass all three floors of the eastern wing of the courthouse.

The library holds more than 40,000 items in its collection, including books, microfilm, and periodicals related to history and genealogy, including newspapers, photographs, maps, directories, property tax rolls, and cemetery records. Library collections are non-circulatory and cannot be checked out. Visitors have included access to Ancestry.com on library computers, and registered users with FamilySearch have access to over 5 million additional genealogical records. Some library resources have been digitized and are available online through digital collections.

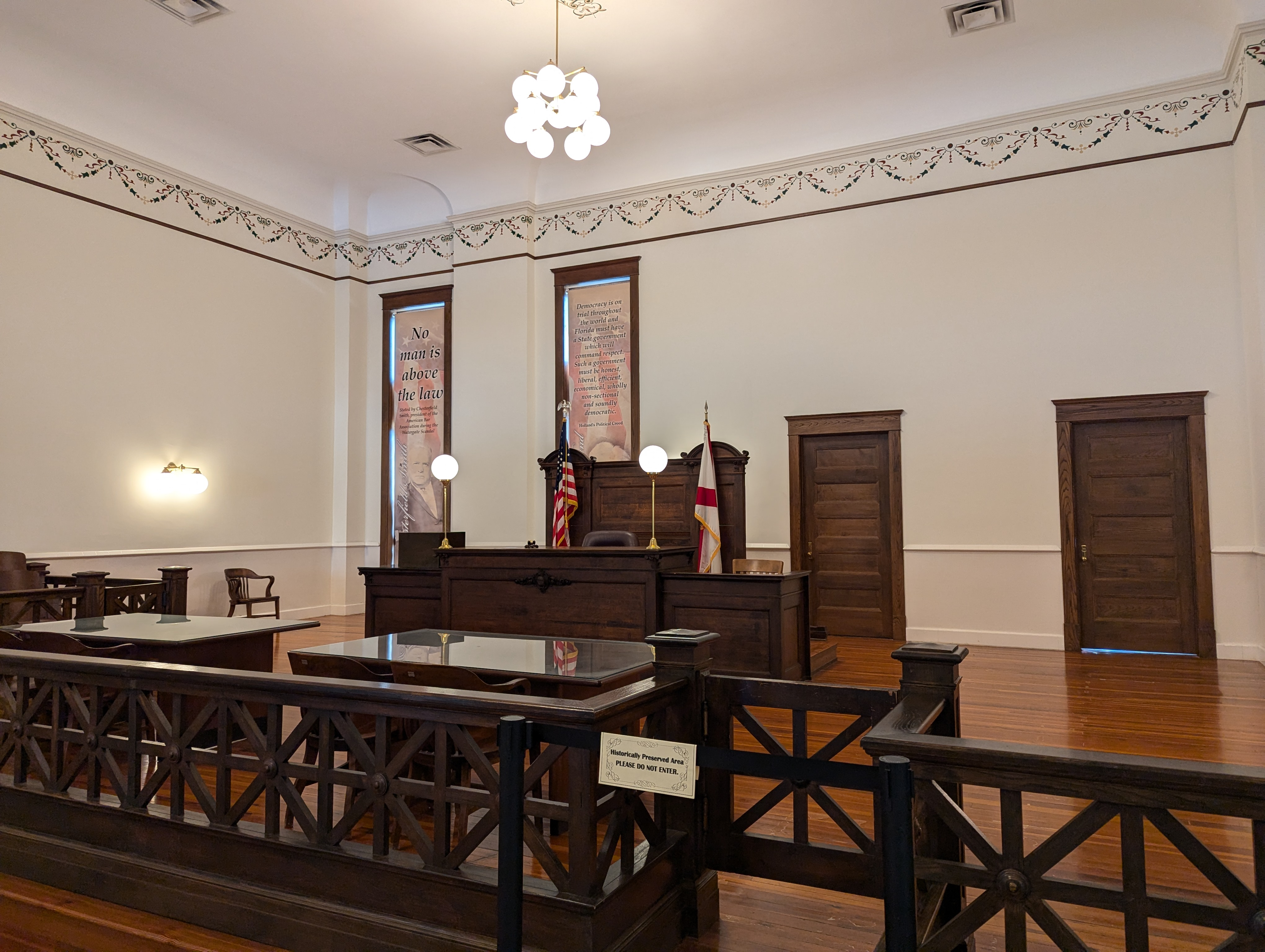
The historically preserved 1908 Polk County courtroom located in the Polk County History Center in Bartow, Florida.
