= WWBF =

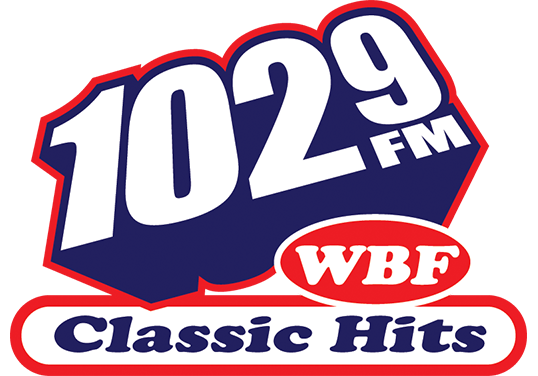
- Bartow, Florida; United States
- Broadcast area: Polk County, Florida
- Frequency: 1130 kHz
- Branding: Classic Hits 102.9 WBF

Programming
- Format: Classic hits
- Affiliations: Westwood One; Fox News Radio

Ownership
- Owner: Thornburg Communications, Inc.

History
- First air date: September 6, 1969
- Former call signs: WPUL (1969–1984)
- Call sign meaning: Wonderful Bartow Florida

Technical information
- Licensing authority: FCC
- Facility ID: 66926
- Class: B
- Power: 2,500 watts (day); 500 watts (night)
- Transmitter coordinates: 27°54′31.00″N 81°49′33.00″W
- Translators: 97.1 W246DX (Winter Haven); 102.9 W275AX (Bartow)

Links
- Public license information: Public file; LMS
- Webcast: Listen live
- Website: wwbf.com

WWBF (1130 AM) is a commercial radio station licensed to Bartow, Florida. As the capital city of Polk County, Bartow is centrally located in the Lakeland and Winter Haven region. WWBF has a classic hits format and is owned and operated locally by Thornburg Communications, Inc.

Programming is also heard on two low-power translators: W275AX (102.9 FM) and W246DX (97.1 FM).

== History ==
WWBF was granted a license by the FCC on September 6, 1969. It has been under the same local ownership and management since 1984. It is on a clear-channel frequency (the only AM on 1130 kHz in the state of Florida is a member of the Florida Association of Broadcasters.

On September 11, 2013, WWBF began simulcasting on FM translator W275AX on frequency 102.9, located in Lakeland.

On November 24, 2021, WWBF began simulcasting on a second FM translator W246DX on frequency 97.1, located in Auburndale.

WWBF is a division of Thornburg Communications, Inc. The station is known in the local market as Classic Hits 102.9 WBF (after its translator frequency).

== Translators ==
Broadcast translators for WWBF
Call sign	Frequency	City of license	FID	ERP (W)	HAAT	Class	Transmitter coordinates	FCC info
W246DX	97.1 FM	Winter Haven, Florida	202882	200	116 m (381 ft)	D	28°05′8.4″N 81°49′16.7″W	LMS
W275AX	102.9 FM	Bartow, Florida	148943	240	121 m (397 ft)	D	27°56′37″N 81°54′43″W	LMS
