= South Bartow Residential District =

Historic district in Florida, United States

- U.S. National Register of Historic Places
- U.S. Historic district
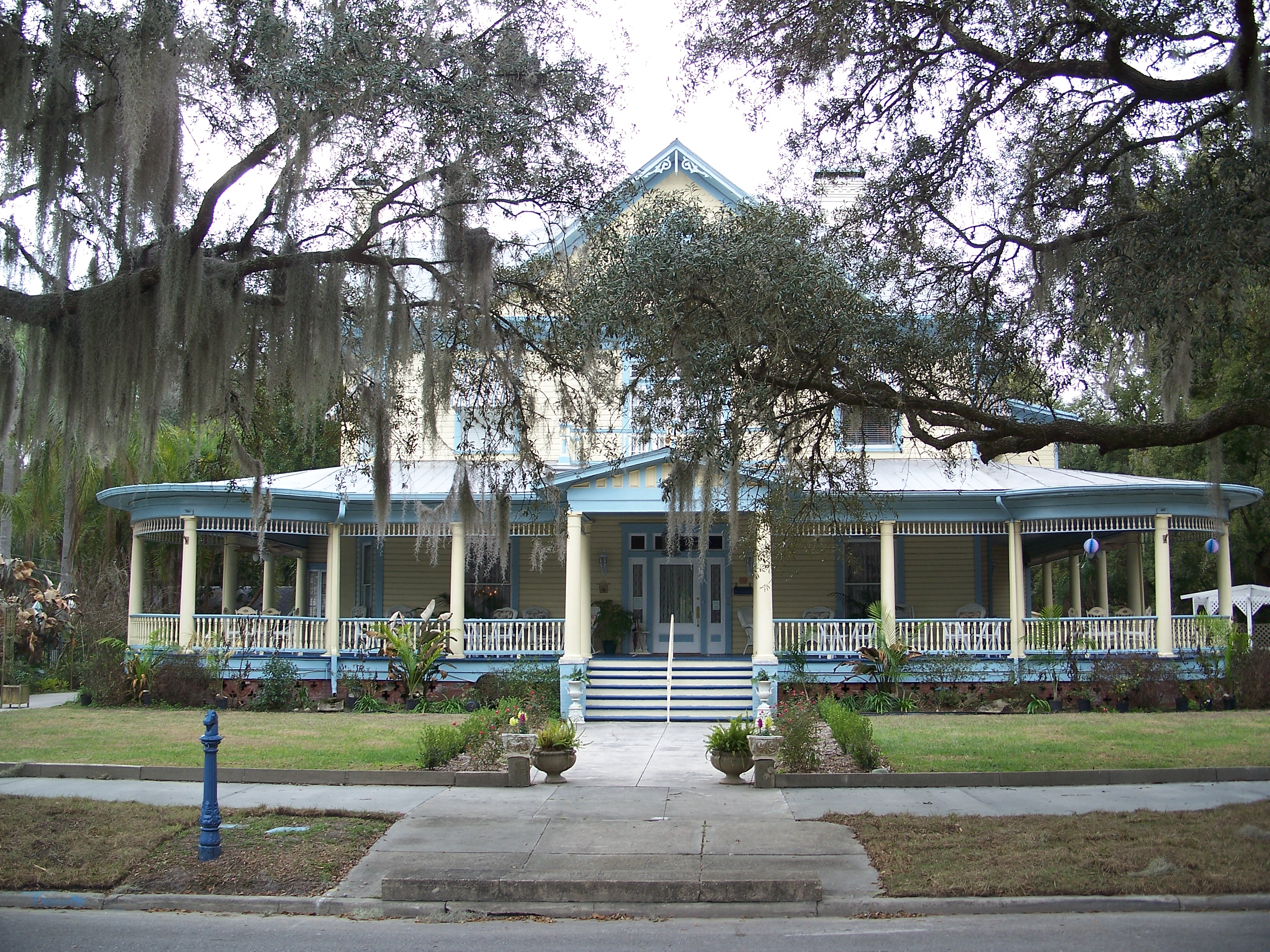

- Location within Florida Location within the United States
- Location: Roughly bounded by Floral and First Aves. and Main and Vine Sts., Bartow, Florida
- Coordinates: 27°53′32″N 81°50′28″W
- Area: 110 acres (45 ha)
- Built: 1885
- Architectural style: Colonial Revival, Bungalow/Craftsman, Vernacular, Wood Frame
- MPS: Bartow MPS
- NRHP reference No.: 93000394
- Added to NRHP: May 18, 1993

The Bartow Downtown Commercial District (also known as the Old Polk County Courthouse) is a historic district in central Bartow, Florida. Composed of an area bounded by Floral and 1st Avenues and Main and Vine Streets, the district includes 204 contributing properties. It was added to the National Register of Historic Places in 1993.
