= Wonderhouse =

House in Bartow, Florida, U.S.

Coordinates: 27°52′28″N 81°50′2″W

The Wonder House, is a private residence in Bartow, Polk County Florida, that offers historic tours by online advance reservation. The Wonder House was built by Conrad Schuck, who was given only 1 year to live by his doctors.

== History and architecture ==
Schuck owned a building and supply company in Pittsburgh, Pennsylvania when in the early 1920s his doctor told him he might have one year to live but only if he moved to a warmer climate. Schuck moved his family to Bartow around 1926 and started building the home with his sons while living across the street. The house was uniquely designed with many features that have been referred to as "Ingenious touches" leading it to also be called "The Crazy House", or "The House of a Thousand Gadgets".

Built in a Cruciform architectural style of rock from the property, concrete, glass, tile, and used train rails. There was a central fireplace that created a draft and pillars were built hollow to trap and allow rainwater to cool the exterior. The fireplace had mirrors at the top and inside that reflected sunlight to a prism that could be situated to reflected different colored lights to the inside. During WWII there were concerns that Schuck might be signaling German planes and he was arrested and jailed for three days. The FBI issued a press release that he was not a German spy but he filled the fireplace with concrete. There were individual balconies on the bedrooms complete with outdoor bathtubs, and a fish pond on the third floor balcony. Mirrors and one way glass were placed to allow seeing the front door from multiple locations even the third floor balcony. The house is decorated with hand carvings and mosaics with a large three stepped irregularly shaped swimming pool in the front yard referred to as a mote. Schuck was convinced to open the mansion to tours and during the depression era until the 1960s he did just that. Finally selling the property around that time it was bought, sold, and lost in foreclosures remaining vacant for many years. Although given a grim outlook on life Schuck lived until 1971.

The property was sold at an auction in 2015. The current owners have been restoring the property and offer guided historic tours by reservation, available via advance online booking. The rebuilding and remodeling was covered by episode 9 of the Netflix show Amazing Interiors.
