= Benjamin Franklin Holland House =

Historic house in Florida, United States

- U.S. National Register of Historic Places
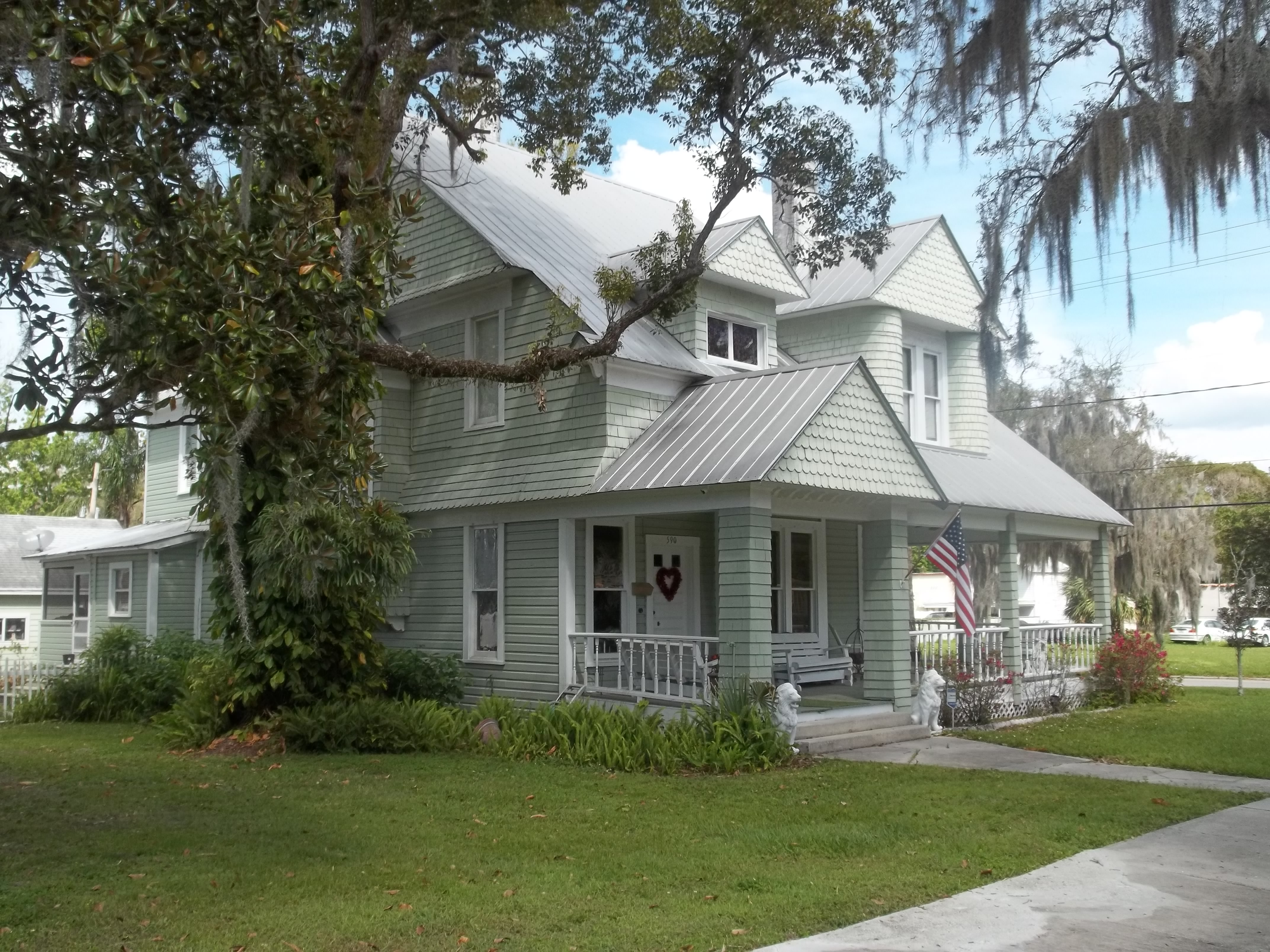

- Location within Florida Location within the United States
- Location: Bartow, Florida, United States
- Coordinates: 27°53′39″N 81°50′23″W
- Built: 1895
- Architect: E. R. Wharton
- Architectural style: Frame Vernacular, Shingle Style
- NRHP reference No.: 75000566
- Added to NRHP: April 3, 1975

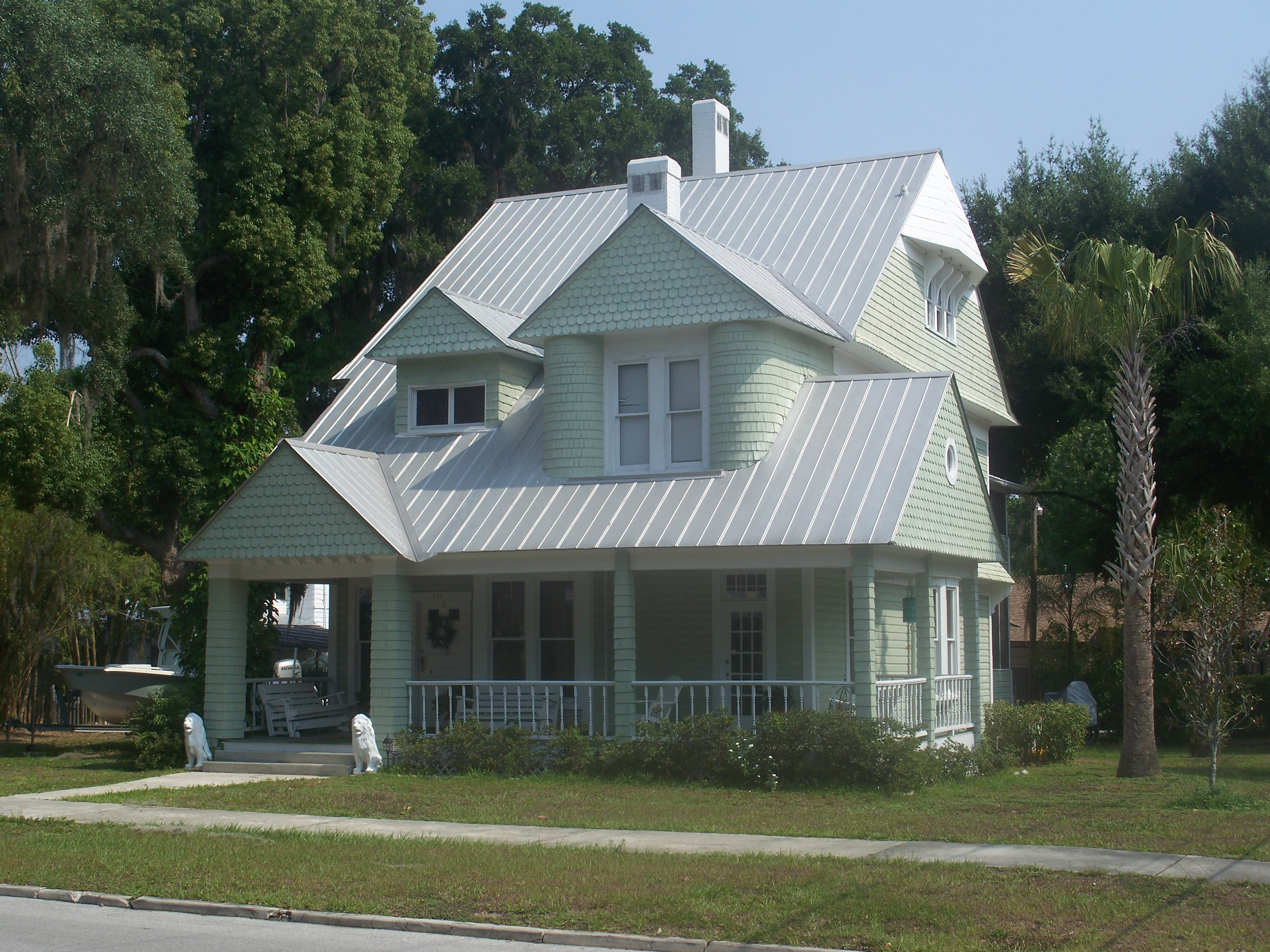

The Benjamin Franklin Holland House (also known as The Gables or Roy Trent Gallemore House) is a historic home in Bartow, Florida. It is located at 590 East Stanford Street. Benjamin Franklin Holland was the father of Spessard Holland, one of Florida's governors as well as a United States senator representing the state. On April 3, 1975, the house was added to the U.S. National Register of Historic Places.
