= Northeast Bartow Residential District =

Historic district in Florida, United States

- U.S. National Register of Historic Places
- U.S. Historic district
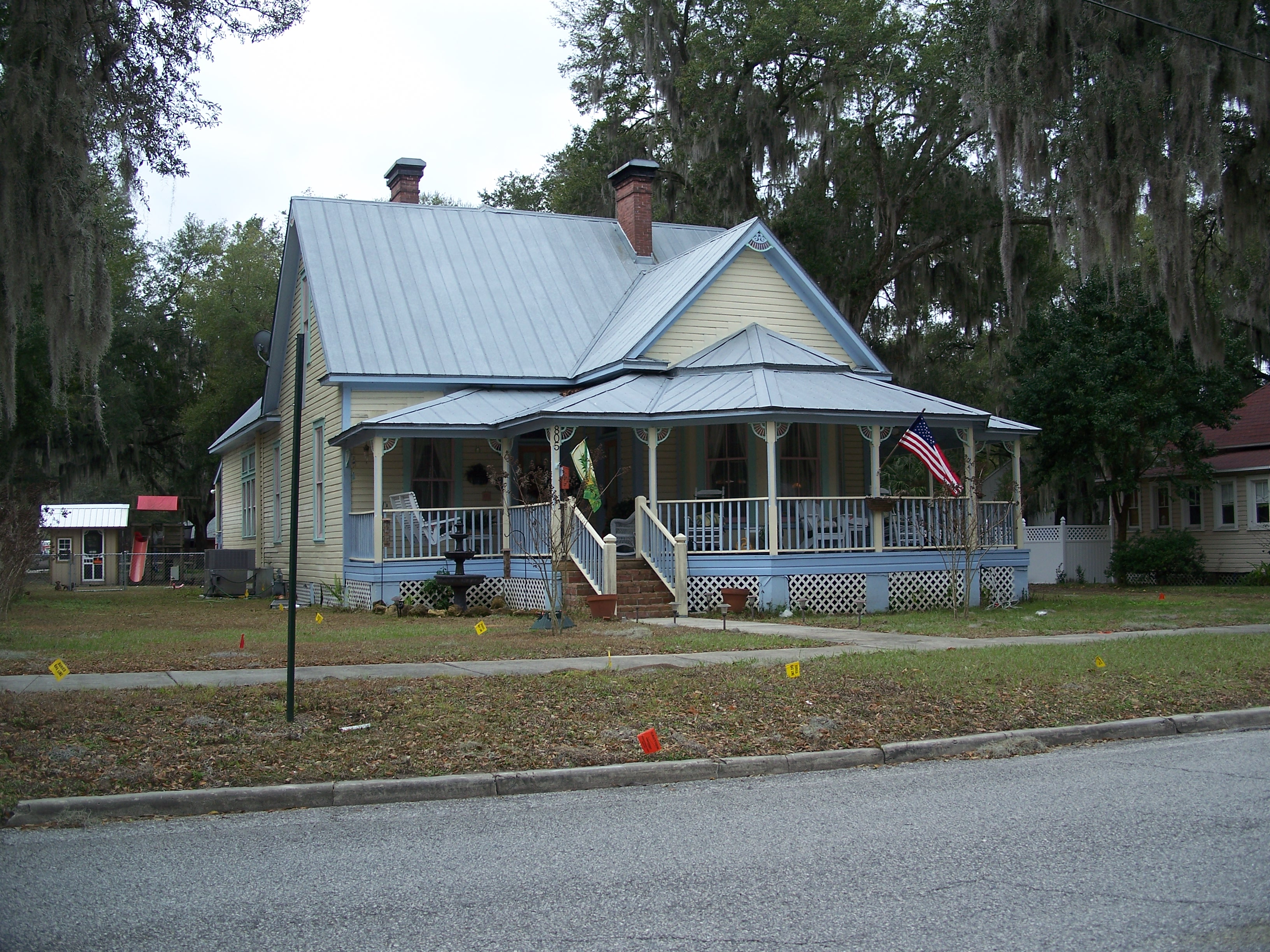
- A house in the district

- Location within Florida Location within the United States
- Location: Roughly bounded by Jackson and First Aves. and by Church and Boulevard Sts., Bartow, Florida
- Coordinates: 27°53′57″N 81°50′15″W
- Area: 16 acres (6.5 ha)
- Built: 1886
- Architectural style: Colonial Revival, Classical Revival, Vernacular, Wood Frame
- MPS: Bartow MPS
- NRHP reference No.: 93000392
- Added to NRHP: May 18, 1993

The Northeast Bartow Residential District is a historic district in Bartow, Florida. Composed of an area bounded by Jackson and 1st Avenues and by Church and Boulevard Streets, the district includes twenty-six contributing properties. It was listed on the National Register of Historic Places in 1993.
