= Robert McGrady Blackburn =

Robert McGrady Blackburn (12 September 1919 – 17 March 2002) was an American bishop of the United Methodist Church, elected in 1972.

== Birth and family ==
Robert was born in Bartow, Florida, the son of the Rev. C. Fred and Effie Frances (Forsythe) Blackburn. His father was the son of a Methodist minister, too. He married Mary Jeanne Everett on 16 November 1943, and they had three children: Jeanne Marie (Mrs. Ramon Cox), Robert McGrady Jr., and Frances Lucile (Mrs. John Harwood). Robert Jr. became the fourth generation of the family to enter Ordained Ministry.

Mary Jeanne died on 22 May 1977 after a long illness. On 9 September 1978, Bishop Blackburn married Jewell Haddock of Jacksonville, whom he had known for several years. After the Bishop's retirement, they moved to Jacksonville.

== Education ==
Blackburn graduated from high school in Orlando, Florida. He earned a B.A. degree from Florida Southern College, Lakeland, Florida, in 1941. He earned a B.D. degree from the Candler School of Theology, Emory University, Atlanta in 1943. He also received honorary degrees from LaGrange College, Florida Southern, North Carolina Wesleyan College, and from Shenandoah College and Conservatory of Music in Winchester, Virginia. In 1973 Florida Southern presented him the school's Distinguished Alumnus Award.

== Ordained ministry ==
Robert was ordained deacon in 1943 by Bishop Arthur James Moore (and ordained Elder in 1944). Rev. Blackburn was appointed to Boca Grande, Florida. Subsequently, he served the following Methodist churches in the Florida Annual Conference: First Church, Orlando (as Associate Pastor); Mount Dora; Trinity, DeLand; First Church, Jacksonville; and again First Church, Orlando (as Senior Pastor). Altogether, he served as a pastor for twenty-nine years, a tenure interrupted only by his service as a U.S. Army Chaplain during World War II, 1944–46.

Rev. Blackburn was very active in conference affairs throughout his pastoral ministry, as well. He was considered an expert on financial matters. He was also elected a delegate to General and Jurisdictional Conferences between 1964 and 1972.

== Episcopal ministry ==
The Southeastern Jurisdictional Conference of the U.M. Church elected Robert M. Blackburn to the episcopacy in 1972. He was assigned to the Raleigh Episcopal Area, where he served for eight years. In 1980 he was assigned to the Richmond Area, where he served until retirement in 1988. During his final year of service (1987–88), under his leadership the Virginia Annual Conference raised $19,400,000 for New Church Development. This was the largest sum ever raised by an Annual Conference in a one-year campaign to that date.

Bishop Blackburn also served on several U.M. General Church Agencies: the General Council on Finance and Administration, the General Board of Higher Education and Ministry, the General Board of Church and Society, and the General Commission on the Status and Role of Women. He also served as a Trustee for more than a half-dozen U.M. institutions of higher education.

Bishop Blackburn also represented the United Methodist Church at the British Methodist Conference in Sheffield, England in 1980. He represented the U.M. Council of Bishops at the European U.M. Conference in Austria in 1984, as well.

== Death and funeral ==
Bishop Blackburn died 17 March 2002 following complications from his 7 March open-heart surgery at Memorial Hospital in Jacksonville, Florida. He was eighty-two years of age. A funeral service was held 19 March 2002 at 4:00 p.m. at the First United Methodist Church, 225 E. Duval St., Jacksonville, FL 32202. In lieu of flowers, memorial donations were received by the church.

== Episcopal remembrance ==
Bishop Joseph Yeakel of Smithsburg, Maryland, remembered Bishop Blackburn as one of the "unsung heroes of the [United Methodist] Church," a leader who was committed to serving his episcopal area. Both men became Bishops in 1972 and forged a bond through that common experience:

"I've always appreciated Bob's integrity...He was strong and a good leader and a friend. He really made his major contributions in the Area, and that's really what we're called to do."

== See also ==
- List of bishops of the United Methodist Church
