= Old Polk County Courthouse (Florida) =

- U.S. National Register of Historic Places
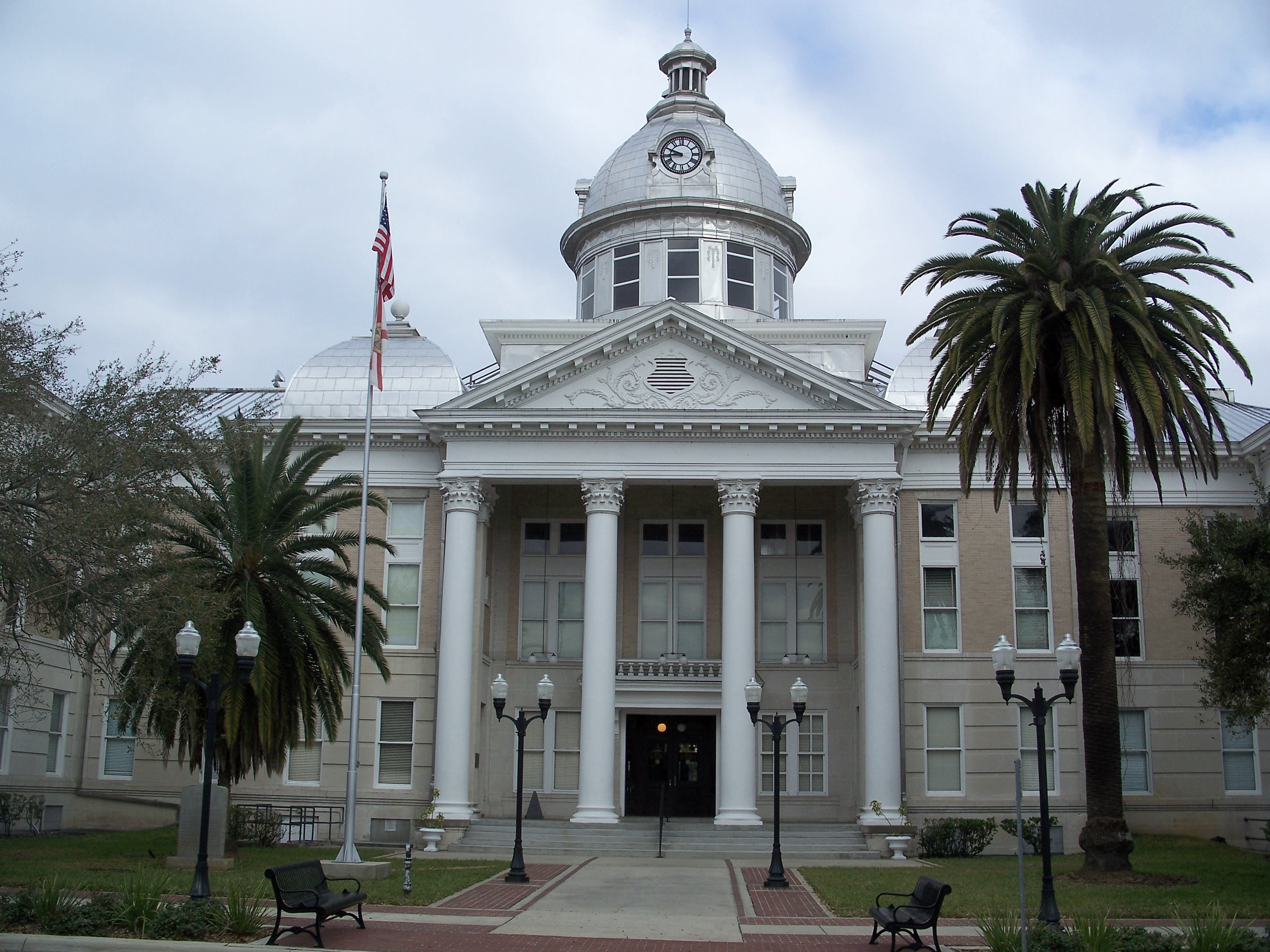

- Location within Florida Location within the United States
- Interactive map showing the location of Old Polk County Courthouse
- Location: Bartow, Florida
- Coordinates: 27°53′48″N 81°50′35″W
- Architect: Edward Columbus Hosford and Francis J. Kennard
- Architectural style: Classical Revival
- NRHP reference No.: 89001055
- Added to NRHP: August 7, 1989

The Old Polk County Courthouse (also known as the Imperial Polk County Courthouse) (constructed in 1908–09) is an historic courthouse in Bartow, Florida, United States, located at 100 East Main Street. It was ostensibly designed in the Classical Revival style by architect Edward Columbus Hosford. On August 7, 1989, it was added to the U.S. National Register of Historic Places.

The Polk County Historical Museum is located in the courthouse.
