= Marcus Floyd =

American football player (born 1978)

No. 30
- Position: Cornerback

Personal information
- Born: October 12, 1978 (age 48); Bartow, Florida, U.S.
- Listed height: 5 ft 9 in (1.75 m)
- Listed weight: 180 lb (82 kg)

Career information
- High school: Bartow
- College: Indiana
- NFL draft: 2002: undrafted

Career history
- New York Jets (2002); Buffalo Bills (2002–2003); Carolina Panthers (2004–2005); → Cologne Centurions (2004–2005)

Career NFL statistics
- Tackles: 5
- Stats at Pro Football Reference

Other information

Personal details
- Spouse: Monique J. Floyd
- Occupation: Minister

Marcus D. Floyd (born October 12, 1978) is an American minister and former professional football cornerback in the National Football League (NFL) for the New York Jets, Buffalo Bills and Carolina Panthers. He played college football for the Indiana Hoosiers.

== Football career ==
=== High school ===
Floyd earned all-state recognition as a senior at Bartow High School. He rushed for 1,002 yards and 14 touchdowns and helped lead his team to the 1996 Florida 4A state championship. Floyd had his #24 Jersey retired by Bartow Senior High School on October 4, 2013.

=== College career ===
At Indiana University, Floyd made 86 tackles, three interceptions, five pass deflections, two forced fumbles, and two fumble recoveries in two seasons as a defensive back. He switched from running back to defensive back midway through his red shirt junior year in 1999. In 2001, Floyd won the Ted Verlihay Award, given annually to the player who demonstrates the best mental attitude and loyalty to the Hoosier football program. He made 46 tackles, three interceptions, five pass deflections, one forced fumble and one fumble recovery while playing as a graduate student. In 2000, as a senior, Floyd started the final four games and made 40 tackles, one forced fumble and one fumble recovery. In 1999, as a junior, Floyd red shirted. In 1998, as a second year student (sophomore), Floyd moved to running back and made 315 yards on 64 carries. In 1997, as a freshman, Floyd began his career as a wide receiver and made one catch. Floyd was the winner of the Hoosier Strength and Conditioning challenge in both 1998 and 2001.

=== NFL ===
Floyd was originally signed as an undrafted rookie free agent by the New York Jets in 2002. He saw action in the Jets' first two games of the regular season, contributing two special teams tackles, and was inactive for one contest. He was then waived by the Jets. Floyd was then signed by the Buffalo Bills for their practice squad, but eventually was signed to the active roster for the final two contests of the season and recorded six special teams stops. He remained with the Bills until being waived prior to the 2003 season and was signed by the Carolina Panthers for the 2004 season after sitting out for all of 2003. Floyd played for the Carolina Panthers in 2004 and 2005. He was also allocated by the Carolina Panthers to play in NFL Europe, where he was the second cornerback drafted in the 2004 NFL Europe draft.

== Education ==
Floyd earned a Bachelor of Science degree in communications from Indiana University in 2001. Floyd also earned a Master of Arts degree in Christian leadership in 2008 and a Master of Divinity degree in 2010 from Liberty University. He graduated with a Doctor of Ministry degree from Liberty University in October 2020.
