= J. Adrian Jackson =

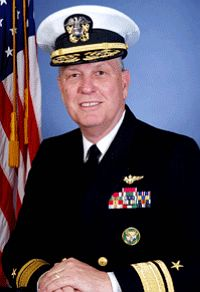
- Rear Admiral J. Adrian Jackson
- Born: Bartow, Florida
- Military career
- Allegiance: United States of America
- Branch: United States Navy
- Service years: 1970-Present
- Rank: Rear Admiral
- Commands: U.S. Central Command Deputy Director
- Conflicts: Operation Iraqi Freedom; Desert Shield; Desert Storm
- Awards: Legion of Merit; Meritorious Service Medal; Navy Commendation Medal

J. Adrian Jackson is a Rear Admiral in the U.S. Navy. He is the Deputy Director for the U.S. Central Command.

He has served as Commander of the Naval Reserve Readiness Command South, and as Vice Commander, Maritime Defense Zone, U.S. Atlantic Fleet.

== Education ==
- Bachelor's degree from Florida State University in 1970.
