= City nickname =

Alias by which a city is known

A city nickname or municipality nickname is an alias, sobriquet, or slogan by which a city or other municipality is or has been known. They have various purposes and anecdotally have led to economic benefits for communities.

== Description ==
A municipality nickname is an alias or sobriquet that a city or other municipality is known by (or have historically been known by), to municipal governments, local people, outsiders, or their tourism boards or chambers of commerce. They may be official or unofficial. Municipality may also be associated with mottos, slogans, or taglines.

== Use ==
City nicknames and slogans can help in establishing a civic identity, helping outsiders recognize a community, attracting people to a community because of its nickname, promote civic pride, and build community unity. Nicknames and slogans that successfully create a new community "ideology or myth" are also believed to have economic value. Their economic value is difficult to measure, but there are anecdotal reports of cities that have achieved substantial economic benefits by "branding" themselves by adopting new slogans. Some unofficial nicknames are positive, while others are derisive.

== See also ==
- Lists of city nicknames
