= WQXM =

- Bartow, Florida; United States
- Broadcast area: Central Polk County, Florida
- Frequency: 1460 kHz
- Branding: La Kaliente 99.9

Programming
- Format: Silent (formerly Spanish language Contemporary Hits)

Ownership
- Owner: Denisse Hernandez; (Prime Broadcasting, Inc.)

History
- First air date: September 30, 2004; 21 years ago (as WRMX)
- Former call signs: WBAR, WRMX

Technical information
- Licensing authority: FCC
- Facility ID: 71202
- Class: D
- Power: 10,000 watts (days); 155 watts (nights)
- Transmitter coordinates: 27°54′34″N 81°51′29″W

Links
- Public license information: Public file; LMS

WQXM (1460 kHz) is a commercial AM radio station licensed to Bartow in Central Florida. It aired a Spanish language Contemporary Hits radio format known as "La Kaliente 99.9" (sometimes shortened to "K-Liente"). It is owned by Denisse Hernandez, through licensee Prime Broadcasting, Inc.

WQXM and its FM translator suspended operations on June 7th, 2025, citing financial losses and technical difficulties. While the AM station remains the property of Prime Broadcasting, Walco Enterprises, LLC agreed to purchase the FM translator for $100,000.

== History ==
The station signed on the air as WBAR on October 23, 1953, licensed to William Avera Wynne. On January 23, 2004, then-owner Bartow Broadcasting Co., Inc. agreed to sell WBAR to Florida Broadcasting Media, LLC for $325,000, and the station changed its call sign to WRMX on September 30, 2004; then changing once again to the current WQXM on October 11, 2004. The station's license was reassigned from its owner Aliuska Leiva Marti operating through DRC Broadcasting, Inc., to Denisse Hernandez of Prime Broadcasting, Inc. on July 5, 2024. WQXM filed a Silent Special Temporary Authority application with the FCC on June 7, 2025, citing "ongoing technical issues affecting signal quality and resulting financial losses."

== Former logos ==
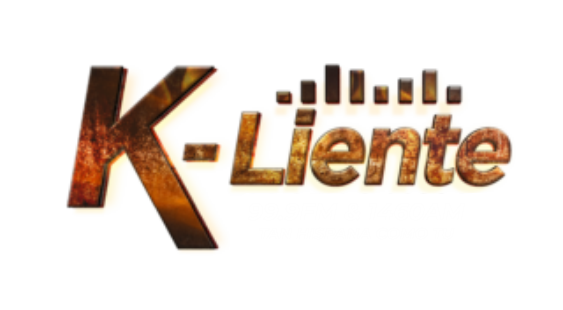
