= Bartow, Florida =

- City
- City of Bartow
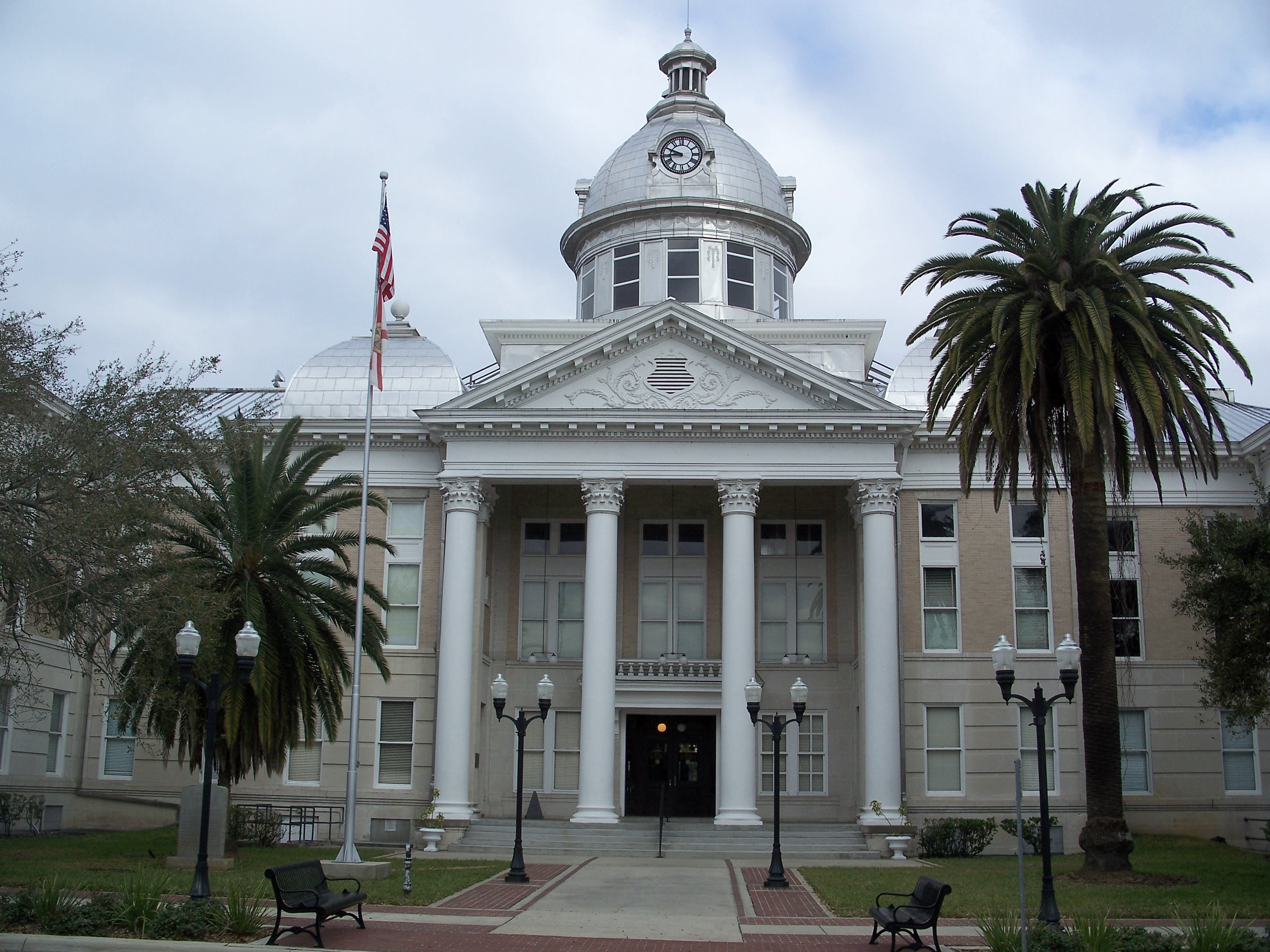
- Old Polk County Courthouse

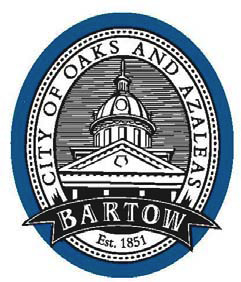
- Flag Seal
- Nickname: City of Oaks and Azaleas
- Motto: "Polk County's Capital City"
- Location of Bartow in Polk County, Florida
- Coordinates: 27°53′23″N 81°49′20″W
- Country: United States
- State: Florida
- County: Polk
- First Settled: Pre-Columbian Era
- Nearby Black Seminole settlement: Late 1810s
- Resettled: 1851
- Incorporated: July 1, 1882

Government
  - Mayor: Tanya Tucker
  - City commission: Members: Gary Ball; Tanya Tucker; Leo E. Longworth; Trish Pfeiffer; Laura Simpson
  - Vice Mayor: Laura Simpson
  - U.S. Congress: Laurel Lee (R)

Area
  - City: 52.78 sq mi (136.71 km^{2})
  - Land: 46.42 sq mi (120.23 km^{2})
  - Water: 6.36 sq mi (16.48 km^{2})
- Elevation: 118 ft (36 m)

Population (2020)
  - City: 19,309
  - Estimate (2025): 23,617
  - Density: 416/sq mi (160.6/km^{2})
  - Metro: 787,404
- Time zone: UTC-5 (Eastern (EST))
  - Summer (DST): UTC-4 (EDT)
- ZIP codes: 33830-33831
- Area code: 863
- FIPS code: 12-03675
- GNIS feature ID: 2403163
- Website: cityofbartow.net

Bartow (/ˈbɑːrtoʊ/ BAR-toh) is a city and the county seat of Polk County, Florida, United States. Founded in 1851 as Fort Blount, the city was renamed in honor of Francis S. Bartow, the first brigade commander of the Confederate Army to die in combat during the American Civil War. It is part of the Lakeland−Winter Haven Metropolitan Statistical Area, which had an estimated population of 787,404, as of July 1, 2022. According to the 2020 Census, the city had a population of 19,309.

Located near the source of the Peace River, Bartow is approximately 39 miles (63 km) east of Tampa, Florida and 50 miles (80 km) southwest of the Greater Orlando area. The city is near the center of "Lightning Alley" and has frequent afternoon thunderstorms in the summer, but typically has sunny and mild winters. Government, mining, and agriculture are the major sectors of the area's economy. The primary roads in the Bartow area are U.S. Route 17, U.S. Route 98 and State Road 60, which provide access to locations throughout Central Florida.

The official city nickname is the "City of Oaks and Azaleas"; residents are known as Bartowans. Three districts within the city are on the National Register of Historic Places. Other historic landmarks include the Old Polk County Courthouse built in 1909 and Bartow High School, formerly Summerlin Institute, the oldest high school in the county. Summerlin Academy now uses the space and was named for the historic school. Although Bartow has been eclipsed in population, importance and name recognition by other cities in the county, particularly Lakeland and Winter Haven, the city has retained its small city heritage and its distinctive Southern culture. With the annexation of 18,000 acres (73 km^{2}) of former phosphate mining land owned by the Clear Springs Land Company, Bartow's population is projected to increase to over 25,000 by 2025 and over 45,000 by 2030.

== History ==
A Spanish map of the Florida peninsula drawn in 1527 shows a native settlement called Rio de la Paz near present-day Bartow. Little is known about these Native Americans who made their home near present-day Bartow. It is likely that their population suffered high mortality from European diseases, such as smallpox and measles. The remnants of these pre-Columbian peoples probably joined the Creek Indians who migrated from the north to become the Seminole Indian tribe.

The first non-Indian settlement in the area was a colony of Black Seminole, free blacks and escaped slaves who established Minatti south of Lake Hancock in the late 1810s. These "maroons", as they were commonly called, were slaves who escaped from Georgia and the Carolinas. The Black Seminole of Minatti were allies of the Red Stick Creek in Talakchopko, a village that preceded present-day Fort Meade. The Seminole leader Osceola had strong ties to Talakchopko. Many of the events leading up to the Second Seminole War were associated with Osceola and the Minatti war chief Harry. By the end of the Second Seminole War in 1842, both Minatti and Talakchopko had been destroyed by US forces.

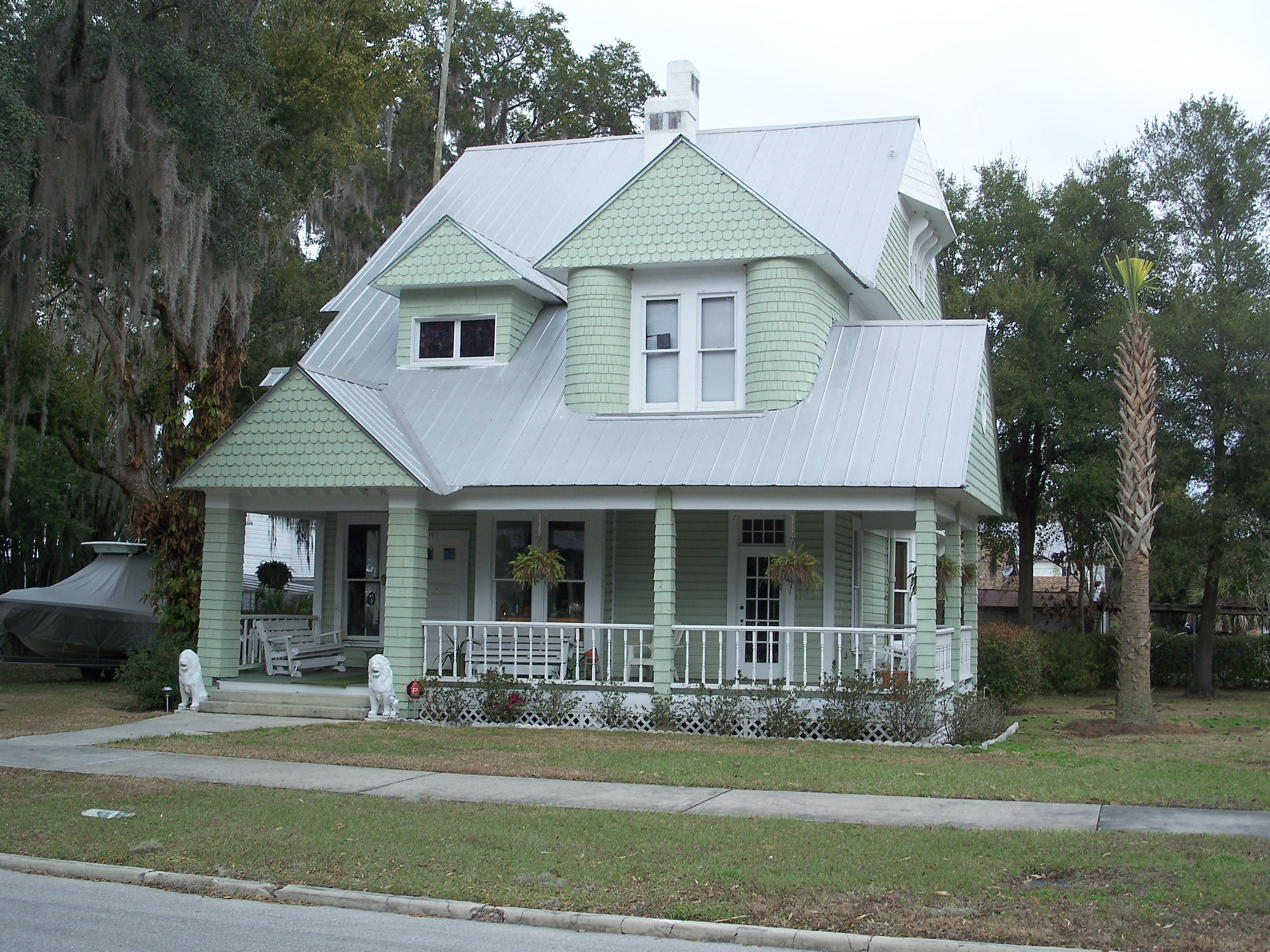
The Benjamin Franklin Holland House located at 590 East Stanford Avenue

The Armed Occupation Act of 1842 facilitated European-American settlement of the Florida peninsula in the 1840s, although the act prohibited settlement near the Peace River, as this was considered Seminole land. Enforcement of that part of the act was not strictly enforced; however, and settlers eventually moved into the area. As the settlement grew, the residents began to plant citrus trees and build one-room school houses and churches. In 1851, Fort Blount was established by Redding Blount. Bartow developed east of this site. At some point in the 1850s, Fort Blount was renamed Peace Creek or Peas Creek, which was a translation of the Spanish Rio de la Paz of early maps.

About a month after the secession of Florida in 1861, the state established Polk County from the eastern portion of Hillsborough County. A few months later, the American Civil War began with the Battle of Fort Sumter. Because of the turmoil of secession and the war, the county had no official county seat for its first six years. The state legislature had directed the voters of Polk County to choose a site for the county seat and mandated that the site be named "Reidsville". During the war, the area's major contribution to the Confederacy was supplying food, particularly cattle and beef. The Union army and navy had effective control of the west coast of Florida, and many cattlemen retreated inland and formed the "Cow Cavalry" as a defense against Union troops. One of the wealthiest members of the Cow Cavalry was Jacob Summerlin. After Summerlin purchased the Blount property in 1862, he donated a large parcel of land to build a county courthouse, two churches and a school. Later that year, the town which had been known as Fort Blount, Peace Creek, Peas Creek, and briefly Reidsville, was permanently renamed Bartow in honor of Francis S. Bartow, the first Confederate brigade commander to die during the war.

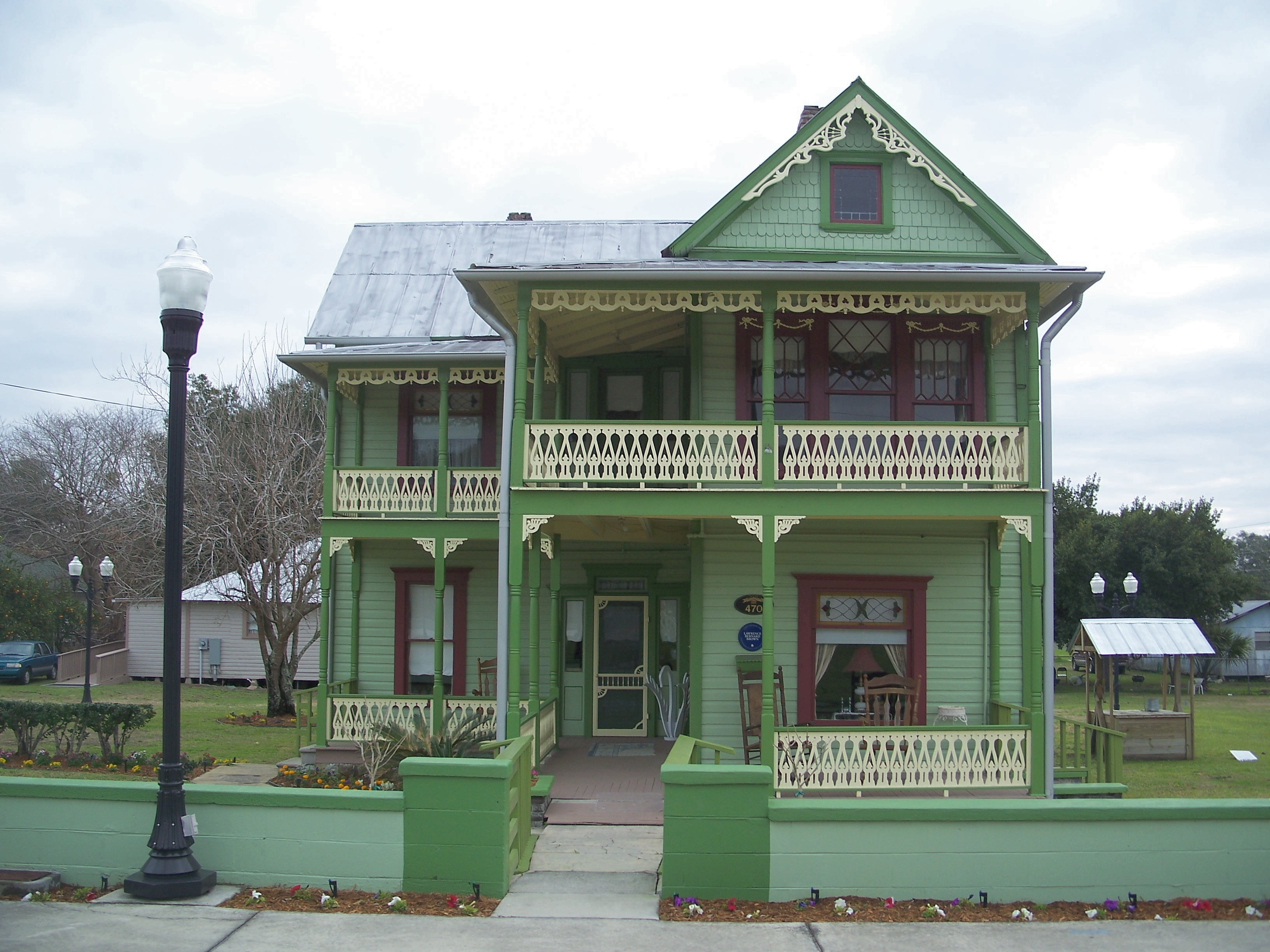
The L.B. Brown House located at 470 South Second Avenue

Bartow recovered slowly from the war. The first Polk County Courthouse was built in 1867, which firmly established the city as county seat. Although Florida formally rejoined the union in 1868, the Reconstruction era did not end in Florida until 1877.

The 1880s and 1890s were a period of growth for the city of Bartow; from 1880 to 1900, the city would grow from 386 residents to 1,983. On July 1, 1882, the town was incorporated as a city. In 1885, the Florida Southern Railroad, a north–south route from North Florida to Southwest Florida opened in Bartow. A year later, the Bartow Branch of the South Florida Railroad, connecting Tampa and Orlando, was completed. The railroads were catalysts for growth of the area; during the Spanish–American War, the Bartow rail yards became a crucial part of the supply line directed at US troops in Cuba. In 1887, Summerlin Institute, the first brick schoolhouse south of Jacksonville, was built.

By the turn of the century, Bartow had become the most populous city south of Tampa on the Florida peninsula – larger than Miami or West Palm Beach.

As the city grew, a number of industries moved into the Bartow area. In the first few decades of the 1900s, thousands of acres of land around the city were purchased by the phosphate industry. Bartow would become the hub of the largest phosphate industry in the United States.

Polk County was the leading citrus county in the United States for much of the 20th century and the city has several large groves. In 1941, the city built an airport northeast of town. The airport was taken over by the federal government during World War II and was the training location for many Army Air Corps pilots during the war. The airport was returned to the city in 1967 and renamed Bartow Municipal Airport.

For most of the 20th century, Bartow's growth was modest, especially in comparison to the rest of the county and state. While other cities in Polk County aggressively annexed adjacent land and allowed rapid growth, the government of Bartow generally took a more cautious approach. Bartow's growth was also limited because most of the land surrounding the city was owned by phosphate mining companies, making residential growth impractical. Although Bartow had been the largest city in Polk county in 1900, by the 1910 U.S. Census, Lakeland had surpassed it in population. Bartow remained the second largest city in the county until sometime in the 1950s, when Winter Haven superseded it.

In the late 1990s phosphate operations in the area moved southward, and much of the former phosphate land became available for sale. In 1999, Connecticut financier Stanford Phelps purchased the former Clear Springs phosphate lands east and south of city limits; he announced plans for an 18,000-acre development, the largest project in Polk County history. After nearly a decade of delays, the plan received final approval in 2009. The Clear Springs Development includes plans for more than 11,000 new homes, 1,000,000 square feet (93,000 m^{2}) of commercial space, three schools, and a golf course. According to the Central Florida Regional Planning Council, Bartow's population was projected to grow to over 25,000 people by 2015. When buildout of the Clear Springs Development is completed by 2030, the population of the city is projected to be over 45,000 residents.

== Geography and climate ==
=== Geography ===
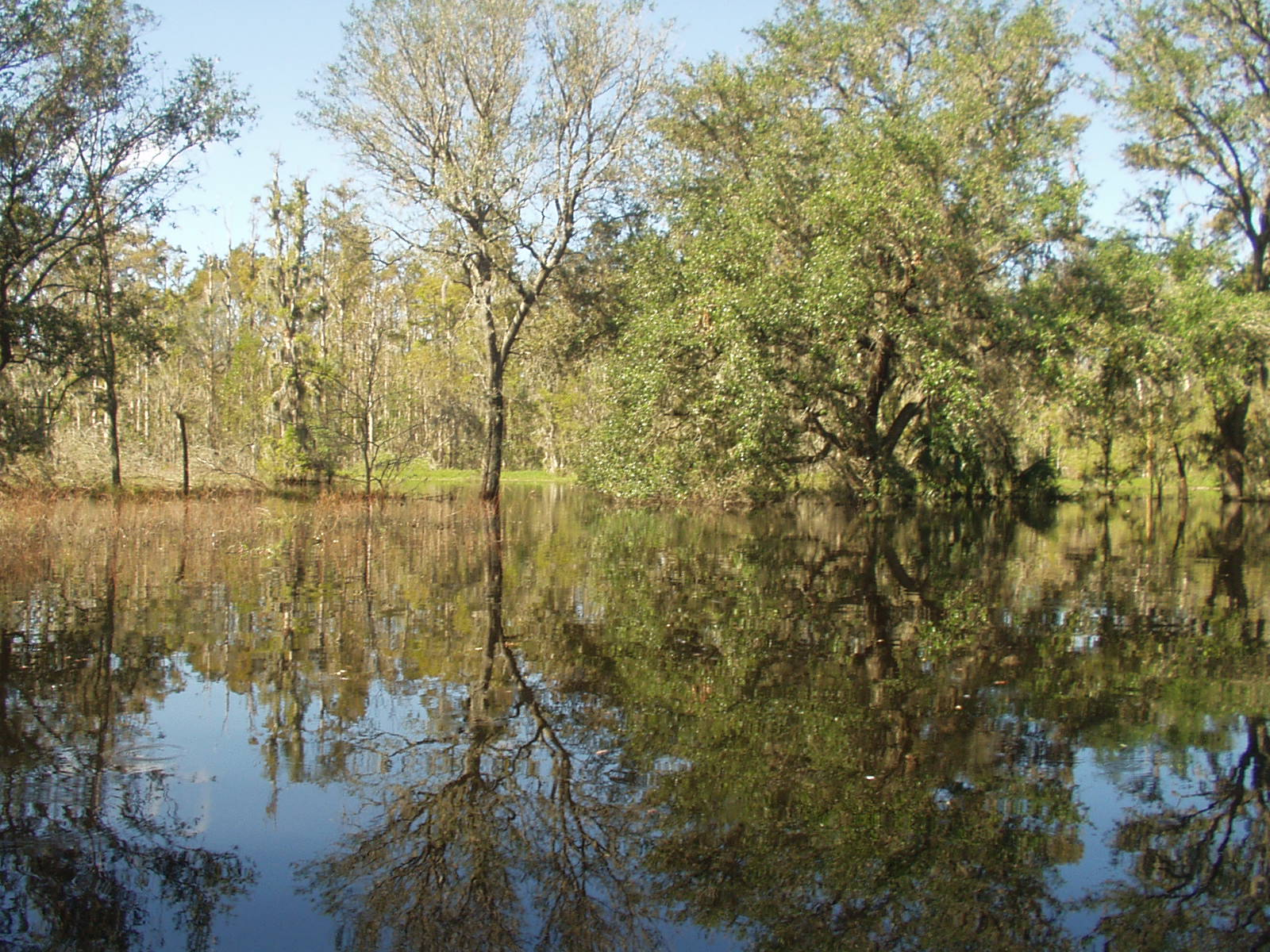
Flooding of the Peace River after a hurricane

Bartow is located slightly southwest of the geographical centers of both Polk County and peninsular Florida. The city is approximately 39 miles (63 km) east of Tampa and 51 miles (82 km) southwest of Orlando. The cities of Bartow, Lakeland, and Winter Haven form a roughly equilateral triangle pointed southward, with Bartow being the south point, Lakeland the west point, and Winter Haven the east point. The city is located near the headwaters of the Peace River at Lake Hancock. Bartow is located within the Central Florida Highlands area of the Atlantic coastal plain with a terrain consisting of flatland interspersed with gently rolling hills.

According to the United States Census Bureau, in 2000 the city had a total area of 11.4 square miles (30 km^{2}), of which 11.2 square miles (29 km^{2}) is land and 0.1 square miles (0.26 km^{2}) (1.23%) is water. As a result of the annexation of over 26,000 acres (110 km^{2}) of undeveloped land, primarily the Clear Springs land, the area of the city has quadrupled to over 52 square miles (130 km^{2}) with more annexation still pending.

=== Physiography and soils ===
Bartow is located on the South Central Florida Ridge, as classified by the USDA. Most soils in the Bartow area are sandy; other soils have sandy surface layers and clay subsoils, and the eastern outskirts of town have a clay-rich floodplain through which the Peace River flows. Drainage outside of the floodplain ranges from good to excessive for the most part except for a poorly drained band which cuts across the northern part of town. Much of Bartow is built on the Fort Meade soil series, which is well drained, high in organic matter, and rich in phosphorus, an uncommon combination in Florida, much appreciated by area gardeners.

=== Climate ===
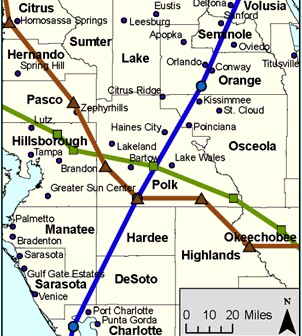
Paths of hurricanes Charley (blue), Francis (green) and Jeanne (red) in 2004

Bartow, like most of Florida, is located in the humid subtropical zone (Köppen climate classification: Cfa). The climate of Bartow and other inland cities is slightly different than those cities on the coasts of Florida. Typically, the ocean or gulf tends to moderate the climate of cities on the coast. As Bartow is further from the coast than almost any other city in Florida, it tends to have higher daytime temperatures cooler temperatures at night. Regardless, the climate pattern prevalent throughout central Florida is evident in Bartow: hot, humid summers with frequent afternoon thunderstorms and relatively drier and milder winters.

On average, a tropical system brings hurricane-force winds to the Polk County area less than once every ten years, although the 2004 hurricane season in which three hurricanes hit within 44 days was a case study in the law of averages. Until 2004, the most recent storm to bring hurricane-force winds to the Bartow area had been Hurricane Donna in 1960. While Florida's vulnerability to hurricanes is well known, hurricanes are not the most common severe weather threat seen in the Polk County area. The area is in the center of "lightning alley", the most concentrated lightning strike area in the United States. Lightning is not the only threat from central Florida thunderstorms. The more severe storms bring the threat of tornadoes, although Florida tornadoes very rarely reach the size of those elsewhere in the United States. Even hail is not out of the question; one storm in March 1996 caused a one-foot accumulation of hail in areas of Bartow.

Freezes are an occasional occurrence in the Bartow area and can be a problem if temperatures remain below freezing for a sustained period of time. On average, the area can expect an annual minimum temperature of 32 °F (0 °C), putting it in plant hardiness zone 10a. Snow is a rare phenomenon in the area, perhaps a few times every century.

Climate data for Bartow, Florida, 1991–2020 normals, extremes 1892–present
Month	Jan	Feb	Mar	Apr	May	Jun	Jul	Aug	Sep	Oct	Nov	Dec	Year
Record high °F (°C)	90 (32)	91 (33)	97 (36)	99 (37)	101 (38)	103 (39)	102 (39)	100 (38)	98 (37)	97 (36)	96 (36)	90 (32)	103 (39)
Mean maximum °F (°C)	83.2 (28.4)	85.4 (29.7)	87.9 (31.1)	91.3 (32.9)	94.6 (34.8)	96.2 (35.7)	96.3 (35.7)	95.9 (35.5)	94.4 (34.7)	91.5 (33.1)	87.4 (30.8)	83.7 (28.7)	97.3 (36.3)
Mean daily maximum °F (°C)	72.9 (22.7)	75.9 (24.4)	79.7 (26.5)	84.2 (29.0)	88.7 (31.5)	90.9 (32.7)	91.9 (33.3)	91.7 (33.2)	89.7 (32.1)	85.2 (29.6)	79.0 (26.1)	74.7 (23.7)	83.7 (28.7)
Daily mean °F (°C)	61.2 (16.2)	64.0 (17.8)	67.7 (19.8)	72.5 (22.5)	77.6 (25.3)	81.1 (27.3)	82.3 (27.9)	82.3 (27.9)	80.7 (27.1)	75.5 (24.2)	68.3 (20.2)	63.6 (17.6)	73.1 (22.8)
Mean daily minimum °F (°C)	49.5 (9.7)	52.1 (11.2)	55.7 (13.2)	60.8 (16.0)	66.4 (19.1)	71.3 (21.8)	72.6 (22.6)	72.9 (22.7)	71.8 (22.1)	65.9 (18.8)	57.5 (14.2)	52.6 (11.4)	62.4 (16.9)
Mean minimum °F (°C)	34.1 (1.2)	37.2 (2.9)	42.4 (5.8)	50.2 (10.1)	58.8 (14.9)	67.8 (19.9)	70.3 (21.3)	70.5 (21.4)	67.4 (19.7)	53.2 (11.8)	44.1 (6.7)	37.6 (3.1)	32.3 (0.2)
Record low °F (°C)	18 (−8)	22 (−6)	23 (−5)	34 (1)	45 (7)	56 (13)	60 (16)	61 (16)	55 (13)	32 (0)	25 (−4)	18 (−8)	18 (−8)
Average precipitation inches (mm)	2.66 (68)	2.10 (53)	2.84 (72)	2.72 (69)	2.95 (75)	8.28 (210)	7.56 (192)	7.78 (198)	7.31 (186)	3.03 (77)	1.49 (38)	2.16 (55)	50.88 (1,292)
Average precipitation days (≥ 0.01 in)	6.0	5.2	5.5	4.8	6.5	13.0	15.0	15.7	12.3	7.0	4.4	5.5	100.9
Source: NOAA

== Demographics ==
Historical population
Census	Pop.	Note	%±
1880	386		—
1890	1,386		259.1%
1900	1,983		43.1%
1910	2,662		34.2%
1920	4,101		54.1%
1930	5,269		28.5%
1940	6,158		16.9%
1950	8,694		41.2%
1960	12,849		47.8%
1970	12,891		0.3%
1980	14,780		14.7%
1990	14,716		−0.4%
2000	15,340		4.2%
2010	17,298		12.8%
2020	19,309		11.6%
2025 (est.)	23,617		22.3%
Population 1890-2000.

=== Racial and ethnic composition ===
Bartow racial composition (Hispanics excluded from racial categories) (NH = Non-Hispanic)
Race	Pop 2010	Pop 2020	% 2010	% 2020
White (NH)	10,216	10,576	59.06%	54.77%
Black or African American (NH)	4,023	4,245	23.26%	21.98%
Native American or Alaska Native (NH)	36	33	0.21%	0.17%
Asian (NH)	187	284	1.08%	1.47%
Pacific Islander or Native Hawaiian (NH)	10	6	0.06%	0.03%
Some other race (NH)	21	103	0.12%	0.53%
Two or more races/Multiracial (NH)	259	645	1.50%	3.34%
Hispanic or Latino (any race)	2,546	3,417	14.72%	17.70%
Total	17,298	19,309		

=== 2020 census ===
As of the 2020 census, Bartow had a population of 19,309. The median age was 37.5 years. 24.7% of residents were under the age of 18 and 17.5% of residents were 65 years of age or older. For every 100 females there were 88.3 males, and for every 100 females age 18 and over there were 83.7 males age 18 and over.

88.5% of residents lived in urban areas, while 11.5% lived in rural areas.

There were 7,030 households in Bartow, of which 34.6% had children under the age of 18 living in them. Of all households, 42.9% were married-couple households, 17.4% were households with a male householder and no spouse or partner present, and 32.0% were households with a female householder and no spouse or partner present. About 25.9% of all households were made up of individuals and 12.1% had someone living alone who was 65 years of age or older.

There were 7,682 housing units, of which 8.5% were vacant. The homeowner vacancy rate was 2.7% and the rental vacancy rate was 7.4%.

Racial composition as of the 2020 census
Race	Number	Percent
White	11,493	59.5%
Black or African American	4,350	22.5%
American Indian and Alaska Native	72	0.4%
Asian	288	1.5%
Native Hawaiian and Other Pacific Islander	6	0.0%
Some other race	1,271	6.6%
Two or more races	1,829	9.5%
Hispanic or Latino (of any race)	3,417	17.7%

=== 2010 census ===
As of the 2010 United States census, there were 17,298 people, 5,909 households, and 4,097 families residing in the city.

In 2010, the population density was 377.1 inhabitants per square mile of land (976.7/km^{2}). There were 7,130 housing units at an average density of 155.4 per square mile of land (402.5/km^{2}).

In 2010, there were 5,909 households, of which 67.4% were families (one or more other people related to the householder by birth, marriage, or adoption), 27.4% consisted of individuals, 35.6% had children under the age of 18 living with them, 43.2% were heterosexual married couples living together, 18.5% had a female householder with no husband present, and 30.1% had someone living alone who was 65 years of age or older. The average household size was 2.57 and the average family size was 3.12. Among housing units, 87.7% were occupied and 1.4% were for seasonal, recreational, or occasional use; 63.5% of occupied housing units were owner-occupied and 36.5% were occupied by renters.

In 2010, the median age was 36.2 years; 25.8% under the age of 18, 9.3% from 18 to 24, 26.0% from 25 to 44, 24.1% from 45 to 64, and 14.8% who were 65 years of age or older. For every 100 males there were 112.6 females. For every 100 males age 18 and over, there were 120.1 females.

=== 2009–2013 American Community Survey ===
According to the American Community Survey between 2009 and 2013, the median income for a household in the city was 44,297, and the median income for a family was 56,009. Among full-time, year-round workers, males had a median income of $39,540 versus $32,076 for females. The per capita income for the city was $18,994. About 17.2% of families and 22.6% of the population were below the poverty line, including 33.9% of those under age 18 and 13.3% of those age 65 or over.

=== Religion ===
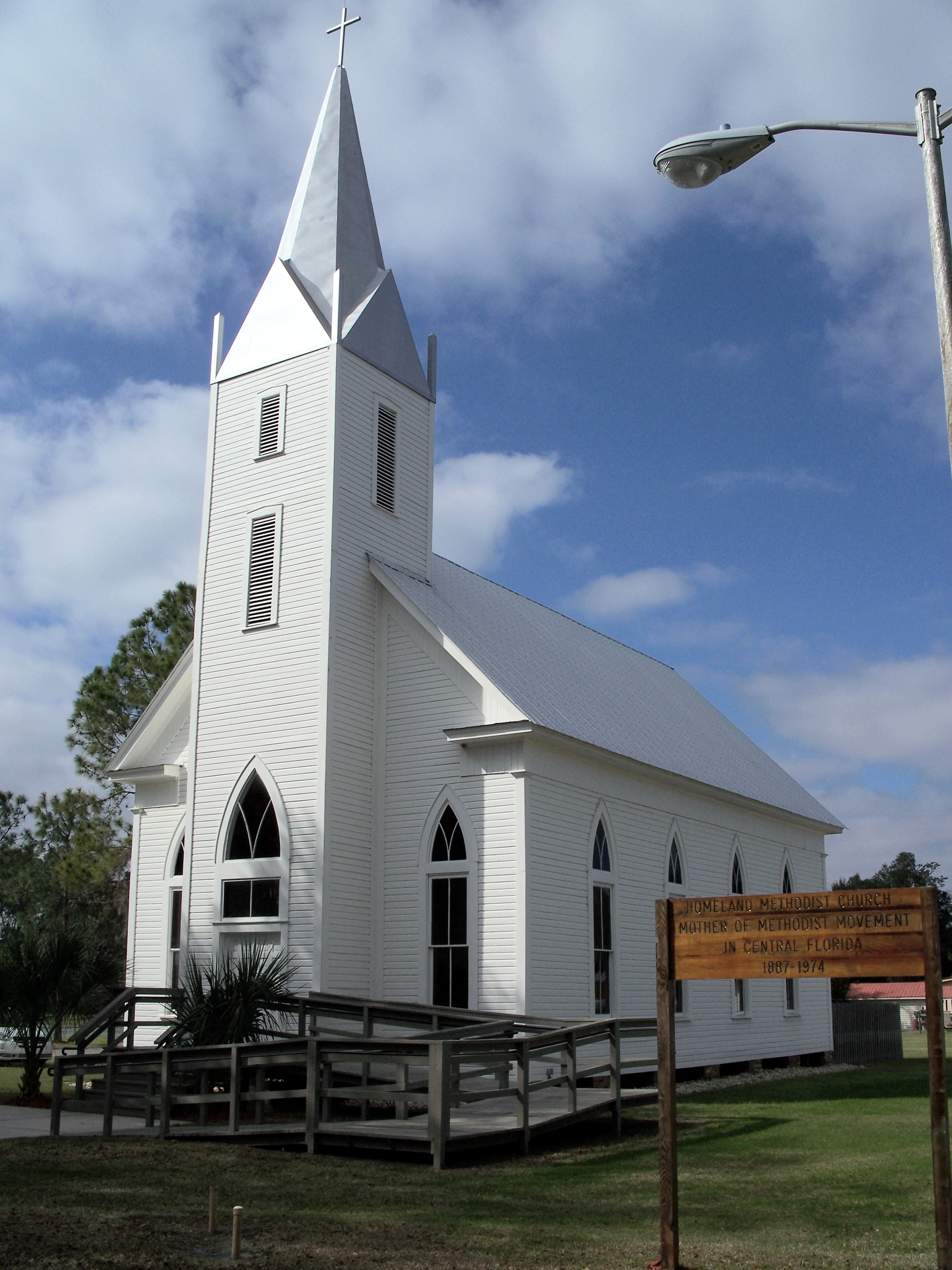
The historic Homeland Methodist Church just south of town

The first two churches built in town, the First Baptist and the First Methodist churches, were constructed on land given by the city founder Jacob Summerlin in 1867. Jacob Summerlin was known as the "King of the Crackers" and owned much of the land located around Bartow. These churches, although not housed in the original buildings, are still extant today. In 1919, more than 8,000 people came to Bartow to hear former baseball star and traveling evangelist Billy Sunday preach, which was twice as much as the population of Bartow and more than the population of the county's largest city Lakeland at the time. As of 2010, there are more than 70 churches within the Bartow area.

Like most of the Bible Belt, Bartow has a high number of people affiliated with evangelical Protestant denominations with over 62% of churchgoers belonging to evangelical denominations. According to data published by the Glenmary Research Center in 2000, the denomination which has the largest number of adherents in Bartow is the Southern Baptist Convention with 27%, followed by the Roman Catholic church with 19%. Pentecostal/Charismatic churches are also prominent making up 17% of Bartow's church attendance. The Pentecostal experience known as the Lakeland revival, which attracted controversy for its claims of supernatural healing, was started up the road at the Carpenter's Home Church in Lakeland. Other churches which have a presence in Bartow include the United Methodist Church at 9%, and the Episcopal and Lutheran churches with 2% apiece. While there are no synagogues in town for Jewish Bartowans, Temple Emanuel is a conservative synagogue only 12 miles (19 km) away in Lakeland. There are two Muslim mosques and a Hindu temple in the county.

== Economy ==
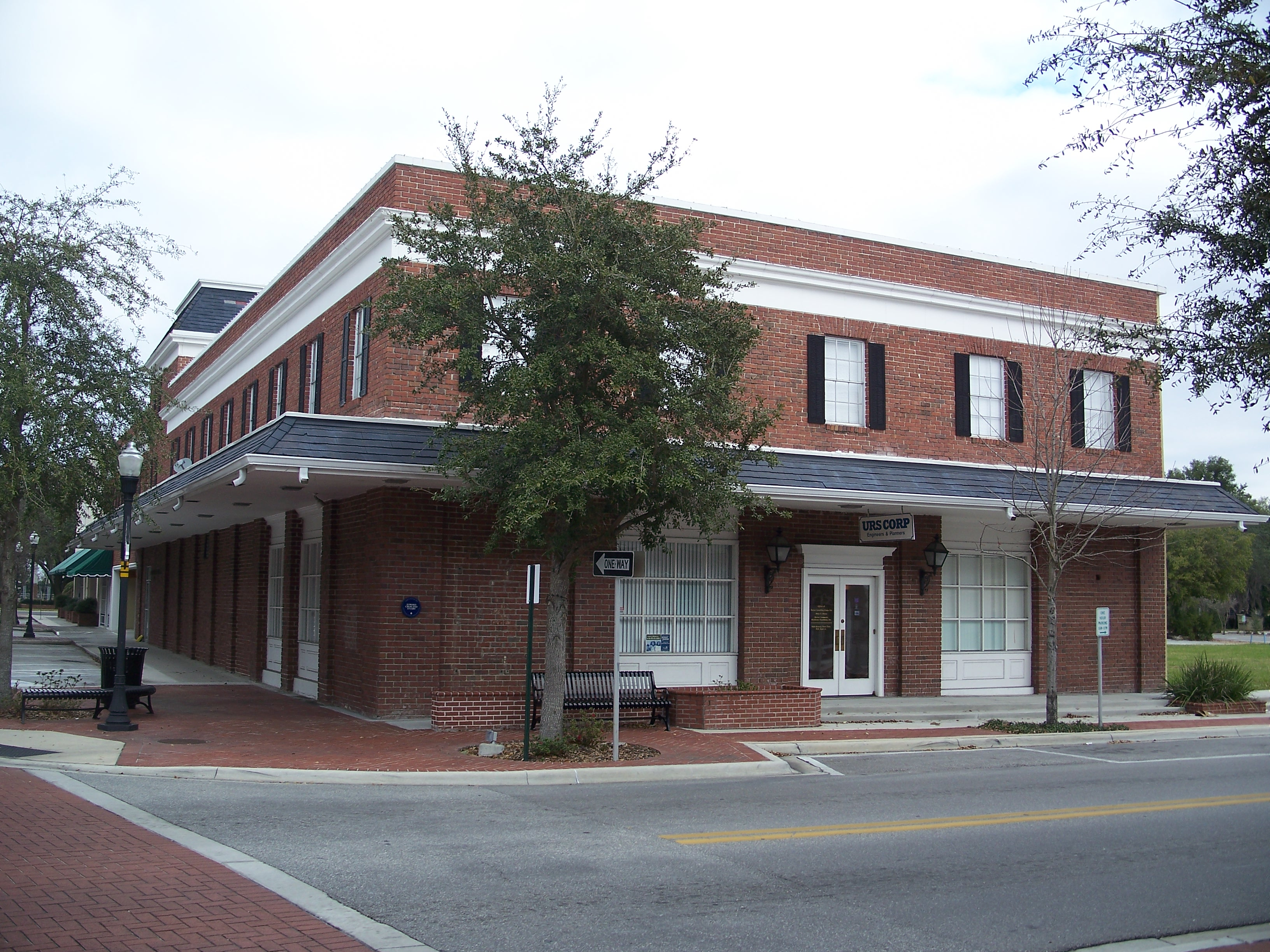
Stuart Building, downtown Bartow

The economy of Bartow is driven by four sectors: government, mining, agriculture, and tourism. While Bartow's population is less than 20,000, it is shaped by its proximity to several large centers of population. Within a 100-mile (160 km) radius of the center of town, there are close to 8 million people.

The dominant force in the economy of Bartow is city, county and state government. As a small city which is the seat of a county with over half a million people. In addition to city and county offices, there are also a number of regional, state, and federal offices located within Bartow city limits. Nine of the seventeen largest employers in Bartow are government entities. The largest by far is the Polk County School Board with over 12,000 employees. Other county entities which employ many people in the Bartow area include the county commission, the sheriff's department, the clerk of court, the tax collector, and the property appraiser. The Florida Department of Transportation District One office is located in Bartow and is responsible for southwest Florida's transportation needs.

There are several large businesses with headquarters elsewhere which were founded in Bartow. The large international law firm of Holland & Knight was founded in Bartow in 1929. What eventually become the large Burdines and Sons department store chain was founded in Bartow in 1896 as Payne and Burdines. A couple years after opening his store, William M. Burdines opened a store in Miami and relocated his operations there.

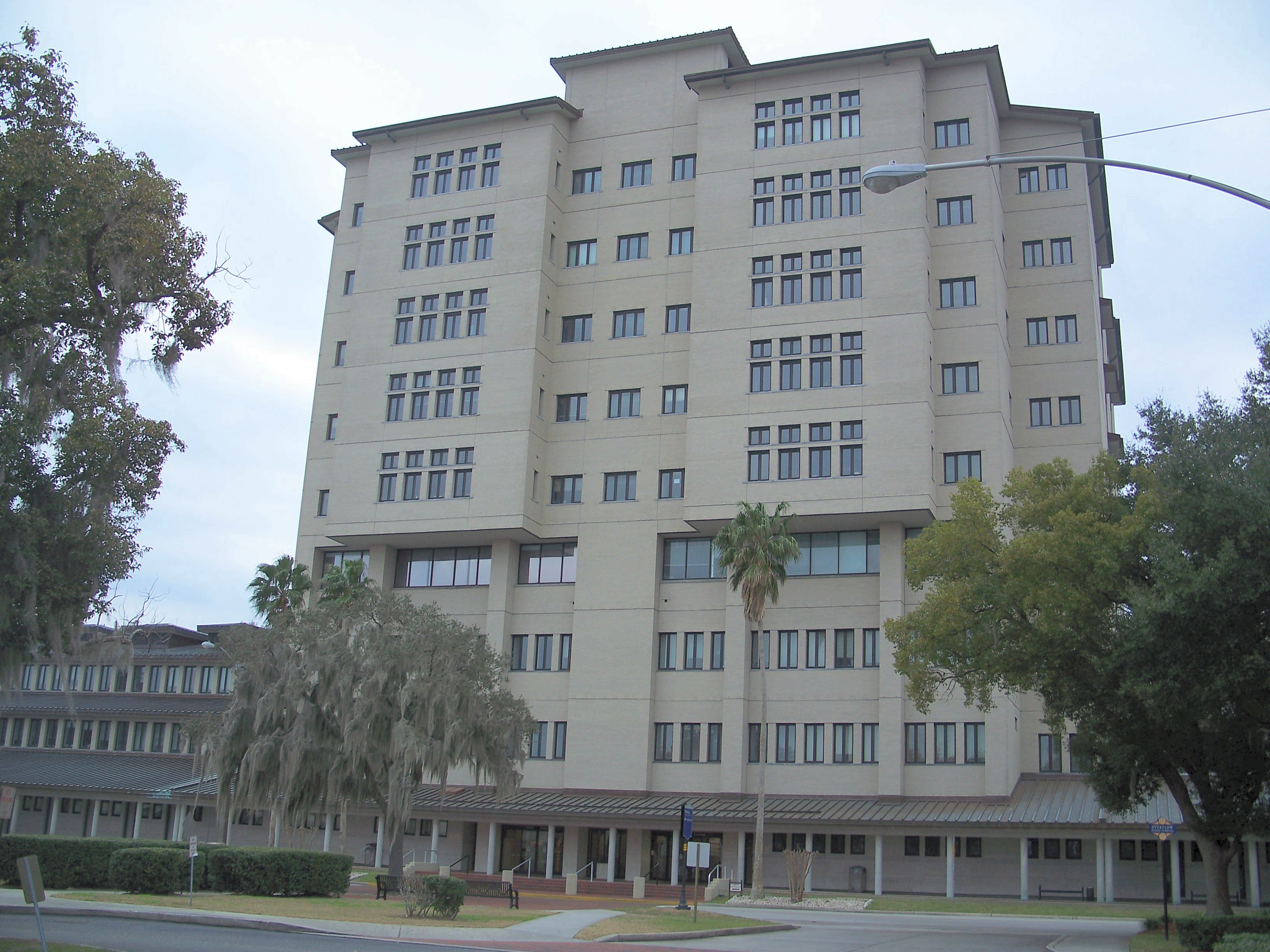
The current Polk County Courthouse

Phosphate mining has been a major player in Bartow's economy since the discovery of phosphate rock in 1881. Polk County is part of the Bone Valley which is the richest source of phosphate rock in the world; 75% of the United States's supply and 25% of the world's supply come from the Bone Valley. The largest employer in the phosphate industry is Mosaic which employs over 3,000 people in the area.

In terms of area, Polk County has 600,000 acres (2,400 km^{2}) dedicated to agriculture. According to the US Census of Agriculture, Polk County is the top citrus production county in Florida. Polk County is also ranked second in the state in production of honey and fourth in number of heads of cattle. Since 1997, the new bumper crop in the area is blueberry. From 2000 to 2007 the area has more than doubled its production of blueberries and accounts for more than 35% of the state's production of the fruit. While spring is usually a "dead" time for every other blueberry growing area in North and South America, Polk County blueberries peak from March to May.

Although there are no major tourist attractions in the immediate Bartow area, the city is located less than 50 miles (80 km) from both the Walt Disney World Resort and Busch Gardens Tampa Bay. The city is also less than 20 miles (32 km) from Legoland Florida in Winter Haven and Bok Tower Gardens in Lake Wales. As a city with many historical sites dating back over 100 years, Bartow is also a point of interest for those interested in historical sites and monuments.

== Culture ==
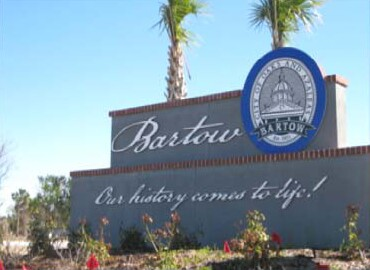
The sign at the northwest entrance of Bartow on US 98

=== Annual festivals and other events ===
Several annual events in the Bartow area have a long tradition. Many are large events which draw people from other communities, such as the Cricket Club Halloween Parade and Carnival, held each year since 1942, or the annual Fourth of July celebration, held at Mosaic Park. The Bloomin' Arts Festival is an art show held in early March by the Bartow Art Guild. Every February brings the Annual L.B. Brown Festival at the L.B. Brown House on L.B. Brown Avenue (formally Second Avenue).

Bartow's discarded natural Christmas trees are piled around a telephone pole for the annual New Year's Eve bonfire, a tradition spanning more than seven decades which has been covered by national media.

The Polk County Arts Alliance based in Bartow is designated the official art agency by the county commission and is in charge of furthering the performing arts in the county. The Bartow Performing Arts Series sponsors five performances every year. The Imperial Symphony Orchestra is an ensemble of ninety volunteer musicians throughout the county who perform a dozen or so events every year, including a concert under the stars. The city's volunteer band, the Bartow Adult Concert Band, performs several shows a year. On the third Friday of every month, Main Street is blocked off for Friday Fest at 6 p.m. for a night of live music and entertainment, informally known as "Tow Jam" by natives.

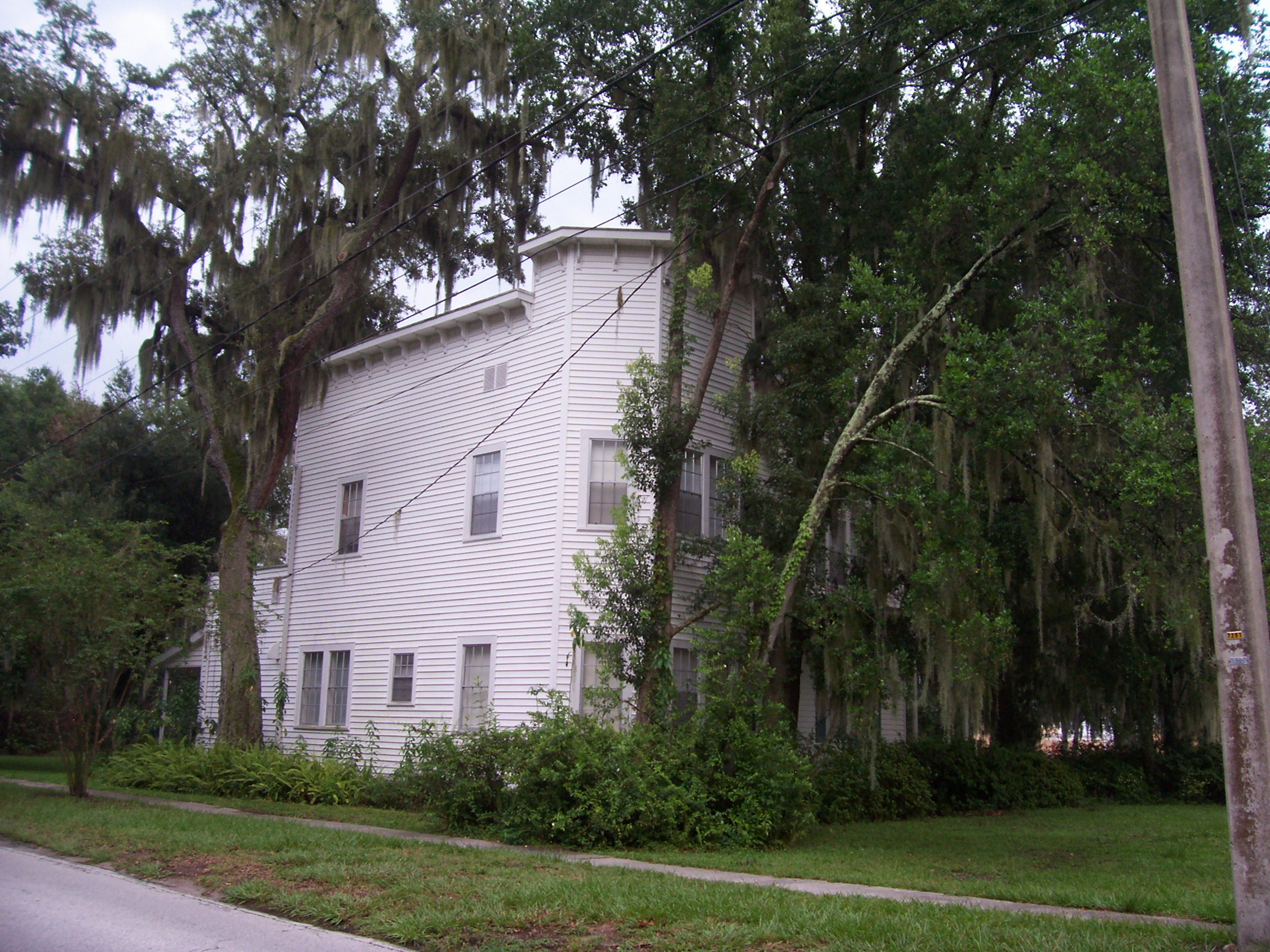
South Florida Military College

=== Historic buildings and landmarks ===
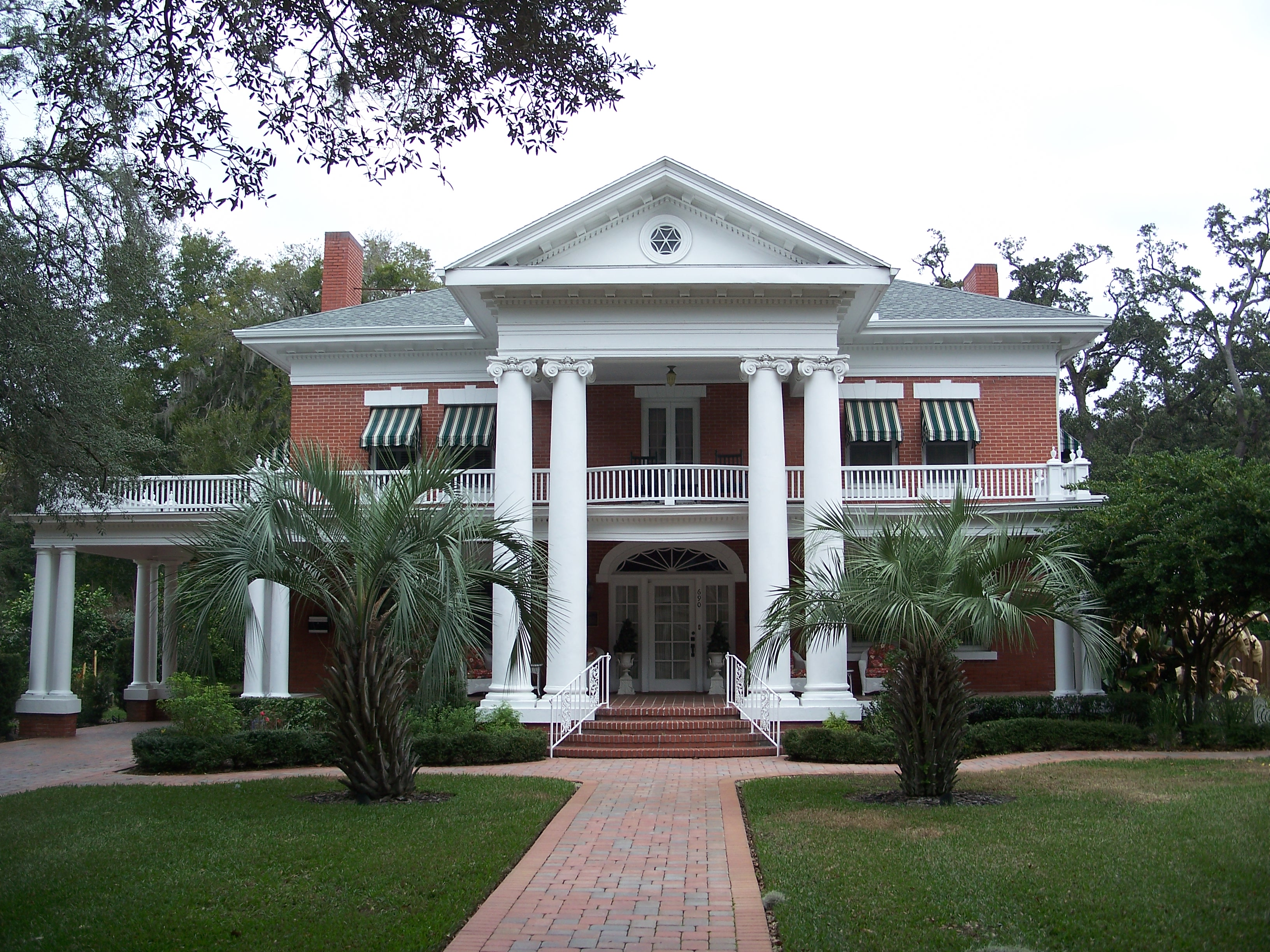
The Swearingen House

The city's Historic Architecture Review Board is responsible for the preservation, enhancement and promotion of historic buildings, landmarks and districts within the city. Three districts in the city, the Bartow Downtown Commercial District, the Northeast Bartow Residential District, and the South Bartow Residential District have been designated as historic districts. New construction within these districts is regulated by the board and they have the power to veto construction which might alter the character of the neighborhood.

While the towering oaks and ever-present azalea bushes which spawned the city's nickname give many of the historic landmarks of the city a distinctive Southern "look and feel", many styles of architecture are represented in Bartow's historic buildings. The South Bartow and Northeast Bartow historic districts are characterized by masonry vernacular and various revival styles, while downtown is dominated by frame vernacular and classical revival styles. Other buildings on the National Register of Historic Places with distinctive architectural styles include the Thompson and Company Cigar Factory built in a Mission Revival Style and the L.B. Brown House built with distinctive Victorian ornamentation. The L.B. Brown House is notable as perhaps the only house still standing in Florida built by a freedman. The Old Polk County Courthouse, Bartow's most recognizable symbol seen on its city seal, was built in 1909 in a neoclassical style. The Polk County Historical Museum is located in the Old Polk County Courthouse and consists of exhibits presenting local and regional history from pre-Columbian to present eras, along with a history and genealogical library.

Florida Senator Spessard L. Holland was born in Bartow. His home is located on South Broadway 2 blocks north of Bartow High School. Senator Holland was a founding member of the Holland and Knight Law Firm. The firm's original office was located on South Central Avenue across the street from the Bartow Post Office.

There are several other notable buildings in Bartow which are not on the National Register of Historic Places. The Wonder House at 1075 Mann Road features natural air-conditioning (using rainwater), secluded outdoor bathtubs, and numerous mirrors that let occupants see who is at the door from other parts of the home. The current owners of the Wonder House are restoring it and plan to open a museum. The Thomas Lee Wilson House, also known as the Stanford Inn, at 555 East Stanford Street was the "Sultenfuss Funeral Parlor" in the movie My Girl. The house at 935 South Oak Avenue known as "Windsweep" was the residence used in the movie China Moon.

== Sports and recreation ==
Many of the recreational opportunities in the area are outdoor activities designed to take advantage of the warm subtropical climate. There are eighteen parks in the City of Bartow Department of Parks and Recreation. Mary Holland Park, named after the wife of former Florida governor Spessard Holland, is a 119-acre (0.48 km^{2}) park with three lakes, a playground, an overnight camping area, and a skateboard park. The Bartow Civic Center is a 31-acre (130,000 m^{2}) complex with meeting rooms, concert facilities and a public pool. Bartow Park is a 95-acre (380,000 m^{2}) complex with softball, baseball and soccer fields and a track for remote control cars. The Bartow Golf Course is a par 72, 6,300 yard course designed by renowned golf course architect Donald Ross, with a restaurant and an area for barbecuing.

The Tour de Tow is an annual cycling tour held in September. The Fort Fraser Trail is a 7.7 miles (12.4 km) path leading from Bartow to South Lakeland. The path follows a converted CSX railroad line and is popular with area cyclists, joggers, and in-line skaters. Plans have been made to build a replica of the historic Fort Fraser along the path, as well as adding historical markers. Five picnic areas and six rest shelters are available along the path.

Polk County has over 550 lakes. Most of these lakes were formerly strip mines. They are closed to the public; only 88 of the lakes are open to the public via boat ramp access. The area has a national reputation for largemouth bass fishing, and tournaments are held weekly almost year-round. Some of the lakes on the east side of Bartow offer anglers the opportunity to catch 50 largemouth bass a day.

== Government and politics ==
=== Municipal government ===
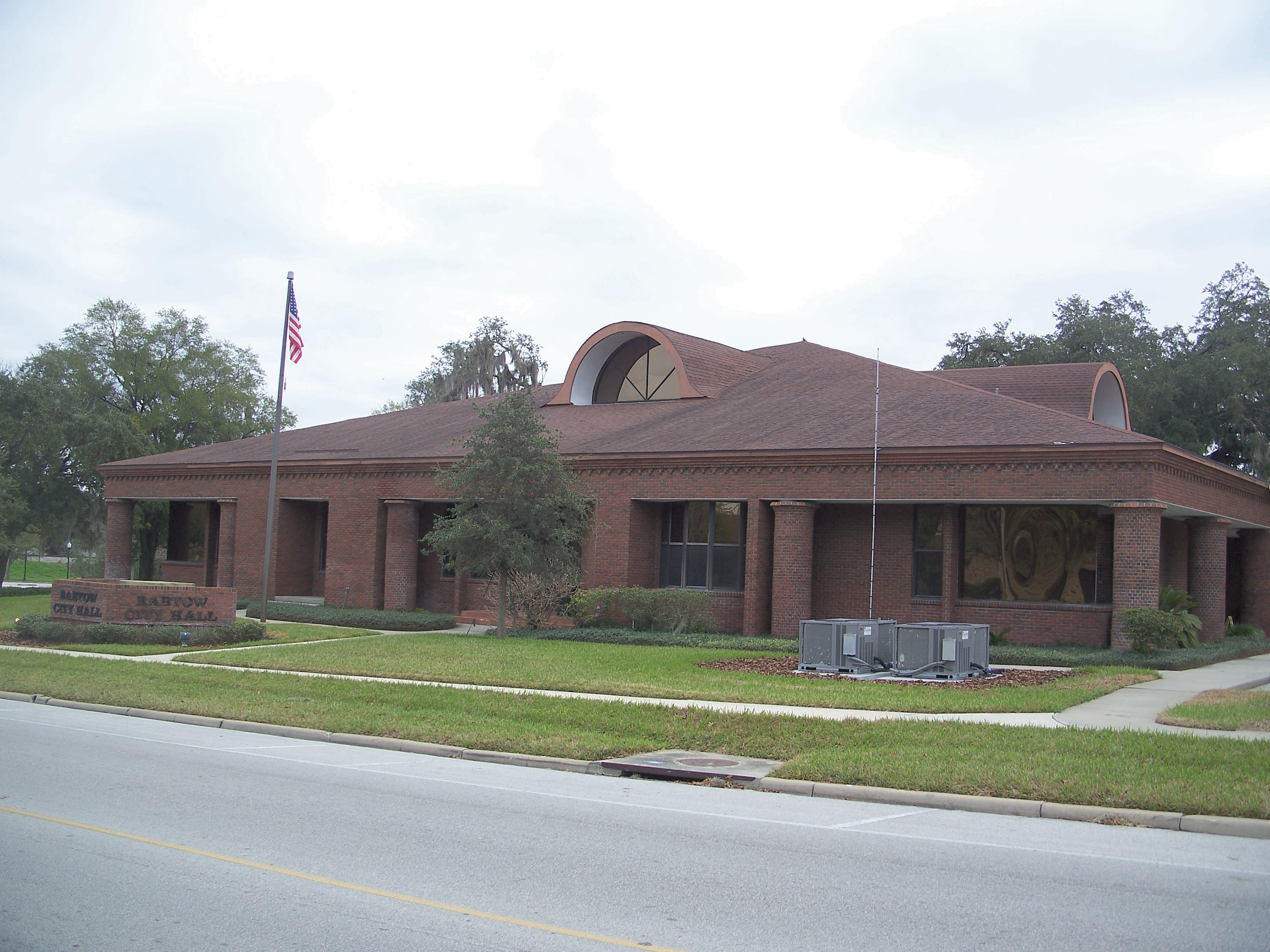
Bartow City Hall

The City of Bartow has a commission-manager form of government. The city commission consists of five commissioners, each elected for a three-year term. The mayor is a member of the city commission elected annually by the commissioners, although traditionally the position is rotated. As of 2022, the mayor of Bartow is Steve Githens Other commissioners are Nick Adams, Leo Longworth, Tanya Tucker and Trish Pfeiffer. The city executive powers rest with the city manager, as contracted by the city commission. In 2010, the city's budget was $74.2 million.

Electricity, waste disposal and water are municipal services provided by the city of Bartow to residents in city limits and nearby areas. Bartow is part of the Southwest Florida Water Management District and in times of drought, the city strictly enforces the restrictions set forth by the district.

Although it is a private entity outside of the city limits of Bartow, the Bartow Executive Airport is governed and administrated by the city commission, which convenes as the Bartow Airport Authority.

As of 2016, the Bartow Police Department had five sergeants, twenty officers, three K-9 officers, two school resource officers, two public safety aides, and one parking enforcement specialist. The Bartow Fire Department had 18 full-time firemen.

The city of Bartow also operates the Bartow Public library, which was founded in 1897 and has reciprocal borrowing agreements with other public libraries in Polk County.

=== Federal and state representation ===
Bartow, as well as the rest of Polk County, is part of the so-called I-4 corridor. The I-4 corridor is seen by political analysts as the most politically competitive part of the state. Polk is considered the most conservative county in the corridor. Even though the majority of the residents of Bartow are members of the Democratic Party, outnumbering the Republican Party in party affiliation (53.3% to 31.7%), voters tend to support Republicans in most state and federal elections. In 2008 Republican presidential candidate John McCain's lead over Democrat Barack Obama (53.6% to 46.5) in the city was larger than that of both the county and state.

All of Bartow's local representation in the state and federal legislatures are members of the Republican Party. Bartow is represented in the state Florida House of Representatives by Ben Albritton. In the Florida Senate, Bartow is represented by Denise Grimsley. In the United States House of Representatives, Bartow is located in Florida's 15th congressional district, and represented by Congressman Scott Franklin.

The Florida Department of Citrus has its headquarters in the Bob Crawford Agricultural Center in Bartow.

== Education ==
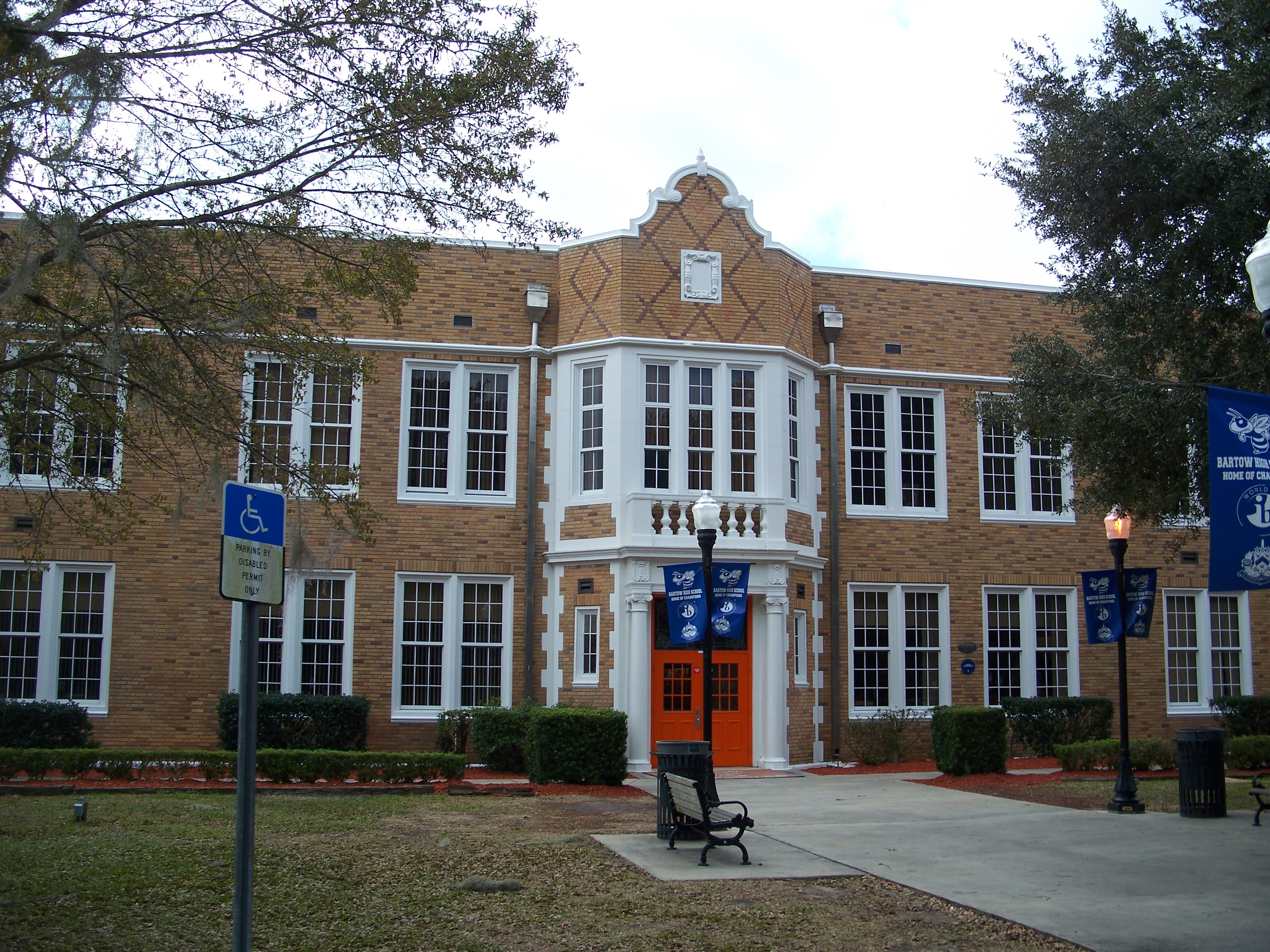
The Summerlin Building at Bartow High School

The schools in Bartow are operated by the Polk County School Board, although several predate the establishment of the school board, and they were autonomous at one time. Bartow High School, formerly Summerlin Institute, is the oldest high school in the county and one of the oldest high schools in the state of Florida.

In 1923, Union Academy became the first African-American high school in Polk County. Court-ordered integration began in Bartow during the fall of 1969, and the former black high school Union Academy became a middle school.

In 1971, Summerlin Institute officially became Bartow High School, which it had been informally called since at least the early 1900s.

There are currently seven elementary schools and two middle schools, which are feeder schools of Bartow High School.

Located on the campus of Bartow High School is the International Baccalaureate School of Polk County, which offers an academically challenging environment, and the Summerlin Academy, which offers a military-oriented education.

It is expected that the rapid growth of the Clear Springs development will necessitate the building of at least two elementary schools and a middle school within the next twenty years. As part of this development, a new Polk State College campus called The PSC Advanced Technology Center at Clear Springs was projected to open by 2012. This 20 acres (81,000 m^{2}) campus was planned to be located near the intersection of State Road 60 and 80 Foot Road.

While there are currently no colleges or universities in Bartow, there are several within a 20 mi (32 km) radius. The nearest university, University of South Florida Polytechnic, is located 6 mi (9.7 km) northwest of city limits in Lakeland, on a joint campus with Polk State College. Florida Southern College and Southeastern University are also located in Lakeland. Warner University is located to the east in Lake Wales.

== Media ==
Bartow is part of the Tampa/St. Pete television market, the 13th largest in the country. There are two AM radio stations within the city: WQXM (1460 AM) and WWBF (1130 AM). They are part of the local Lakeland/Winter Haven radio market, which is the 94th largest in the country. In addition to the stations in the local market, people in the area have the choice of both Tampa Bay and Orlando area radio stations. As of the 2010 market sweeps, several of the most listened to stations in the market are in the Tampa Bay area.

The Polk County Democrat is the only newspaper published within Bartow. It is a semi-weekly paper which began publication in 1931. The dominant daily newspaper is The Ledger out of Lakeland, although the Tampa Tribune, the News Chief out of Winter Haven, Florida, and the Orlando Sentinel have some circulation in town.

== Transportation ==
The street grid of Bartow is a typical four quadrant grid with Main Street as the east–west axis and Broadway Avenue as the north–south axis. Broadway is co-signed with U.S. Route 98 in the northern commercial district, and leads southward into the center of town before heading into one of the older residential sections of town. Main Street is the old State Road 60 leading into the historic heart of downtown Bartow.

The primary numbered routes going through Bartow are State Road 60 and U.S. Route 17 and U.S. Route 98. State Road 60 is a major state highway leading to both the Gulf and Atlantic coasts and is the major east–west route through town. Originally traveling along Main Street, State Road 60 now follows Van Fleet Drive bypassing the downtown area, and is commonly known as "the 60 Bypass" by locals. Heading east on State Road 60 leads to Lake Wales and on to Vero Beach, while westbound leads to Mulberry and eventually Tampa. U.S. 17 is the main north–south route on the east side of town. It is a four lane divided highway leading north to Winter Haven and south to Fort Meade. U.S. 98 is cosigned with U.S. 17 until its intersection with SR 60. Briefly cosigned with State Road 60 until its intersection with Broadway Avenue. US 98 then turns northward onto Broadway Avenue heading towards Lakeland. State Road 570, known as the Polk Parkway, is a toll road located (10 km) north of city limits on U.S. 98. The Polk Parkway provides direct freeway access to Tampa and Orlando via Interstate 4.

The explosive growth expected in the area in the next few decades has created a need for a reexamination of the area's transportation infrastructure. The Central Polk Parkway is a proposed limited access highway that would connect the Polk Parkway with U.S. 17 and State Road 60. The Northern Bartow Connector, which was expected to be completed by 2015 but was shelved as of 2016, is a partial loop around the north part of town connecting U.S. 98 with State Road 60 east of town. However, the portion connecting U.S. 98 and U.S. 17 was completed in 2013.

Bartow Executive Airport has a VFR control tower, three 5,000 ft runways (including two parallel runways), a restaurant with views of the airfield, an industrial park, and warehouse storage. Tampa International Airport (TPA) and Orlando International Airport (MCO) are within 60 miles (97 km) driving distance from the center of Bartow.

Bartow has its own bus system, the Bartow Shuttle, which runs from 6 a.m. to 6 p.m. Monday through Friday. The Citrus Connection has buses that serve the Bartow downtown area from Lakeland, and Winter Haven Area Transit serves Bartow from Winter Haven and Fort Meade.

== Library ==
The Bartow Public Library is a member of the Polk County Library Cooperative. It is located at 2150 S. Broadway Ave. Bartow, FL 33830. The library was started on May 19, 1897, above Polk County National Bank. After obtaining a Carnegie Grant, the public library was opened on February 8, 1915. It moved to its current location in 1998.

The Polk County Historical and Genealogical Library is housed within the Polk County Historical Museum in the historic Old Polk County Courthouse, and contains more than 40,000 items in its collection pertaining to history and genealogy of the eastern United States.

== Notable people ==
As it is the county seat, many government officials and politicians have been associated with Bartow since its founding. Perhaps the most notable is Spessard Holland, former Florida governor and U.S. senator, who governed the state during World War II and introduced the Twenty-fourth Amendment to the United States Constitution, which prohibited use of the poll tax in federal elections. Holland had opposed previous civil rights legislation. Spessard L. Holland Elementary, named in his honor, opened in 2009. His predecessor in the U.S. Senate, Charles O. Andrews, also attended school in Bartow. Others who were raised and schooled in Bartow include former Florida Supreme Court Chief Justice Stephen Grimes, former Florida Secretary of State Katherine Harris, who had a key role during the 2000 U.S. presidential election, and former U.S. congressman Adam Putnam.

The most notable military officer from Bartow is four-star general James Van Fleet, who was the commanding officer of the United Nations forces during the Korean War. Other generals associated with the City of Bartow include Albert H. Blanding, who served during World War One, and Confederate General Evander M. Law, who lived for his last forty years in Bartow.

Numerous men who became professional athletes were born, lived in or associated with the city of Bartow. Some were born in Polk General Hospital, a public hospital in Bartow which closed in 1995, but most were generally associated with other cities in Polk County. Born in Bartow and raised elsewhere in the county were NFL linebacker Ray Lewis, NBA guard Tracy McGrady, and motocross star James "Bubba" Stewart. Other athletes who were raised and educated in Bartow include former NFL defensive back (2023 Hall of Fame class) Ken Riley, former NFL defensive back Marcus Floyd, former Cleveland Indians outfielder Frank Baker, and former NASCAR driver Rick Wilson.

Other notable people from Bartow include Lake Eola Park founder Jacob Summerlin, January 2010 Playboy Playmate Jaime Faith Edmondson, centenarian Charlie Smith, lynching victim Fred Rochelle, and Ossian Sweet, a physician who challenged the color line in Detroit and was acquitted of murder charges.
